= Tolay Creek =

Location
- Country: United States
- State: California
- Region: Sonoma County

Physical characteristics
- Source: Sonoma Mountains
  - location: 2 mi (3 km) north of Lakeville, California
  - coordinates: 38°13′52″N 122°31′51″W
  - elevation: 225 ft (69 m)
- Mouth: San Pablo Bay
  - location: 7 mi (11 km) east of Novato, California
  - coordinates: 38°7′16″N 122°27′7″W
  - elevation: 7 ft (2.1 m)

Tolay Creek is a 12.5-mile-long (20.1 km) southward-flowing stream in southern Sonoma County, California, United States, which flows through Tolay Lake and ends in north San Pablo Bay.

== History ==
The Alaguali were a Coast Miwok community of northern San Pablo Bay in the Tolay Creek region. Alaguali lands bordered the north edge of San Pablo Bay and the southern one third of their area was low tidal marshland at the mouth of Sonoma Creek and Napa Slough. Their strong marriage ties to the Petalumas suggest that the Alagualis held all of the valley of Tolay Creek to the north of Sears Point up to the Sonoma Valley airport, consisting of about 56 square miles. In 1814 the Spanish authorities began to split up the Alaguali amongst different missions, baptizing 91 at Mission Dolores and 37 at Mission San José.

Padre José Altimira, the founder of Mission San Francisco Solano, wrote in his diary on June 27, 1823, "Tolay Lake so called for the Chief of the Indians". Tolay Creek was named for the lake.

== Watershed ==
The Tolay Creek watershed lies between Sonoma Creek and the Petaluma River. It originates near Stage Gulch Road (part of State Route 116) about 2 mi (3 km) north of Lakeville, California. It feeds Tolay Lake, then descends to flow under State Route 121 north of the Infineon Raceway. It parallels State Route 121 southward to State Route 37 at Sears Point, California, feeds into the Napa Sonoma Marsh, and enters San Pablo Bay west of Tubbs Island in the San Pablo Bay National Wildlife Refuge.

South of State Route 37, Tolay Creek marks part of the western boundary of the Sonoma Valley AVA, a federally designated wine appellation.

== See also ==
- List of watercourses in the San Francisco Bay Area
- Miwok
