= Napa Sonoma Marsh =

Wetland in San Francisco Bay, California, USA

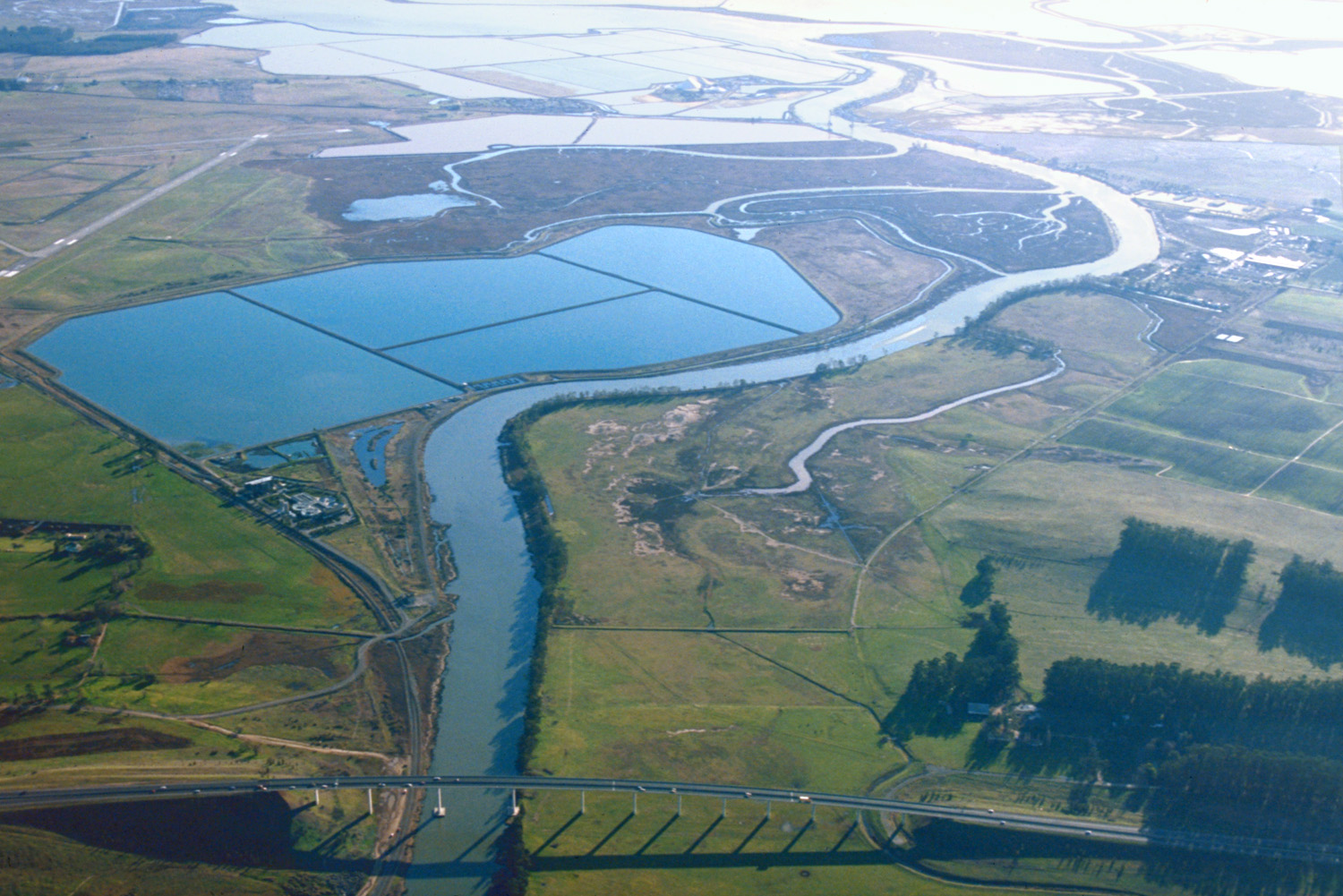
- Aerial view of the southern end of the Napa River in the Napa Sonoma Marsh

- Location in California
- Location: San Francisco Bay Area, California, USA
- Coordinates: 38.16871°N 122.33946°W
- Type: Marsh
- Part of: San Pablo Bay, San Francisco Bay
- Primary inflows: Sonoma Creek; Napa River
- Surface area: 48,000 acres (190 km^{2})
- Sections/sub-basins: San Pablo Bay National Wildlife Refuge
- Website: Official website

The Napa Sonoma Marsh is a wetland at the northern edge of San Pablo Bay, which is a northern arm of the San Francisco Bay in California, United States. This marsh has an area of 48,000 acres (190 km^{2}), of which 13,000 acres (53 km^{2}) are abandoned salt evaporation ponds. The United States Government has designated 13,000 acres (53 km^{2}) in the Napa Sonoma Marsh as the San Pablo Bay National Wildlife Refuge.

== Overview ==
The marsh is fed by Sonoma Creek (which drains the Sonoma Valley), Tolay Creek (originating in the Tolay Lake basin), and the Napa River (which drains the Napa Valley). Although the marsh extends north as far as State Route 12, as a practical matter, most of the marsh is only accessible by boat.

The marsh is a productive estuarine ecosystem providing habitat for a wide diversity of flora and fauna, including numerous rare and endangered species such as the California clapper rail and California freshwater shrimp. Because of its rich avafaunal content, the Napa Sonoma Marsh is one of only seven marshes selected for intensive study by the Point Reyes Bird Observatory (based on a total of 50 discrete marshes appurtenant to the San Francisco Bay).

Around 1860, the Napa Sonoma Marsh was one of the most productive wetlands of the Pacific Coast, providing habitat for millions of birds. By the mid-1980s, the San Francisco Bay perimeter had lost over 91 percent of its wetlands. The Napa Sonoma Marsh represents one of the few sizeable expanses where restoration is feasible.

During the Vietnam War, the Navy utilized the marsh as a training ground for crews of the Navy's new Swift boats and patrol boats, operating out of Mare Island Naval Shipyard at the marsh's southern terminus.

An extensive research literature base exists for the Napa Sonoma Marsh.

== See also ==
- Hydrography of the San Francisco Bay Area
- Salt marsh harvest mouse
- Sears Point
- Suisun shrew
