= California State Route 37 =

Highway in California

State Route 37
- SR 37 highlighted in red

Route information
- Maintained by Caltrans
- Length: 21.494 mi (34.591 km)
- Existed: 1917; 1934–present

Major junctions
- West end: US 101 in Novato
- SR 121 at Sears Point; SR 29 in Vallejo
- East end: I-80 in Vallejo

Location
- Country: United States
- State: California
- Counties: Marin, Sonoma, Solano

Highway system
- State highways in California; Interstate; US; State; Scenic; History; Pre‑1964; Unconstructed; Deleted; Freeways
← SR 36	→ SR 38

State Route 37 (SR 37) is a state highway in the U.S. state of California that runs 21 miles (34 km) along the northern shore of San Pablo Bay. It serves as a vital connection in the North Bay region of the San Francisco Bay Area, running from U.S. Route 101 in Novato, through northeastern Marin County, and the southern tips of both Sonoma and Solano Counties to Interstate 80 in Vallejo. Sonoma Raceway and Six Flags Discovery Kingdom are accessible from Highway 37.

The section of Highway 37 between Sears Point and Vallejo was the Sears Point Toll Road, a toll road managed by Golden Gate Ferry, before it was purchased by the State in 1938. The highway has been proposed to be built to freeway standards since the early 1950s. However, the proposal was met with many economic and environmental obstacles, making the task all but impossible for much of the route. The route is plagued by flooding which can be exacerbated by levee breaks near Vallejo. Most of the highway crosses a marsh that is home to endangered salt marsh harvest mice. A section of highway was once known as "Blood Alley" for its high rate of fatal accidents. A concrete barrier built in the 1990s eliminated those fatal head-on collisions. By 2022, there have been proposals to reinstate tolls between Sears Point and Vallejo to help pay for flooding and other improvements.

== Route description ==
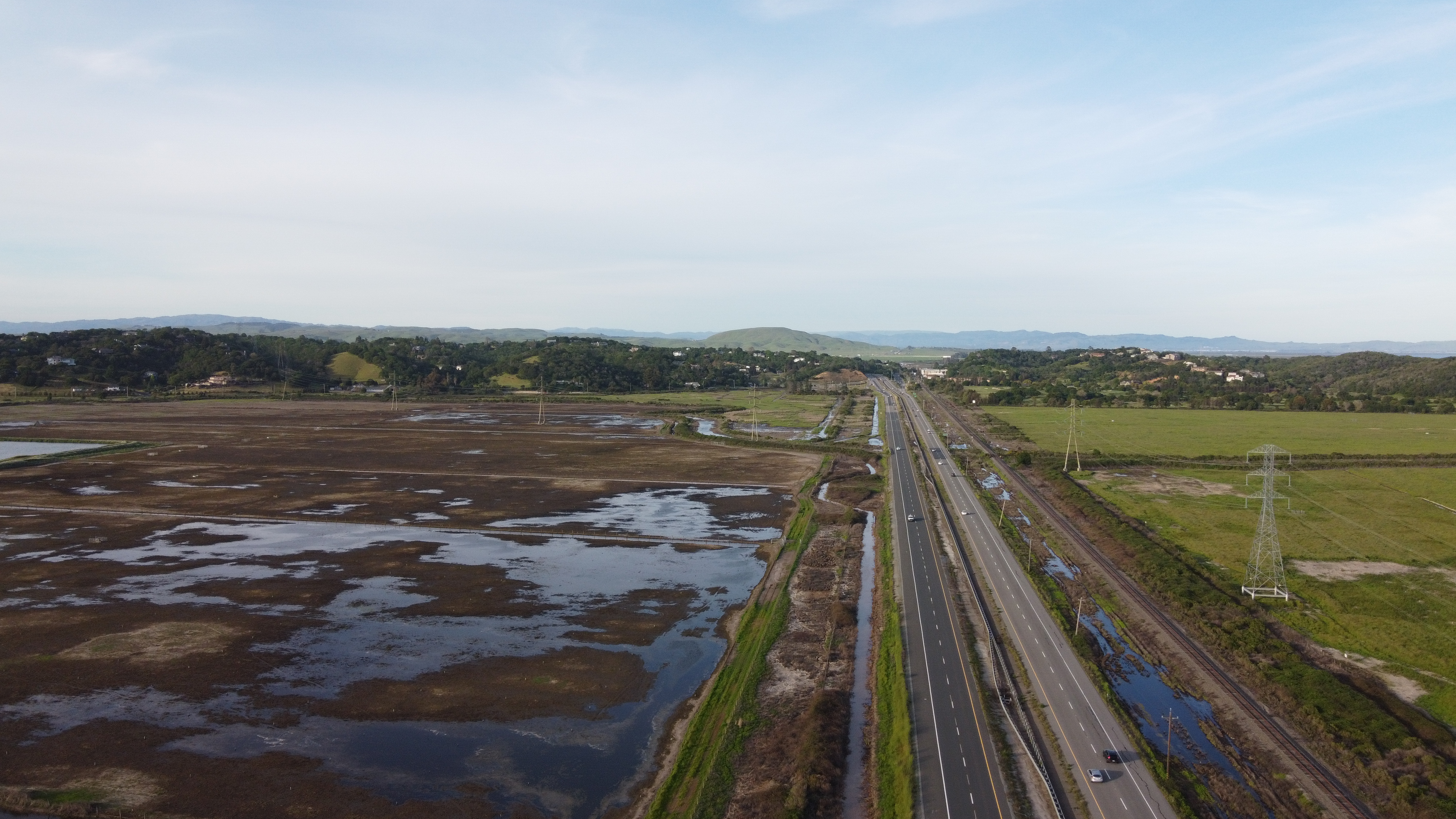
SR 37 in Novato

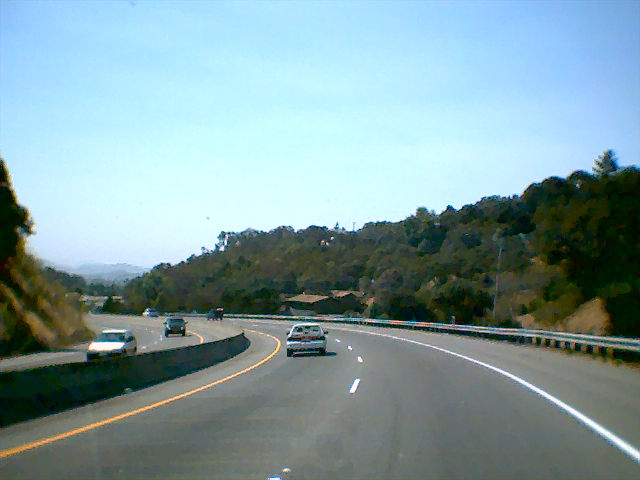
SR 37 near Sears Point

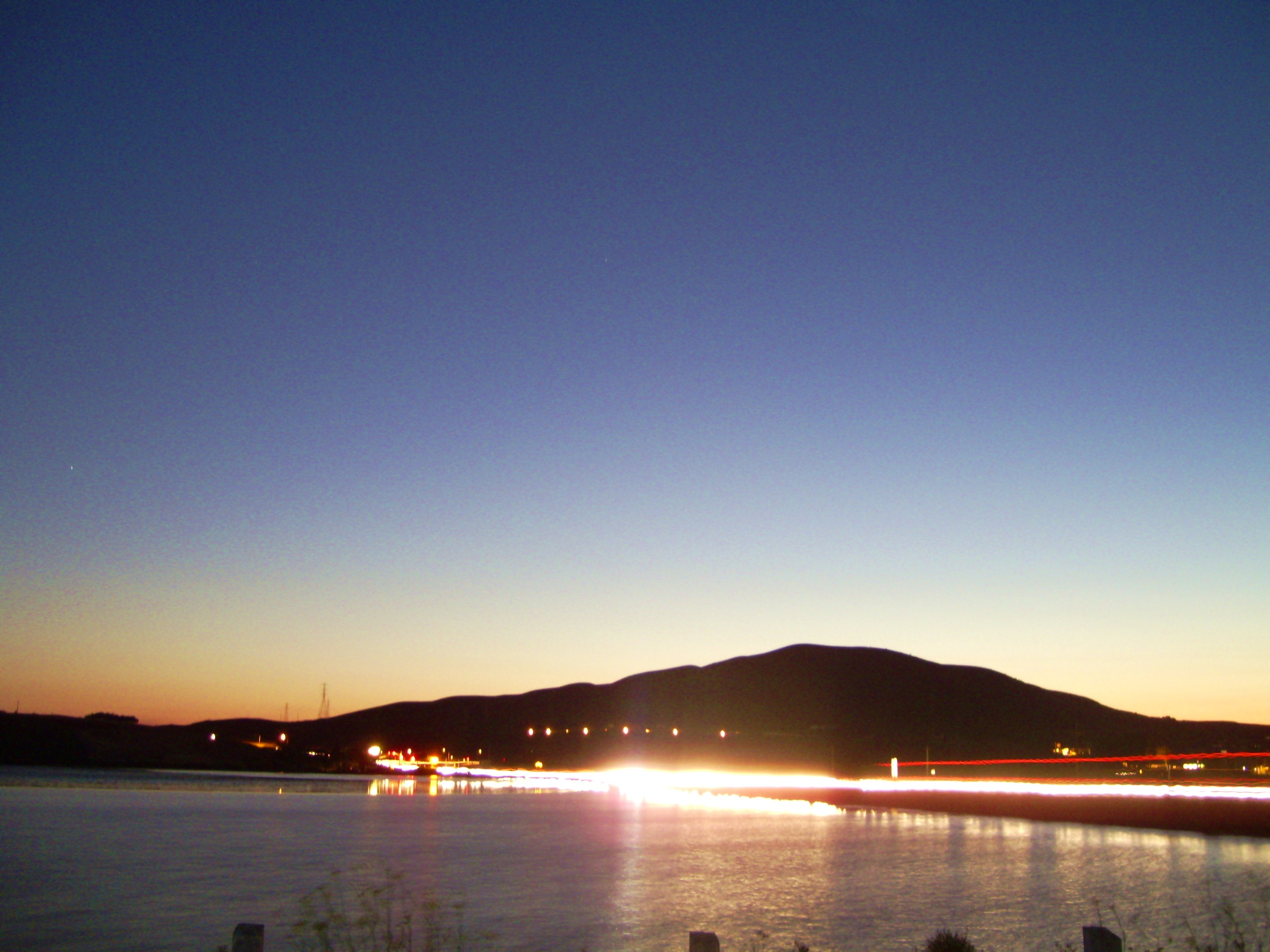
SR 37 at sunset; Raceway Hill in background

Route 37 is defined as follows in section 337 of the California Streets and Highways Code:

Route 37 is from:
(a) Route 251 near Nicasio to Route 101 near Novato.
(b) Route 101 near Novato to Route 80 near Lake Chabot via the vicinity of Sears Point and via the former Sears Point Toll Road.

Route 37 was never fully constructed to extend west to near Nicasio as it is defined, as well as the entirety of State Route 251.

SR 37 begins in Novato with a junction at U.S. Route 101 and heads northeast as a freeway for about a quarter mile before becoming a four-lane expressway. The route passes over the Petaluma River into Sonoma County before meeting the southern terminus of State Route 121 at a signal-controlled intersection near Sears Point and the Sonoma Raceway.

The route continues as a divided two-lane expressway in a more easterly, then southeasterly, direction as it crosses Tolay Creek and proceeds through the Napa Sonoma Marsh at the northern edge of San Pablo Bay. Before the construction of the barrier in 1995, this portion of SR 37 was three lanes with the middle lane alternately serving as a passing lane for each direction. This stretch of highway was given the nickname of "Blood Alley" for its high-rate of fatal accidents. With the middle lane removed, accidents dropped dramatically.

SR 37 becomes a four-lane freeway on Mare Island, approaching northern Vallejo. After it crosses over the Napa River Bridge, it continues as a freeway, overlapping the old highway alignment and passing north of the old road known as Marine World Parkway (due to its proximity to the Six Flags Discovery Kingdom, previously known as Marine World). SR 37 travels in a northeasterly direction along the White Slough before turning east as it crosses over State Route 29 and heads to its eastern terminus at I-80 as the James Capoot Memorial Highway (honoring a Vallejo police officer who was killed in the line of duty). In the early 1990s, the stretch between Fairgrounds Drive, which serves as the entrance to Discovery Kingdom, and Mini Drive was upgraded to a freeway. In 2004 and 2005, following over fifty years of complications, the remaining non-freeway section in Vallejo was upgraded as well.

SR 37 is also known as Randy Bolt Memorial Highway from SR 29 to Skaggs Road (honoring a California Department of Justice agent who was killed in the line of duty in an accident along SR 37), and Sears Point Toll Road, which was originally a toll road that ran from SR 121 to Vallejo. SR 37 is part of the California Freeway and Expressway System, but is not part of the National Highway System, a network of highways that are considered essential to the country's economy, defense, and mobility by the Federal Highway Administration. SR 37 is eligible for the State Scenic Highway System, but it is not officially designated as a scenic highway by the California Department of Transportation.

== History ==
The stretch of road east of Sears Point was once part of the historical El Camino Real. As a result of the State Highways Acts of the early 20th century, the Black Point Cut-off was built over it and opened to traffic in 1917. This highway followed the current alignment east of Sears Point, before diverting northeast along present-day Route 121. It was first designated Legislative Route 8 (LRN 8), later being signed as State Route 37.

Prior to being under State control, the section between Sears Point and Vallejo was known as the Sears Point Toll Road, a toll road managed by Golden Gate Ferry that was built over an ancient Native American trail. When it was purchased by the State in 1938, tolls were removed; it then became signed as State Route 48 until 1964.

Route 37 was redefined in the 1964 state highway renumbering as a route starting at SR 251, then SR 17, near Nicasio and ending at I-80 near Lake Chabot. The whole of SR 37 has been proposed to be built to freeway standards since the early 1950s. However, the proposal was met with many economic and environmental obstacles, making the task all but impossible for much of the route.

=== Sears Point Toll Road ===
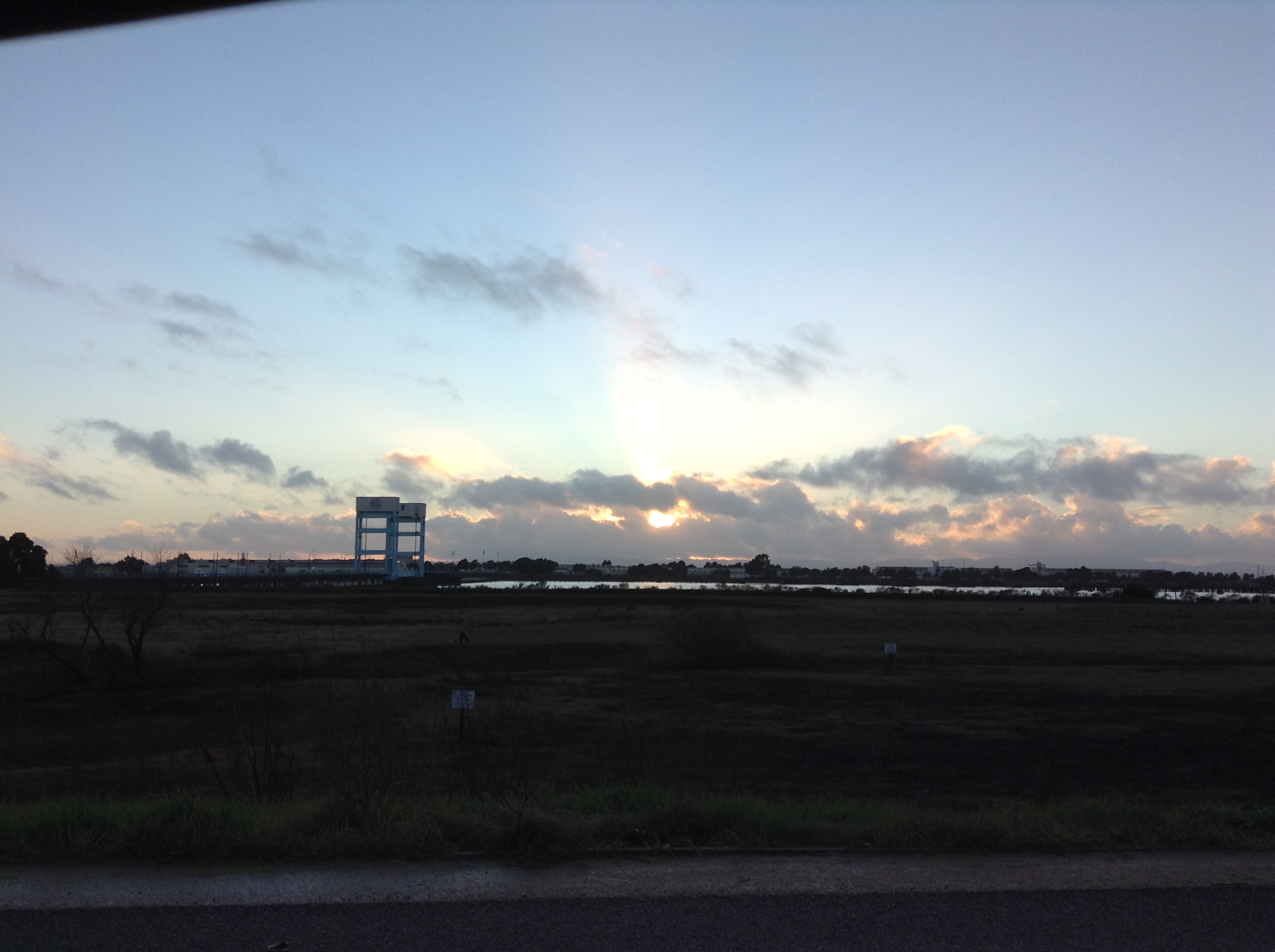
A view of the Mare Island bridge from SR 37

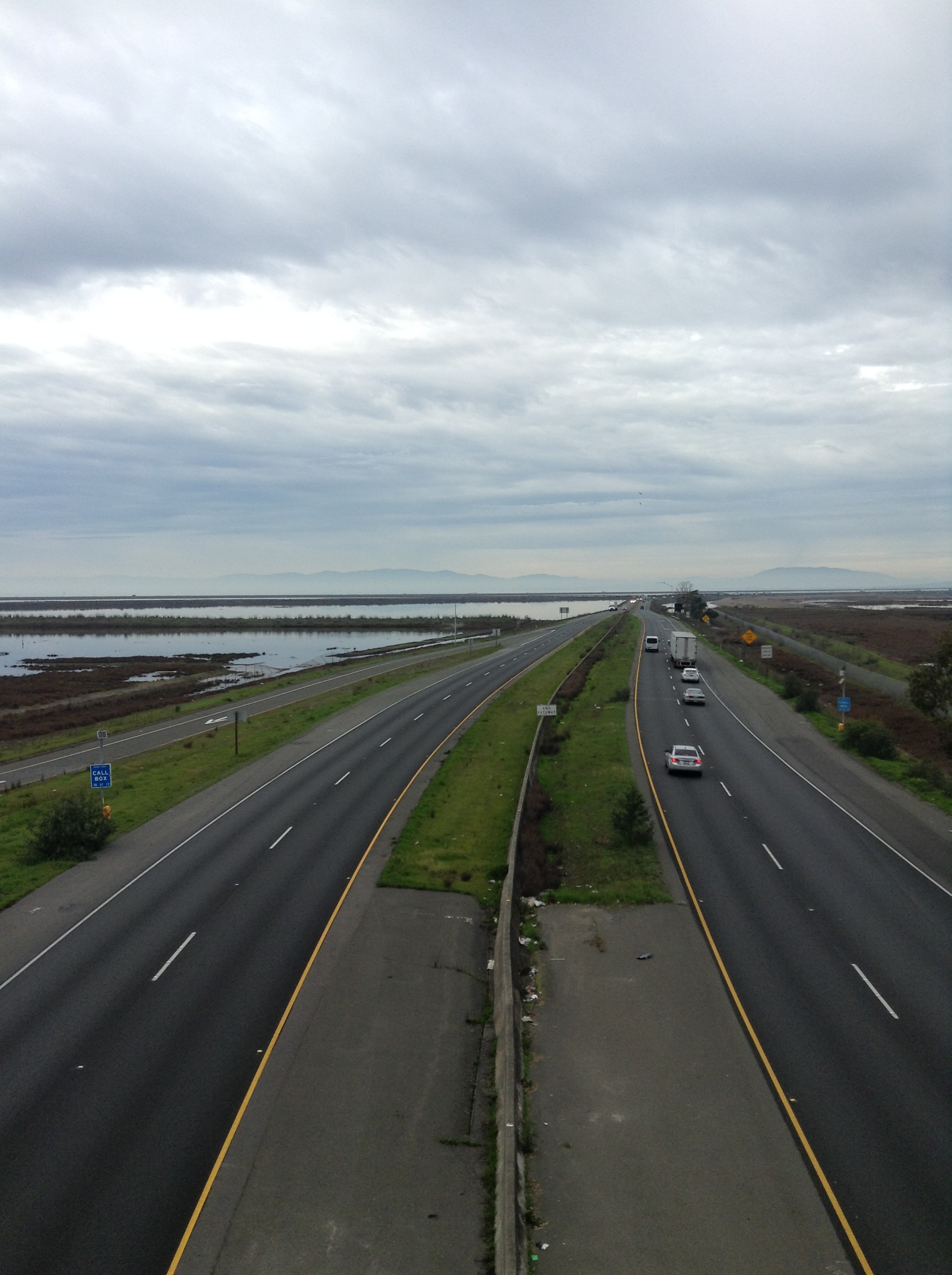
SR 37 outside of Mare Island

As late as 1926, Golden Gate Ferries, owners of the Sears Point Toll Road Co., began plans to build the Sears Point Toll Road, with a contract awarded to Oakland-based Hutchinson Company in October 1927. The paved toll road was to be built on top of an ancient Native American trail along the San Pablo Bay shore between the Sacramento Highway and the Black Point cut-off (LRN 8) near Sears Point. It was expected to cost $775,000USD, with a toll not exceeding $0.35. Toll road officials explained the purpose of the road: to stimulate motor vehicle usage by reducing the commute times and expenses of motorists traveling from the East Bay and Sacramento areas by offering a more direct route toward Marin, Sonoma and the Redwood Highway. The road opened for traffic in 1928.

On November 29, 1932, the California State Highway Commission received a recommendation to purchase the road and was able to invest $418,000USD by 1936. However, the U.S. Navy owned rights to the right-of-way of part of the route, and opposed the purchase. This resulted in congressional actions to establish a clear title deed for the route. House Representative Richard J. Welch was one of the earliest government officials to pressure the State of California to acquire the toll road in order to convert it into a toll-free highway. He argued that having only one toll road to travel in order to reach the Golden Gate Bridge would benefit commuters; he also cited the ten and seventh-tenths-mile difference in distance between the toll road and a route through Napa. A Navy Department deed permitting the State to purchase the road was granted by the Attorney General on October 26, 1938. The highway then became signed as State Route 48 until the 1964 renumbering.

=== Highway upgrading in Vallejo ===
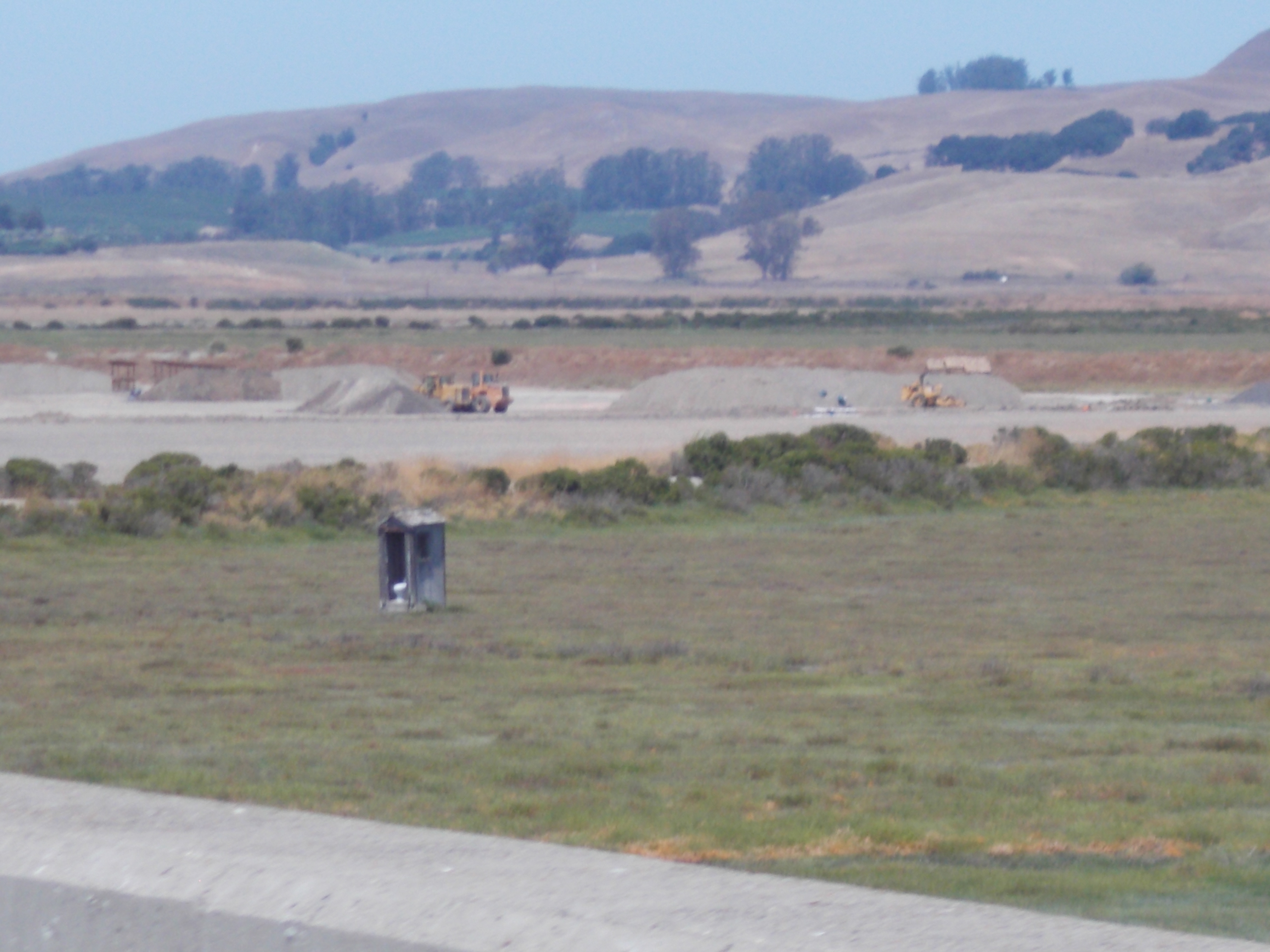
The Lone Toilet on Highway 37 near Sears Point Rd 01

By 1955, talks began about upgrading the highway. After a proposition to turn much of the route into a toll road failed, it was decided a four-lane freeway would be the best decision. However, opposition from residents in surrounding neighborhoods as well as a federal oil embargo only allowed widening of the approach between Fairgrounds Drive and I-80. In 1977, a levee broke and flooded a portion of the developed land, turning it into protected wetlands that is home to endangered species. Because of its new status, environmental studies were needed in order to continue the project.

Soon after, the project was split into different phases to handle problems with particular areas. It was first divided between the newly created marshlands and the section between SR 29 (Sonoma Boulevard) and I-80. With Marine World being relocated, the city was able to widen the latter section and build an overpass across Fairgrounds Drive in 1992.

=== "Blood Alley" ===
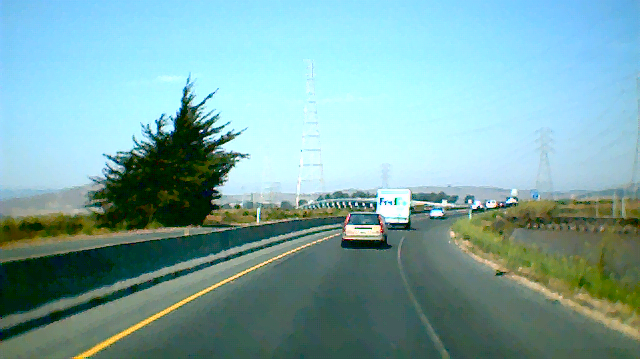
This section of SR 37 was once known as "Blood Alley" for its rate of fatal accidents

While the Vallejo section of SR 37 was being updated, another problem with the route would hinder its progress. The section between Sears Point and Mare Island was plagued with fatal accidents, earning its nickname of "Blood Alley". Between 1966 and 1970, 27 people lost their lives on it. In a preliminary effort to reduce the fatalities, officials established both a daylight test section, requiring all cars to keep their headlights on during the day, and passing lanes. However, these efforts were ineffective.

In 1993, local resident Jim Poulos campaigned to have a barrier erected after the death of his 18-year-old son, Frankie, on "Blood Alley". At this time, the situation with this stretch only worsened as the death toll between 1990 and 1996 rose to thirty-one. At first, Caltrans thought the barrier would make matters worse since it would be difficult for emergency vehicles to attend to accidents; environmental issues were also cited. Caltrans was waiting for the ability to create a causeway to span the area instead. Poulos continued his campaign despite opposition, and was granted the barrier in 1995. The barrier was not built without controversy, as it also eliminated the passing lanes. However, since the barriers were built, there were no longer any crossover accidents as of 2005.

While the median was built, a few problems needed to be resolved in order for the road to work both safely and in an environmentally friendly way. Emergency personnel needed to quickly access accidents and provide them easy transport to nearby hospitals. To alleviate this problem, Caltrans implemented electric gate technology, which would allow emergency vehicles to cut through certain parts of the median. The other problem was to both protect the plant life and the salt marsh harvest mice residing around the highway. As a result, crews placed timbers and sheeting to protect foliage, and added holes into the median barrier to allow the mice to cross the highway.

=== White Slough and Sonoma Boulevard interchange ===
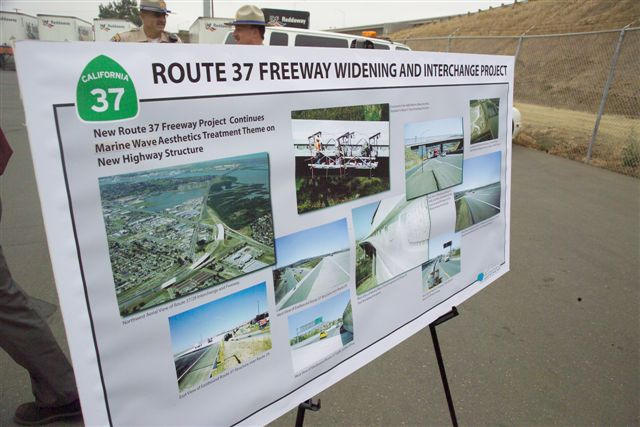
Display of the various components of the project including the SR 37/SR 29 interchange.

To protect White Slough while still allowing the widening of SR 37, the White Slough Protection and Development Act was passed in 1990. It allowed up to 13 acres of wetlands to be filled but required at least four times as much wetland restoration elsewhere in the Bay Area.

After environmental studies on the White Slough, Caltrans widened and elevated that section of the road and converted it to a freeway. To accommodate bicycles and pedestrians, a cycleway was built along the eastbound side of the freeway. Finally, Caltrans completed the overpass which crossed SR 29, Broadway, and Mini Drive (bypassing Marine World Parkway, three traffic signaled intersections, and a railroad grade crossing). The project was completed in the summer of 2005, and fully open to traffic on August 20.

=== 2019 flooding ===
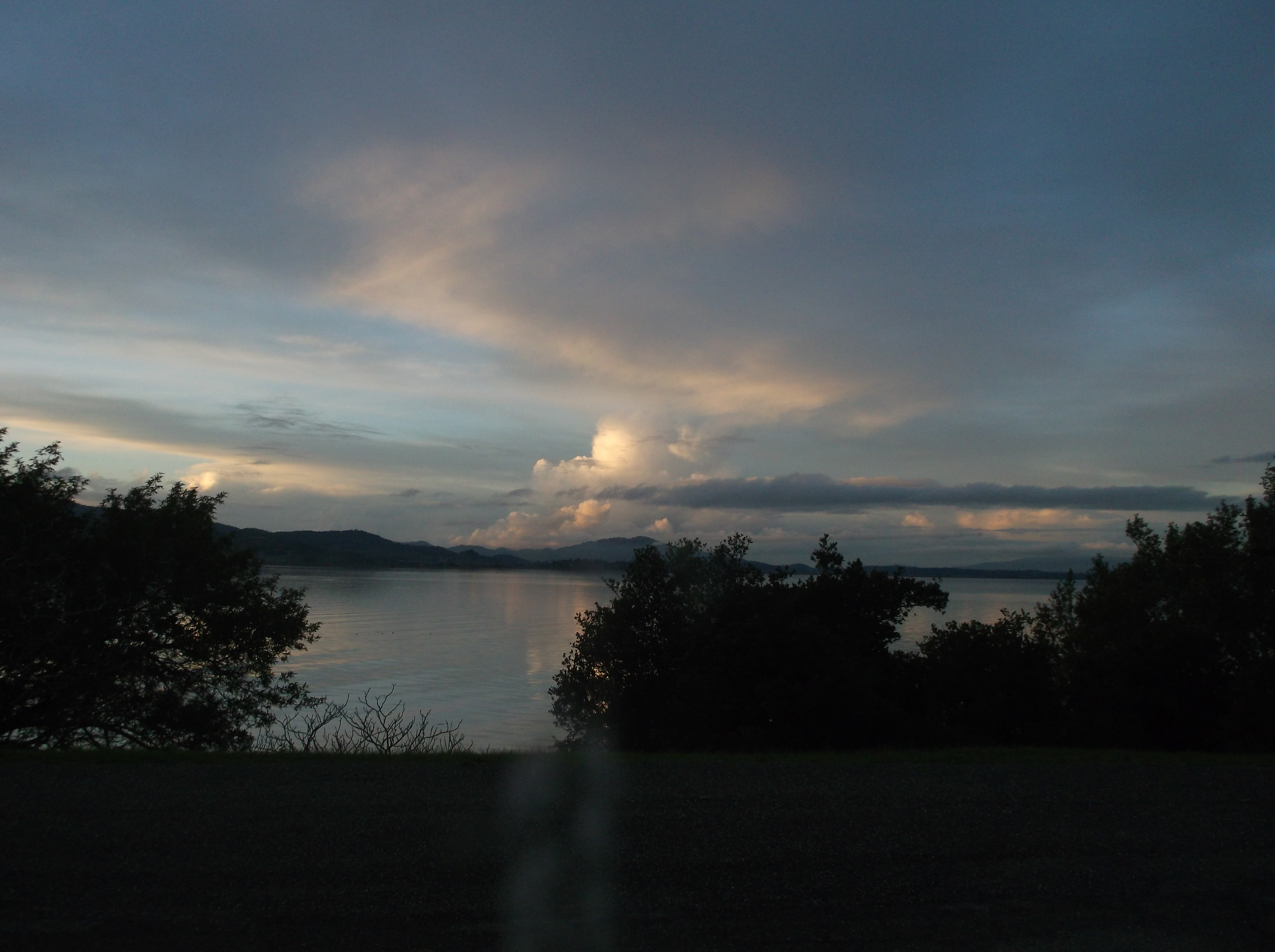
Looking at San Pablo Bay National Wildlife Refuge from SR 37

The highway is increasingly subject to flooding as the 21-mile (34 km) route is near sea level. The road was closed for a total of 28 days during the winter of 2016-17.

On the morning of Friday February 15, 2019, the westernmost portion of the westbound highway (between Atherton Ave. and U.S. Route 101) was closed due to flooding caused by a levee break. Marin County declared a state of emergency, and public works crews worked 24 hours a day pumping water and repairing the levee. It was expected to be closed for at least a week, however the highway fully reopened on the morning of Wednesday, February 20, 2019.

=== Future ===
In 2017, it was estimated that it would cost $4 billion to fix all the flooding, traffic, and other issues along the corridor, and based on transportation funding levels it would take until 2088 to come up with that amount of money.

In 2022, California State Senator Bill Dodd introduced new legislation that would make the route a toll road again between Sears Point and at least Mare Island. The proposed law would use the toll revenues to help pay for the flooding and traffic improvements. It has been opposed by a number of commuters, particular Solano county residents who commute west to jobs in Sonoma or Marin counties. In May 2023, the California Transportation Commission unanimously approved a plan to toll both directions, as well as widen the highway from a two-lane road to one with carpool lanes by converting the existing shoulders. The proposed toll in each direction would be half of the toll on the seven state-owned Bay Area bridges operated by the Bay Area Toll Authority. Toll collection would not begin until the new carpool lanes are completed, regular bus service along the highway's corridor is established, and a toll discount program for low income users is established.

== Major intersections ==
Except where prefixed with a letter, postmiles were measured on the road as it was in 1964, based on the alignment that existed at the time, and do not necessarily reflect current mileage. Postmile prefixes include: R reflecting a realignment in the route since then, M indicating a second realignment, L referring to an overlap due to a correction or change, and T indicating postmiles classified as temporary. Segments that remain unconstructed or have been relinquished to local control may be omitted. The numbers reset at county lines; the start and end postmiles in each county are given in the county column.

Exits on the westernmost portion of the route are unnumbered.

County	Location	Postmile	Exit	Destinations	Notes
Marin; MRN R11.20-14.62	Novato	R11.20		South Novato Boulevard	Continuation beyond US 101
Marin; MRN R11.20-14.62	Novato	R11.20	—	US 101 – Santa Rosa, Eureka, San Rafael, San Francisco	West end of SR 37; US 101 north exit 460A, south exit 460
Marin; MRN R11.20-14.62	Novato		—	Marsh Drive, Hanna Ranch Road	
Marin; MRN R11.20-14.62		13.77	—	Atherton Avenue – Black Point	East end of freeway; eastbound entrance is via Harbor Drive
Marin; MRN R11.20-14.62		14.47	—	Harbor Drive	Interchange; no eastbound exit
Marin–Sonoma county line		14.47 0.00	Petaluma River		
Sonoma; SON 0.00-R6.25	Sears Point	2.06		Lakeville Road	Connects to SR 116 / Petaluma
Sonoma; SON 0.00-R6.25	Sears Point	3.90		SR 121 (Arnold Drive) – Napa, Sonoma	Southern terminus of SR 121; serves Sonoma Raceway
Sonoma–Solano county line		R6.25 R0.00	Sonoma Creek		
Solano; SOL R0.00-R12.00				Skaggs Island (Skaggs Island Road)	Gate into Skaggs Island generally only open during scheduled tours
Solano; SOL R0.00-R12.00			West end of freeway		
Solano; SOL R0.00-R12.00	Vallejo	R7.21	17	Walnut Avenue – Mare Island	
Solano; SOL R0.00-R12.00	Vallejo	R7.39	Mare Island Bridge over Napa River		
Solano; SOL R0.00-R12.00	Vallejo	8.01	18	Wilson Avenue, Sacramento Street	
Solano; SOL R0.00-R12.00	Vallejo	9.52	19	SR 29 (Sonoma Boulevard) – Napa, Downtown Vallejo	
Solano; SOL R0.00-R12.00	Vallejo	10.96	20	Fairgrounds Drive – Discovery Kingdom	
Solano; SOL R0.00-R12.00	Vallejo	R12.00	21	I-80 – Sacramento, San Francisco	Eastbound exit and westbound entrance; signed as exits 21A (west) and 21C (east); I-80 east exit 33, west exit 33B
Solano; SOL R0.00-R12.00	Vallejo	R12.00	21B	Auto Mall – Columbus Parkway	Eastbound exit and westbound entrance; east end of SR 37
1.000 mi = 1.609 km; 1.000 km = 0.621 mi: Incomplete access

== Popular culture ==
Train's 2012 album California 37 is named after State Route 37, with the album cover prominently featuring the route's highway shield.

AFI released a song titled "Rabbits Are Roadkill on Rt. 37" on its 2006 album Decemberunderground.
