= California State Route 121 =

Highway in California

State Route 121

- Map of western California with SR 121 highlighted in red

Route information
- Maintained by Caltrans
- Length: 33.567 mi (54.021 km)

Major junctions
- South end: SR 37 at Sears Point
- SR 12 from Schellville to Napa; SR 29 in Napa
- North end: SR 128 near Lake Berryessa

Location
- Country: United States
- State: California
- Counties: Sonoma, Napa

Highway system
- State highways in California; Interstate; US; State; Scenic; History; Pre‑1964; Unconstructed; Deleted; Freeways
← SR 120	→ SR 122

State Route 121 (SR 121) is a state highway in the U.S. state of California. It runs through the Wine Country region of Sonoma and Napa counties. Its southern terminus is at State Route 37 at Sears Point, and its northern terminus is at State Route 128 near Lake Berryessa. SR 121 passes through the Carneros region of the southern Sonoma Valley and Napa Valley.

== Route description ==
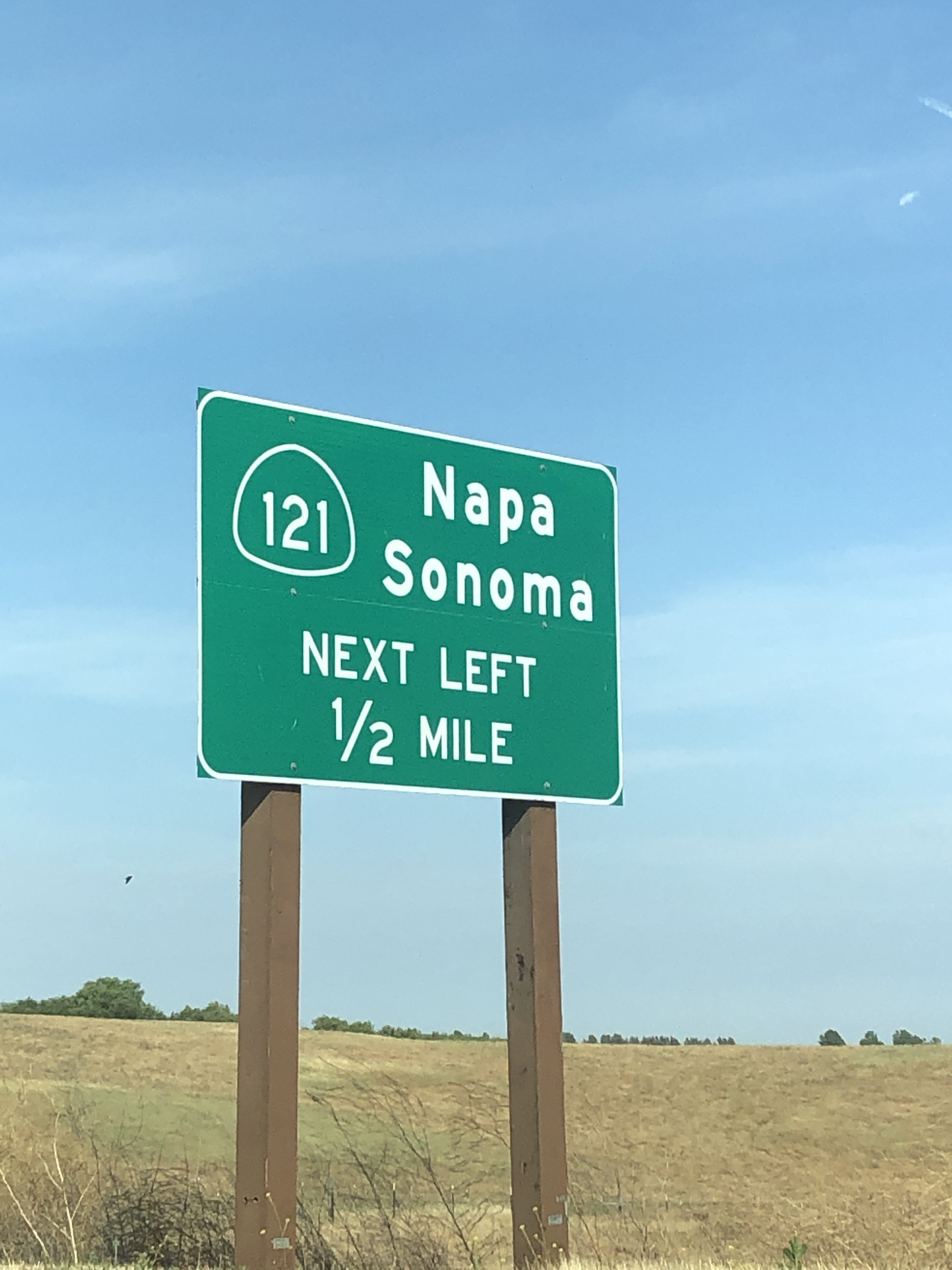
A sign on SR 37 directing drivers to SR 121

Route 121 is defined in section 421 of the California Streets and Highways Code. The definition omits the concurrency with Route 29 instead of duplicating that segment in the other route's definition in the code:

Route 121 is from:
(a) Route 37 near Sears Point to Route 29 near Napa.
(b) Route 29 in Napa to Route 128.

SR 121 begins at SR 37 in Sears Point, and then runs past the Tolay Lake basin and across Tolay Creek near Infineon Raceway. As it continues northward through Sonoma County, it meets SR 116, where it then veers east. SR 121 then enters Schellville, where it begins a short overlap with SR 12. Upon leaving, it begins another overlap with SR 29, which happens to be a freeway, in Napa County. When it leaves, it continues northward and meets SR 221 in Napa. As it leaves the city, it continues northward for several miles before reaching its north end at SR 128 near Lake Berryessa.

SR 121 is part of the California Freeway and Expressway System, but is not part of the National Highway System, a network of highways that are considered essential to the country's economy, defense, and mobility by the Federal Highway Administration. SR 121 is eligible to be included in the State Scenic Highway System, but it is not officially designated as a scenic highway by the California Department of Transportation. The California Legislature named the route Carneros Highway from its southern terminus to its junction with SR 29 in Napa, after the Carneros settlement. The stretch in Sonoma County between SR 37 and SR 116 runs along Arnold Drive, and along Fremont Drive between SR 116 and the Napa County line.

== History ==
CA 121 was CA 37 from current CA 37 to CA 128 used from 1934 to 1963

The section from SR 37 to SR 29 in Napa remains virtually unchanged since its definition in 1963. The northern section, however, was slightly altered since its definition the same year due to a realignment of various other freeways.

== Major intersections ==
Except where prefixed with a letter, postmiles were measured on the road as it was in 1964, based on the alignment that existed at the time, and do not necessarily reflect current mileage. Postmile prefixes include: R reflecting a realignment in the route since then, M indicating a second realignment, L referring to an overlap due to a correction or change, and T indicating postmiles classified as temporary. Segments that remain unconstructed or have been relinquished to local control may be omitted. The numbers reset at county lines; the start and end postmiles in each county are given in the county column.

County	Location	Postmile	Destinations	Notes
Sonoma; SON 0.00-11.62	Sears Point	0.00	SR 37 – Vallejo, Novato	South end of SR 121
Sonoma; SON 0.00-11.62		6.69	SR 116 west (Arnold Drive) / Bonneau Road – Glen Ellen, Petaluma	Eastern terminus of SR 116
Sonoma; SON 0.00-11.62	Schellville	7.44	SR 12 west (Broadway) – Sonoma, Boyes Hot Springs, Glen Ellen	South end of SR 12 overlap
Sonoma; SON 0.00-11.62		R10.79	Napa Road	
Napa; NAP 0.00-22.08	Napa	R4.47 R8.66 (Note: Indicates that the postmile represents the distance along SR 29 rather than SR 121.)	SR 29 south / SR 12 east – American Canyon, Vallejo, Fairfield	North end of SR 12 overlap; south end of SR 29 overlap
Napa; NAP 0.00-22.08	Napa	R4.47 R8.66	South end of freeway on SR 29	
Napa; NAP 0.00-22.08	Napa	R10.30 R4.47	North end of freeway on SR 29	
Napa; NAP 0.00-22.08	Napa	R10.30 R4.47	SR 29 north / Imola Avenue west – Calistoga	Interchange; north end of SR 29 overlap; SR 29 exit 16
Napa; NAP 0.00-22.08	Napa	6.01	SR 221 south (Napa-Vallejo Highway) / Imola Avenue east – Vallejo	Northern terminus of SR 221
Napa; NAP 0.00-22.08	Napa	6.55	Soscol Avenue north – Downtown Napa	
Napa; NAP 0.00-22.08		9.40	Silverado Trail, Trancas Street	Serves Providence Queen of the Valley Medical Center
Napa; NAP 0.00-22.08		16.07	Wooden Valley Road – Fairfield	
Napa; NAP 0.00-22.08		22.08	SR 128 – Winters, Lake Berryessa, Rutherford	North end of SR 121
1.000 mi = 1.609 km; 1.000 km = 0.621 mi: Concurrency terminus
