= Hydrography of the San Francisco Bay Area =

Waterways and watersheds draining into the bay or Pacific Ocean

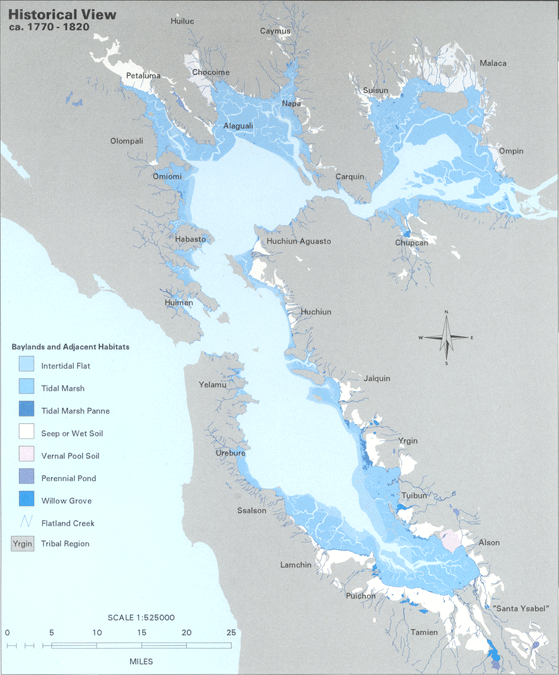

The Hydrography of the San Francisco Bay Area is a complex network of watersheds, marshes, rivers, creeks, reservoirs, and bays predominantly draining into the San Francisco Bay and Pacific Ocean.

== Bays ==
The largest bodies of water in the Bay Area are the San Francisco Bay, San Pablo Bay, and Suisun Bay. The San Francisco Bay is one of the largest bays in the world. Many inlets on the edges of the three major bays are designated as bays in their own right, such as Richardson Bay, San Rafael Bay, Grizzly Bay, and San Leandro Bay.

Nearby bays along the Pacific Coast include Bodega Bay, Tomales Bay, Drakes Bay, Bolinas Bay, and Half Moon Bay.

== Rivers ==
The largest rivers are the Sacramento and San Joaquin Rivers, which drain into the Sacramento-San Joaquin River Delta and thence to Suisun Bay. Other major rivers of the North Bay are the Napa River, the Petaluma River, the Gualala River, and the Russian River; the former two drain into San Pablo Bay, the latter two into the Pacific Ocean.

In the South Bay, the Guadalupe River drains into San Francisco Bay near Alviso.

== Creeks ==
The Bay Area has a network of streams that are generally called creeks, but sometimes called arroyos, due to the Spanish language heritage evident in names such as Santa Rosa Creek and San Pablo Creek. Due to low rainfall in the summer months (May–October), many Bay Area creeks are intermittent, flowing above ground only during part of the year.

Political groups have been formed to preserve creeks or restore creeks which have been culverted for development. Baxter Creek in Contra Costa County has been daylighted in various points along its piped route by Friends of Baxter Creek. Other organizations include Friends of Five Creeks, which monitors, restores, cleans and educates in relation to creeks flowing from the Berkeley Hills to the Eastshore Estuary in the East Bay.

== Springs ==
The Bay Area has springs which are the source of most of the minor creeks in the East Bay hills such as Garrity Creek. In the North Bay there are hot springs which serve as further tourist attractions to Wine Country tourists and spa goers.

== Lakes ==
The Bay Area has many lakes, particularly if one includes artificial ones such as Lake Berryessa. Some are very small (such as Jewel Lake in Berkeley) and others are covered (Summit Reservoir, for example). Lake Merced and Lake Merritt are salt lakes; the former is drying up while the latter is a closed off estuarine cove.

== Aquifers ==
Due to pollution of surface water, much of the area's potable water is located underground, for instance in the Mocho Subbasin of the Livermore Valley. As these aquifers get drawn down by pumping, there is increasing interest in ways to speed up the recharging of these resources.

== Wetlands ==
Prior to the introduction of European agricultural methods, the shores of San Francisco Bay consisted mostly of tidal marshes. Approximately 85% of those marshes have been lost or destroyed, but about 50 marshes and marsh fragments remain. In the Delta area, marshes were drained for farmland. In San Francisco, marshes were filled in for urban development. In the East Bay, portions were used as landfill. In the South Bay, huge tracts have served as commercial salt evaporation ponds. In the North Bay, the Napa Sonoma Marsh and Point Molate Marsh remain productive ecosystems. Some wetlands have been restored or protected from further development. Success stories include Eastshore State Park and Crissy Field. Many native and recovered wetlands are preserved in the Don Edwards San Francisco Bay National Wildlife Refuge and the San Pablo Bay National Wildlife Refuge.

Wetlands also exist on the Pacific Coast (the Estero Americano, for instance) and in certain inland valleys: for example, the Laguna de Santa Rosa near Santa Rosa.

== Transportation ==
The Bay Area is a large natural harbor. Around it have grown seaports and naval facilities. Active ports include the ports of Richmond, Redwood City, San Francisco, and Oakland. Ships also traverse the bay heading to and from ports in Stockton and Sacramento. During World War I and World War II the region was the United States's major shipbuilding center for the Pacific. Former naval facilities include Point Molate Naval Fuel Depot, Alameda Point Naval Facility and Mare Island Naval Shipyard.

Many Bay Area cities have marinas, including Berkeley, Petaluma, and Redwood City.

There is also an extensive commuter ferry system, which is being expanded by the San Francisco Bay Water Transit Authority.

Oceanic harbors have been built at Bodega Bay and Half Moon Bay.

== See also ==
- Ecology of the San Francisco Estuary
- U.S. Army Corps of Engineers Bay Model
