= Lakeville, California =

Unincorporated community in California, United States

- unincorporated community
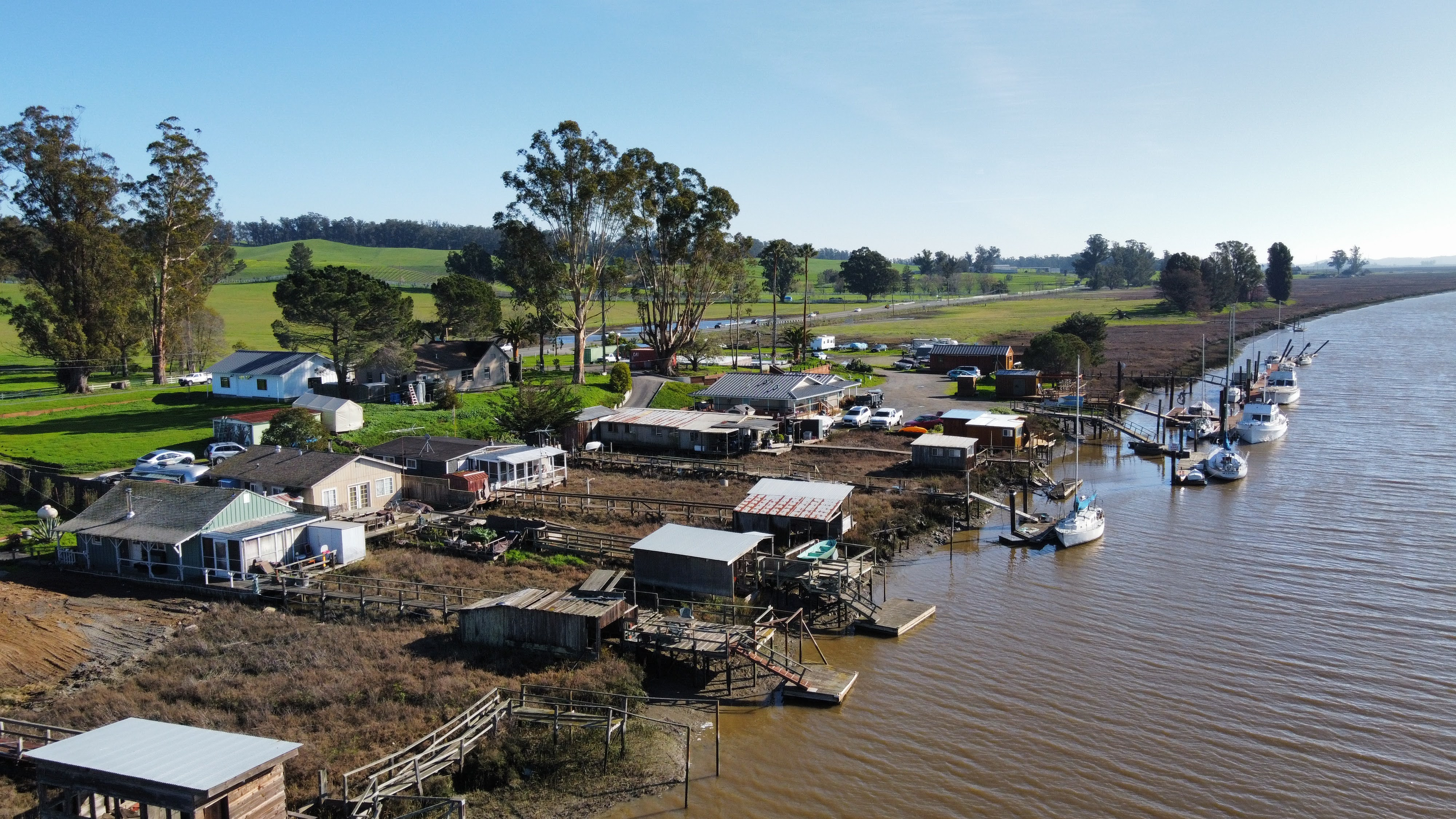
- Lakeville Marina

- Location within the state of California
- Coordinates: 38°11′57″N 122°32′50″W
- Country: United States
- State: California
- County: Sonoma
- Elevation: 9.8 ft (3 m)

Population
  - Total: 67 persons (in 1910)
- Time zone: UTC−8 (Pacific Time Zone)
  - Summer (DST): UTC−7 (PDT)
- ZIP code: 94954
- Area code: 707
- FIPS code: 06-39878
- GNIS feature ID: 1658935

Lakeville is an unincorporated community in Sonoma County, California, United States. It is located near the Petaluma River, about 4 mi (6 km) southeast of Petaluma.

The main thoroughfare is Lakeville Road, which passes north–south through Lakeville on its way from State Route 116 to State Route 37. The rear gate of Sonoma Raceway empties onto Lakeville Road and can cause traffic delays on race days.

Lakeville's name refers to Tolay Lake, about 2 mi (3 km) east of the town.

Lakeville has a fire department with one station, established in 1973. It is located east of the intersection of Lakeville Highway and Stage Gulch Road.

== History ==
The Lakeville area was part of the Rancho Petaluma grant to Mariano Guadalupe Vallejo by the Governor José Figueroa of Alta California in 1834.

In 1859, an emigrant named William Bihler purchased 8,000 acres (32 km^{2}) in the Lakeville area. In 1859 Bihler dynamited the natural dam of the historic Tolay Lake to drain the lake in order to raise potatoes and corn.

Settled by C. H. Bodwell, Lakeville became the terminus for a steamship route connecting San Francisco with Sonoma County. In the 1870s, Lakeville was a stop on the San Francisco and North Pacific Railroad.

In an 1879 tourist guide, Lakeville was described as "not a very pretentious place."

During the 1906 San Francisco earthquake, reported damage in Lakeville included that "chimneys were overthrown, plastering badly cracked, and dishes broken. Chimneys and objects were thrown to the southeast."

Based on the 1910 United States census, the population of Lakeville at that time was computed as 67 persons. Gregory's (1911) History of Sonoma County stated with regard to Sonoma County towns that "some of these places are mere post office stations or small hamlets with nominal population, the figures of which are not given... Lakeville 67."
