= Skaggs Island Naval Communication Station =

Former US military base in the North Bay region, California

Skaggs Island
- Location within San Francisco Bay Area Location within California Location within the United States

Geography
- Location: Northern California
- Coordinates: 38.1903615°N 122.39409°W
- Adjacent to: San Pablo Bay

Administration
- United States
- State: California

Skaggs Island Naval Communication Station is a former United States Navy installation located near California State Route 37 between Novato and Vallejo, California. It was a secretive, secure, and self-contained naval base, engaged in a number of communications and intelligence gathering functions for the Navy and other federal intelligence organizations. The 3,310-acre (13.4 km^{2}) site was purchased by the Navy in 1941, and closed in 1993. The antennas continued to be used for some time after that, but by 2013 they were removed along with all of the remaining buildings.

== Skaggs Island ==
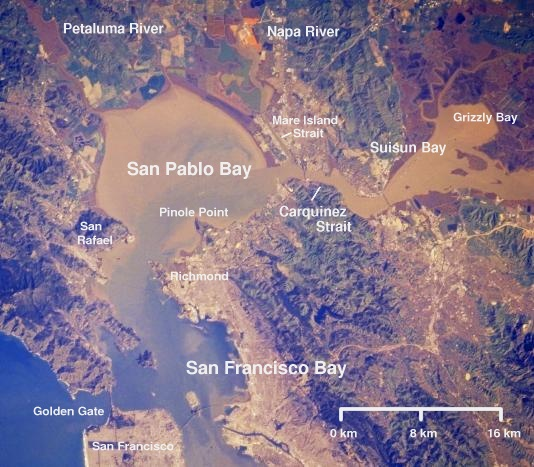
San Pablo Bay and the Carquinez Strait

Skaggs Island was once a thriving tidal marsh next to San Pablo Bay. It is part of the Pacific Flyway for migratory birds and was used extensively by Native Americans until the 1800s, when federal legislation allowed the State of California to fill in wetlands. Senator John P. Jones, of Nevada, purchased 10,000 acres (40 km^{2}) for development by his brother. Chinese laborers, freed from railroad building work, were employed to construct levees to control flooding by Sonoma Creek. The area became a diked wetland area, converted to hay farms and salt ponds, before becoming a United States Navy electronic communications station between 1942 and 1993. The VORTAC radio navigation beacon (Identifier: SGD. Frequency: 112.10 MHz) remains operational. It is a medium-power facility, used by aircraft for low-level enroute navigation.

On March 31, 2011, Skaggs Island became part of the 13,000-acre (53 km^{2}) San Pablo Bay National Wildlife Refuge, created in 1974 to protect migratory birds, wetland habitat and endangered species.

Skaggs Island was named for Marion Barton Skaggs, who financially helped the struggling Sonoma Land Company during the depression of the 1930s.

== See also ==
- Two Rock
- AN/FRD-10, a High-frequency direction finding system at NSGA Skaggs Island during the cold war.
