= Sears Point =

Landform in Sonoma County, California

Coordinates: 38°9′4″N 122°26′52″W

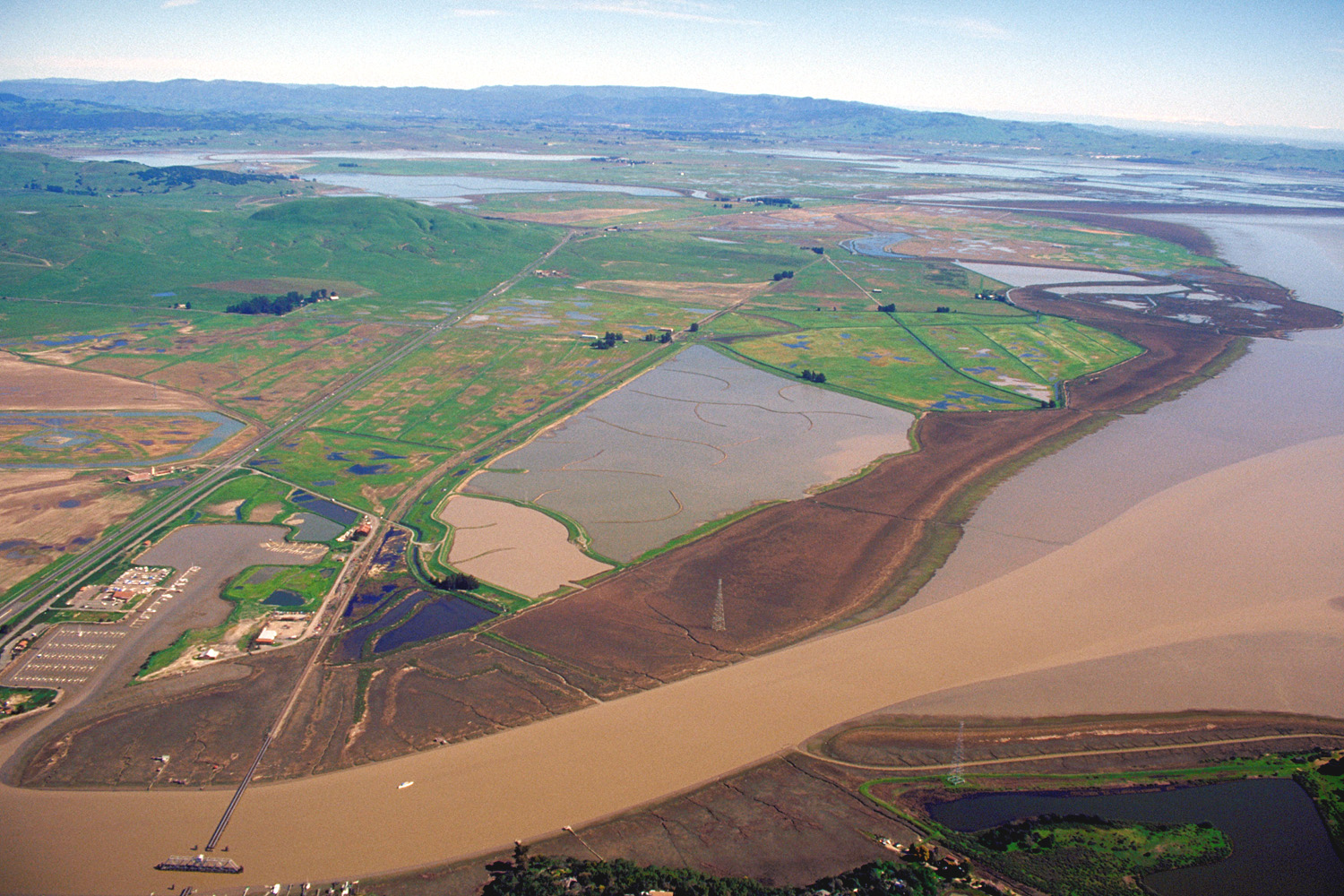
Aerial view of Sears Point and the Napa Sonoma Marsh. View is to the northeast.

Sears Point is a prominent landform that juts into the San Pablo Bay in Sonoma County, California, United States. This hill is the southernmost peak of the Sonoma Mountains and forms the southwestern ridge above Tolay Lake. Starting with European settlement of this area in the mid-19th century considerable modification of the Napa Sonoma Marsh began to occur, such that in contemporary times, there is considerable upland between Sears Point and San Pablo Bay. Numerous local conservation organizations are presently working to restore hundreds of acres of these historic tidal wetlands as part of the Sears Point Wetlands and Watershed Restoration Project. The region can be accessed via State Route 37 or State Route 121.

Sears Point was named after Franklin Sears, who settled on 600 acres (2.4 km^{2}) south of Sonoma in 1851. Later, he partnered with his father-in-law to purchase some 15,000 acres (61 km^{2}), part of which is the present-day Sonoma Raceway racetrack.

== See also ==
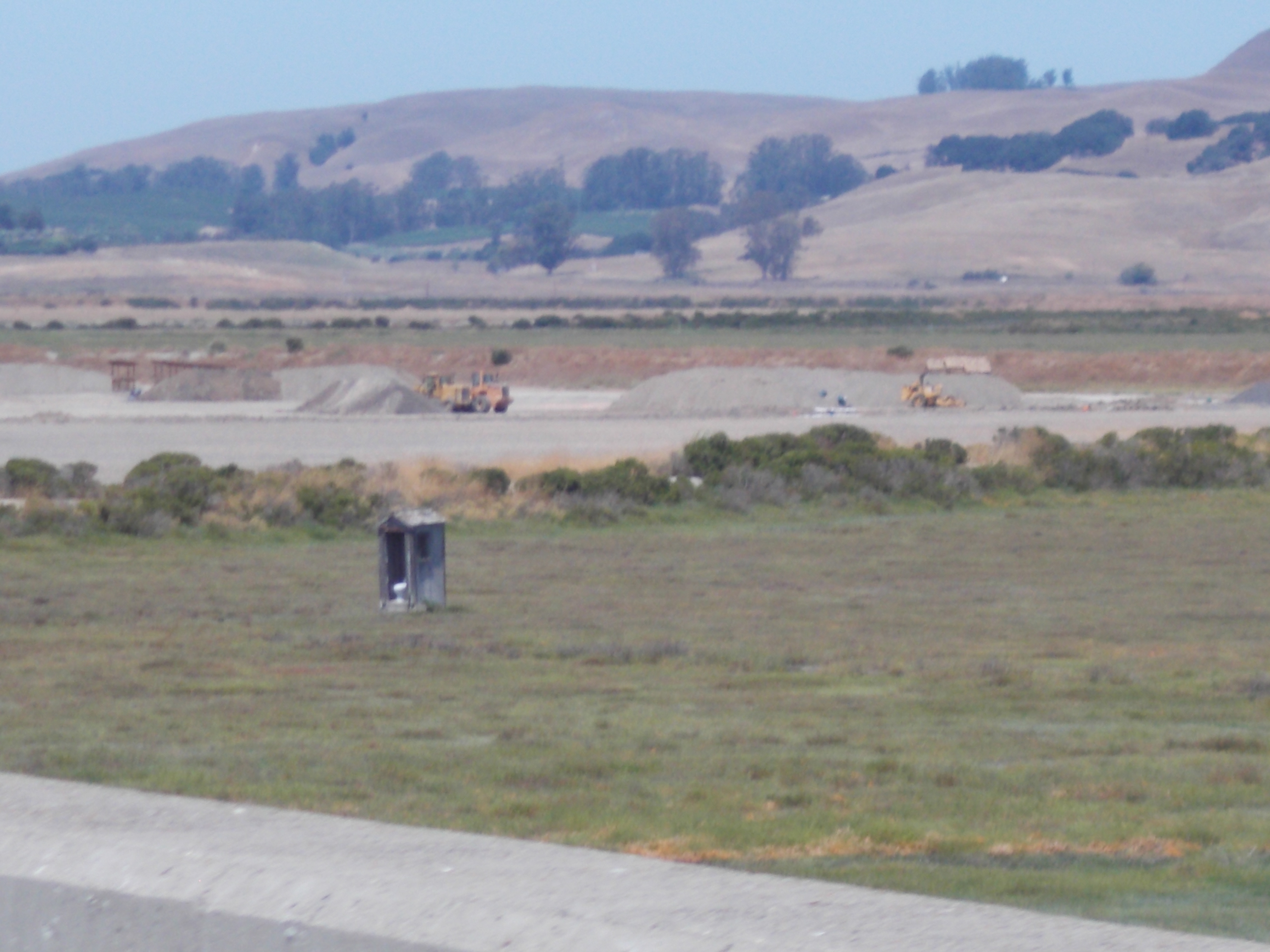
The Lone Toilet on Highway 37 near Sears Point Rd 01

- Coast Miwok
- Sonoma Raceway (formerly Sears Point Raceway)
- Tolay Creek
