= Guernewood Park, California =

Unincorporated community in California, United States

- Location within the state of California
- Coordinates: 38°29′49″N 123°00′45″W
- Country: United States
- State: California
- County: Sonoma
- Elevation: 59 ft (18 m)
- Time zone: UTC-8 (PST)
  - Summer (DST): UTC-7 (PDT)
- ZIP code: 95446
- Area code: 707
- FIPS code: 06-31484
- GNIS feature ID: 1656055

Guernewood Park /ˈɡɜːrnwʊd ˈpɑːrk/ is an unincorporated community in western Sonoma County, California, United States, on the Russian River, 17 mi (27 km) west of Santa Rosa, and 1 mi (1.6 km) west of Guerneville, along State Route 116. Armstrong Redwoods State Reserve and Austin Creek State Recreation Area are to the north.

== History ==
In 1867, George E. Guerne, a young Swiss immigrant, arrived in Stumptown. He purchased land and established a subdivision that became Guernewood Park. He constructed and operated a sawmill in Stumptown (later renamed Guerneville).

After the introduction of the railroad into the Russian River valley in the late 1800s, thousands of San Franciscans flocked to the region each summer. Soon, many of the famous big bands started to provide dance music at packed outdoor venues along the river even into the 1950s. Woody Herman, Tommy Dorsey and other famous names were frequent performers during the Big Band era. Hollywood stars were also frequent visitors.

The 2020 United States Census included Guernewood Park in the figures for the Guerneville census-designated place.
