= Tolay Lake =

Lake in Sonoma County, California

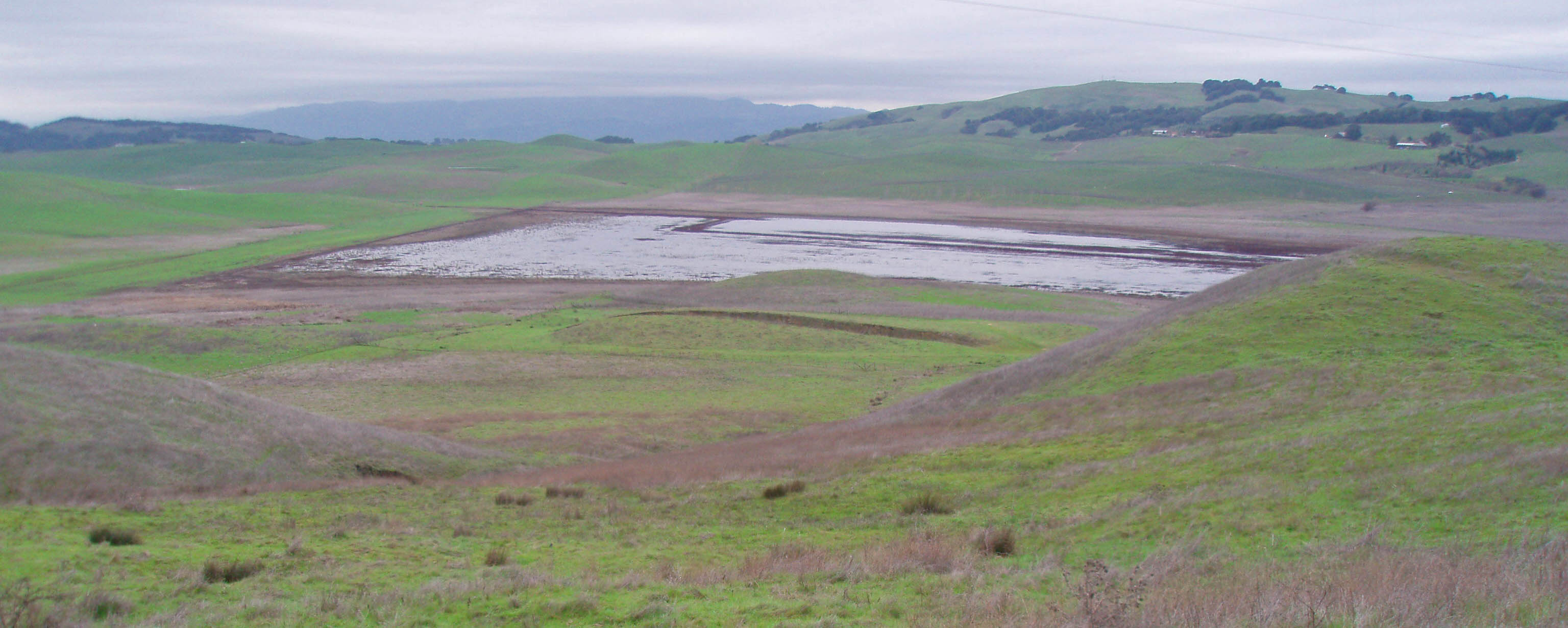
- View from south (February 2007)

- Location within California Location within the United States
- Location: Sonoma County, California
- Coordinates: 38°12′33″N 122°30′50″W
- Primary outflows: Tolay Creek
- Basin countries: United States
- Surface area: 3,434 acres (1,390 ha)
- Max. depth: 8 ft (2.4 m)
- Water volume: 1,200 acre⋅ft (1,500,000 m^{3})
- Shore length^{1}: 2.4 mi (3.9 km)
- Surface elevation: 150 ft (46 m)
- Islands: none
- Settlements: Lakeville
- ^{1} Shore length is not a well-defined measure.

Tolay Lake is a shallow freshwater lake in southern Sonoma County, California, United States. The lake, nestled within the southern vestiges of the Sonoma Mountains, is the site of significant Native American prehistoric seasonal settlement. In 2005, Sonoma County acquired the entirety of the lake and virtually its whole drainage basin from the Cardoza family for the sum of $18 million; the county's intention is to utilize the property as Tolay Lake Regional Park for ecological and archaeological preservation, as well as public use and enjoyment. Tolay Lake and its immediate drainage area is home to several nesting pairs of golden eagles, Aquila chrysaetos, and a number of rare, threatened or endangered species including the California red-legged frog, Rana draytonii; Western pond turtle, Actinemys marmorata; and Western burrowing owl, Athene cunicularia.

Tolay Lake was initially altered about 1850 by European settlers who dynamited a natural earth dam on the lake's south side, in order to enable more intensive agricultural cultivation and grazing of the basin; at times thereafter, the lake typically became almost dry in the summer months, when rainfall in this region is at its seasonal nadir. Another modern alteration is the construction of an east–west earthen causeway that effectively bisects the lake, impeding thorough water circulation and fragmenting plant and animal colonies of the lake.

== History ==
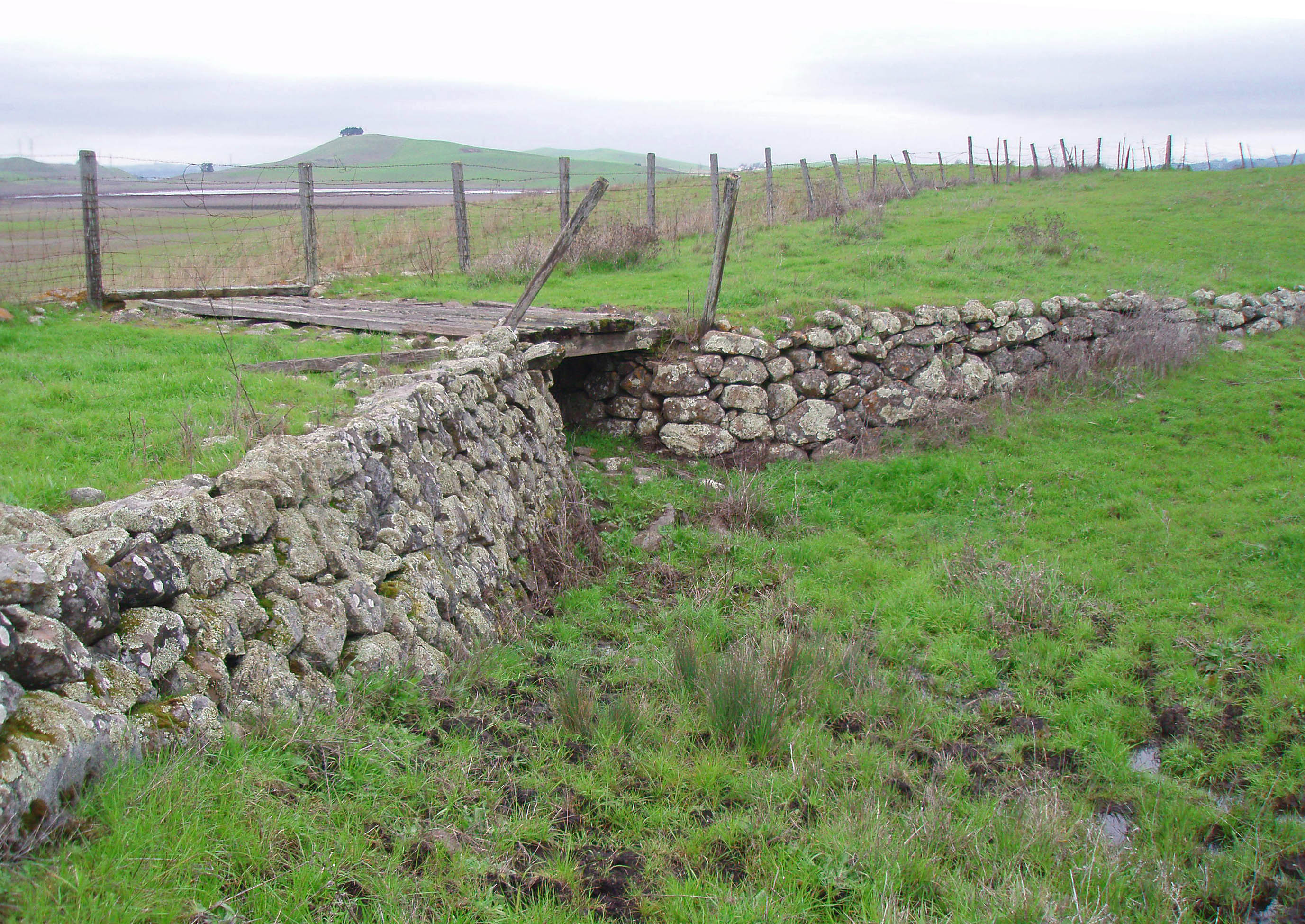
Drystone bridge circa 1900 over Cardoza Creek in the Tolay Lake watershed.

Dating to at least 4,000 years, habitation of the original Tolay Lake perimeter occurred on a seasonal basis by the Coast Miwok, Pomo and other native Californians. It is known that this has been a regional gathering place for diverse tribes, probably associated with the beliefs that healing powers were derived from this lake. One of the main bases for this knowledge is the discovery of many prehistoric charmstones and numerous arrowheads in the lake bed. Evidence suggests that these stones were brought from distant parts of California and as far away as Mexico for a ritual in which the native threw the stone into Tolay Lake, with the belief that this act rid the thrower of affliction or disease or would invoke enhanced crop yields. Some of these artifacts are situated in a small museum on site, and a number of them are within the permanent collection of the Smithsonian Museum. These archaeological findings received such widespread attention that the lake was at one time alternatively known as Charmstone Lake.

Greg Sarris, chairman of the Federated Indians of Graton Rancheria of Coast Miwok or Pomo descent said: "The lake and surrounding area was highly sacred and was considered one of three areas in all of northern California where Indian nomads from different tribes convened for sacred ceremonies and the exchange of ritual objects and songs for the purpose of healing." He also said the 1000 charmstones discovered there, to date are: "the most significant discovery of cultural material for my people, but no doubt for all native people in California."

José Altimíra, founder of Mission San Francisco Solano described the lake in 1823, "We found on said hillock, a little further on, the large lake of Tolay—named after the chief of the Indian nomadic tribals "(Mr.Hukalaka Tolay), who in former times settled there. Its width at some parts is, with little difference, one hundred and fifty varas (420 feet or 130 metres), at others two hundred varas (560 feet or 170 metres), and at one point one-fourth of a league, which is also its length."

In the mid-nineteenth century European settlers began to develop the Tolay Basin agriculturally along with the Sonoma Valley and Petaluma River Basin. Initially the Europeans compromised the natural earthen dam that impeded outflow at the southern end of the lake, primarily by dynamite. This hydrologic change reduced the lake size by approximately 50 percent and enabled more intensive grazing as well as growing of crops. The Tolay Lake basin's agricultural use expanded until about 1940 when the Cardoza family purchased the 1,737 acres (7.03 km^{2}) holding and called it the Cardoza Ranch.

The Cardozas made further improvements to the ranch containing Tolay Lake and retained ownership until 2005. During the Cardoza tenure, numerous road and fence additions were made as well as well crafted dry stone bridge and wall structures; these changes were introduced to facilitate the cattle grazing, pumpkin farming and other farming uses. In 2005 the Board of Supervisors of Sonoma County entered into an option purchase agreement of the entire property for somewhat below the appraised land value. The Cardozas retain ownership to the considerable collection of charmstones found prior to the date of this contract.

Sonoma County exercised its option to purchase and to place this holding into the county's park system. After review of an Environmental Impact Report and creation of infrastructure, the park was fully opened to public access as of October 2018.

== Hydrology ==
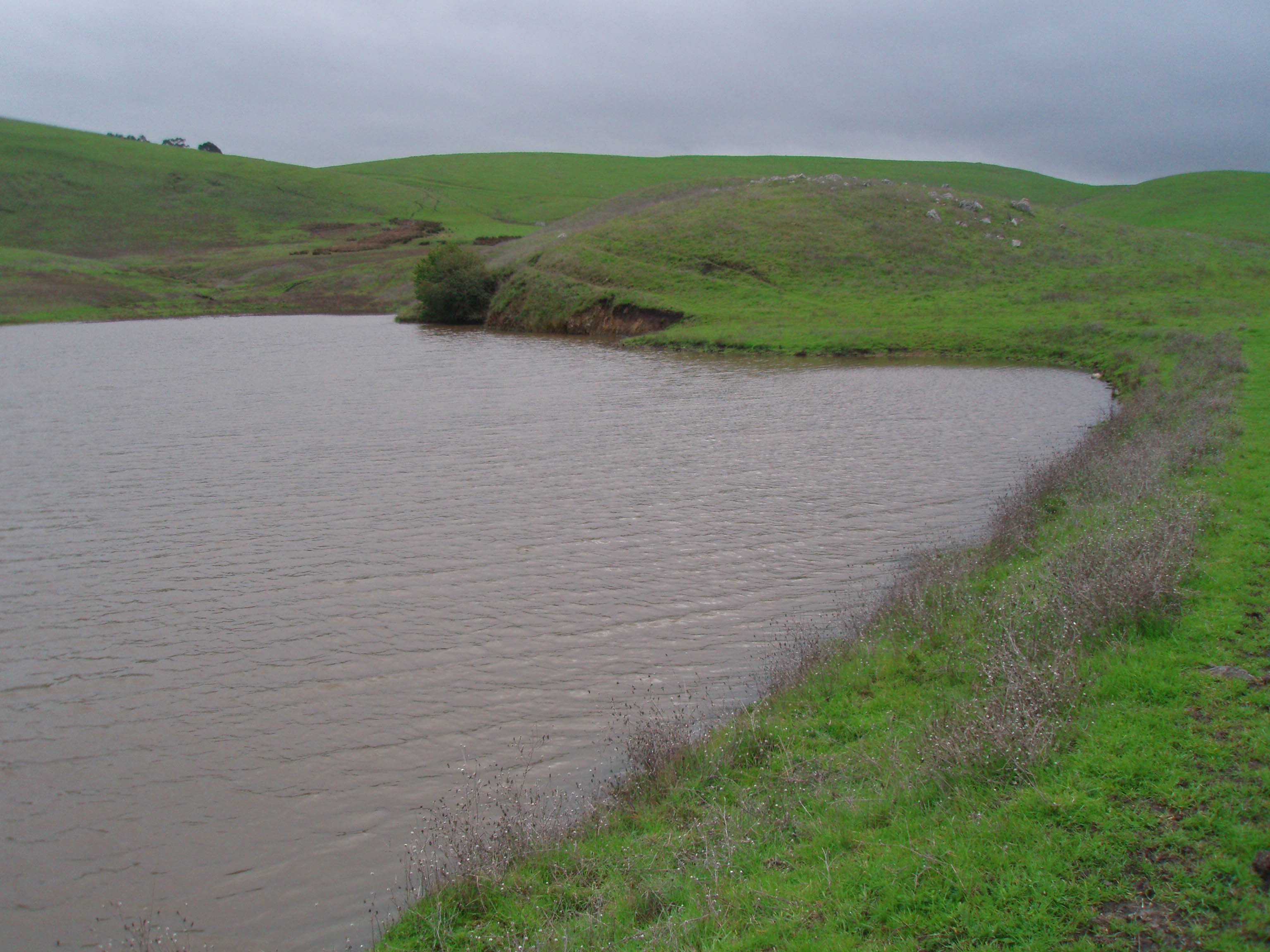
One of the anthropogenic ponds within the Tolay Lake Basin.

The Tolay Lake basin is a bowl-shaped structure confined by two north–south-running ridges of the southern Sonoma Mountains. Tolay Lake is fed by 18 separate springs distributed around the perimeter of the lake, some of which develop into intermittent streams. The largest such stream known as Cardoza Creek feeds Tolay Lake from the southeast. The winter maximum lake depth varies typically between four and eight feet (1 and 2 m) deep depending upon that season's rainfall. Tolay Lake functions more as a large freshwater marsh based upon extensive aquatic vegetation and shallow depths.

The lake surface level is at an altitude of approximately 150 feet (46 m) above mean sea level, while the highest point in the watershed is on Cougar Mountain on the eastern ridge, which attains an elevation of about 800 feet (240 m). At the southern end of the lake Tolay Creek provides a virtually perennial outlet; Tolay Creek thence flows in a southerly course to discharge into the Napa Sonoma Marsh adjoining San Pablo Bay, the northern arm of San Francisco Bay. There are several ponds within the Tolay Lake Basin, including two large artificial ponds clearly separate from the lake; these ponds serve as watering sources for cattle and are also habitat to some of the native species of amphibians and reptiles associated with Tolay Lake. Another modern alteration is the construction of an east–west earthen causeway that effectively bisects the lake, impeding thorough water circulation and fragmenting plant and animal colonies of the lake. Annual rainfall in the Tolay Lake Basin is approximately 29 inches (740 mm).

== Architectural/cultural ==
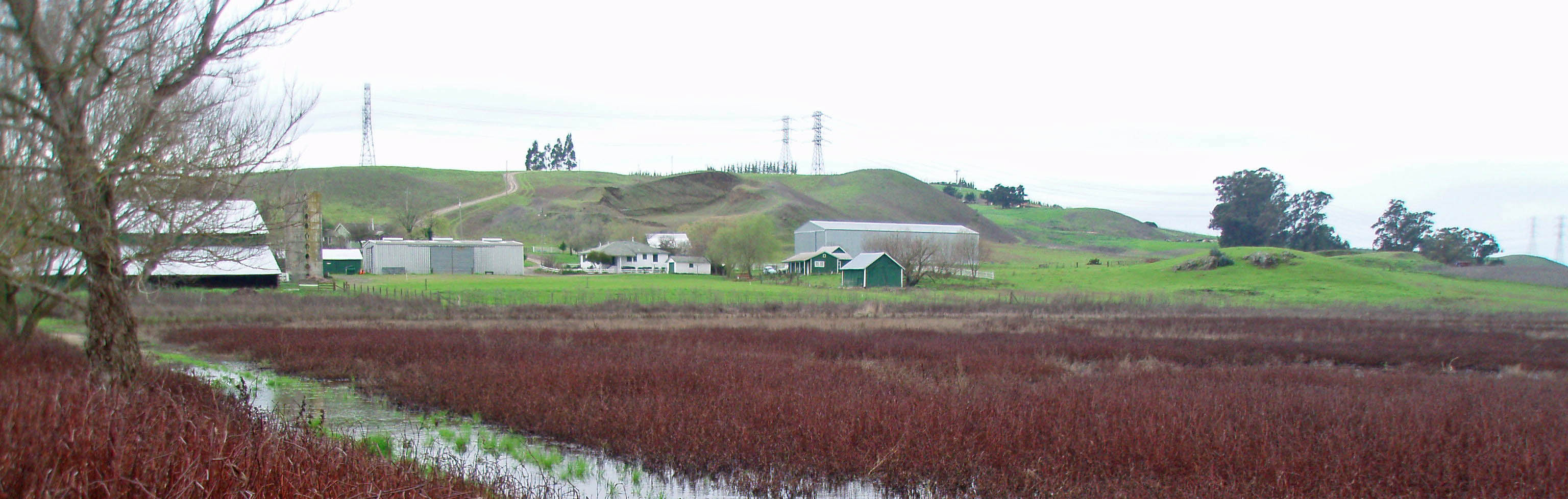
Cardoza Ranch buildings on south side of Tolay Lake.

Present in the Tolay Lake Basin are a number of well-preserved architectural features, most notably a set of ranch buildings, many of which date from the first half of the twentieth century. Most of these structures were erected by the Cardoza family as integral elements of a working ranch. They represent an opportunity for preservation not only of an architectural style from this earlier era, but also as a complete collection of the building types involved in a broad function Sonoma County ranch, not dissimilar in function to its nineteenth-century predecessor. The county is analyzing alternative uses of some of the structures that not only offer preservation, but integration into the educational themes that are to embody the future Tolay Ranch Regional Park.

The county is also actively consulting with representatives of Native American groups that are descendants of early tribes who used the site. These discussions are for the purpose of portraying the lives of prehistoric inhabitants in a faithful and sympathetic manner, and examining opportunities for cultural education. For example, this project offers an opportunity for the Native American community to cultivate and restore large tracts of purple needle grass, California's official state grass. This grass is the preferred material utilized by the California Indian basket weavers for teaching children the art of basket weaving.

== Flora and fauna ==
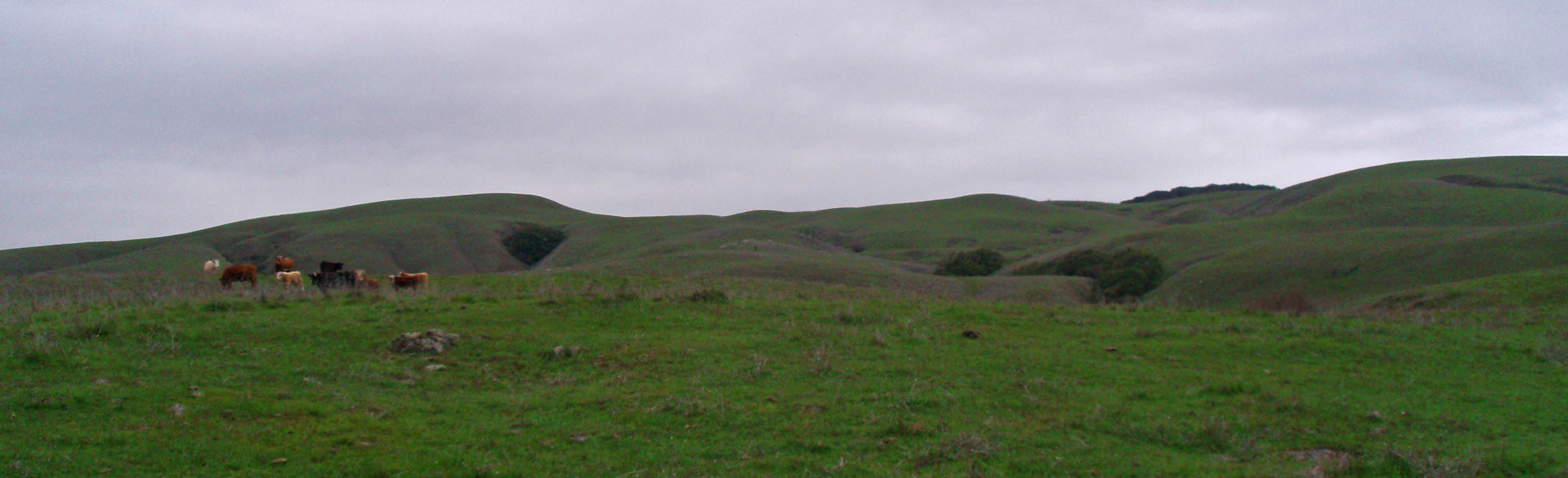
Northern ridge above Tolay Lake showing oak woodland pockets where golden eagles nest, with cows grazing in foreground.

Considerable biodiversity is found in Tolay Lake and the surrounding hills of the Sonoma Mountains; historical habitats include the lacustrine or marsh environment; grasslands and California oak woodland on higher elevations especially in the steep upland ravine areas. The lake itself has a diverse flora and fauna, including several threatened and endangered species including the California red-legged frog, Rana draytonii and western pond turtle, Actinemys marmorata.

Because of the numerous natural fresh water seeps, wildlife is abundant in the Tolay watershed, including the upland areas. The valley harbors several significant species, including the burrowing owl, Athene cunicularia; golden eagle, Aquila chrysaetos; white-tailed kite, Elanus leucurus; California horned lark, Eremophila alpestris; and the endangered tricolored blackbird, Agelaius tricolor. Tolay Lake is also one of only two known locations in the Bay Area that produce a special "moist prairie grass".

== Habitat restoration ==
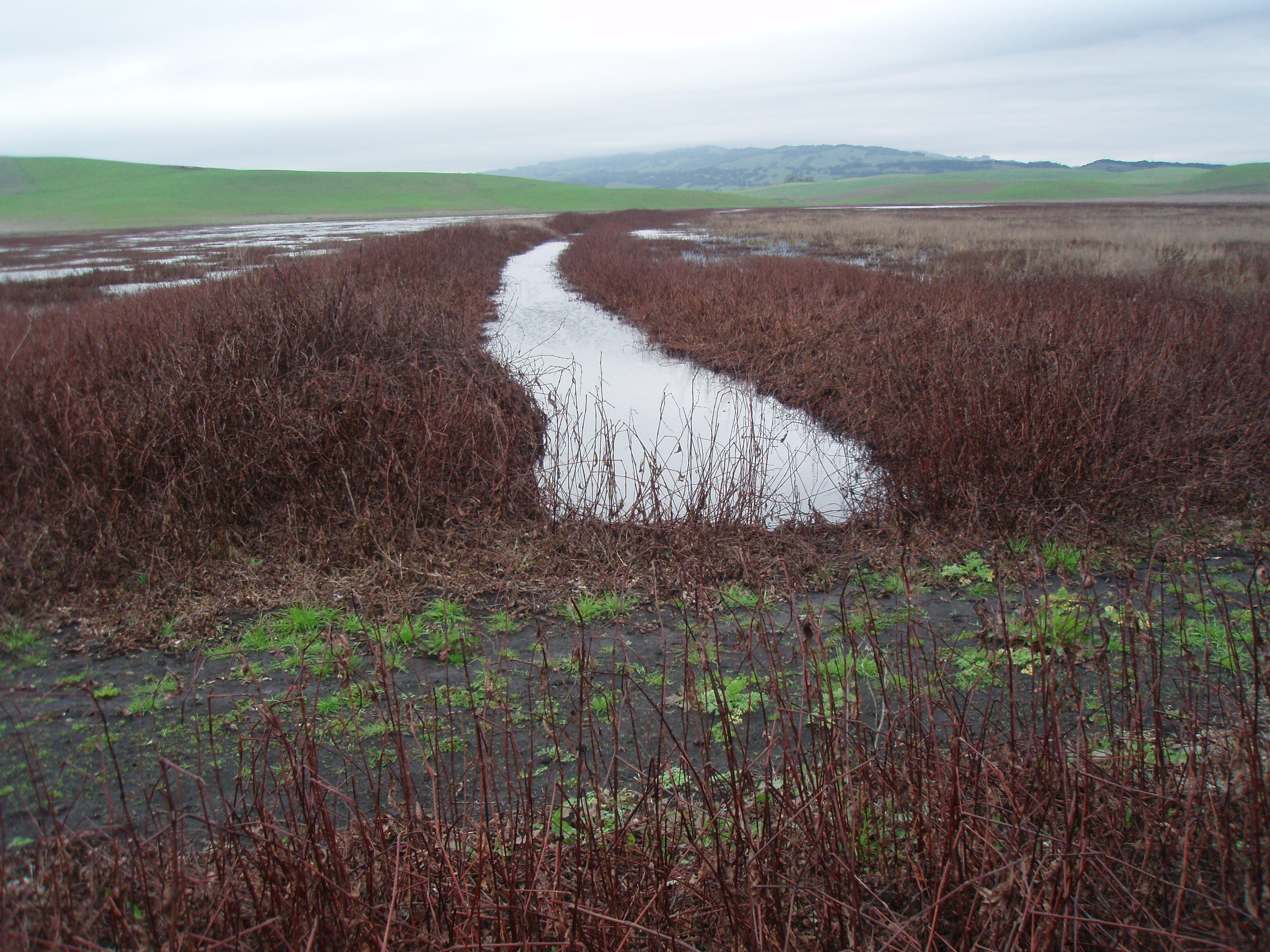
Looking across upper Tolay Lake from atop the earthen causeway, showing introduction of unnatural channelization from culvert placed into the causeway.

One of Sonoma County's primary purposes in acquiring the Tolay Lake watershed is the ecological restoration of this area to its pre-European settlement condition. In that earlier era the lake would have been double its present size and native marshes, grasslands and even some upland forested areas would have been in greater evidence, prior to the destructive force of cattle grazing and other intensive agricultural practices. Sonoma County is accepting public comment as of February, 2007 to understand the views of scientists and the general public regarding the outcome restoration strategy and how that is balanced with some form of public access.

For the lake itself, there is the prospect of greater size, depth and increased water circulation; additionally there is the potential of re-integration of the two lake segments, which are presently divided by the man-made earthen causeway. Breaching of this causeway would mitigate the effects of fragmented floral and faunal colonies and associated pressures of local colony extinction.

Tolay Lake restoration fits into a regional mosaic of open space, conservation easements and wildlife areas in the process of being enhanced. These efforts all link to the wetlands and uplands adjoining the San Pablo Bay marshes, which areas are known to comprise one half of all the wetlands capable of restoration in the entirety of San Francisco Bay. Ongoing vicinity acquisition efforts further expand the regional landscape of baylands restoration: Petaluma Marsh properties, Dickson Ranch, the New North Point former casino site, and Skaggs Island. According to a non-profit environmental organization, Friends of Tolay Lake Park: The Tolay land acquisition is magnified by "this integrated effort to regain some of the connections and integrity of the area’s natural systems; together, their restoration will greatly improve the chances of survival for endangered marsh and upland species and will contribute to the overall health of San Francisco Bay".

One drawback to the site ecological restoration is the presence of a major noise generator, Sonoma Raceway, immediately to the southeast; the potential effects of raceway noise upon the future desired wildlife enhancement has not been thoroughly investigated. Scientists know from studies in other areas that some animal species are sensitive to man-made noise and may limit their use of certain locales heavily impacted by noise.

== See also ==
- Lakeville, California
- List of lakes in California
- List of lakes in the San Francisco Bay Area
- List of Sonoma County Regional Parks facilities
- Napa Sonoma Marsh
- Sears Point
- Wetlands Reserve Program
