= California State Route 12 =

State highway in California

State Route 12
- SR 12 highlighted in red

Route information
- Maintained by Caltrans
- Length: 140.64 mi (226.34 km)
- Existed: 1934–present
- Tourist routes: Valley of the Moon Highway between Santa Rosa and Agua Caliente

Major junctions
- West end: SR 116 in Sebastopol
- US 101 in Santa Rosa; SR 121 from Schellville to Napa; SR 29 from Napa to east of Napa; I-80 in Fairfield; I-680 in Fairfield; SR 160 in Rio Vista; I-5 west of Lodi; SR 99 in Lodi; SR 88 from Lockeford to Clements; SR 26 from Valley Springs to east of Valley Springs
- East end: SR 49 in San Andreas

Location
- Country: United States
- State: California
- Counties: Sonoma, Napa, Solano, Sacramento, San Joaquin, Calaveras

Highway system
- State highways in California; Interstate; US; State; Scenic; History; Pre‑1964; Unconstructed; Deleted; Freeways
← SR 11	→ SR 13

State Route 12 (SR 12) is a state highway in the U.S. state of California that travels in an east–west direction from SR 116 in Sebastopol in Sonoma County to SR 49 just north of San Andreas in Calaveras County. The route connects the Sonoma and Napa valleys with the Sacramento–San Joaquin River Delta and the Sierra Foothills. It is constructed to freeway standards from the Fulton Road/South Wright Road stoplight in Santa Rosa, to its partial interchange with Farmers Lane (also in Santa Rosa).

== Route description ==
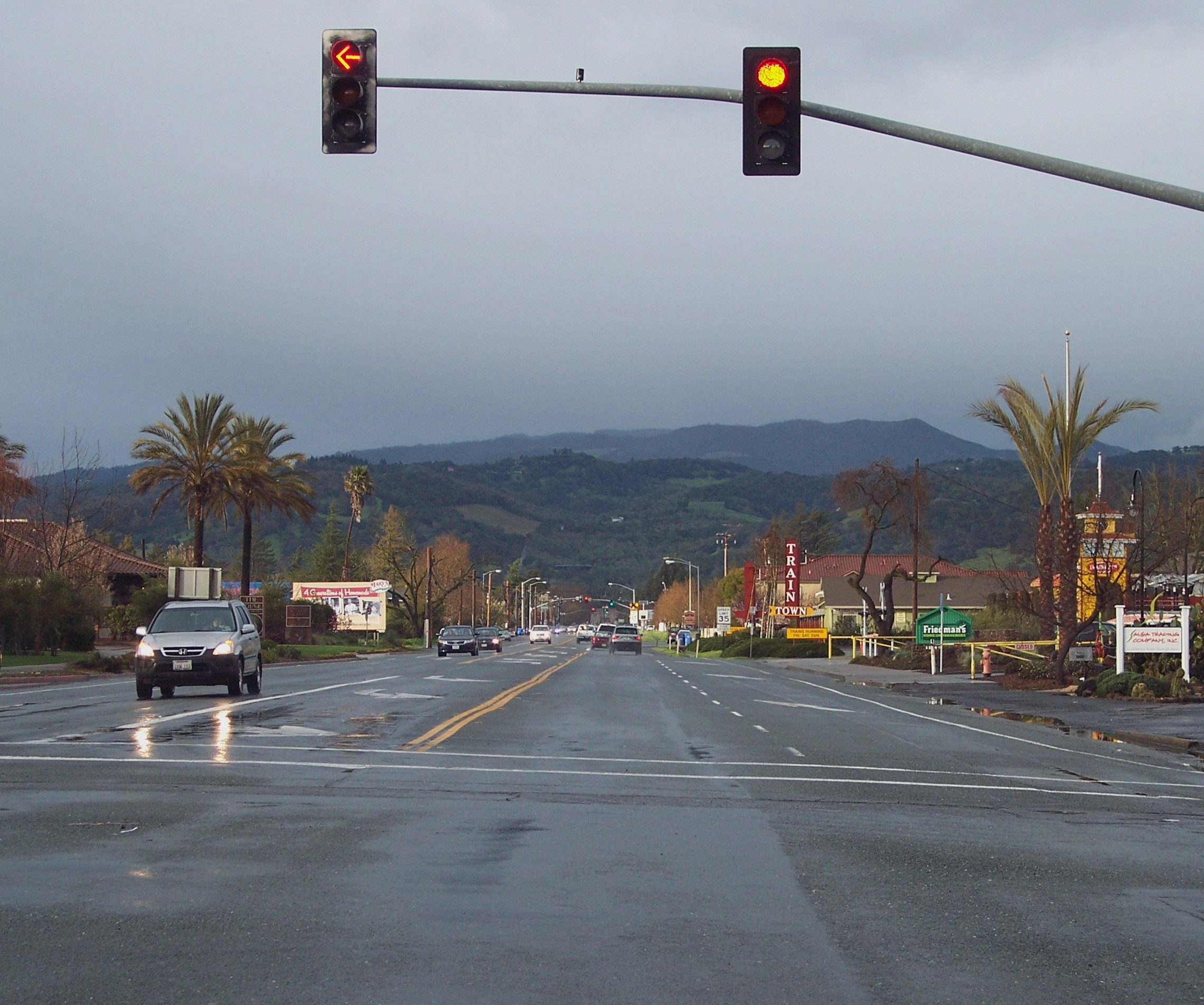
SR 12 runs along Broadway in Sonoma.

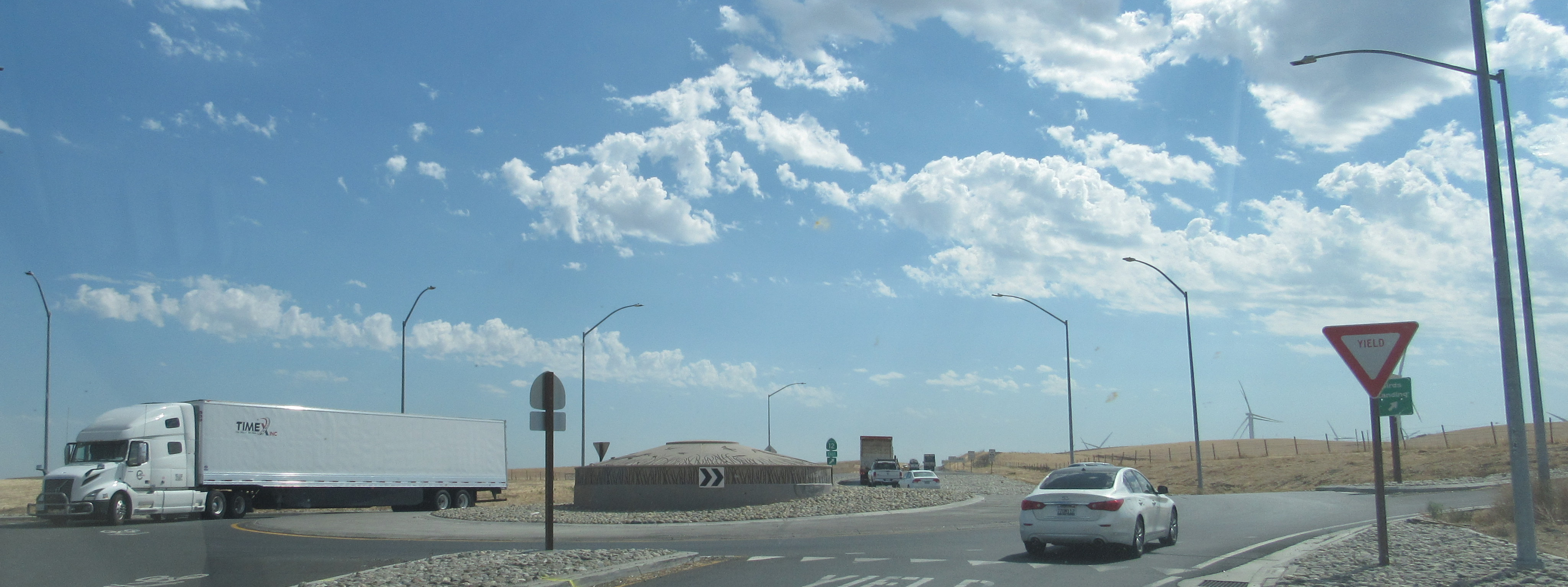
SR 12/SR 113 roundabout

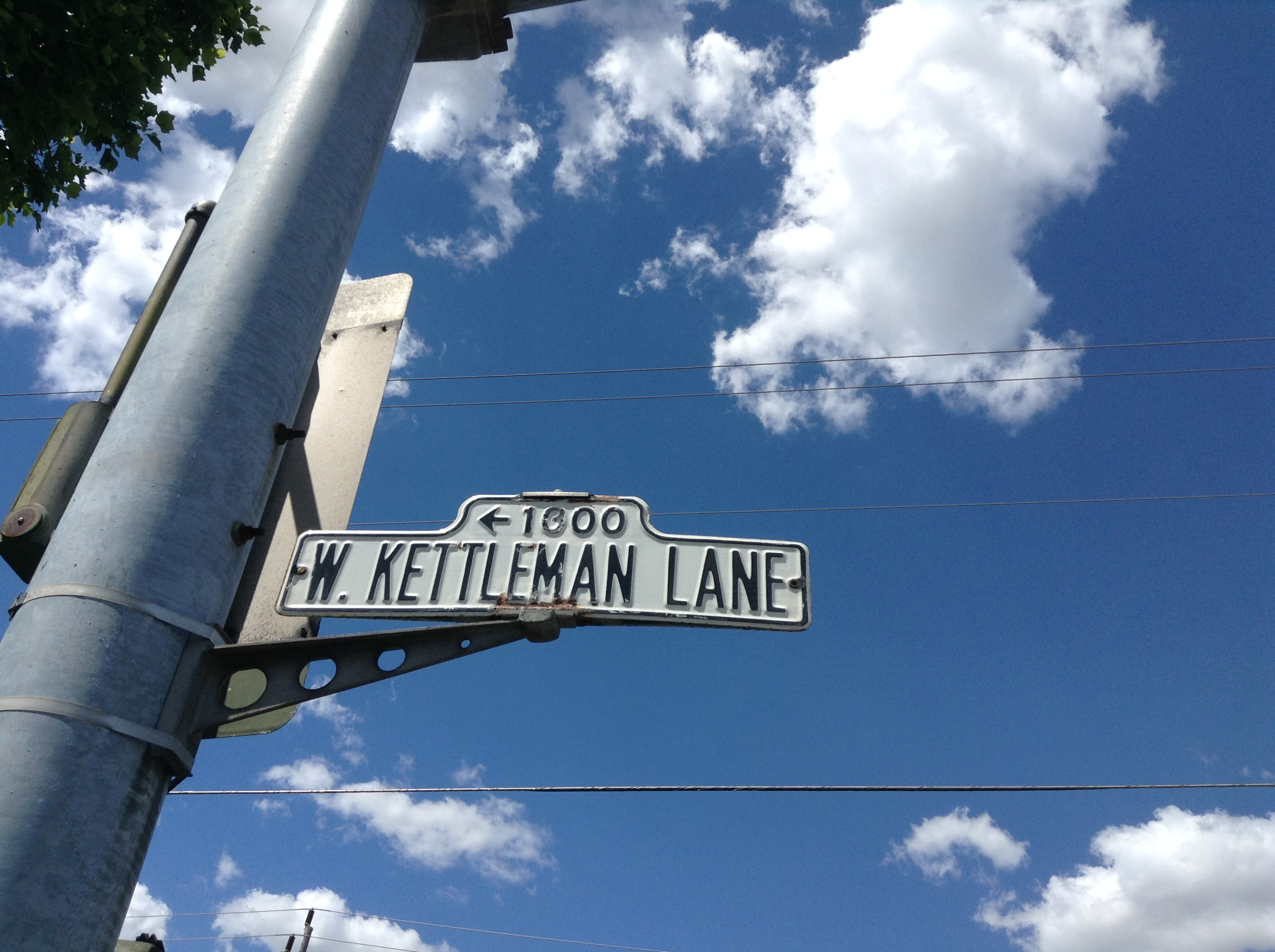
SR 12 runs along Kettleman Lane in Lodi.

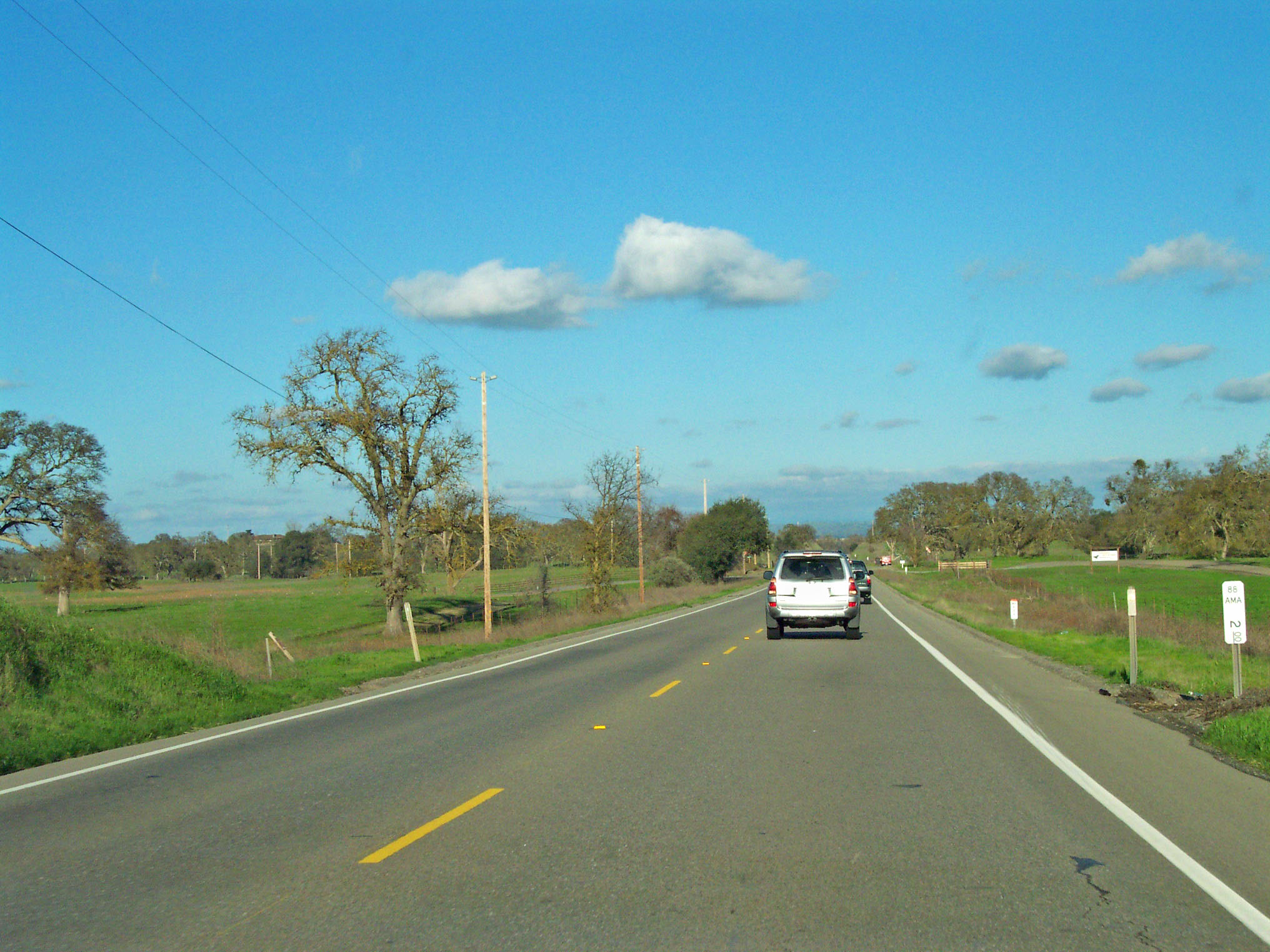
SR 12 between Lodi and Jackson

Route 12 is defined as follows in section 312 of the California Streets and Highways Code:

Route 12 is from:
(a) Route 1 near Valley Ford to Route 121 near Sonoma via Santa Rosa.
(b) Route 29 in the vicinity of Napa to Route 80 near Cordelia.
(c) Route 80 near Fairfeld to Route 99 near Lodi via Rio Vista.
(d) Route 99 near Lodi to Route 88 near Lockeford.
(e) Route 88 near Clements to Route 49 near San Andreas.

Route 12 was never fully constructed to extend west to near Valley Ford as it is defined. The definition also omits five of the six total segments that are overlaps with other highways instead of duplicating those segments in those other routes' definitions in the code. The six total segments of SR 12 that are overlaps are as follows: in the Napa and Sonoma valleys with SR 121, in the southern Napa Valley with SR 29, a short overlap with I-80 at Cordelia Junction in Fairfield, another short overlap with SR 99 in Lodi, and overlaps with SR 88 and SR 26 in the Sierra foothills. The highway is mainly two lane rural highway, with the exception of short segments in Santa Rosa and Fairfield/Suisun City, the overlaps with I-80 and SR 99, and segments within developed areas, such as Santa Rosa and Lodi.

SR 12 begins in the west at its junction with SR 116 in Sebastopol. After passing east through Santa Rosa on a mix of freeway, surface street, and expressway, it turns south into the Sonoma Valley, passing the Jack London State Historic Park at Glen Ellen. It winds through Sonoma on surface streets, where the historic Vallejo Estate and Sonoma Mission, both part of the Sonoma State Historic Park, are.

South of Sonoma, SR 12 turns east, joining SR 121 for nearly nine miles, then turns south briefly as it leaves SR 121 and joins the four-lane expressway SR 29 to cross the Napa River. Four miles after joining SR 29 it splits off towards the east on Jameson Canyon Road; this section is also the 1928 re-alignment of the Lincoln Highway, the first road across America. After a brief merge with Interstate 80, SR 12 branches off to the east as an expressway through Fairfield and Suisun City. East of Suisun it becomes two lanes again and crosses south of Travis Air Force Base, through rolling fields with numerous wind turbines. Just past Braid's Bridge is the Western Railway Museum. At Rio Vista, SR 12 crosses the Helen Madere Memorial Bridge over the Sacramento River, entering the California Delta.

This stretch of the river has twice been the site of much-publicized inland excursions by humpback whales, presumably veering off course while making their annual migrations along the Pacific coast. In 1985 Humphrey the whale swam about as far as the Rio Vista Bridge. In 2007 a humpback mother and calf dubbed Delta and Dawn circled for several days just upstream of the bridge, seemingly reluctant to pass under it again after having spent the previous three or four weeks upriver near Sacramento.

From the Sacramento River to the junction with Interstate 5, SR 12 crosses several of the waterways of the California Delta and the low-lying fields between them. Through Lodi it becomes a wide four-lane business route. After another brief merger with another freeway, this time SR 99, SR 12 heads east into the Sierra foothills (with shared segments with SR 88 and SR 26) before ending at the junction with SR 49 just north of San Andreas.

SR 12 is part of the California Freeway and Expressway System, and in Sebastopol, from US 101 to Sonoma, and from I-80 to SR 88 is part of the National Highway System, a network of highways that are considered essential to the country's economy, defense, and mobility by the Federal Highway Administration. SR 12 is eligible to be included in the State Scenic Highway System; however, it is only designated as a scenic highway from its intersection with Danielli Avenue east of Santa Rosa to its junction with London Way near Agua Caliente, meaning that it is a substantial section of highway passing through a "memorable landscape" with no "visual intrusions", where the potential designation has gained popular favor with the community.

SR 12 has been designated by various state laws and through local usage as the Valley of the Moon Scenic Route (the portion running through Sonoma County, though the first sign with this name is at the intersection of Farmers Lane and Fourth Street in Santa Rosa); Luther Burbank Memorial Highway from Santa Rosa to Sebastopol (after botanist Luther Burbank). SR 12 is also known as Sonoma Highway between Santa Rosa and the west side of the city of Sonoma; Broadway between Sonoma Plaza and its junction with SR 121 in Schellville; Carneros Highway for the length of its concurrency with 121 between Schellville and its junction and the north end of its concurrency with SR 29 near Napa; Jameson Canyon Road from where its concurrency with SR 29 ends in American Canyon to its junction with I-80 in Cordelia; and Rio Vista Highway from I-80 to SR 160 east of Rio Vista, and informally as "Blood Alley" from Lodi to Fairfield. The segment through Lodi to the overlap with SR 99 is on Kettleman Lane.

== History ==
Before the 1964 renumbering, this route was signed as Sign Route 12 for most of its length. However, SR 12 was designated as Legislative Route 51 (LR 51) from SR 116 to SR 121 before the 1964 renumbering. Portions of the route from SR 29 to I-80 ran concurrently with State Route 29 and State Route 37; this was also LR 8 and a former routing of US 40. The portion from I-80 to then-US 99 was designated as LR 53 in 1919; from US 99 to SR 49, it was designated as LR 24.

In 1976, the discontinuity resulting from the concurrency with State Route 84 was removed.

In January 1996, photographer Charles O'Rear pulled off the highway east of Schellville near the Napa–Sonoma county line to photograph the lush hillside by the road. The image became known as Bliss and was used as the default computer wallpaper of Microsoft's Windows XP operating system.

== Future extension ==
Plans call for a western extension of its western terminus to SR 1 near Bodega Bay. Plans also called for Route 12 to be built as a freeway from Farmers Lane to Melita Road, in Santa Rosa; however, as of 2014, this project was delayed due to community opposition.

== Major intersections ==
Except where prefixed with a letter, postmiles were measured on the road as it was in 1964, based on the alignment that existed at the time, and do not necessarily reflect current mileage. Postmile prefixes include: R reflecting a realignment in the route since then, M indicating a second realignment, L referring to an overlap due to a correction or change, and T indicating postmiles classified as temporary. Segments that remain unconstructed or have been relinquished to local control may be omitted. The numbers reset at county lines; the start and end postmiles in each county are given in the county column.

County	Location	Postmile	Exit	Destinations	Notes
Sonoma; SON 9.12-41.36	Sebastopol	9.12		Bodega Avenue – Bodega Bay	Continuation beyond SR 116
Sonoma; SON 9.12-41.36	Sebastopol	9.12		SR 116 (Petaluma Avenue, Main Street) – San Francisco, Jenner	West end of SR 12
Sonoma; SON 9.12-41.36	Santa Rosa	R12.94		Fulton Road, Wright Road	
Sonoma; SON 9.12-41.36	Santa Rosa		West end of freeway		
Sonoma; SON 9.12-41.36	Santa Rosa	R14.45	5	Stony Point Road	
Sonoma; SON 9.12-41.36	Santa Rosa	R15.30	6	Dutton Avenue	
Sonoma; SON 9.12-41.36	Santa Rosa	R16.04	7A	US 101 – San Francisco, Eureka	Signed as exits 7A (south) and 7B (north) westbound; US 101 exit 488B
Sonoma; SON 9.12-41.36	Santa Rosa	R16.63	7B	South E Street – Downtown Santa Rosa	Signed as exit 7C westbound
Sonoma; SON 9.12-41.36	Santa Rosa		East end of freeway		
Sonoma; SON 9.12-41.36	Santa Rosa	T17.53		Farmers Lane	
Sonoma; SON 9.12-41.36	Schellville	41.36 7.44 (Note: Indicates that the postmile represents the distance along SR 121 rather than SR 12.)		SR 121 south (Fremont Drive) – Petaluma, San Francisco	West end of SR 121 overlap
Napa; NAP 0.00-3.31	Napa	R4.47 R8.66 (Note: Indicates that the postmile represents the distance along SR 29 rather than SR 12.)		SR 29 north / SR 121 north – Napa, Calistoga	East end of SR 121 overlap; west end of SR 29 overlap
Napa; NAP 0.00-3.31		R6.20		SR 221 north (Napa-Vallejo Highway) – Napa, Lake Berryessa	Southern terminus of SR 221; double roundabout interchange; Soscol Ferry Road not accessible westbound
Napa; NAP 0.00-3.31		4.71 0.00		SR 29 south / Airport Boulevard – Vallejo, Napa County Airport	East end of SR 29 overlap
Solano; SOL 0.00-26.41	Fairfield	2.43		Red Top Road to I-80 west – San Francisco	Eastbound exit only
Solano; SOL 0.00-26.41	Fairfield	R2.79 R11.98 (Note: Indicates that the postmile represents the distance along I-80 rather than SR 12.)		I-80 west – San Francisco	West end of I-80 overlap; westbound exit and eastbound entrance; I-80 west exit 39B; no entrance from I-80 east
Solano; SOL 0.00-26.41	Fairfield	R2.79 R11.98	West end of freeway on I-80		
Solano; SOL 0.00-26.41	Fairfield	12.74	40	Green Valley Road	Westbound exit is part of exit 41
Solano; SOL 0.00-26.41	Fairfield	12.84	40	I-680 south – Benicia, Martinez, San Jose	Northern terminus of I-680; former SR 21 south; I-680 north exits 71A-B
Solano; SOL 0.00-26.41	Fairfield	13.49	41	Suisun Valley Road, Pittman Road	
Solano; SOL 0.00-26.41	Fairfield	15.82 L1.80		I-80 east – Sacramento	East end of I-80 overlap; eastbound exit and westbound entrance; I-80 west exit 43
Solano; SOL 0.00-26.41	Fairfield	L2.22	56	Chadbourne Road to I-80 east – Fairfield Auto Mall, Sacramento	
Solano; SOL 0.00-26.41	Fairfield		East end of freeway		
Solano; SOL 0.00-26.41	Suisun City	R4.47	58A	Webster Street, Jackson Street – Fairfield	Interchange
Solano; SOL 0.00-26.41	Suisun City	R4.57	58B	Main Street – Suisun City Business District	Interchange
Solano; SOL 0.00-26.41		19.17		SR 113 north / Birds Landing Road – Dixon, Birds Landing, Collinsville	Roundabout; southern terminus of SR 113
Solano; SOL 0.00-26.41	Rio Vista	26.28		SR 84 north / Front Street – Rio Vista, Ryer Island	Interchange; southern terminus of SR 84 northern segment
Solano–Sacramento county line	Rio Vista city limit		Rio Vista Bridge over the Sacramento River		
Sacramento; SAC 0.00-6.20		0.57		SR 160 (River Road) – Isleton, Sacramento, Antioch	
San Joaquin; SJ 0.00-27.64		10.17		I-5 – Sacramento, Stockton, Los Angeles	Interchange; I-5 exit 485
San Joaquin; SJ 0.00-27.64		10.30		CR J8 (Thornton Road)	
San Joaquin; SJ 0.00-27.64	Lodi	15.16		CR J10 (Lower Sacramento Road) – Woodbridge	
San Joaquin; SJ 0.00-27.64	Lodi	16.93		CR J3 (Hutchins Street)	Northern terminus of CR J3
San Joaquin; SJ 0.00-27.64	Lodi	17.95		SR 99 Bus. (Cherokee Lane) – Central District	Former US 50 / US 99
San Joaquin; SJ 0.00-27.64	Lodi	18.07 29.50 (Note: Indicates that the postmile represents the distance along SR 99 rather than SR 12.)		SR 99 south / Kettleman Lane – Fresno, Los Angeles	Interchange; west end of SR 99 overlap; SR 99 exit 264B
San Joaquin; SJ 0.00-27.64	Lodi	18.07 29.50	West end of freeway on SR 99		
San Joaquin; SJ 0.00-27.64	Lodi	30.97 18.08	East end of freeway on SR 99		
San Joaquin; SJ 0.00-27.64	Lodi	30.97 18.08		SR 99 north / Victor Road – Sacramento, Central Lodi	Interchange; east end of SR 99 overlap; SR 99 exit 266
San Joaquin; SJ 0.00-27.64	Lockeford	L23.29 L12.24 (Note: Indicates that the postmile represents the distance along SR 88 rather than SR 12.)		SR 88 west / Victor Road – Stockton	West end of SR 88 overlap
San Joaquin; SJ 0.00-27.64	Lockeford	13.60		CR J5 (Jack Tone Road)	West end of CR J5 overlap
San Joaquin; SJ 0.00-27.64	Lockeford	14.08		CR J5 (Elliott Road) / Tully Road	East end of CR J5 overlap
San Joaquin; SJ 0.00-27.64	Clements	19.17 23.17		SR 88 east – Ione, Jackson, Lake Tahoe	East end of SR 88 overlap
Calaveras; CAL 0.00-18.20	Valley Springs	9.93		SR 26 west / Laurel Street – Linden, Campo Seco, Pardee Reservoir, Lake Amador	West end of SR 26 overlap
Calaveras; CAL 0.00-18.20		13.87		SR 26 east / Toyon Circle – Mokelumne Hill	East end of SR 26 overlap
Calaveras; CAL 0.00-18.20		18.20		SR 49 – Mokelumne Hill, San Andreas	East end of SR 12
1.000 mi = 1.609 km; 1.000 km = 0.621 mi: Concurrency terminus
