= California State Route 116 =

Highway in California

State Route 116

- Map of Sonoma County in western California with SR 116 highlighted in red

Route information
- Maintained by Caltrans
- Length: 46.500 mi (74.834 km) SR 116 is broken into pieces, and the length does not reflect the US 101 overlap that would be required to make the route continuous.
- Tourist routes: SR 116 between SR 1 and the Sebastopol city limit

Major junctions
- West end: SR 1 near Jenner
- SR 12 in Sebastopol; US 101 from Cotati to Petaluma
- East end: SR 121 near Sonoma

Location
- Country: United States
- State: California
- Counties: Sonoma

Highway system
- State highways in California; Interstate; US; State; Scenic; History; Pre‑1964; Unconstructed; Deleted; Freeways
← SR 115	→ SR 118

State Route 116 (SR 116) is a state highway in the U.S. state of California in Sonoma County. The route runs from SR 1 on the Pacific coast near Jenner to SR 121 south of Sonoma.

== Route description ==
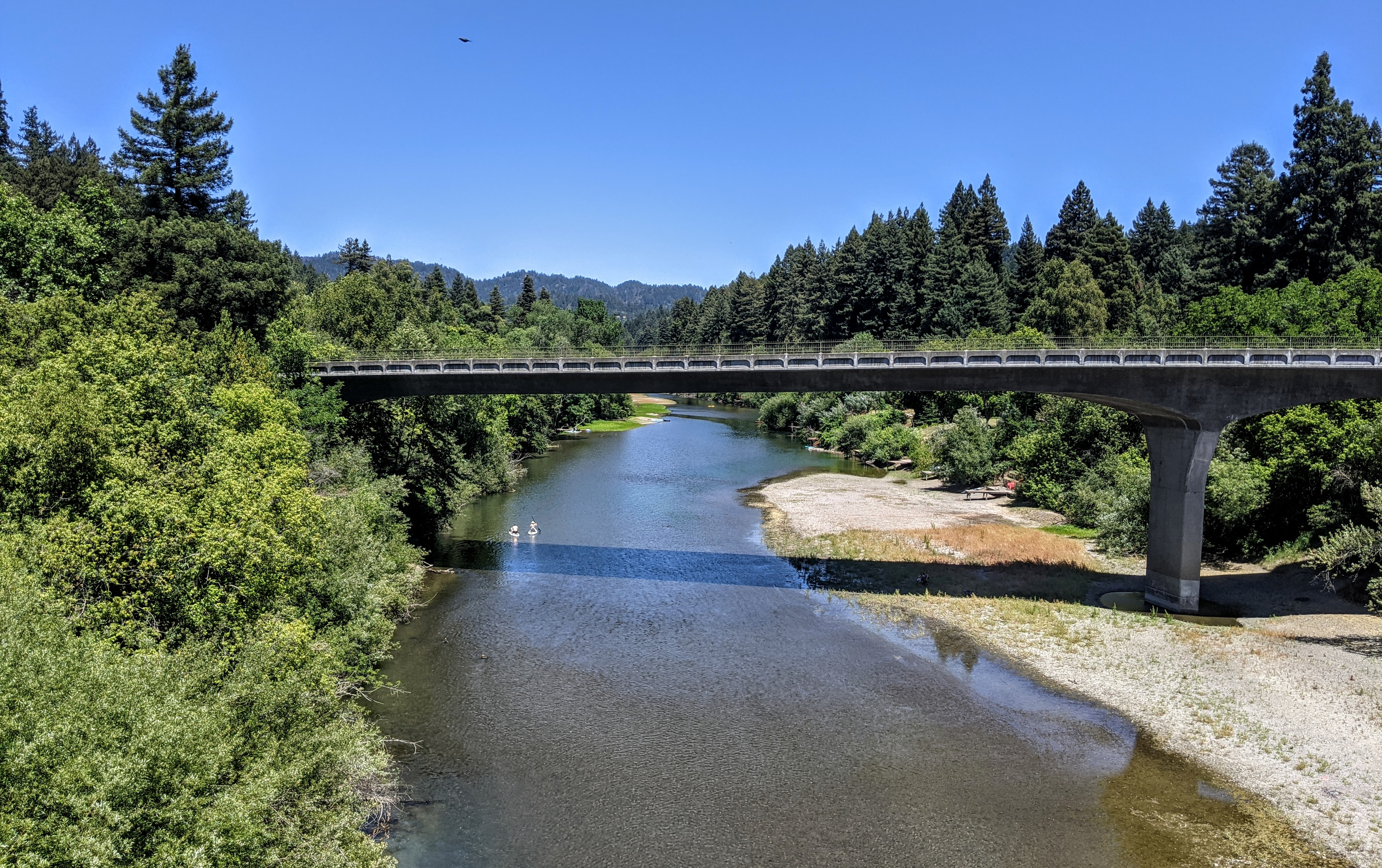
The California route 116 bridge over the Russian River at Guerneville, viewed from the historic Guerneville Bridge

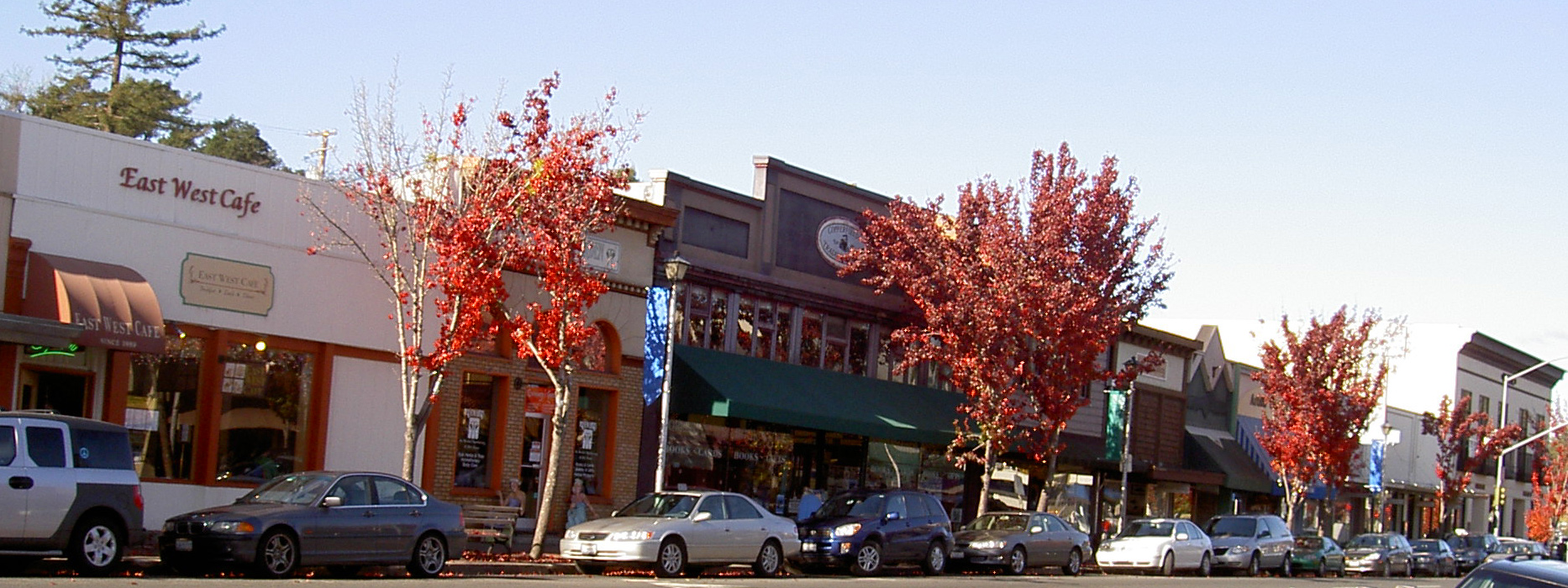
Southbound State Route 116 in downtown Sebastopol

Route 116 is defined in section 416 of the California Streets and Highways Code. The definition omits the concurrency with Route 101 instead of duplicating that segment in the other route's definition in the code:

Route 116 is from:
(a) Route 1 near Jenner to Route 101 near Cotati.
(b) Route 101 near Petaluma to Route 121 near Schellville.

SR 116 proceeds east along the north bank of the Russian River, from SR 1 to Guerneville, passing through Duncans Mills, Monte Rio, and Guernewood Park as River Road.

At the intersection of the Guerneville Bridge, the route turns southeast and passes through Forestville. River Road continues eastward as a country road towards Fulton and Santa Rosa. The section of SR 116 connecting Guerneville and Forestville is known as Pocket Canyon Road, named for the canyon it passes through. The four east-west blocks of Forestville through which 116 passes are called Front Street, but the route veers south again towards Graton and Sebastopol. Here it is called Gravenstein Highway North until the intersection with Covert Street in Sebastopol. There it undergoes another name change: Healdsburg Avenue. But it doesn't last long—heading south (right turn), it becomes North Main Street for two blocks where it intersects Bodega Highway SR 12), whereupon it becomes South Main Street. When the one-way street becomes a two-way street again, 116 is known as Gravenstein Highway South all the way to Cotati where it runs concurrently with U.S. Route 101 (US 101) as the Redwood Highway south to Petaluma. In Petaluma, Lakeville Highway takes SR 116 to Stage Gulch Road, which makes a left turn east toward Sonoma, crossing the Sonoma Mountains directly north of Tolay Lake and descending into the Sonoma Valley. In Sonoma, SR 116 runs along Arnold Drive to its terminus at SR 121 near Schellville.

SR 116 is part of the California Freeway and Expressway System, and a portion just west of US 101 is part of the National Highway System, a network of highways that are considered essential to the country's economy, defense, and mobility by the Federal Highway Administration. SR 116 is eligible to be included in the State Scenic Highway System,; however, it is only a scenic highway as designated by Caltrans from SR 1 to the Sebastopol city limit, meaning that it is a substantial section of highway passing through a "memorable landscape" with no "visual intrusions", where the potential designation has gained popular favor with the community.

== Major intersections ==
Except where prefixed with a letter, postmiles were measured on the road as it was in 1964, based on the alignment that existed at the time, and do not necessarily reflect current mileage. Postmile prefixes include: R reflecting a realignment in the route since then, M indicating a second realignment, L referring to an overlap due to a correction or change, and T indicating postmiles classified as temporary. Segments that remain unconstructed or have been relinquished to local control may be omitted. The entire route is in Sonoma County.

Location	Postmile	Exit	Destinations	Notes
	0.00		SR 1 – Bodega Bay, Jenner, Fort Bragg	West end of SR 116
	21.80		Guerneville Road – Santa Rosa	
Sebastopol	R26.73– R26.82		SR 12 east (Sebastopol Avenue) / Bodega Avenue – Santa Rosa	Western terminus of SR 12
Cotati	35.03 12.69 (Note: Indicates that the postmile represents the distance along US 101 rather than SR 116.)		US 101 north (Redwood Highway) / Gravenstein Highway – Eureka, Downtown Cotati, Rohnert Park	Interchange; west end of US 101 overlap; US 101 south exit 481
Cotati	35.03 12.69	West end of freeway on US 101		
Cotati	12.00	481A	West Sierra Avenue – Cotati	
	10.67	479	Railroad Avenue	
Petaluma	5.76	476	Old Redwood Highway, Petaluma Boulevard North (US 101 Bus. south) – Penngrove	
Petaluma	4.76	474	East Washington Street – Central Petaluma	
Petaluma	3.58 35.04	East end of freeway on US 101		
Petaluma	3.58 35.04		US 101 south (Redwood Highway) / Lakeville Street – San Francisco, Petaluma	Interchange; east end of US 101 overlap; US 101 north exit 472B
	39.27		Lakeville Road – Lakeville, Vallejo	
	44.84		Arnold Drive – Sonoma, Glen Ellen	
	46.75		SR 121 (Arnold Drive, Fremont Drive) / Bonneau Road – San Francisco, Napa	East end of SR 116
1.000 mi = 1.609 km; 1.000 km = 0.621 mi: Concurrency terminus
