= San Pablo Bay National Wildlife Refuge =

Protected area in California, United States

- IUCN category IV (habitat/species management area)
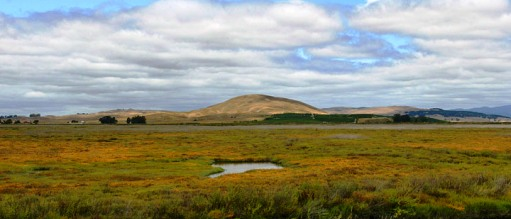

- Location within California Location within the United States
- Location: Napa County, Solano County, Sonoma County, California, United States
- Nearest city: Vallejo, California
- Coordinates: 38°08′30″N 122°24′04″W
- Area: 13,190 acres (53.4 km^{2})
- Established: 1970
- Governing body: U.S. Fish and Wildlife Service
- Website: San Pablo Bay National Wildlife Refuge

San Pablo Bay National Wildlife Refuge is a 13,190-acre (53.4 km^{2}) National Wildlife Refuge in California established in 1970. It extends along the northern shore of San Pablo Bay, from the mouth of the Petaluma River, to Tolay Creek, Sonoma Creek, and ending at Mare Island.

== Ecology ==
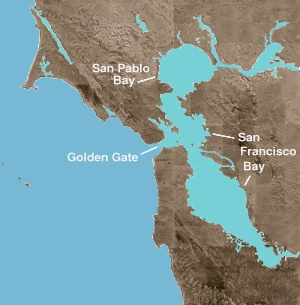
San Pablo Bay, shown with San Francisco Bay

The refuge encompasses the largest remaining continuous patch of pickleweed-dominated tidal marsh in the northern San Francisco Bay.

Historically, the wetlands surrounding San Pablo Bay were one of the largest tidal marsh complexes on the Pacific Coast of North America. However, the area has been significantly impacted by human activities such as hydraulic mining, salt production, diking, draining, filling, agriculture, and development. All told, about 85% of San Pablo Bay's tidal marshes have been altered. In fact, damaged portions these marsh areas and along the Petaluma River were considered as sites for artificial marsh creation using dredged materials. This effort was part of a US Army Corps of Engineers, Waterways Experiment Station study conducted by a Consultant from CZRC, Wilmington, NC, Dr. John C. Nemeth in the mid-1970s.

The Refuge includes a variety of habitats including open water, mud flat, tidal marsh, estuary, and seasonal and managed wetlands.

The refuge hosts millions of migratory shorebirds and waterfowl, including the largest wintering population of Canvasbacks on the west coast. The Refuge also provides year-round habitat for sensitive species including the endangered Ridgway's Rail and salt marsh harvest mouse. Public access to the refuge is provided by the Tolay Creek Tubbs Island Trail.
