= Carmet =

Carmet may refer to:

- Jean Carmet (1920–1995), French actor
- Carmet, California, census-designated place
