= Timber Cove, California =

Timber Cove
- census-designated place
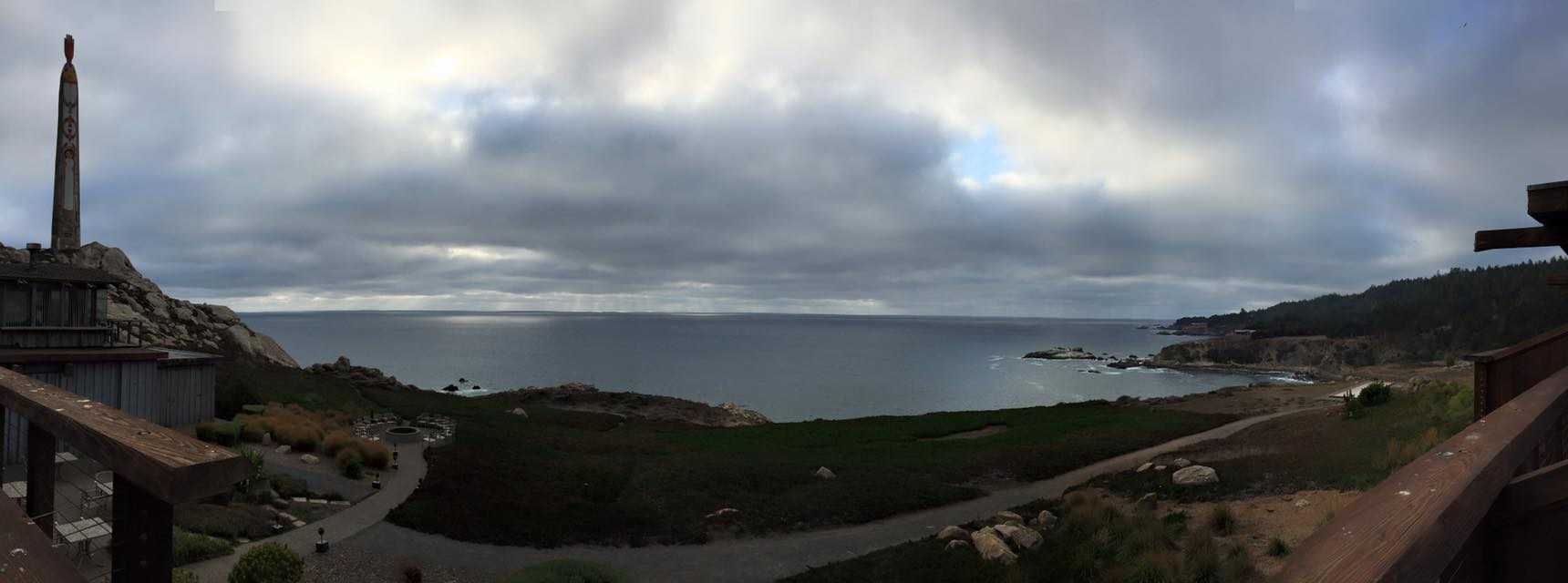

- Location in Sonoma County and the state of California

- Location in the United States
- Coordinates: 38°31′44″N 123°15′55″W
- Country: United States
- State: California
- County: Sonoma

Area
  - Total: 5.651 sq mi (14.637 km^{2})
  - Land: 5.651 sq mi (14.637 km^{2})
  - Water: 0 sq mi (0 km^{2}) 0%
- Elevation: 554 ft (169 m)

Population (2020)
  - Total: 171
  - Density: 30.3/sq mi (11.7/km^{2})
- Time zone: UTC-08:00 (PST)
  - Summer (DST): UTC-07:00 (PDT)
- GNIS feature ID: 2583163

Timber Cove is a census-designated place (CDP) in Sonoma County, California, United States. Timber Cove sits at an elevation of 554 feet (169 m). The 2020 United States census reported Timber Cove's population was 171.

== Geography ==
According to the United States Census Bureau, the CDP covers an area of 5.7 square miles (14.6 km^{2}), all land.

== Demographics ==
Historical population
Census	Pop.	Note	%±
2010	164		—
2020	171		4.3%
U.S. Decennial Census; 1860–1870 1880-1890; 1900 1910 1920; 1930 1940 1950; 1960 1970 1980; 1990 2000 2010; 2020

Timber Cove first appeared as a census designated place in the 2010 U.S. census.

=== Racial and ethnic composition ===
Timber Cove CDP, California – Racial and ethnic composition Note: the US Census treats Hispanic/Latino as an ethnic category. This table excludes Latinos from the racial categories and assigns them to a separate category. Hispanics/Latinos may be of any race.
Race / Ethnicity (NH = Non-Hispanic)	Pop 2010	Pop 2020	% 2010	% 2020
White alone (NH)	143	117	87.20%	68.42%
Black or African American alone (NH)	1	1	0.61%	0.58%
Native American or Alaska Native alone (NH)	1	4	0.61%	2.34%
Asian alone (NH)	6	0	3.66%	0.00%
Native Hawaiian or Pacific Islander alone (NH)	0	2	0.00%	1.17%
Other race alone (NH)	0	6	0.00%	3.51%
Mixed race or Multiracial (NH)	4	11	2.44%	6.43%
Hispanic or Latino (any race)	9	30	5.49%	17.54%
Total	164	171	100.00%	100.00%

=== 2020 census ===
The 2020 United States census reported that Timber Cove had a population of 171. The population density was 30.3 inhabitants per square mile (11.7/km^{2}). The racial makeup of Timber Cove was 120 (70.2%) White, 1 (0.6%) African American, 5 (2.9%) Native American, 2 (1.2%) Asian, 2 (1.2%) Pacific Islander, 17 (9.9%) from other races, and 24 (14.0%) from two or more races. Hispanic or Latino of any race were 30 persons (17.5%).

The whole population lived in households. There were 86 households, out of which 12 (14.0%) had children under the age of 18 living in them, 33 (38.4%) were married-couple households, 6 (7.0%) were cohabiting couple households, 18 (20.9%) had a female householder with no partner present, and 29 (33.7%) had a male householder with no partner present. 34 households (39.5%) were one person, and 19 (22.1%) were one person aged 65 or older. The average household size was 1.99. There were 42 families (48.8% of all households).

The age distribution was 18 people (10.5%) under the age of 18, 15 people (8.8%) aged 18 to 24, 36 people (21.1%) aged 25 to 44, 40 people (23.4%) aged 45 to 64, and 62 people (36.3%) who were 65 years of age or older. The median age was 56.1 years. There were 83 males and 88 females.

There were 169 housing units at an average density of 29.9 units per square mile (11.5 units/km^{2}), of which 86 (50.9%) were occupied. Of these, 66 (76.7%) were owner-occupied, and 20 (23.3%) were occupied by renters.

== Modern history ==
Timber Cove was first settled by non-indigenous people in about 1856. It was one of many "dog hole ports" on California's "Redwood Coast," where lumber was sent down from the top of a bluff via a chute to load schooners anchored in a small harbor. The town was heavily engaged in the lumber industry from that time until about 1925 when ranching and dairy farming became the major local industry.

== Notable sight ==
A 93-foot statue by San Francisco-based Italian-American sculptor Beniamino Bufano, alternatively known as Bufano's Peace Obelisk, Madonna of Peace, or The Expanding Universe, stands on a bluff overlooking the Pacific, within the grounds of the Timber Cove Resort. The statue later became the focal point of a tiny state park that extends in a 60-foot radius from it. It was built between 1962 and 1970.

== Education ==
The school districts are Fort Ross Elementary School District and West Sonoma County Union High School District.
