= Sereno del Mar, California =

Sereno del Mar
- census-designated place

- Position in California.
- Coordinates: 38°23′01″N 123°04′23″W
- Country: United States
- State: California
- County: Sonoma

Area
  - Total: 0.737 sq mi (1.910 km^{2})
  - Land: 0.737 sq mi (1.910 km^{2})
  - Water: 0 sq mi (0 km^{2}) 0%
- Elevation: 190 ft (58 m)

Population (2020)
  - Total: 107
  - Density: 145/sq mi (56.0/km^{2})
- Time zone: UTC-8 (Pacific (PST))
  - Summer (DST): UTC-7 (PDT)
- GNIS feature ID: 2583134

Sereno del Mar (Spanish for "Serene of the Sea") is a census-designated place (CDP) in Sonoma County, California, United States. Sereno del Mar sits at an elevation of 190 feet (58 m). The 2020 United States census reported Sereno del Mar's population was 107.

== Geography ==
According to the United States Census Bureau, the CDP covers an area of 0.7 square mile (1.9 km^{2}), all land.

== Demographics ==
Historical population
| Census | Pop. | Note | %± |
|---|---|---|---|
| 2010 | 126 | | — |
| 2020 | 107 | | −15.1% |
U.S. Decennial Census; 1860–1870 1880-1890; 1900 1910 1920; 1930 1940 1950; 1960 1970 1980; 1990 2000 2010; 2020

Sereno del Mar first appeared as a census designated place in the 2010 U.S. census.

=== Racial and ethnic composition ===
Sereno del Mar CDP, California – Racial and ethnic composition Note: the US Census treats Hispanic/Latino as an ethnic category. This table excludes Latinos from the racial categories and assigns them to a separate category. Hispanics/Latinos may be of any race.
| Race / Ethnicity (NH = Non-Hispanic) | Pop 2010 | Pop 2020 | % 2010 | % 2020 |
|---|---|---|---|---|
| White alone (NH) | 113 | 92 | 89.68% | 85.98% |
| Black or African American alone (NH) | 1 | 1 | 0.79% | 0.93% |
| Native American or Alaska Native alone (NH) | 0 | 0 | 0.00% | 0.00% |
| Asian alone (NH) | 1 | 2 | 0.79% | 1.87% |
| Native Hawaiian or Pacific Islander alone (NH) | 0 | 0 | 0.00% | 0.00% |
| Other race alone (NH) | 2 | 1 | 1.59% | 0.93% |
| Mixed race or Multiracial (NH) | 1 | 4 | 0.79% | 3.74% |
| Hispanic or Latino (any race) | 8 | 7 | 6.35% | 6.54% |
| Total | 126 | 107 | 100.00% | 100.00% |

=== 2020 census ===
The 2020 United States census reported that Sereno del Mar had a population of 107. The population density was 145.2 inhabitants per square mile (56.1/km^{2}). The racial makeup of Sereno del Mar was 92 (86.0%) White, 1 (0.9%) African American, 0 (0.0%) Native American, 2 (1.9%) Asian, 0 (0.0%) Pacific Islander, 1 (0.9%) from other races, and 11 (10.3%) from two or more races. Hispanic or Latino of any race were 7 persons (6.5%).

The whole population lived in households. There were 55 households, out of which 5 (9.1%) had children under the age of 18 living in them, 33 (60.0%) were married-couple households, 3 (5.5%) were cohabiting couple households, 14 (25.5%) had a female householder with no partner present, and 5 (9.1%) had a male householder with no partner present. 10 households (18.2%) were one person, and 4 (7.3%) were one person aged 65 or older. The average household size was 1.95. There were 40 families (72.7% of all households).

The age distribution was 5 people (4.7%) under the age of 18, 10 people (9.3%) aged 18 to 24, 12 people (11.2%) aged 25 to 44, 41 people (38.3%) aged 45 to 64, and 39 people (36.4%) who were 65 years of age or older. The median age was 55.9 years. There were 48 males and 59 females.

There were 129 housing units at an average density of 175.0 units per square mile (67.6 units/km^{2}), of which 55 (42.6%) were occupied. Of these, 43 (78.2%) were owner-occupied, and 12 (21.8%) were occupied by renters.

== Education ==
It is in the Shoreline Unified School District.
