= Sonoma County, California =

County in California, United States

Sonoma County
- County
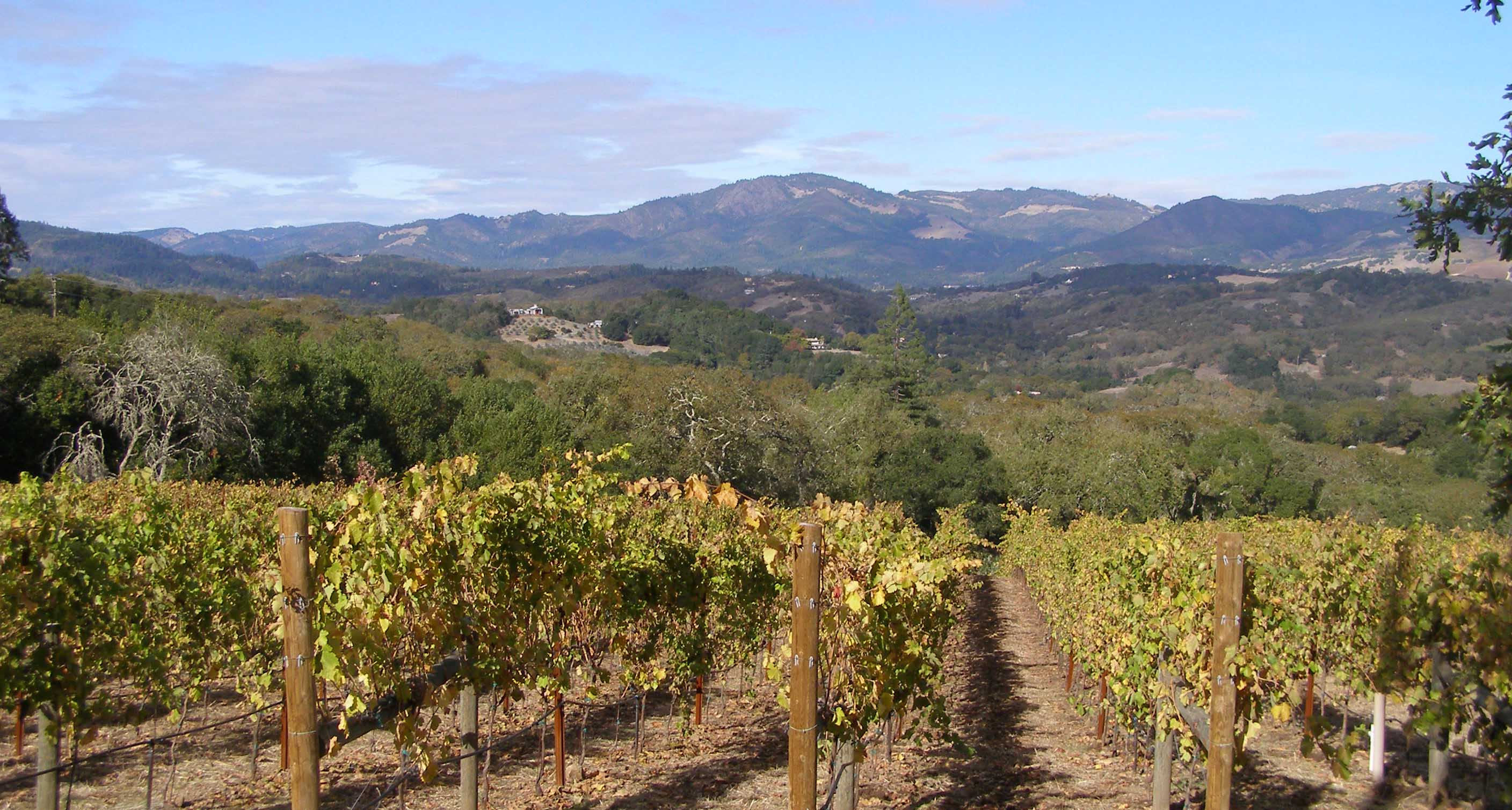
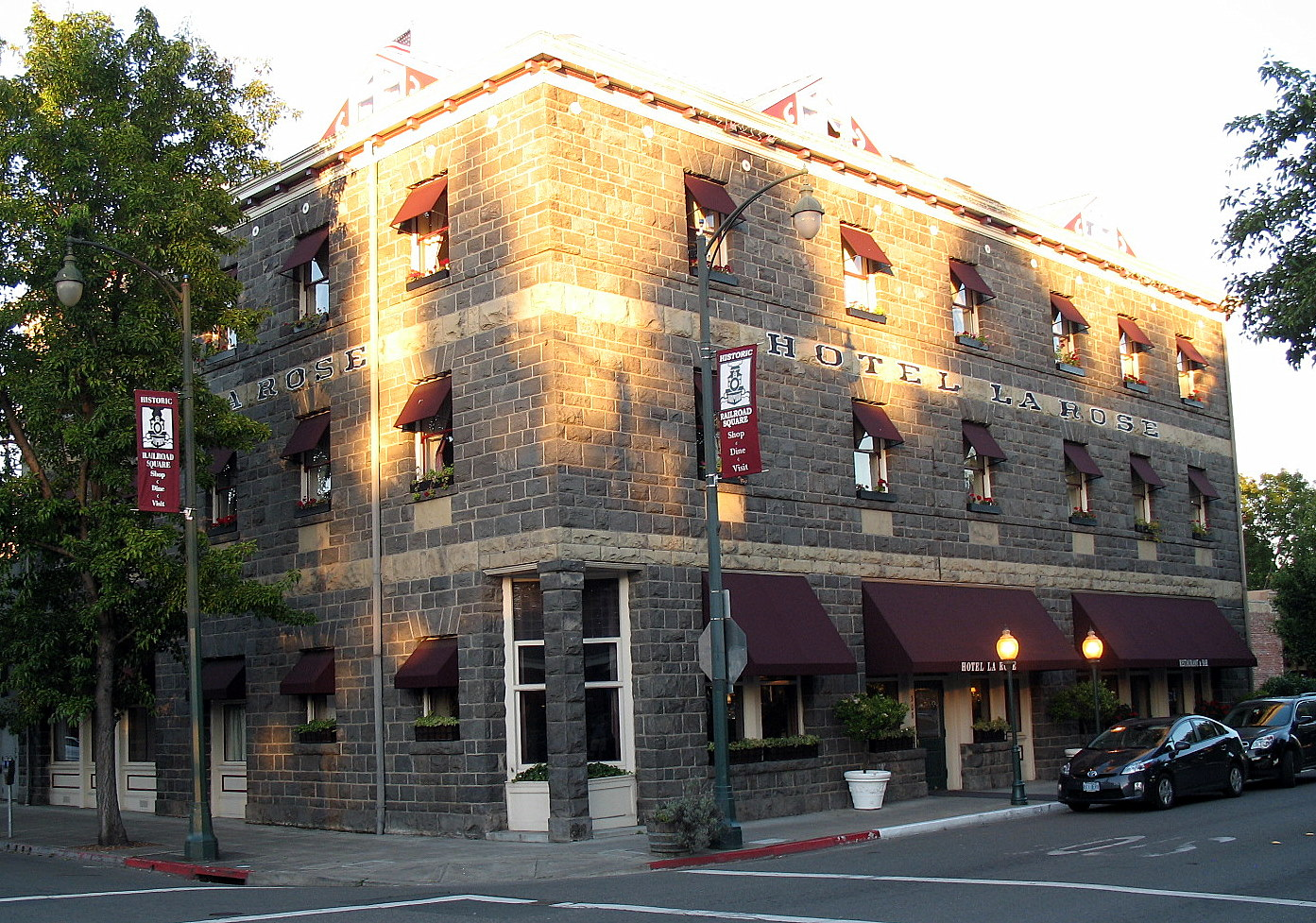
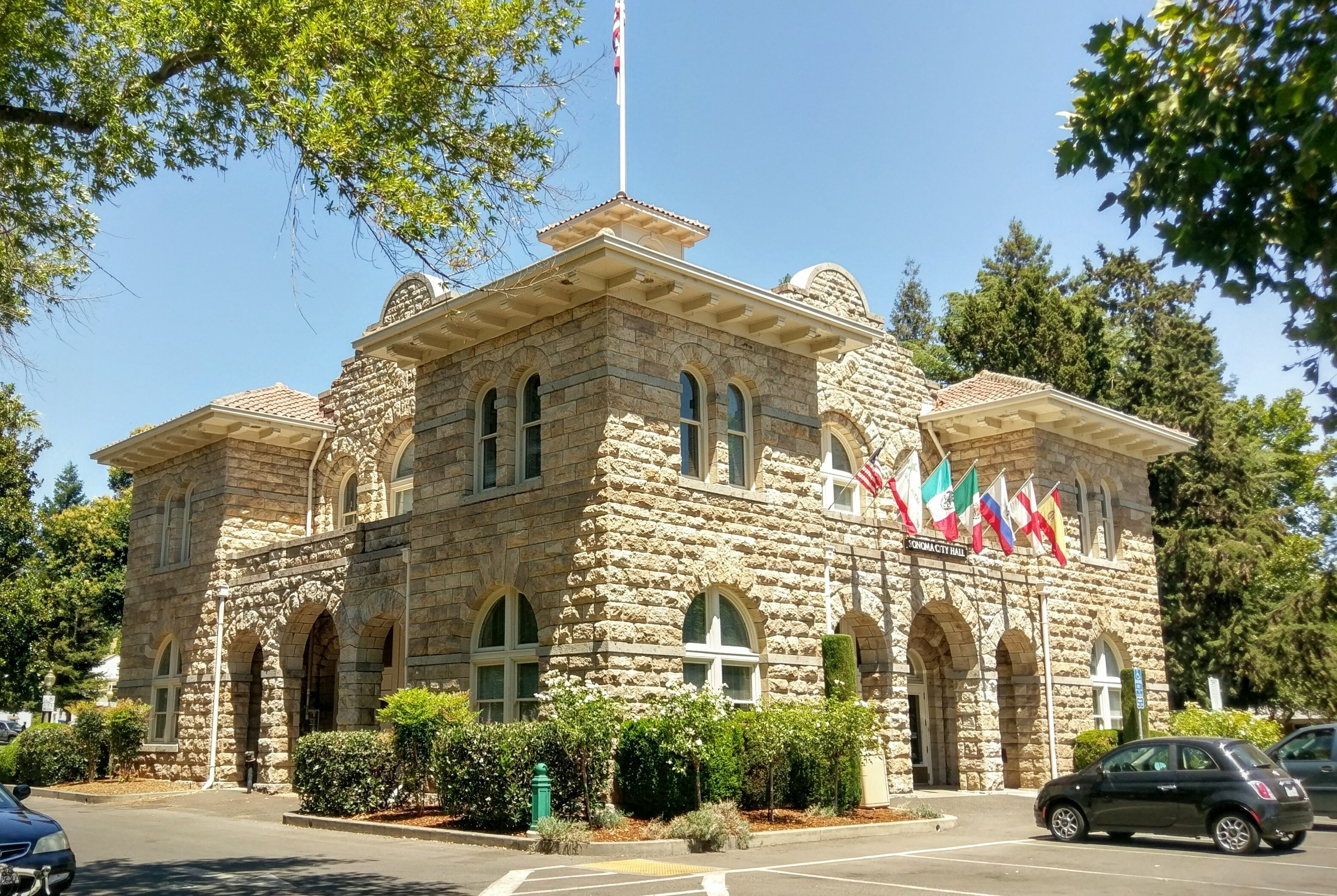
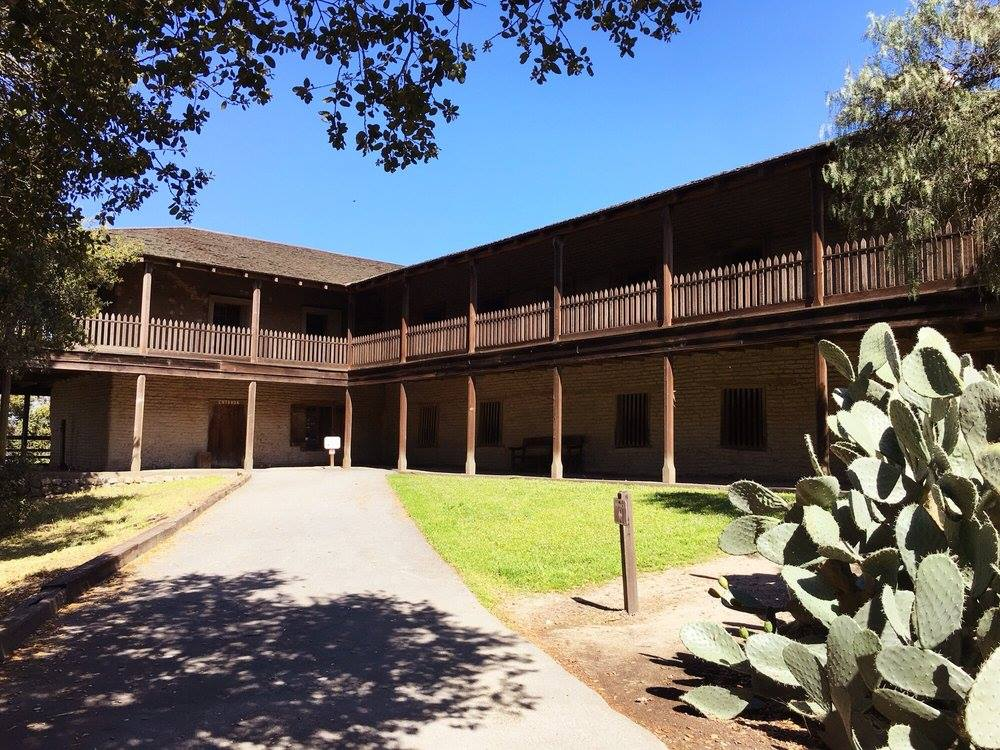
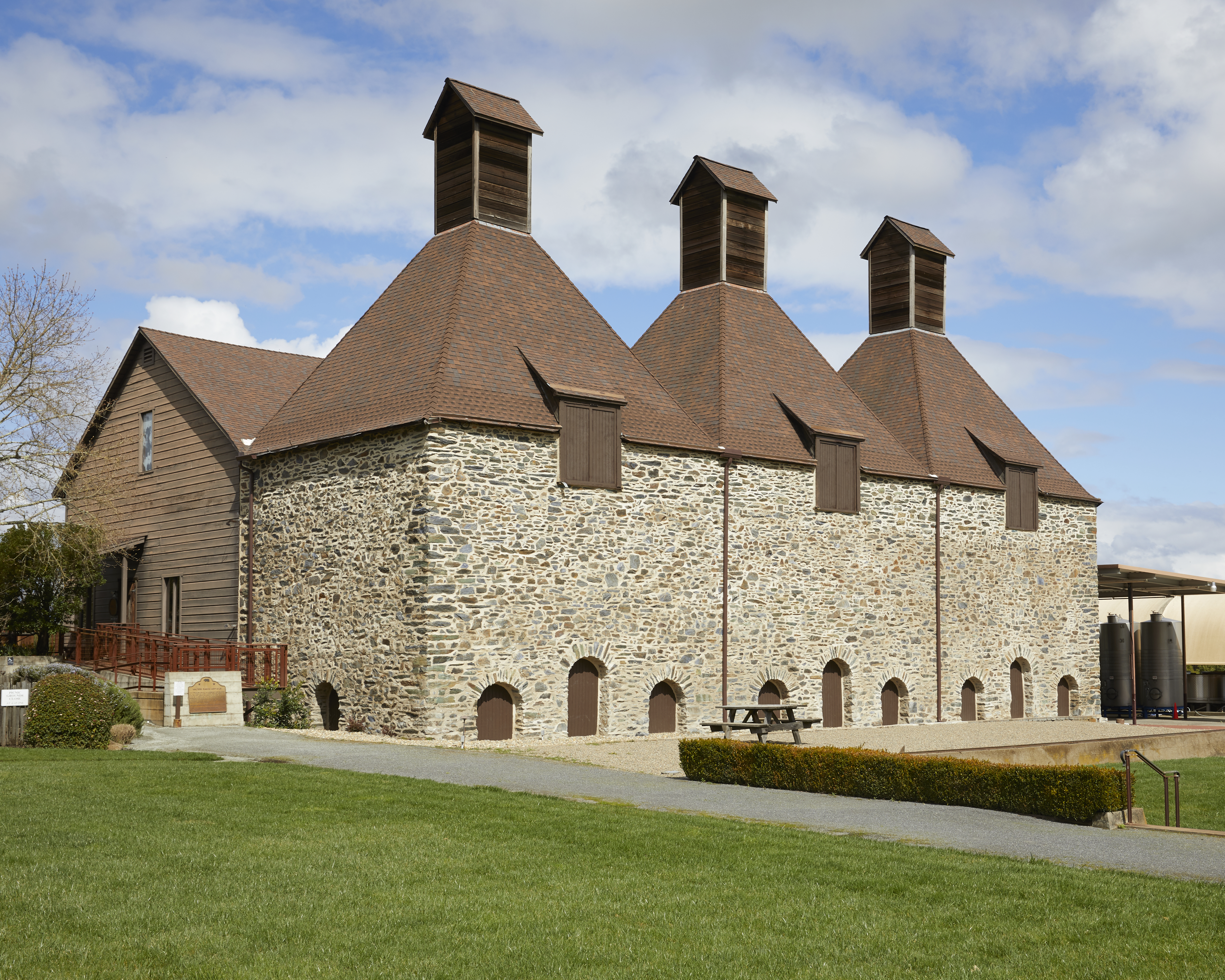
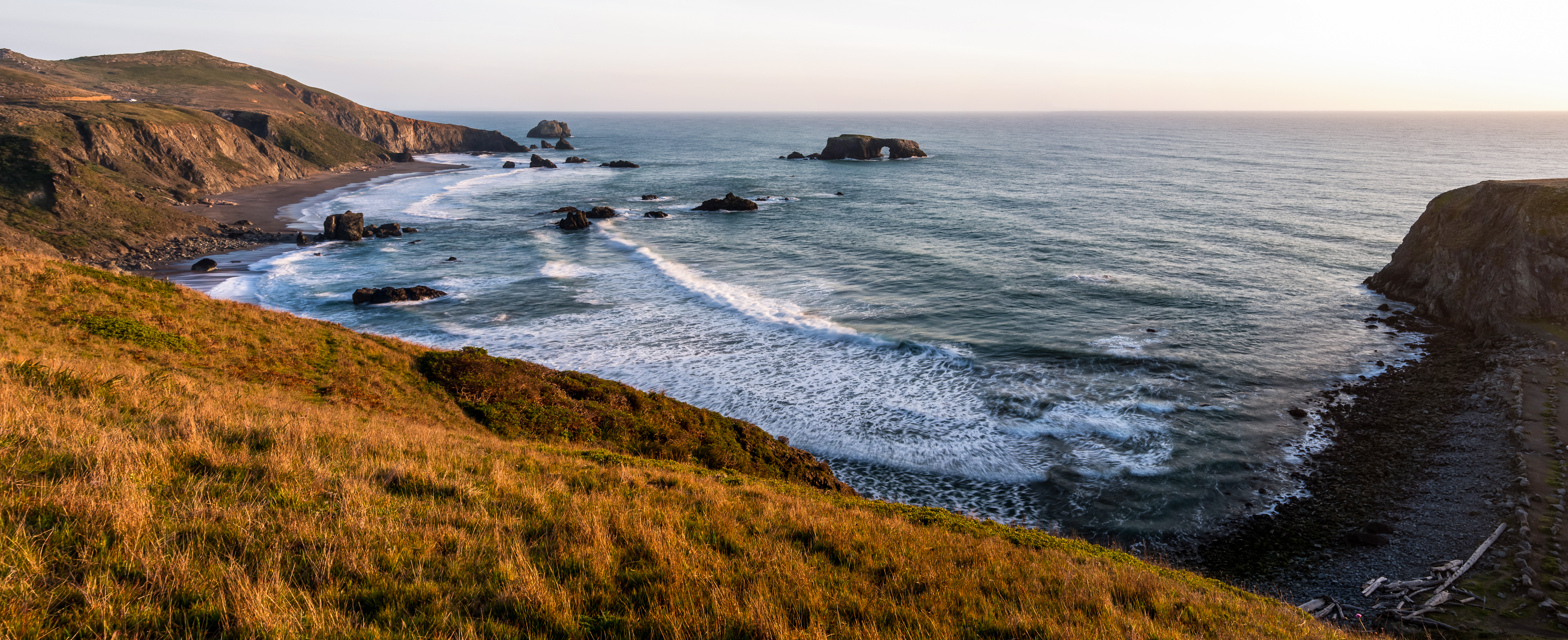
- Wine Country and the Mayacamas Mountains Santa Rosa Sonoma Petaluma Healdsburg Sonoma Coast near Sereno del Mar

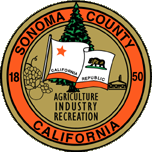
- Seal
- Motto: "Agriculture, Industry, Recreation"
- Interactive map of Sonoma County
- Location in the state of California
- Coordinates: 38.51°N 122.93°W
- Country: United States
- State: California
- Region: San Francisco Bay Area
- Incorporated: February 18, 1850
- Named for: the city of Sonoma
- County seat (and largest city): Santa Rosa

Government
  - Type: Council–Administrator
  - Body: Sonoma County Board of Supervisors
  - Chair: Rebecca Hermosillo
  - Vice Chair: Chris Coursey
  - Chair Pro Tem: David Rabbitt
  - Board of Supervisors: Supervisors: Rebecca Hermosillo; David Rabbitt; Chris Coursey; James Gore; Lynda Hopkins
  - County Executive: M. Christina Rivera

Area
  - Total: 1,768 sq mi (4,580 km^{2})
  - Land: 1,576 sq mi (4,080 km^{2})
  - Water: 192 sq mi (500 km^{2}) 10.9%
- Highest elevation: 4,483 ft (1,366 m)

Population (2020)
  - Total: 488,863
  - Estimate (2025): 486,444 ▼
  - Density: 310.2/sq mi (119.8/km^{2})

GDP
  - Total: $36.877 billion (2022)
- Time zone: UTC−8 (Pacific Time Zone)
  - Summer (DST): UTC−7 (Pacific Daylight Time)
- Area code: 707, 369
- FIPS code: 06-097
- GNIS feature ID: 1657246
- Congressional districts: 2nd, 4th
- Website: sonomacounty.gov

Sonoma County (/səˈnoʊmə/ sə-NOH-mə) is a northern county in the U.S. state of California. As of the 2020 United States census, its population was 488,863. The county seat and the largest city in the county is Santa Rosa.

Sonoma County comprises the Santa Rosa–Petaluma metropolitan statistical area, which was part of the San Jose–San Francisco–Oakland, CA combined statistical area until 2023. It is the northernmost county in the nine-county San Francisco Bay Area region.

In California's Wine Country region, which also includes Napa, Mendocino, and Lake counties, Sonoma County is the largest producer. It has nineteen approved American Viticultural Areas and more than 350 wineries. The voters have twice approved open space initiatives that have provided funding for public acquisition of natural areas, preserving forested areas, coastal habitat, and other open space. More than 8.4 million tourists visit each year, spending more than $1 billion in 2016.

Sonoma County is a leading producer of hops, grapes, prunes, and apples, as well as dairy and poultry products, largely due to the extent of available, fertile agricultural land in addition to the abundance of high-quality water for irrigation. Agriculture is largely divided between two nearly monocultural uses: grapes and pasturage.

== History ==
Scientific studies of rock formations at Wilson Grove in Sonoma County had begun by 1952, and eventually by 1988 provided evidence that around 4 million years ago, there was a shallow sea covering Sonoma County, which was named as the Wilson Grove Sea, distinct from the Merced Sea covering San Francisco during that time. Wilson Grove (named after Walter Wilson) is located near California's Russian River, west of Windsor, California, and from the 1920s onwards has been used for camps and outings. By 1922, fossils had been discovered and analyzed in Wilson Grove, which up to the 1970s was considered as part of the Merced Formation. Sonoma County was identified in 1983 as belonging to the Wilson Grove Formation, deposited from the late Miocene to the late Pliocene; many fossils (including of baleen whales, walruses, sharks, birds, snails, lamp shells, clams, and barnacles) were discovered in 1973 at a quarry at Bloomfield in Sonoma County.

The Pomo, Coast Miwok and Wappo peoples were the earliest human settlers of Sonoma County, between 8000 and 5000 BC, effectively living within the natural carrying capacity of the land. Archaeological evidence of these First people includes a number of occurrences of rock carvings, especially in southern Sonoma County; these carvings often take the form of pecked curvilinear nucleated design.

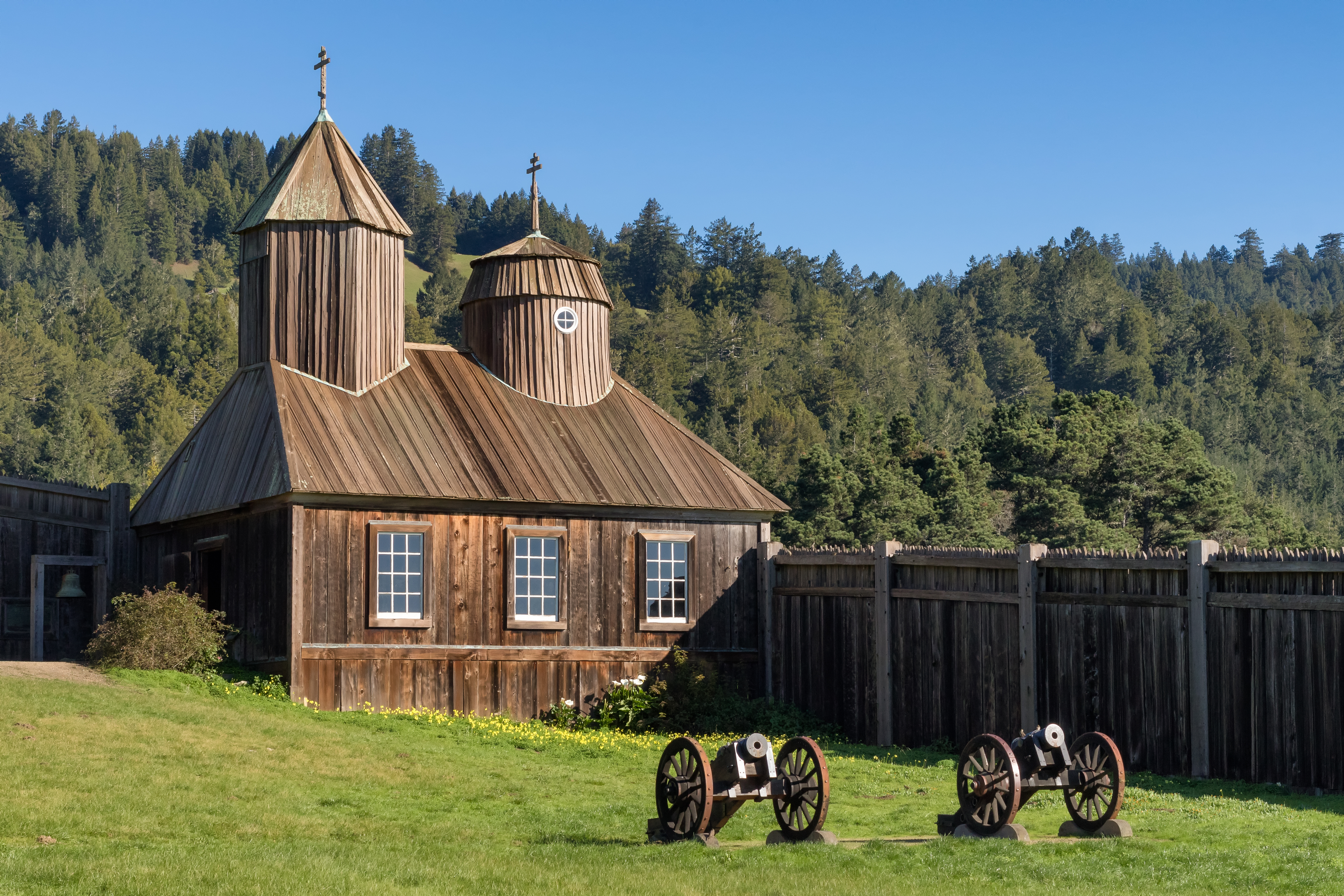
Fort Ross was established by the Russians in 1812.

Spaniards, Russians, and other Europeans claimed and settled in the county from the late 16th to mid-19th century, seeking timber, fur, and farmland. The Russians were the first newcomers to establish a permanent foothold in Sonoma County, with the Russian-American Company establishing Fort Ross on the Sonoma Coast in 1812. This settlement and its outlying Russian settlements came to include a population of several hundred Russian and Aleut settlers and a stockaded fort with artillery. However, the Russians abandoned it in 1841 and sold the fort to John Sutter, settler and Mexican land grantee of Sacramento.

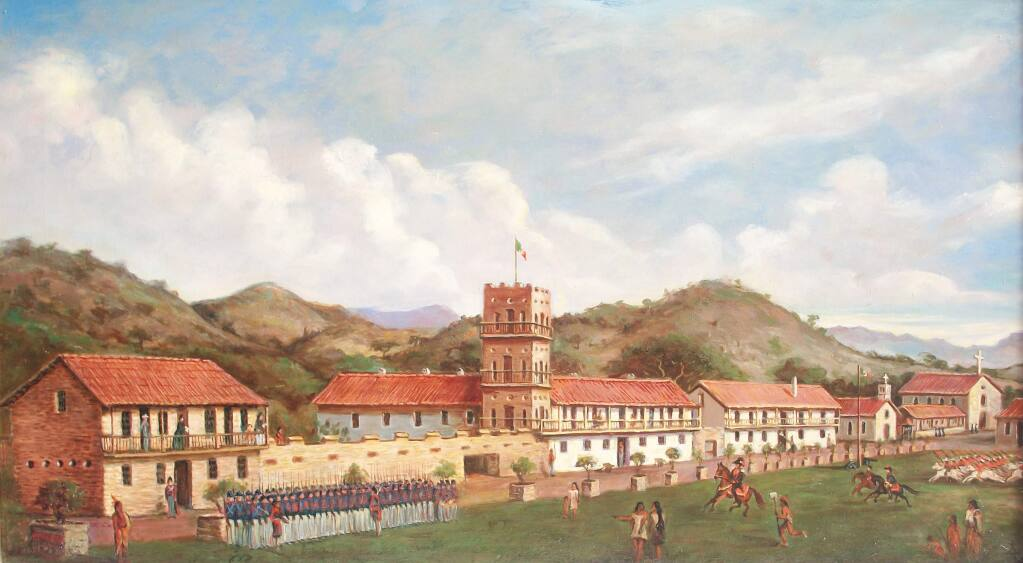
General Mariano Guadalupe Vallejo reviewing his troops in Sonoma, 1846

The Mission San Francisco Solano, founded in 1823 as the last and northernmost of 21 California missions, is in the present City of Sonoma, at the northern end of El Camino Real. El Presidio de Sonoma, or Sonoma Barracks (part of Spain's Fourth Military District), was established in 1836 by Comandante General Mariano Guadalupe Vallejo. His duties included keeping an eye on the Russian traders at Fort Ross, secularizing the Mission, maintaining cooperation with the Native Americans of the entire region, and doling out the lands for large estates and ranches. The City of Sonoma was the site of the Bear Flag Revolt in 1846.

Sonoma was one of the original counties when California became a state in 1850, with its county seat originally the town (now city) of Sonoma. However, by the early 1850s, Sonoma had declined in importance in both commerce and population, its county buildings were crumbling, and it was relatively remote. As a result, elements in the newer, rapidly growing towns of Petaluma, Santa Rosa, and Healdsburg began vying to move the county seat to their towns. The dispute ultimately was between the bigger, richer commercial town of Petaluma and the more centrally located, growing agricultural center of Santa Rosa. The fate was decided following an election for the state legislature in which James Bennett of Santa Rosa defeated Joseph Hooker of Sonoma and introduced a bill that resulted in Santa Rosa being confirmed as county seat in 1854. Allegedly, several Santa Rosans, not caring to wait, decided to take action and, one night, rode down the Sonoma Valley to Sonoma, took the county seals and records, and brought them to Santa Rosa. Some of the county's land was annexed from Mendocino County between 1850 and 1860.

Early post-1847 settlement and development focused primarily on the city of Sonoma, then the region's sole town and a common transit and resting point in overland travel between the region and Sacramento and the gold fields to the east. However, after 1850, a settlement that soon became the city of Petaluma began to grow naturally near the farthest navigable point inland up the Petaluma River. Originally a hunting camp used to obtain game to sell in other markets, by 1854 Petaluma had grown into a bustling center of trade, taking advantage of its position on the river near a region of highly productive agricultural land that was being settled. Soon, other inland towns, notably Santa Rosa and Healdsburg began to develop similarly due to their locations along riparian areas in prime agricultural flatland. However, their development initially lagged behind Petaluma which, until the arrival of railroads in the 1860s, remained the primary commercial, transit, and break-of-bulk point for people and goods in the region. After the arrival of the San Francisco and North Pacific Railroad in 1870, Santa Rosa began to boom, soon equalling and then surpassing Petaluma as the region's population and commercial center. The railroad bypassed Petaluma for southern connections to ferries of San Francisco Bay.

Six nations have claimed Sonoma County from 1542 to the present:

New Spain	Spanish Empire, 1542, by sea, voyage of Juan Rodríguez Cabrillo as far as the Russian River. Later validated by voyage of Sebastián Vizcaíno, 1602.
	Kingdom of England, June 1579, voyage of the Golden Hind under Captain Francis Drake at Bodega Bay (exact location disputed).
	Spanish Empire, October 1775, the Sonora at Bodega Bay, under Lt. Juan Francisco de la Bodega y Quadra, until 1821, when Mexico gained independence from Spain.
Russia	Russian Empire, by Russian-American Company expedition led by Ivan Alexandrovich Kuskov, the founder of Fort Ross and, from 1812 to 1821, its colonial administrator. Note: There is an overlap of rule with the Mexican Empire (next item), until the Russians sold Fort Ross in 1841 to John Sutter, before leaving the area in 1842.
Mexico	First Mexican Empire, August 1821, under Emperor Agustin Iturbide (October 1822, probable time new flag raised in California), until 1823.
Mexico	Mexican Republic, 1823 until June 1846.
	California Republic, June 14, 1846, until July 9, 1846.
	United States of America, July 9, 1846 to present.

Sonoma County was severely shaken by the 1906 San Francisco earthquake. The displacements along the fault averaged 15 feet (4.6 m).

In October 2017, the county was greatly affected by the Tubbs Fire and the Nuns Fire. In late October and early November 2019, the Kincade Fire burned 77,758 acres (31,468 ha), almost all in Sonoma County. In August and September 2020, the Walbridge Fire burned 55,209 acres (22,342 ha) in the western part of the county; then in September–October the Glass fire affected the city of Santa Rosa and ultimately destroying 1,000+ buildings The county also had a wildfire in the 1870s that is compared to the Hanley fire and Tubbs fire because they burned in the same path.

The Sonoma County Landmarks Commission recognizes nearly 200 formal historical landmarks and the Sonoma County Historical Society counts 380 landmarks recognized by several agencies.

== Etymology ==
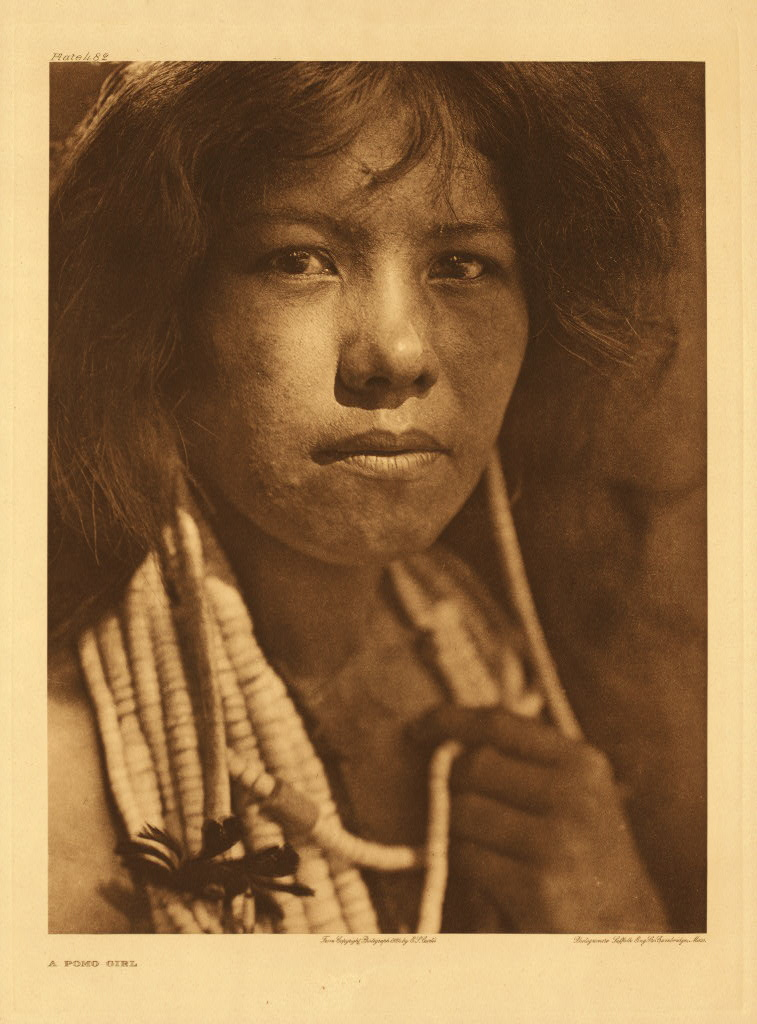
Pomo girl c. 1924, by Edward S. Curtis from The North American Indian volume 14

According to the book California Place Names, "The name of the Indian tribe is mentioned in baptismal records of 1815 as Chucuines or Sonomas, by Chamisso in 1816 as Sonomi, and repeatedly in Mission records of the following years."

According to the Coast Miwok and the Pomo tribes that lived in the region, Sonoma translates as "valley of the moon" or "many moons". Their legends detail this as a land where the moon nestled, hence the names Sonoma Valley and the "Valley of the Moon." This translation was first recorded in an 1850 report by General Mariano Guadalupe Vallejo to the California Legislature. Jack London popularized it in his 1913 novel The Valley of the Moon.

In the native languages there is also a constantly recurring ending tso-noma, from tso, the earth; and noma, village; hence tsonoma, "earth village." Other sources say Sonoma comes from the Patwin tribes west of the Sacramento River, and their Wintu word for "nose". Per California Place Names, "the name is doubtless derived from a Patwin word for 'nose', which Padre Arroyo (Vocabularies, p. 22) gives as sonom (Suisun)." Spaniards may have found an Indian chief with a prominent protuberance and applied the nickname of Chief Nose to the village and the territory. The name may have applied originally to a nose-shaped geographic feature.

Jesse Sawyer argues that it is from Wappo tso-noma, meaning "redwood place."

== Geography ==
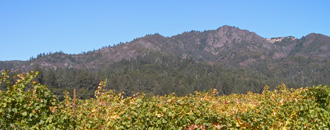
Hood Mountain with vineyards in foreground

According to the U.S. Census Bureau, the county has an area of 1,768 square miles (4,580 km^{2}), of which 1,576 square miles (4,080 km^{2}) is land and 192 square miles (500 km^{2}) (10.9%) is water.

The county lies in the North Coast Ranges of northwestern California. Its ranges include the Mayacamas and the Sonoma Mountains, the southern peak of the latter being the prominent landform Sears Point. The highest peak in the Mayacamas within the county and the highest peak in the county is Mt. Saint Helena. It has uncommon occurrences of pygmy forest, dominated by Mendocino cypress. The highest peak of the Sonoma Mountains is Sonoma Mountain itself, which boasts two significant public access properties: Jack London State Historic Park and Fairfield Osborn Preserve.

The county includes the City of Sonoma and the Sonoma Valley, in which the City of Sonoma is located. However, these are not synonymous. The City of Sonoma is merely one of nine incorporated cities in the county. The Sonoma Valley is just the southeastern portion of the county, which includes many other valleys and geographic zones, including the Petaluma Valley, the Santa Rosa Plains, the Russian River, the Alexander Valley, and the Dry Creek Valley.

Distinct habitat areas within the county include oak woodland, redwood forest, northern coastal scrub, grassland, marshland, oak savanna and riparian woodland. The California oak woodland in the upper Yulupa Creek and Spring Creek watersheds in Annadel State Park is a relatively undisturbed ecosystem with considerable biodiversity. These forested areas have been characterized as some of the best examples of such woodlands. An unusual characteristic of these forests is the high content of undisturbed prehistoric bunchgrass understory, testifying to the absence of historic grazing or other agriculture.

Trees of the oak woodland habitat include Pacific madrone, Douglas fir, coast live oak, Garry oak, and California laurel. Common understory plants are toyon, poison oak, and, at the fringes, coast silk-tassel.

=== Climate ===
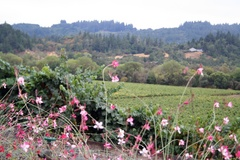
Sonoma County's Dry Creek Valley

Sonoma County, as is often the case with coastal counties in California, has a great degree of climatic variation and numerous, often very different, microclimates. Key determining factors for local climate are proximity to the ocean, elevation, and the presence and elevation of hills or mountains to the east and west. This is in large part due to the fact that, as throughout California, the prevailing weather systems and wind come normally from the Pacific Ocean, blowing in from the west and southwest, so that places closer to the ocean and on the windward side of higher elevations tend to receive more rain from autumn through spring and more summer wind and fog. This itself is partly a result of the presence of high and low pressures in inland California, with persistent high summer temperatures in the Central Valley, in particular, leading to low pressures, drawing in moist air from the Pacific, cooling into damp cool breezes and fog over the cold coastal water. Those places further inland and particularly in the lee of significant elevations tend to receive less rain and less, in some cases no, fog in the summer.

The coast itself is typically cool and moist throughout summer, often foggy, with fog generally blowing in during the late afternoon and evening until it clears in the later morning becoming sunny, before repeating. Coastal summer highs are typically in the mid to high 60s, warming to the low 70s further from the ocean.

Certain inland areas, including the Petaluma area and the Santa Rosa Plain, are also prone to this normal fog pattern in general. However, they tend to receive the fog later in the evening, the fog tends to be more short-lived, and mid-day temperatures are significantly higher than they are on the coast, typically in the low 80s F. This is particularly true for Petaluma, Cotati, and Rohnert Park, and, only slightly less so, Santa Rosa, Windsor, and Sebastopol. In large part, this results from lower elevations and the prominent Petaluma Gap in the hills between the ocean to the west and the Petaluma Valley and Santa Rosa Plain to the east.

Areas north of Santa Rosa and Windsor, with larger elevations to the west and further from the fog path, tend to receive less fog and less summer marine influence. Healdsburg, to the north of Windsor, is less foggy and much warmer, with summer highs typically in the higher 80s to about 90 °F (32 °C). Sonoma and the Sonoma Valley, east of Petaluma, are similar, with highs typically in the very high 70s F to 80 °F (27 °C). This is in part due to the presence of the Sonoma Mountains between Petaluma and Sonoma. Cloverdale, far to the north and outside of the Santa Rosa Plain, is significantly hotter than any other city in the county, with rare evening-morning fog and highs often in the 90s, reaching 100 °F (38 °C) much more frequently than the other cities. Notably, however, the temperature differences among the different areas of the county are greatest for the highs during mid-day, with the diurnal lows much more even throughout the entire county. The lows are closely tied to the evening-morning cooling marine influence, in addition to elevation, bringing similarly cool temperatures to much of region.

These weather patterns contribute to high diurnal temperature fluctuations in much of the county. In summer, daily lows and highs are typically 30–40 °F apart inland, with highs for Petaluma, Cotati, Rohnert Park, Santa Rosa, Windsor, and Sebastopol typically being in the very low 80s F and lows at or near 50 °F (10 °C). Healdsburg and the City of Sonoma, with similar lows, have even greater diurnal fluctuations due to their significantly warmer highs. On the other hand, the coast, with strong marine influence, tends to have low diurnal temperature fluctuation, with summer highs much cooler than the inland towns, typically 65–75 °F, yet lows in the high 40s to low 50s F, fairly comparable to most inland towns.

These microclimates are evident during the rainy seasons as well, with great variation in the amount of rainfall throughout the county. Generally, all of Sonoma County receives a fair amount of rain, with much of the county receiving between about 25 in (640 mm), comparable to areas such as Sonoma and Petaluma, and roughly 30 in (760 mm) normal for Santa Rosa. However, certain areas, particularly in the north-west portion of the county around the Russian River, receive significantly more rainfall. The Guerneville area, for example, typically receives about 50 in (1,300 mm) of rain a year, with annual rain occasionally going as high as 70 in (1,800 mm). Nearby Cazadero typically receives about 72 in (1,800 mm) of rain a year, many times has reached over 100 in (2,500 mm) a year, and sometimes over 120 in (3,000 mm) of rain in a year. The Cazadero region is the second wettest place in California after Gasquet.

Snow is exceedingly rare in Sonoma County, except in the higher elevations on and around the Mayacamas Mountains, particularly Mount Saint Helena, and Cobb Mountain, whose peak is in Lake County.

=== Ocean, bays, rivers and streams ===
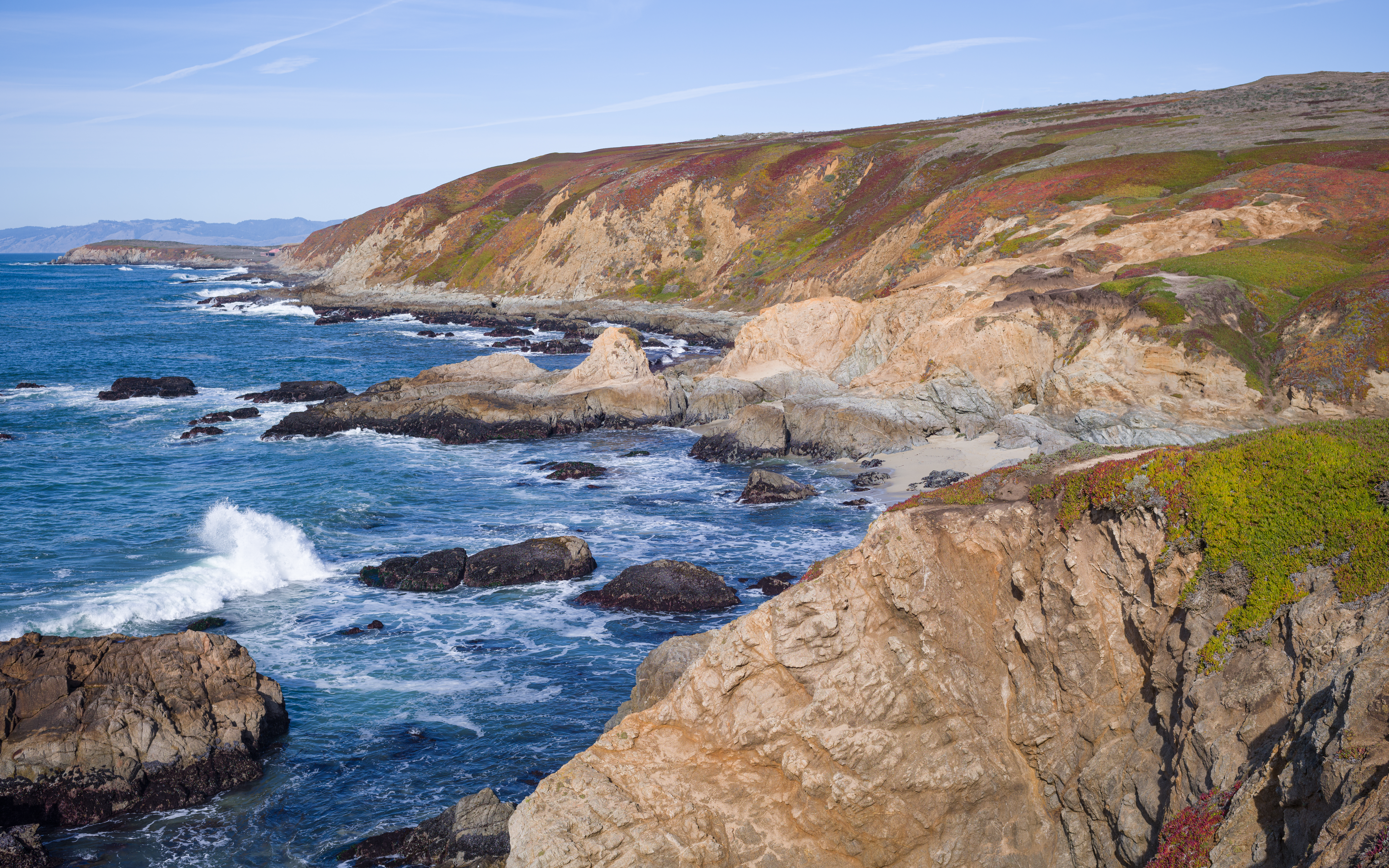
Typical Sonoma County coastline as seen from Bodega Head

Sonoma County is bounded on the west by the Pacific Ocean, and has 76 miles (122 km) of coastline. The major coastal hydrographic features are Bodega Bay, the mouth of the Russian River, and the mouth of the Gualala River, at the border with Mendocino County. All of the county's beaches were listed as among the cleanest in the state in 2010.

Six of the county's nine cities, from Healdsburg south through Santa Rosa to Rohnert Park and Cotati, are in the Santa Rosa Plain. The northern Plain drains directly to the Russian River, or to a tributary; the southern Plain drains to the Russian River via the Laguna de Santa Rosa.

==== Russian River ====
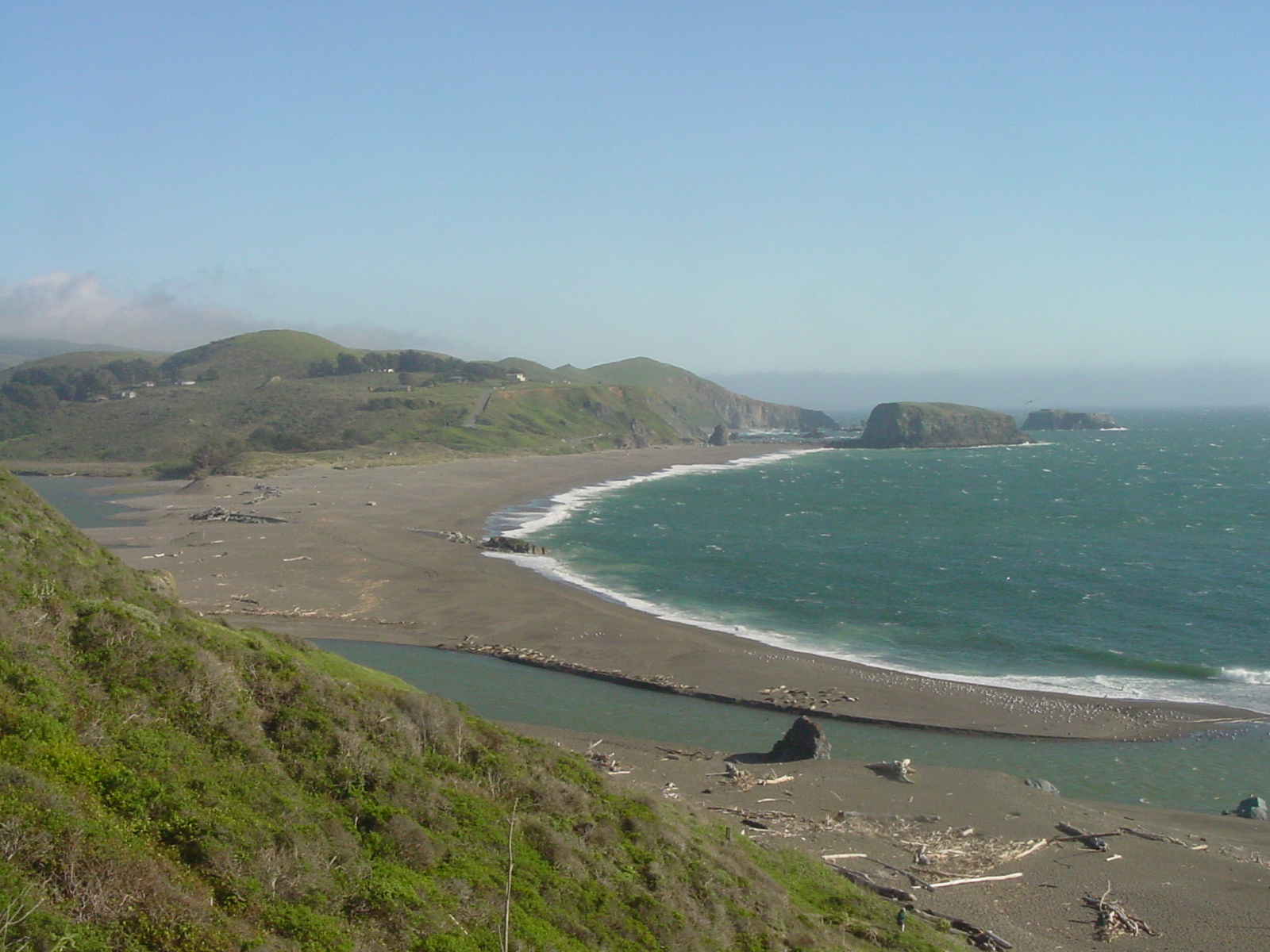
Goat Rock Beach as viewed from the Jenner Cliffs looking south, showing the mouth of the Russian River at the Pacific Ocean

Much of central and northern Sonoma County is in the watershed of the Russian River and its tributaries. The river rises in the coastal mountains of Mendocino County, north of the city of Ukiah, and flows into Lake Mendocino, a major flood control reservoir. The river flows south from the lake through Mendocino to Sonoma County, paralleled by Highway 101. It turns west at Healdsburg, receiving water from Lake Sonoma via Dry Creek, and empties into the Pacific Ocean at Jenner.

==== Laguna de Santa Rosa ====
The Laguna de Santa Rosa is the largest tributary of the Russian River. It is 14 miles (23 km) long, running north from Cotati to the Russian River near Forestville. Its flood plain is more than 7,500 acres (30 km^{2}). It drains a 254-square-mile (660 km^{2}) watershed, including most of the Santa Rosa Plain.

The Laguna de Santa Rosa Foundation says:

The Laguna de Santa Rosa is Sonoma County's richest area of wildlife habitat, and the most biologically diverse region of Sonoma County (itself the second-most biologically diverse county in California)... It is a unique ecological system covering more than 30,000 acres (120 km^{2}) and comprisedof a mosaic of creeks, open water, perennial marshes, seasonal wetlands, riparian forests, oak woodlands, and grasslands... As the receiving water of a watershed where most of the county's human population lives, it is a landscape feature of critical importance to Sonoma County's water quality, flood control, and biodiversity.

The Laguna's largest tributary is Santa Rosa Creek, which runs through Santa Rosa. Its major tributaries are Brush Creek, Mark West Creek, Matanzas Creek, Spring Creek, and Piner Creek. Santa Rosa Creek was shown to be polluted in Sonoma county first flush results.

==== Other water bodies ====
The boundary with Marin County runs from the mouth of the Estero Americano at Bodega Bay, up Americano Creek, then overland to San Antonio Creek and down the Petaluma River to its mouth at the northwest corner of San Pablo Bay, which adjoins San Francisco Bay. The southern edge of Sonoma County comprises the northern shore of San Pablo Bay between the Marin County border at the Petaluma River and the border with Solano County at Sonoma Creek. Sonoma County has no incorporated communities directly on the shore of San Pablo Bay.

The Petaluma River, Tolay Creek, and Sonoma Creek enter the bay at the county's southernmost tip. The intertidal zone where they join the bay is the vast Napa Sonoma Marsh.

Americano Creek, the Petaluma River, Tolay Creek, and Sonoma Creek are the principal streams draining the southern portion of the county. The Sonoma Valley is drained by Sonoma Creek, whose major tributaries are Yulupa Creek, Graham Creek, Calabazas Creek, Schell Creek, and Carriger Creek; Arroyo Seco Creek is a tributary to Schell Creek. Other creeks include Foss, Felta, and Mill.

Lakes and reservoirs in the county include Lake Sonoma, Tolay Lake, Lake Ilsanjo, Santa Rosa Creek Reservoir, Lake Ralphine, and Fountaingrove Lake.

=== Marine protected areas ===
Like underwater parks, these marine protected areas help conserve ocean wildlife and marine ecosystems.

- Del Mar Landing State Marine Reserve
- Stewarts Point State Marine Reserve & Stewarts Point State Marine Conservation Area
- Salt Point State Marine Conservation Area
- Gerstle Cove State Marine Reserve
- Russian River State Marine Reserve and Russian River State Marine Conservation Area
- Bodega Head State Marine Reserve & Bodega Head State Marine Conservation Area
- Estero Americano State Marine Recreational Management Area

=== Threatened/endangered species ===
A number of endangered plants and animals are found in Sonoma County, including the California clapper rail (Rallus longirostris obsoletus), salt marsh harvest mouse (Reithrodontomys raviventris), northern red-legged frog (Rana aurora), Sacramento splittail (Pogonichthys macrolepidotus), California freshwater shrimp (Syncaris pacifica), showy Indian clover (Trifolium amoenum), Hickman's potentilla (Potentilla hickmanii), northern spotted owl (Strix occidentalis caurina), and marbled murrelet (Brachyramphus marmoratus).

Species of special local concern include the California tiger salamander (Ambystoma californiense), coho salmon, and some endangered plants, including Burke's goldfields (Lasthenia burkei), Sebastopol meadowfoam (Limnanthes vinculans), and Sonoma sunshine or Baker's stickyseed (Blennosperma bakeri).

Endangered species that are endemic to Sonoma County include Sebastopol meadowfoam, Sonoma sunshine, and Pitkin Marsh lily (Lilium pardalinum subsp. pitkinense).

The Sonoma County Water Agency has had a Fisheries Enhancement Program since 1996. Its website says:

"The primary focus of the FEP is to enhance habitat for three salmonids: Steelhead, Chinook salmon, and Coho salmon. These three species are listed as threatened under the U.S. Endangered Species Act. The California Department of Fish and Game considers the Coho salmon endangered."

=== Adjacent counties ===
- Mendocino County – north
- Lake County – northeast
- Napa County – east
- Solano County – southeast
- Marin County – south
- Contra Costa County – south-southeast (water only, single point)

=== National protected area ===
- San Pablo Bay National Wildlife Refuge (part)

== Transportation ==
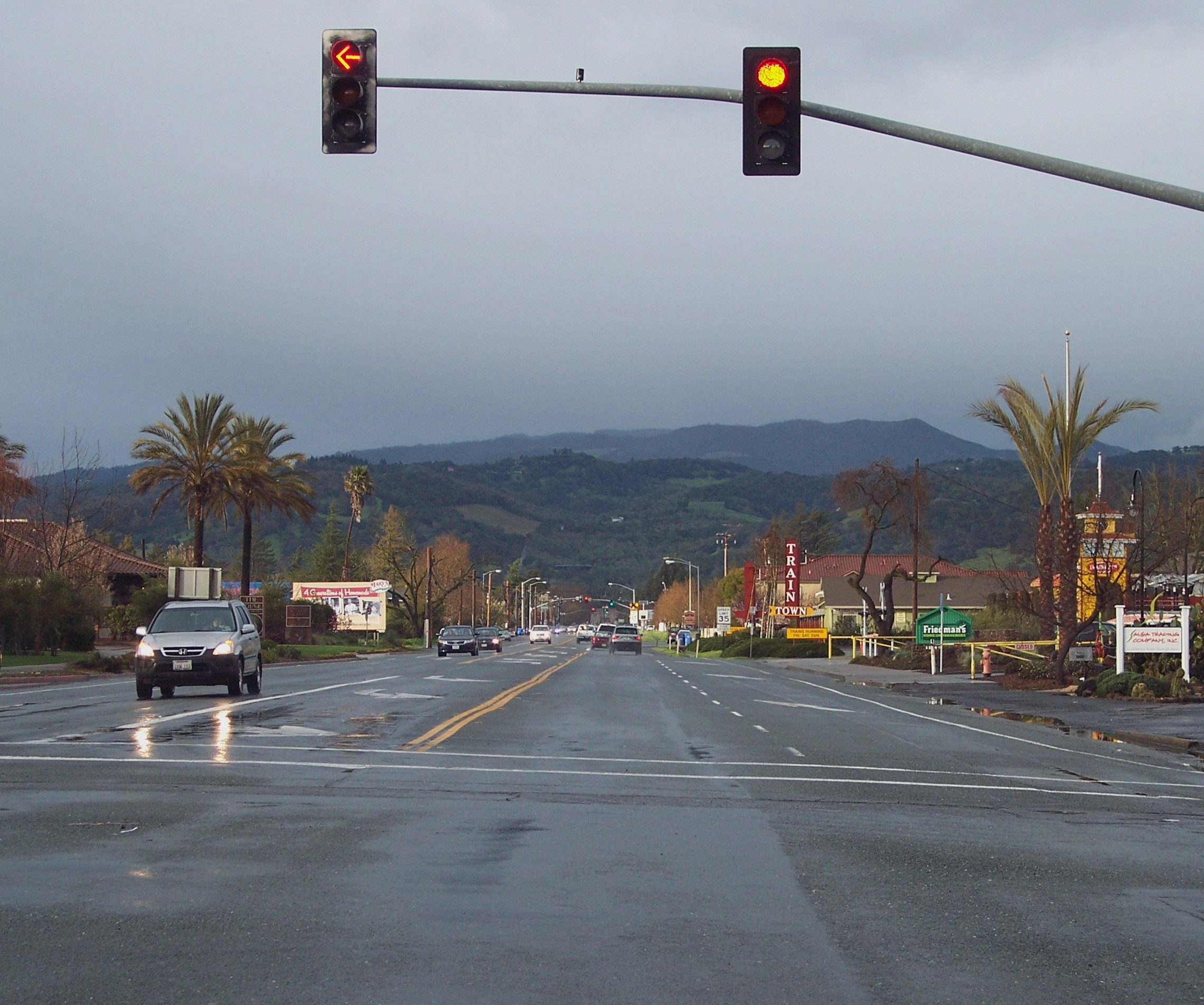
State Route 12 in Sonoma (Broadway)

=== Major highways ===
- U.S. Route 101
- State Route 1
- State Route 12
- State Route 37
- State Route 116
- State Route 121
- State Route 128

=== Public transportation ===
- Sonoma County Transit is the countywide transit operator, providing service to all cities in Sonoma County.
- CityBus operates within the city limits of Santa Rosa.
- The cities of Cloverdale and Petaluma also provide their own local bus service.
- Golden Gate Transit connects Santa Rosa and points south with Marin County and San Francisco.
- Mendocino Transit Authority runs north from Santa Rosa to Ukiah (via US 101) and to the coast (via California Routes 12 and 1).
- Sonoma–Marin Area Rail Transit (SMART) is a commuter rail line eventually planned to go between Larkspur in Marin County and Cloverdale in Sonoma County. As of June 2025, the line operates between Larkspur and Windsor.

=== Airports ===
The Charles M. Schulz - Sonoma County Airport is at 2290 Airport Boulevard, west of Highway 101, between Santa Rosa and Windsor. Its main runway is 5,115 feet (1,559 m) long and 150 feet (46 m) wide, and can accommodate planes up to 95,000 pounds (43,000 kg) maximum gross takeoff weight. It offers fuel, major maintenance, hangar space, and tie-downs for local and transient aircraft. Alaska Airlines, American Airlines, and United Airlines offer regular daily commercial flights.

There are five general aviation airports within the county:

- Cloverdale Municipal Airport
- Healdsburg Municipal Airport
- Petaluma Municipal Airport
- Sonoma Skypark
- Sonoma Valley Airport

=== Railroads ===
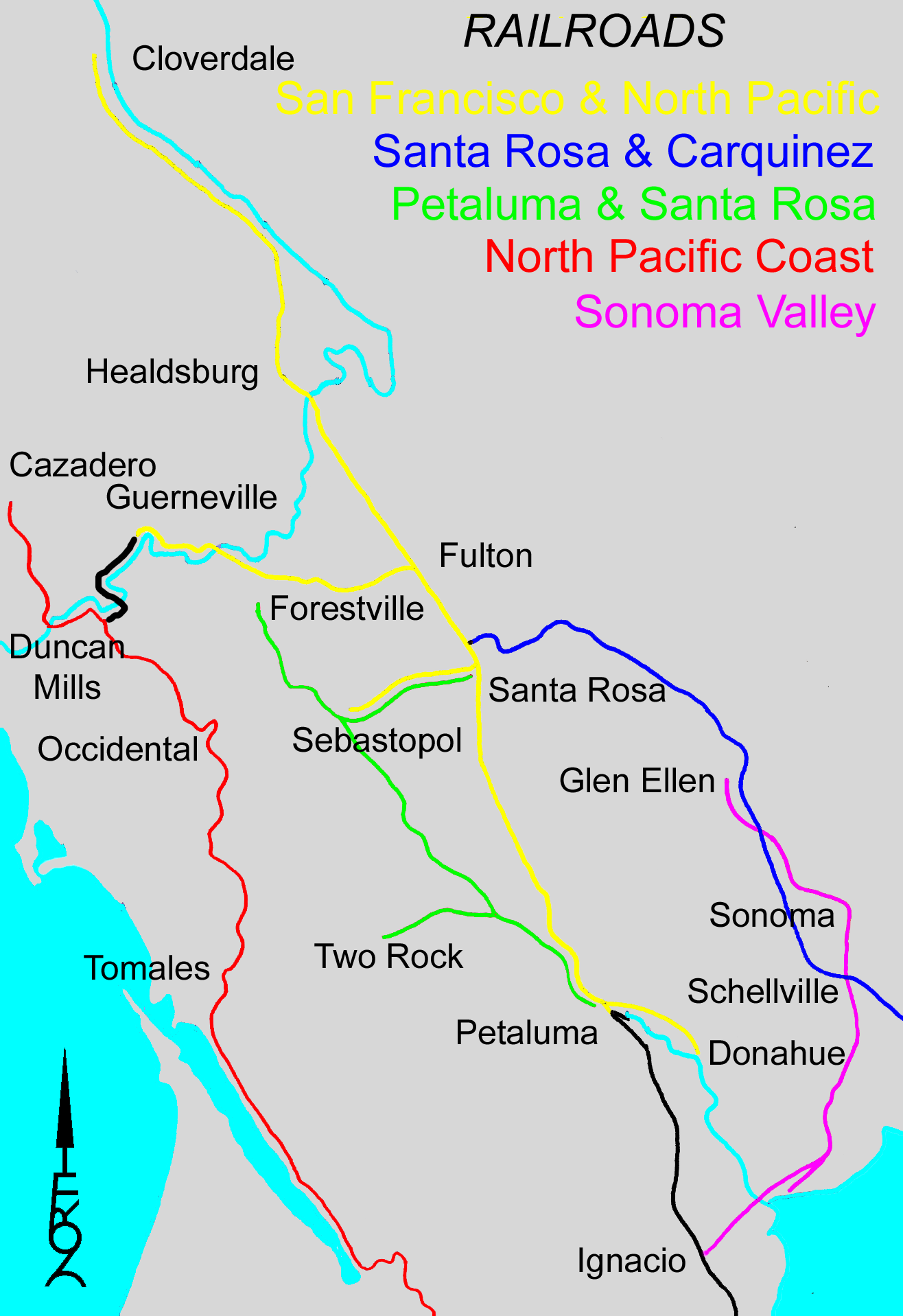
Historical railroads of Sonoma County

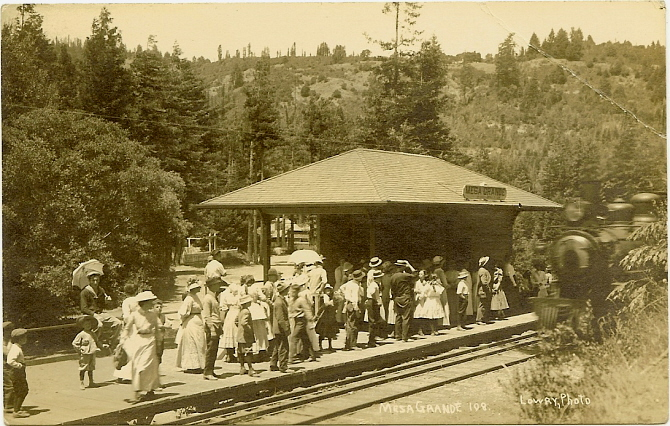
Mesa Grande train station, c. 1910

In 1864, the Petaluma and Haystack Railroad connected the city of Petaluma to a ferry landing at the head of navigation on the Petaluma River.

In 1870, the San Francisco and North Pacific Railroad (SF&NP) connected the City of Santa Rosa to ferry connections at Donahue landing on the Petaluma River. Rail service was extended north to Healdsburg in 1871 and Cloverdale in 1872. In 1884 the railroad was extended south to an alternate ferry connection in Tiburon. This rail line serves as the primary route of Sonoma–Marin Area Rail Transit.

The 3-foot-gauge North Pacific Coast Railroad extended northward in 1876 from a ferry connection at Sausalito through Valley Ford, Freestone, and Occidental to Monte Rio on the lower Russian River. Service was extended to Duncans Mills in 1877 and Cazadero in 1885. The standard gauge Fulton and Guerneville Railroad left the SF&NP at Fulton to reach Korbel in 1876 and Guerneville in 1877. Standard-gauge rails were extended down-river to Duncan Mills in 1909 after the Northwestern Pacific Railroad merger, and narrow-gauge service was discontinued in 1930. The standard-gauge route became River Road after tracks were removed in 1935.

The unique Sonoma Valley Prismoidal Railway linked the city of Sonoma to bay ferries in 1876 and was replaced in 1879 by the 3-foot (0.91 m)-gauge Sonoma Valley Railroad to a ferry landing near the mouth of the Petaluma River. Service was extended from Sonoma to Glen Ellen in 1882. The southern end of the line was extended westward in 1888 to a connection with the SF&NP at Ignacio. This line was converted to standard-gauge in 1890 and remains (in 2018) as Sonoma County's connection to the national rail system at Schellville.

Southern Pacific subsidiary Santa Rosa and Carquinez Railroad extended eastward in 1888 to link Santa Rosa with the national rail system. The portion between Sonoma and Santa Rosa was dismantled in the 1940s after interchange shifted to the former Sonoma Valley line.

A SF&NP branch line from Santa Rosa brought rail service to Sebastopol in 1890. The Petaluma and Santa Rosa Railroad extended interurban service north from a ferry connection in Petaluma to reach Sebastopol in 1904, Santa Rosa in 1905, and Forestville in 1906. Portions of this line were converted to the Joe Rodota Trail after tracks were removed in the 1980s.

The Sonoma–Marin Area Rail Transit commuter rail line inaugurated passenger service on August 25, 2017, utilizing the Northwestern Pacific Railroad right-of-way from Sonoma County Airport station to Larkspur Landing in Marin. The system is planned to extend to Cloverdale Depot.

== Crime ==
The following table includes the number of incidents reported and the rate per 1,000 persons for each type of offense in the year of 2009.

Population and crime rates
Population	478,551	
Violent crime	1,917	4.01
Homicide	9	0.02
Forcible rape	163	0.34
Robbery	318	0.66
Aggravated assault	1,427	2.98
Property crime	4,537	9.48
Burglary	1,993	4.16
Larceny-theft (Note: Only larceny-theft cases involving property over $400 in value are reported as property crimes.)	6,671	13.94
Motor vehicle theft	786	1.64
Arson	85	0.18

=== Cities by population and crime rates ===
Cities by population and crime rates
City	Population	Violent crimes	Violent crime rate per 1,000 persons	Property crimes	Property crime rate per 1,000 persons
Cloverdale	8,775	6	0.68	157	17.89
Cotati	7,398	54	7.30	85	11.49
Healdsburg	11,458	18	1.57	271	23.65
Petaluma	58,995	167	2.83	822	13.93
Rohnert Park	41,716	192	4.60	770	18.46
Santa Rosa	170,862	636	3.72	3,818	22.35
Sebastopol	7,512	8	1.06	170	22.63
Sonoma	10,841	27	2.49	193	17.80
Windsor	27,293	67	2.45	318	11.65

== Demographics ==
Historical population
Census	Pop.	Note	%±
1850	560		—
1860	11,867		2,019.1%
1870	19,819		67.0%
1880	25,926		30.8%
1890	32,721		26.2%
1900	38,480		17.6%
1910	48,394		25.8%
1920	52,090		7.6%
1930	62,222		19.5%
1940	69,052		11.0%
1950	103,405		49.7%
1960	147,375		42.5%
1970	204,885		39.0%
1980	299,681		46.3%
1990	388,222		29.5%
2000	458,614		18.1%
2010	483,878		5.5%
2020	488,863		1.0%
2025 (est.)	486,444	▼	−0.5%
U.S. Decennial Census; 1790–1960 1900–1990; 1990–2000 2010 2020 2022

=== 2020 census ===
As of the 2020 census, the county had a population of 488,863. The median age was 42.6 years. 19.6% of residents were under the age of 18 and 20.9% of residents were 65 years of age or older. For every 100 females there were 95.3 males, and for every 100 females age 18 and over there were 93.2 males age 18 and over.

The racial makeup of the county was 62.7% White, 1.6% Black or African American, 1.8% American Indian and Alaska Native, 4.7% Asian, 0.4% Native Hawaiian and Pacific Islander, 15.3% from some other race, and 13.5% from two or more races. Hispanic or Latino residents of any race comprised 28.9% of the population.

86.4% of residents lived in urban areas, while 13.6% lived in rural areas.

There were 187,701 households in the county, of which 28.3% had children under the age of 18 living with them and 27.8% had a female householder with no spouse or partner present. About 26.5% of all households were made up of individuals and 14.2% had someone living alone who was 65 years of age or older.

There were 204,742 housing units, of which 8.3% were vacant. Among occupied housing units, 60.2% were owner-occupied and 39.8% were renter-occupied. The homeowner vacancy rate was 1.0% and the rental vacancy rate was 4.8%.

=== Racial and ethnic composition ===
Sonoma County, California – Racial and ethnic composition Note: the US Census treats Hispanic/Latino as an ethnic category. This table excludes Latinos from the racial categories and assigns them to a separate category. Hispanics/Latinos may be of any race.
Race / Ethnicity (NH = Non-Hispanic)	Pop 1980	Pop 1990	Pop 2000	Pop 2010	Pop 2020	% 1980	% 1990	% 2000	% 2010	% 2020
White alone (NH)	266,205	327,429	341,686	320,027	285,792	88.83%	84.34%	74.50%	66.14%	58.46%
Black or African American alone (NH)	3,370	5,268	6,116	6,769	7,125	1.12%	1.36%	1.33%	1.40%	1.46%
Native American or Alaska Native alone (NH)	3,494	3,663	3,477	3,584	3,053	1.17%	0.94%	0.76%	0.74%	0.62%
Asian alone (NH)	4,636	10,234	13,786	17,777	22,239	1.55%	2.64%	3.01%	3.67%	4.55%
Native Hawaiian or Pacific Islander alone (NH)	x	x	828	1,434	1,708	x	x	0.18%	0.30%	0.35%
Other race alone (NH)	1,152	405	921	913	2,909	0.38%	0.10%	0.20%	0.19%	0.60%
Mixed race or Multiracial (NH)	x	x	12,289	12,944	24,599	x	x	2.68%	2.68%	5.03%
Hispanic or Latino (any race)	20,824	41,223	79,511	120,430	141,438	6.95%	10.62%	17.34%	24.89%	28.93%
Total	299,681	388,222	458,614	483,878	488,863	100.00%	100.00%	100.00%	100.00%	100.00%

=== American Community Survey 2025 data ===
The United States Census Bureau estimated that in 2025, Sonoma County’s population was 486.444. It was also estimated that the county's population was 56,34% Non-Hispanic White, 31,55% Hispanic or Latino, 1,65% Non-Hispanic Black, 5,22% Asian, 0,64% Native American, 0,41% Pacific Islander, and 4,18% Multiracial.

Total	Population	Percentage
Non-Hispanic White	274.073	56,34%
Hispanic or Latino	153.489	31,55%
Non-Hispanic Black	8.015	1,65%
Asian	25.414	5,22%
Native American	3.091	0,64%
Pacific Islander	2.006	0,41%
Non-Hispanic Multiracial	20.356	4,18%

=== 2010 census ===
The 2010 United States census reported that Sonoma County had a population of 483,878. The racial makeup of Sonoma County was 371,412 (76.8%) White, 7,610 (1.6%) African American, 6,489 (1.3%) Native American, 18,341 (3.8%) Asian, 1,558 (0.3%) Pacific Islander, 56,966 (11.8%) from other races, and 21,502 (4.4%) from two or more races. There were 120,430 residents of Hispanic or Latino ancestry, of any race (24.9%).

Population reported at 2010 United States census
The County	Total; Population	White	African; American	Native; American	Asian	Pacific; Islander	other races	two or more races	Hispanic or Latino (of any race)
Sonoma County	483,878	371,412	7,610	6,489	18,341	1,558	56,966	21,502	120,430
Incorporated cities and towns	Total; Population	White	African; American	Native; American	Asian	Pacific; Islander	other races	two or more races	Hispanic or Latino (of any race)
Cloverdale	8,618	6,458	48	156	98	7	1,530	321	2,824
Cotati	7,265	5,929	122	75	283	30	427	399	1,255
Healdsburg	11,254	8,334	56	205	125	18	2,133	383	3,820
Petaluma	57,941	46,566	801	353	2,607	129	5,103	2,382	12,453
Rohnert Park	40,971	31,178	759	407	2,144	179	3,967	2,337	9,068
Santa Rosa	167,815	119,158	4,079	2,808	8,746	810	23,723	8,491	47,970
Sebastopol	7,379	6,509	72	60	120	19	298	301	885
Sonoma	10,648	9,242	52	56	300	23	711	264	1,634
Windsor	26,801	19,798	227	594	810	51	4,052	1,269	8,511
Census-designated places	Total; Population	White	African; American	Native; American	Asian	Pacific; Islander	other races	two or more races	Hispanic or Latino (of any race)
Bloomfield	345	282	0	0	4	0	52	7	62
Bodega	220	209	0	2	2	0	0	7	9
Bodega Bay	1,077	951	2	4	33	4	49	34	126
Boyes Hot Springs	6,656	4,505	48	91	84	9	1,674	245	3,270
Carmet	47	43	0	0	1	0	0	3	0
Cazadero	354	318	1	7	5	0	5	18	23
El Verano	4,123	3,054	22	22	101	12	717	195	1,559
Eldridge	1,233	988	10	3	36	6	144	46	325
Fetters Hot Springs-Agua Caliente	4,144	2,926	25	39	68	8	895	183	1,925
Forestville	3,293	2,914	32	36	53	6	153	99	406
Fulton	541	349	3	12	11	1	149	16	186
Geyserville	862	609	5	7	14	0	192	35	328
Glen Ellen	784	693	3	9	16	3	18	42	67
Graton	1,707	1,402	10	29	25	3	144	94	322
Guerneville	4,534	3,926	31	68	47	12	226	224	553
Jenner	136	125	2	0	2	0	0	7	8
Kenwood	1,028	930	1	1	23	2	45	26	79
Larkfield-Wikiup	8,884	7,042	81	168	292	19	878	404	1,979
Monte Rio	1,152	1,047	10	6	11	1	16	61	79
Occidental	1,115	992	7	7	31	0	23	55	81
Penngrove	2,522	2,212	19	24	54	2	112	99	292
Roseland	6,325	3,235	130	224	276	15	2,078	367	3,773
Salmon Creek	86	86	0	0	0	0	0	0	1
Sea Ranch	1,305	1,220	15	3	10	0	37	20	117
Sereno del Mar	126	118	1	0	1	1	2	3	8
Temelec	1,441	1,376	4	4	31	5	5	16	68
Timber Cove	164	152	1	1	6	0	0	4	9
Valley Ford	147	105	1	0	0	0	33	8	52
Other unincorporated areas	Total; Population	White	African; American	Native; American	Asian	Pacific; Islander	other races	two or more races	Hispanic or Latino (of any race)
All others not CDPs (combined)	90,835	76,431	930	1,008	1,871	183	7,375	3,037	16,303

=== 2000 ===
At the 2000 United States census, there were 458,614 people, 172,403 households, and 112,406 families in Sonoma County. The population density was 291 per square mile (112/km^{2}). There were 183,153 housing units at an average density of 116 per square mile (45/km^{2}).

Of the 172,403 households, 50.3% were married couples living together, 34.8% were non-families, and 10.4% had a female householder with no husband present. 31.9% had children under the age of 18 living with them, 25.7% were individuals, and 10.0% were 65 years of age or older living alone. The average household size was 2.60, and the average family size was 3.12.

The median age was 38 years. 24.5% were under 18, 8.8% from 18 to 24, 29.2% from 25 to 44, 24.9% from 45 to 64, and 12.6% were 65 years of age or older. For every 100 females there were 97 males. For every 100 females age 18 and over, there were 94 males.

The median household income was $53,076, and the median family income was $61,921. Males had a median income of $42,035, females $32,022. The per capita income for the county was $25,724. About 4.7% of families and 8.1% of the population were below the poverty line, including 8.4% of those under age 18 and 5.7% of those age 65 or over.

=== Metropolitan statistical area ===
The United States Office of Management and Budget has designated Sonoma County as the Santa Rosa-Petaluma, CA metropolitan statistical area. The United States Census Bureau ranked the Santa Rosa-Petaluma, CA metropolitan statistical area as the 105th most populous metropolitan statistical area of the United States as of July 1, 2012.

The Office of Management and Budget has further designated the Santa Rosa-Petaluma, CA metropolitan statistical area as a component of the more extensive San Francisco Bay Area, the 5th most populous combined statistical area and primary statistical area of the United States as of July 1, 2012.

== Government and policing ==
The government of Sonoma County operates as a general law county, defined and authorized under the California Constitution and law. It does not have a county charter.

The county's governing board and legislative body is the five-member Sonoma County Board of Supervisors. Supervisors are elected by district at the consolidated primary election, and serve for four years. The supervisors also sit as directors of several local jurisdictions, such as Sonoma Water, and the Agricultural Preservation & Open Space District.

The current supervisors (as of January 2025) are:

- District 1: Rebecca Hermosillo,
- District 2: David Rabbitt,
- District 3: Chris Coursey,
- District 4: James Gore, and
- District 5: Lynda Hopkins.

The supervisors appoint the members of 59 boards, commissions, and committees.

The county administrator is the county's chief executive officer, reporting to the Board of Supervisors. The administrator manages the county's departments, such as the regional parks department.

On December 15, 2009, the board announced the appointment of Veronica Ferguson to be the first female county administrator. She assumed office on February 1, 2010.

On May 1, 2014, the county launched a public utility named Sonoma Clean Power. This utility was created under the guidelines of Community Choice Aggregation.

=== State and federal representation ===
Sonoma County is split between California's 2nd and 4th congressional districts, represented by Jared Huffman (D–San Rafael) and Mike Thompson (D–St. Helena), respectively.

In the California State Assembly, Sonoma County is split between the 2nd, 4th, and 10th districts, which are held by Democrat Chris Rogers, Democrat Cecilia Aguiar-Curry, and Democrat Damon Connolly, respectively. In the California State Senate, the county is split between the 2nd senatorial district, represented by Democrat Mike McGuire, and the 3rd senatorial district, represented by Democrat Christopher Cabaldon.

=== Law enforcement ===
The Sonoma County Sheriff's Office is the law enforcement agency for the county's unincorporated area. It also contracts to provide the police forces of the City of Sonoma and the Town of Windsor. The office has more than 670 employees, including more than 240 Deputy Sheriffs, in four bureaus. More than 200 Correctional Officers and staff work in two jail facilities; Main Area Detention Facility and the North County Detention Facility, with a total daily population of nearly 750 inmates. Police shootings in 2007 led to calls for an independent civilian police review board; which was established in 2015.

=== Incidents ===
==== 2015 "Yard Counseling" torture incident ====
In 2015, news broke of systematic torture by the Sonoma County Sheriff's Office. One victim suffered from internal bleeding, and was subsequently denied medical care for several days. Numerous victims claim that they were inflicted with various forms of head and brain trauma and sustained brain injury.

==== Allegations of sexual misconduct by public officials ====
Dominic Foppoli was a mayor of Windsor, and on the town council. He was accused of rape or sexual assault by 14 different women. Accusations include the use of date rape drugs, alcohol, violence, and manipulation.

Robert Jacob was the mayor of Sebastopol, and was convicted of child sexual abuse.

== Economy ==
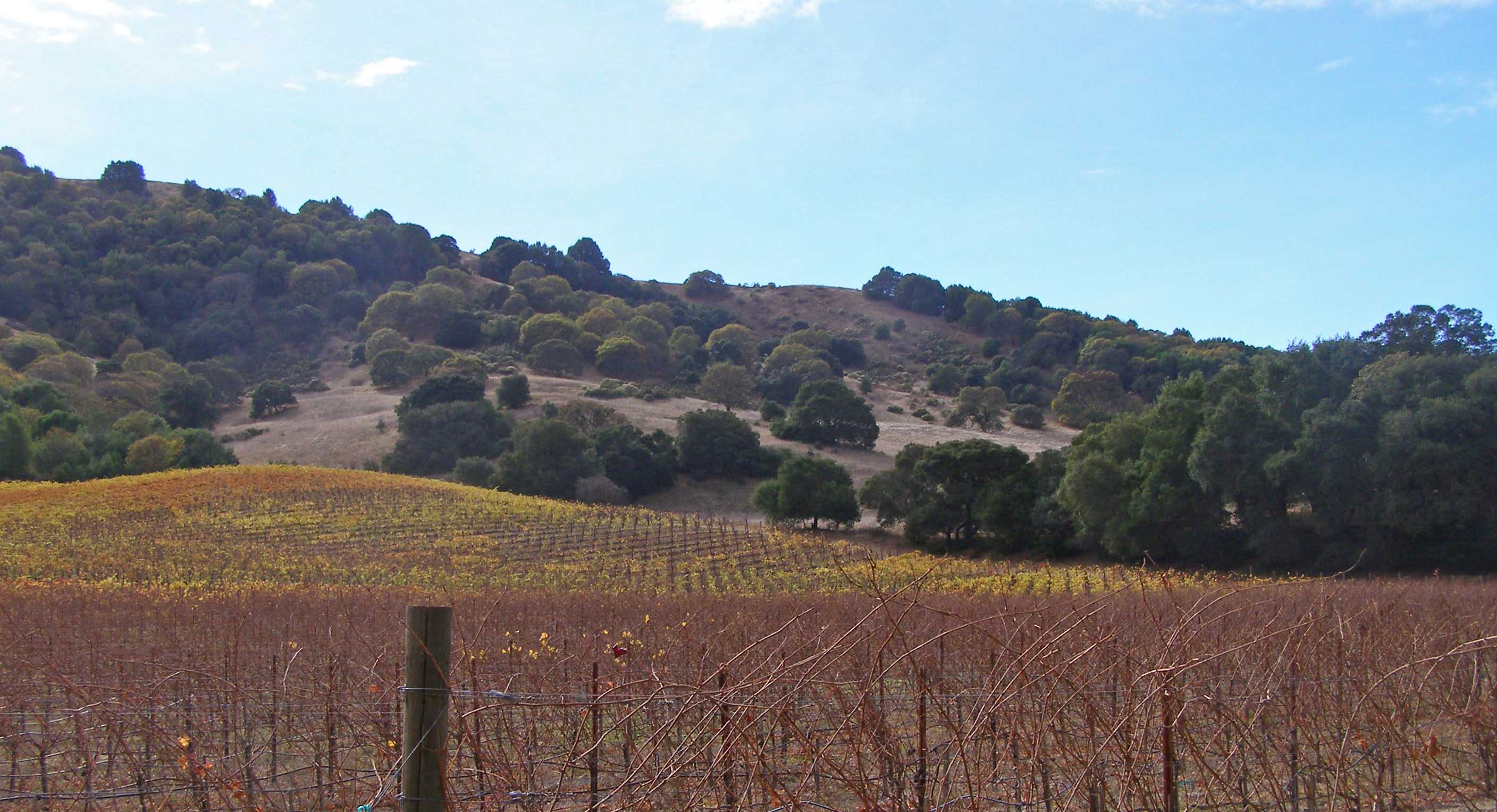
Vineyard on northwest flank of Sonoma Mountain

Agriculture has long played a critical role in Sonoma County's economy, and it makes up a major component of California's Wine Country. Just over 2% of the population works in agriculture, nearly twice the state average. Similar to other regions of the state, the county's mild climate and fertile soil allow for the cultivation of a wide variety of crops, ornamentals, and for the raising of livestock. Beyond the production of grapes, the county's agricultural heartland is primarily located in the west and southwest, and near the cities of Petaluma and Sebastopol. The renowned horticulturalist Luther Burbank, who created hundreds of new varieties of plants and crops, lived and worked in Sonoma County for much of his life.

Winemaking in the county is by far its most valuable industry and a major part of the economic and cultural life. First established in 1850 by a Franciscan priest named Fr. Jose Altimira of the Mission San Francisco Solano, the production of wine has perhaps become Sonoma County's most well known feature. In 2004, growers harvested 165,783 short tons (150,396 t)s) of wine grapes worth US$310 million. In 2006 the Sonoma County grape harvest amounted to over 185,000 tons, exceeding Napa County's harvest by more than 30 percent. About 80 percent of non-pasture agricultural land in the county is for growing wine grapes—58,280.4 acres (235.852 km^{2}) in 2014 of vineyards, with over 1100 growers. In 2019 Sonoma County's wine industry had produced over $654,000,000 worth of wine grapes. The most common varieties planted are Chardonnay, Sauvignon blanc, Cabernet Sauvignon, and Pinot noir, though the area is also known for its Merlot and Zinfandel. Sonoma County is home to more than 425 wineries with sixteen distinct and two shared American Viticultural Areas, including the Sonoma Valley AVA, Russian River Valley AVA, Alexander Valley AVA, Bennett Valley AVA and Dry Creek Valley AVA, the last of which is known for the production of high-quality Zinfandels.

Dairy farming is another major agricultural sector, particularly prominent in the western reaches of the county and in the Petaluma Gap. Worth nearly $140,000,000 in 2019, Sonoma County is home to nearly 65 registered dairies, including the locally prominent Clover Sonoma and the Straus Family Creamery. In addition to milk, the county is home to producers of cheese and yogurt. It was reported that in 2018, just over half of all of the county's dairies were certified as organic.

Poultry farming and other livestock can be found throughout the county, but is particularly prominent near the city of Petaluma. The raising of chickens (for eggs and as broilers), cattle, sheep, and to a lesser extent hogs comprised a $250,000,000 industry in 2019.

Fishing and Crabbing was worth just over $9,300,000 in 2019 and is primarily concentrated on Bodega Bay. Although numerous species are fished and farmed, the most prominent include Dungeness crab and Chinook salmon.

Behind grapes, apples are the second most common crop grown in Sonoma County, particularly near the city of Sebastopol, and is an industry worth nearly $2,000,000. Although several varieties are grown, the region is most well known for its renowned Gravenstein apples. The county is also home to farms producing olives, hay, rye, oats, and various vegetables (particularly tomatoes, carrots, green beans, and celery). There are also numerous nurseries producing flowers and other decorative ornamentals.

The Timber Industry is not as prominent as it once was and is concentrated along the western and northwestern coastlines. The most common trees that are logged are Redwoods, as well as various Pines and Oaks.

Similar to other Bay Area communities, Sonoma County is also home to several tech industry companies, such as Keysight (formerly a part of Agilent Technologies) in Santa Rosa. Sonoma County is home to several notable brewing and beverage companies including: Bear Republic Brewing Company, Guayakí, Lagunitas Brewing Company, and the Russian River Brewing Company. The clothing manufacturer Marmot is based in Rohnert Park.

== Politics ==
For most of the 20th century, Sonoma County was a Republican stronghold in presidential elections. From 1896 until 1988, the only Democrats to carry Sonoma were Woodrow Wilson in 1912, Franklin D. Roosevelt in 1932 and 1936, and Lyndon B. Johnson in 1964. Like the rest of the Bay Area, it has since become a Democratic stronghold. The last Republican to win a majority in the county was Ronald Reagan in 1984, and the last Republican to represent a significant part of the county in Congress was Representative Donald H. Clausen, who left office in January 1983.

United States presidential election results for Sonoma County, California (Note: This total comprised 5,806 votes for Progressive Theodore Roosevelt (who was official Republican nominee in California), 1,494 votes for Socialist Eugene V. Debs and 367 votes for Prohibition Party nominee Eugene W. Chafin.)
Year	Republican		Democratic		Third party(ies)	
Year	No.	%	No.	%	No.	%
1880	2,290	45.44%	2,628	52.14%	122	2.42%
1884	3,044	49.42%	2,944	47.79%	172	2.79%
1888	3,293	46.97%	3,394	48.41%	324	4.62%
1892	3,016	43.40%	3,451	49.65%	483	6.95%
1896	4,053	51.86%	3,595	46.00%	168	2.15%
1900	4,381	54.04%	3,517	43.38%	209	2.58%
1904	5,269	61.64%	2,816	32.94%	463	5.42%
1908	5,427	57.50%	3,168	33.56%	844	8.94%
1912	32	0.23%	6,500	45.78%	7,667	54.00%
1916	9,733	50.37%	8,377	43.35%	1,214	6.28%
1920	10,377	66.90%	4,070	26.24%	1,065	6.87%
1924	9,535	56.00%	1,767	10.38%	5,726	33.63%
1928	12,891	59.71%	8,506	39.40%	194	0.90%
1932	9,161	35.69%	15,686	61.11%	822	3.20%
1936	11,185	38.96%	17,273	60.17%	248	0.86%
1940	16,819	51.94%	15,230	47.04%	330	1.02%
1944	16,309	50.38%	15,949	49.27%	111	0.34%
1948	22,077	55.21%	16,026	40.08%	1,881	4.70%
1952	35,605	66.09%	17,675	32.81%	594	1.10%
1956	33,659	61.92%	20,616	37.92%	86	0.16%
1960	34,641	54.10%	29,147	45.52%	244	0.38%
1964	27,677	38.37%	44,354	61.49%	105	0.15%
1968	38,088	48.79%	33,587	43.03%	6,384	8.18%
1972	57,697	54.72%	43,746	41.49%	3,991	3.79%
1976	50,555	47.72%	50,353	47.52%	5,044	4.76%
1980	60,722	48.20%	45,596	36.19%	19,667	15.61%
1984	76,447	51.08%	71,295	47.64%	1,915	1.28%
1988	67,725	41.91%	91,262	56.48%	2,596	1.61%
1992	47,619	24.09%	104,334	52.78%	45,738	23.14%
1996	53,555	29.54%	100,738	55.57%	27,004	14.89%
2000	63,529	32.25%	117,295	59.54%	16,182	8.21%
2004	68,204	30.90%	148,261	67.18%	4,225	1.91%
2008	55,127	24.04%	168,888	73.64%	5,336	2.33%
2012	54,784	25.26%	153,942	70.99%	8,139	3.75%
2016	51,408	22.03%	160,435	68.77%	21,460	9.20%
2020	61,825	23.04%	199,938	74.52%	6,554	2.44%
2024	63,426	25.22%	179,600	71.42%	8,439	3.36%

Gubernatorial elections results

Gubernatorial elections results
Year	Republican	Democratic
2022	29.1% 57,413	70.9% 140,041
2018	27.7% 58,338	72.3% 152,040
2014	25.2% 36,249	74.8% 107,328
2010	30.1% 55,472	64.7% 119,079
2006	47.0% 81,608	44.6% 77,392
2002	29.9% 43,408	50.4% 73,079
1998	29.0% 46,616	64.3% 103,235
1994	45.7% 73,234	49.7% 79,720
1990	38.6% 54,706	55.8% 79,093
1986	59.4% 75,003	37.9% 47,859
1982	45.1% 55,968	51.2% 63,542
1978	35.9% 37,584	54.3% 56,920
1974	48.0% 40,339	48.5% 40,756
1970	58.6% 44,823	39.2% 29,953
1966	60.7% 41,516	39.3% 26,898
1962	49.7% 29,647	49.2% 29,373

On November 4, 2008, Sonoma County voted 66.4% against Proposition 8 which amended the California Constitution to ban same-sex marriages.

According to the California Secretary of State, as of February 2025, there are 314,218 registered voters in Sonoma County. Of those, 175,801 (55.9%) are registered Democratic, 58,460 (18.6%) are registered Republican, and 55,463 (17.7%) declined to state a political party. Every city, town, and the unincorporated areas of Sonoma County have more registered Democrats than Republicans.

=== Voter registration statistics ===
Population and registered voters
Total population	502,146	
Registered voters (Note: Percentage of registered voters with respect to total population. Percentages of party members with respect to registered voters follow.)	314,218	62.6%
Democratic	175,801	55.9%
Republican	58,460	18.6%
Democratic–Republican spread	+117,341	+37.3%
American Independent	12,109	3.9%
Green	2,488	0.8%
Libertarian	3,636	1.2%
Peace and Freedom	1,504	0.5%
Other	4,757	1.5%
No party preference	55,463	17.7%

==== Cities by population and voter registration ====
Cities by population and voter registration
City	Population	Registered voters	Democratic	Republican	D–R spread	Other	No party preference
Cloverdale	8,390	51.8%	49.1%	24.7%	+24.4%	7.9%	21.1%
Cotati	7,154	57.4%	52.8%	17.8%	+35.0%	10.3%	22.4%
Healdsburg	11,161	56.5%	52.6%	21.7%	+30.9%	7.5%	20.6%
Petaluma	57,265	57.5%	52.3%	20.5%	+31.8%	7.8%	22.0%
Rohnert Park	40,741	50.1%	49.6%	21.3%	+28.3%	8.8%	23.2%
Santa Rosa	164,976	50.9%	52.1%	21.4%	+30.7%	7.7%	21.4%
Sebastopol	7,359	69.6%	61.4%	11.4%	+50.0%	9.8%	19.5%
Sonoma	10,430	65.0%	51.2%	22.8%	+28.4%	8.1%	20.8%
Windsor	26,229	54.4%	46.6%	27.5%	+19.1%	7.5%	21.1%

== Education ==
=== Higher education ===
- Empire College, Santa Rosa
- Golden Gate University (Rohnert Park satellite of Walnut Creek Campus)
- Santa Rosa Junior College
- Sonoma State University, Rohnert Park
- University of San Francisco (Santa Rosa Campus)

=== K-12 schools ===
The educational system of Sonoma County is similar to that of other counties in California, with a large number of independent school districts.

School districts include:

Unified:

- Calistoga Joint Unified School District
- Cloverdale Unified School District
- Cotati-Rohnert Park Unified School District
- Geyserville Unified School District
- Healdsburg Unified School District - Includes areas zoned for PK-12 and areas zoned only for 7–12
- Shoreline Unified School District
- Sonoma Valley Unified School District
- Windsor Unified School District

Secondary:

- Petaluma Joint Union High School District
- Point Arena Joint Union High School District
- Santa Rosa City School District
- West Sonoma County Union High School District

Elementary:

- Alexander Valley Union School District
- Bellevue Union School District
- Bennett Valley Union Elementary School District
- Cinnabar Elementary School District
- Dunham Elementary School District
- Forestville Union Elementary School District
- Fort Ross Elementary School District
- Gravenstein Union Elementary School District
- Guerneville Elementary School District
- Harmony Union School District
- Horicon Elementary School District
- Kashia Elementary School District
- Kenwood Elementary School District
- Laguna Joint Elementary School District
- Liberty Elementary School District
- Mark West Union Elementary School District
- Monte Rio Union Elementary School District
- Montgomery Elementary School District
- Oak Grove Union Elementary School District
- Old Adobe Union Elementary School District
- Petaluma City Elementary School District
- Piner-Olivet Union Elementary School District
- Rincon Valley Union Elementary School District
- Roseland Public Schools
- Santa Rosa Elementary School District
- Sebastopol Union Elementary School District
- Twin Hills Union Elementary School District
- Two Rock Union Elementary School District
- Waugh Elementary School District
- West Side Union Elementary School District
- Wilmar Union Elementary School District
- Wright Elementary School District

=== Library system ===
The Sonoma County Library system offers a central library in downtown Santa Rosa plus 10 branch libraries and two rural stations. More than half of Sonoma County's residents have library cards and borrow more than 2.5 million items per year. The library's website and catalog]receive over 200,000 visits annually. Staff answer nearly half a million reference questions annually for individuals, businesses and government agencies. During a typical school year over 750 classes, more than half the county total, either visit a library or are visited by a children's librarian. The library operates an adult literacy program, and computer terminals are made available for free Internet access.

== Museums ==
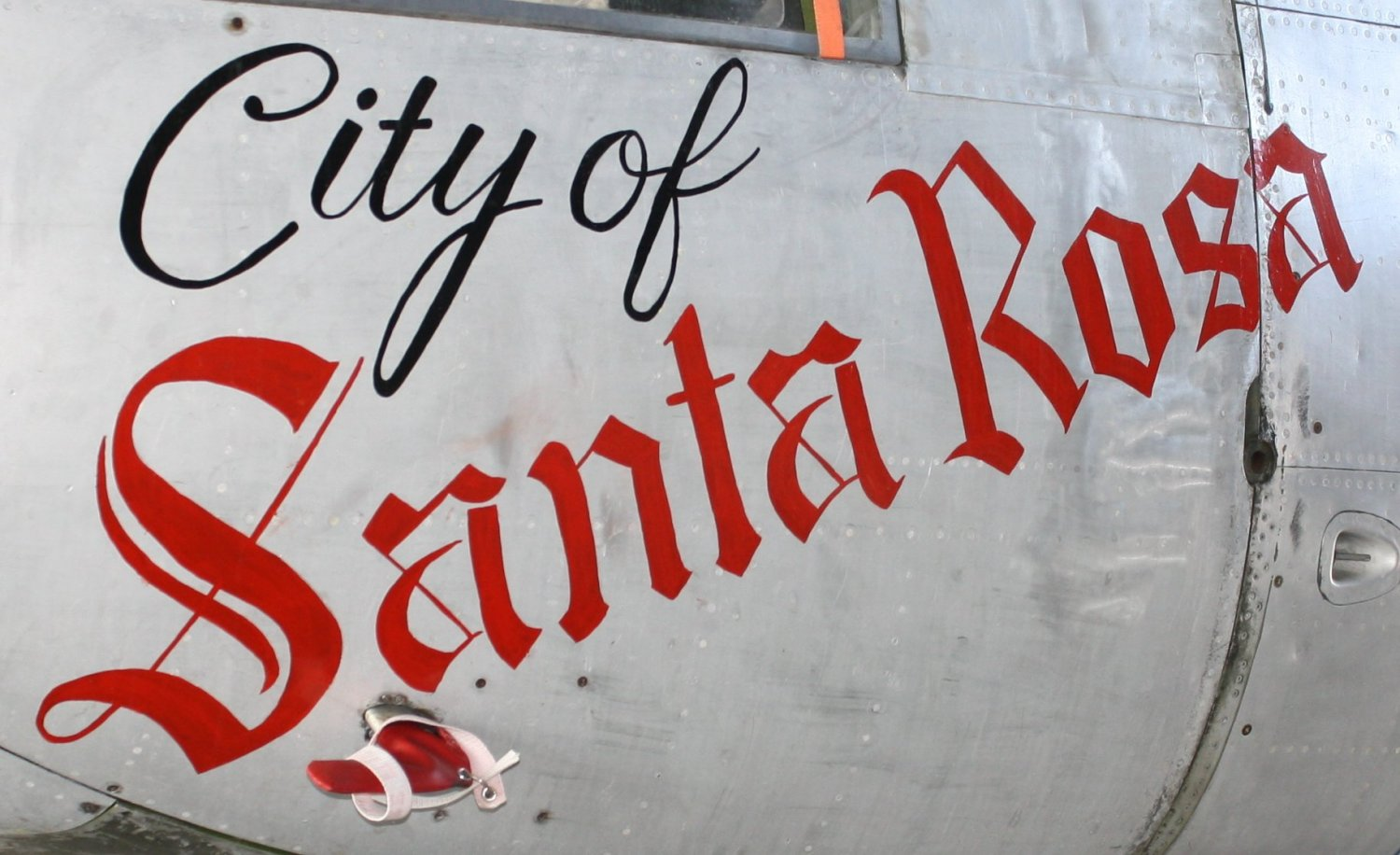
City of Santa Rosa, an A-26 Invader attack bomber built in 1944

- Pacific Coast Air Museum
- Charles M. Schulz Museum, Santa Rosa
- Museum of Sonoma County, Santa Rosa
- Luther Burbank Home and Gardens, Santa Rosa

== Places of interest ==
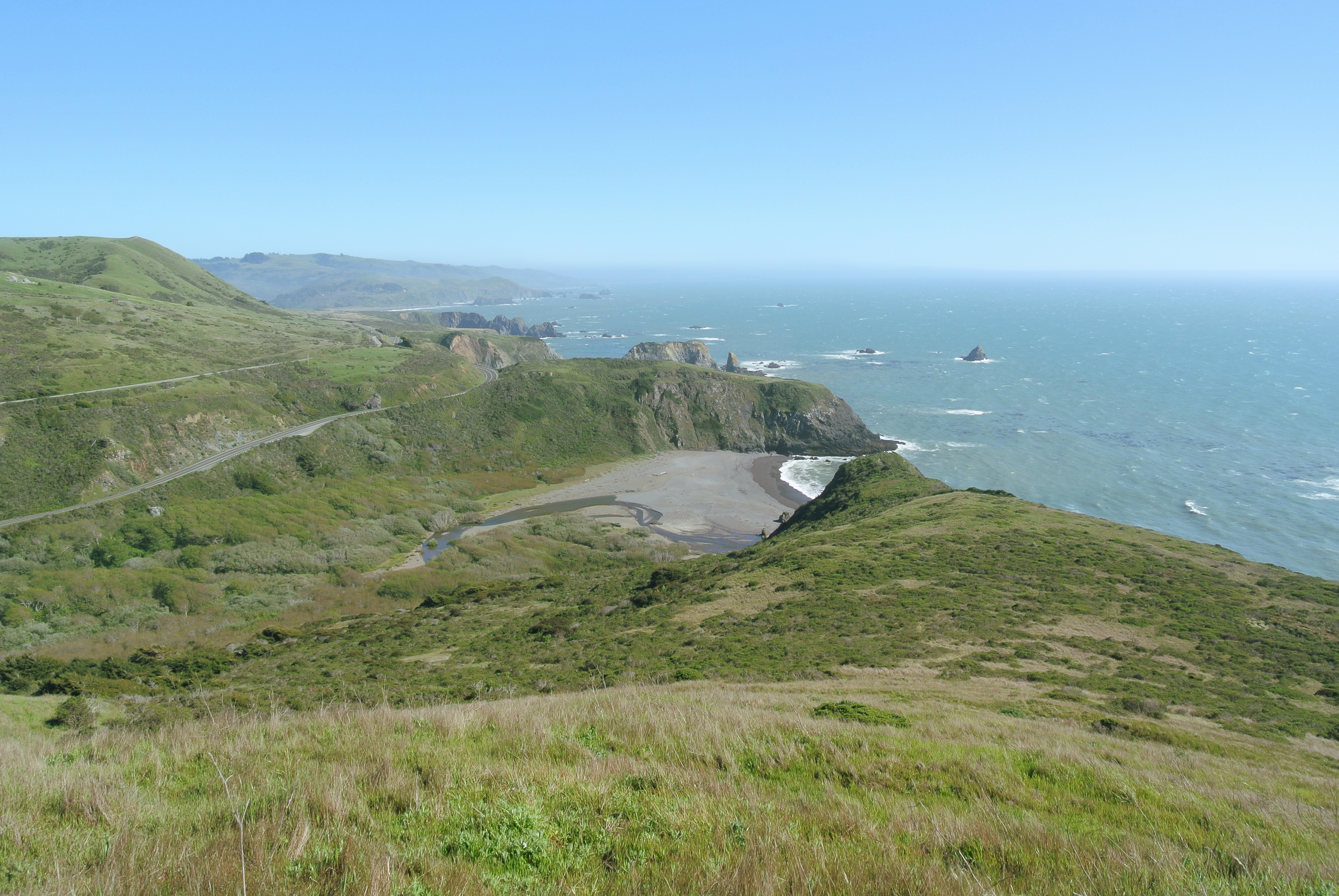
Coastal prairie in the Sonoma Coast State Park north of Jenner

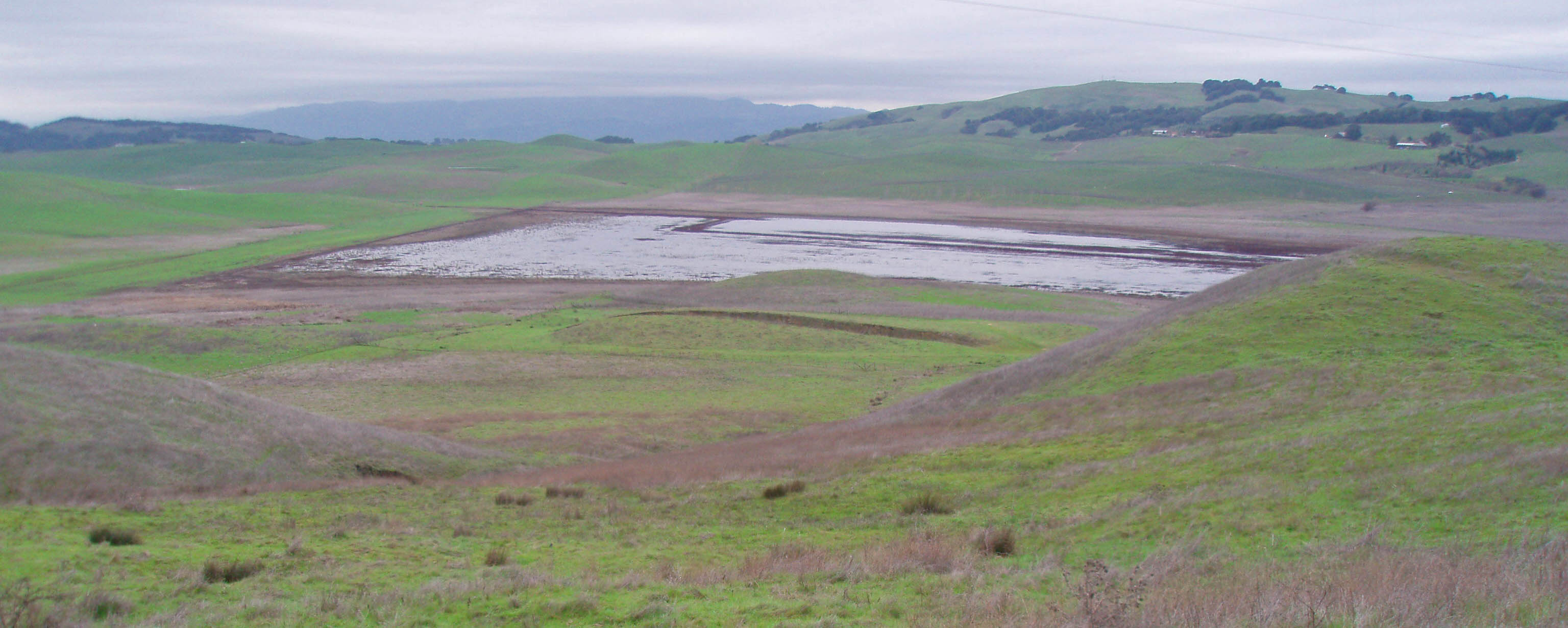
Tolay Lake Regional Park

- Armstrong Redwoods State Reserve
- Bodega Bay
- Doran Regional Park
- Fort Ross, former Russian fur trade outpost
- Grove of Old Trees
- Hood Mountain Regional Park
- Jack London State Historic Park, author Jack London's Beauty Ranch, in Glen Ellen
- Lake Sonoma
- Luther Burbank Center for the Arts
- Luther Burbank Home and Gardens
- Luther Burbank Gold Ridge Experiment Farm
- Mission San Francisco Solano, across from Sonoma Plaza
- Ocean Song
- Quarryhill Botanic Garden
- Rancho Petaluma Adobe
- Safari West
- The Sitting Room Library
- Sonoma Coast State Beach, including Arched Rock Beach, Gleason Beach and Goat Rock Beach.
- Sonoma Raceway
- Sonoma TrainTown Railroad
- Spring Lake Regional Park
- Stillwater Cove
- Sugarloaf Ridge State Park
- Tolay Lake Regional Park

== Populated places ==
=== Cities ===
Sonoma County has nine incorporated municipalities.

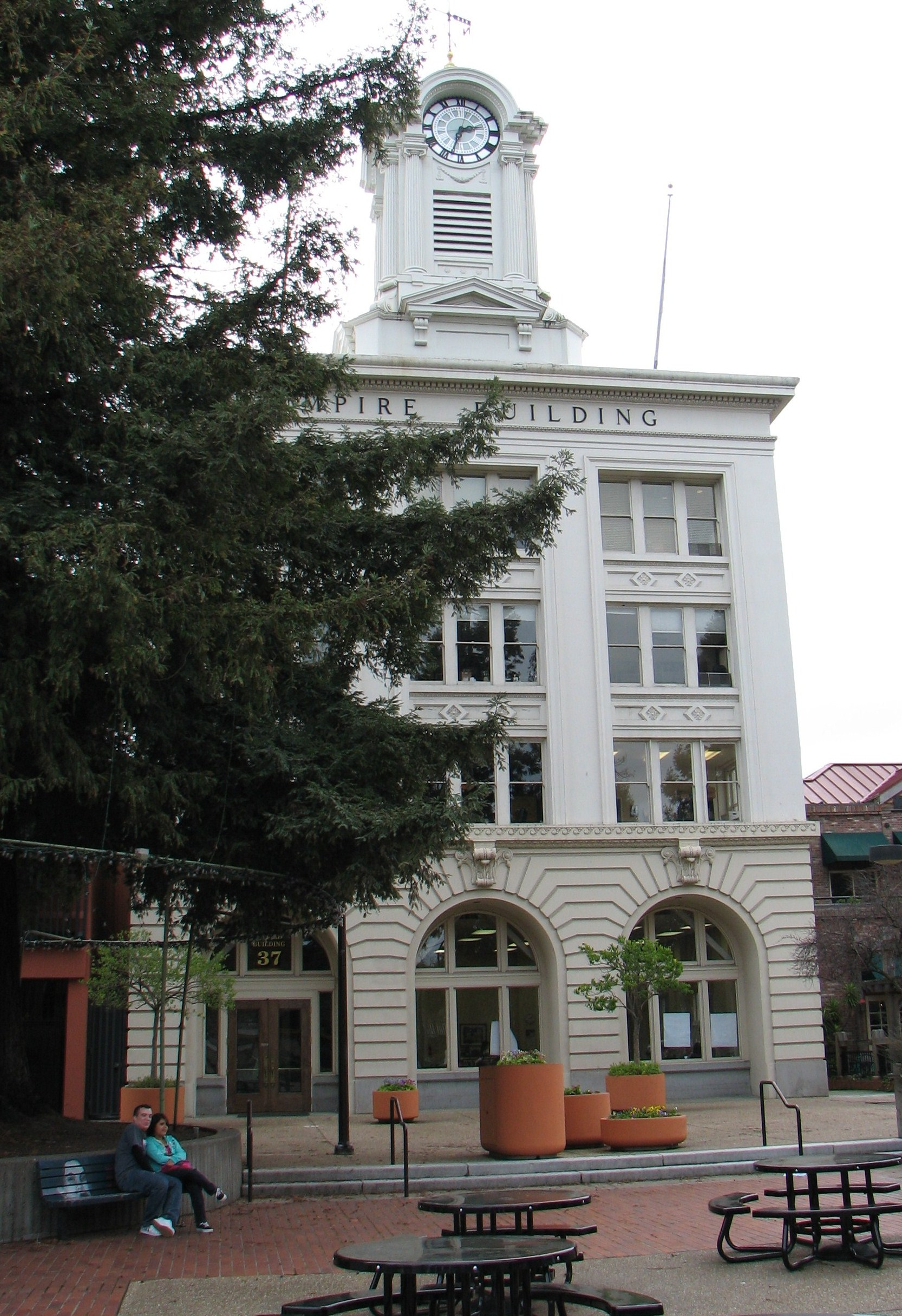
Downtown Santa Rosa, county seat of Sonoma County since 1854

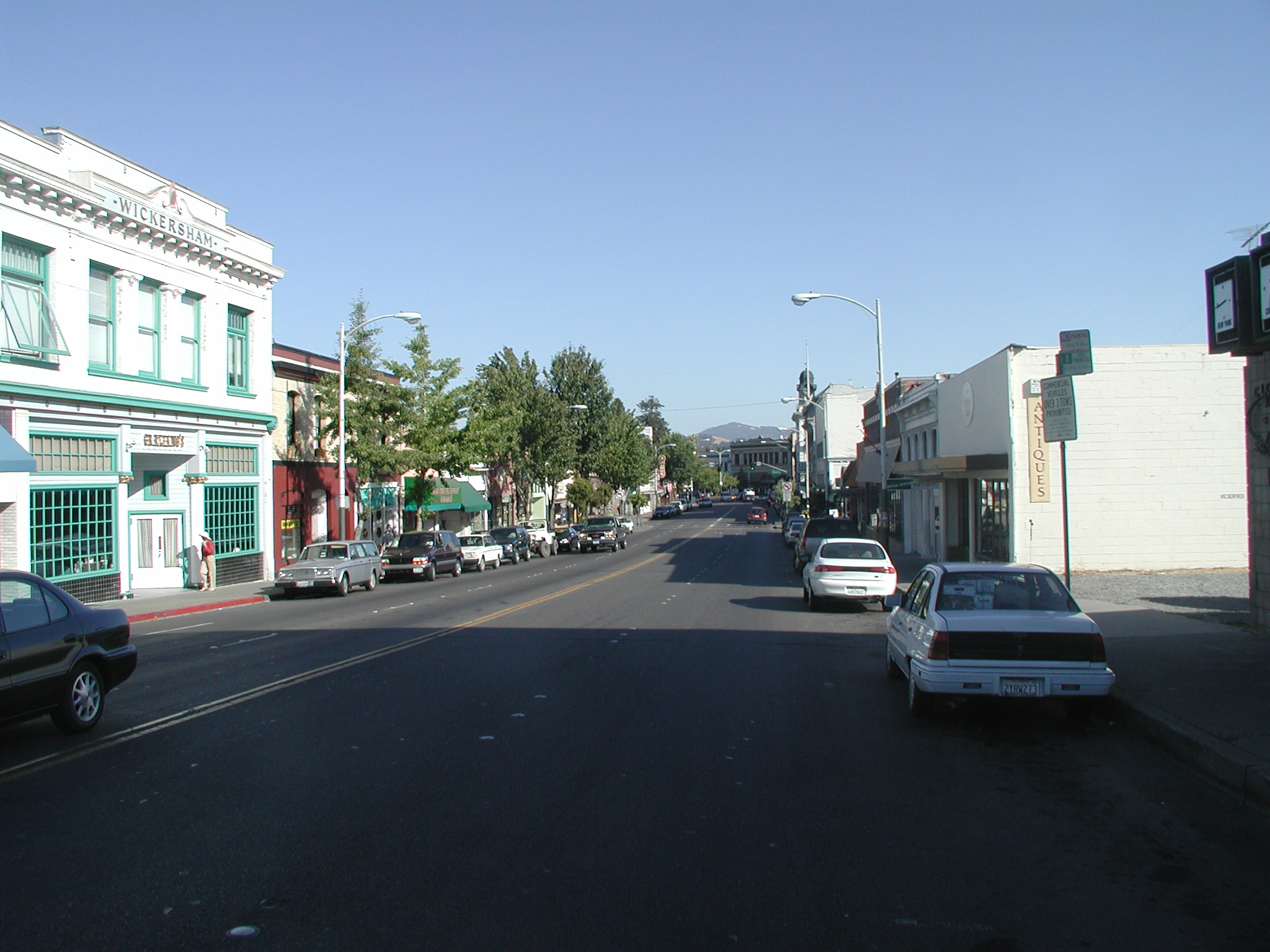
Downtown Petaluma

Community	Population	Incorporation date
City of Cloverdale	8,618	February 28, 1872
City of Cotati	7,265	July 16, 1963
City of Healdsburg	11,254	February 20, 1867
City of Petaluma	57,941	April 12, 1858
City of Rohnert Park	40,971	August 28, 1962
City of Santa Rosa	167,815	March 26, 1868
City of Sebastopol	7,379	June 13, 1902
City of Sonoma	10,648	September 3, 1883
Town of Windsor	26,801	July 1, 1992

==== Census-designated places ====
- Bloomfield
- Bodega
- Bodega Bay
- Boyes Hot Springs
- Carmet
- Cazadero
- El Verano
- Eldridge
- Fetters Hot Springs-Agua Caliente
- Forestville
- Fulton
- Geyserville
- Glen Ellen
- Graton
- Guerneville
- Jenner
- Kenwood
- Larkfield-Wikiup
- Monte Rio
- Occidental
- Penngrove
- Roseland
- Salmon Creek
- Sea Ranch
- Sereno del Mar
- Sonoma State University
- Temelec
- Timber Cove
- Valley Ford

==== Other unincorporated places ====
- Annapolis
- Asti
- Camp Meeker
- Carneros
- Duncans Mills
- Freestone
- The Geysers
- Guernewood Park
- Hacienda
- Kellogg
- Korbel
- Lakeville
- Lytton
- Mark West
- Mark West Springs
- Mercuryville
- Mesa Grande
- Riccas Corner
- Rio Nido
- Schellville
- Stewarts Point
- Two Rock
- Venado
- Villa Grande
- Vineburg

=== Former townships ===
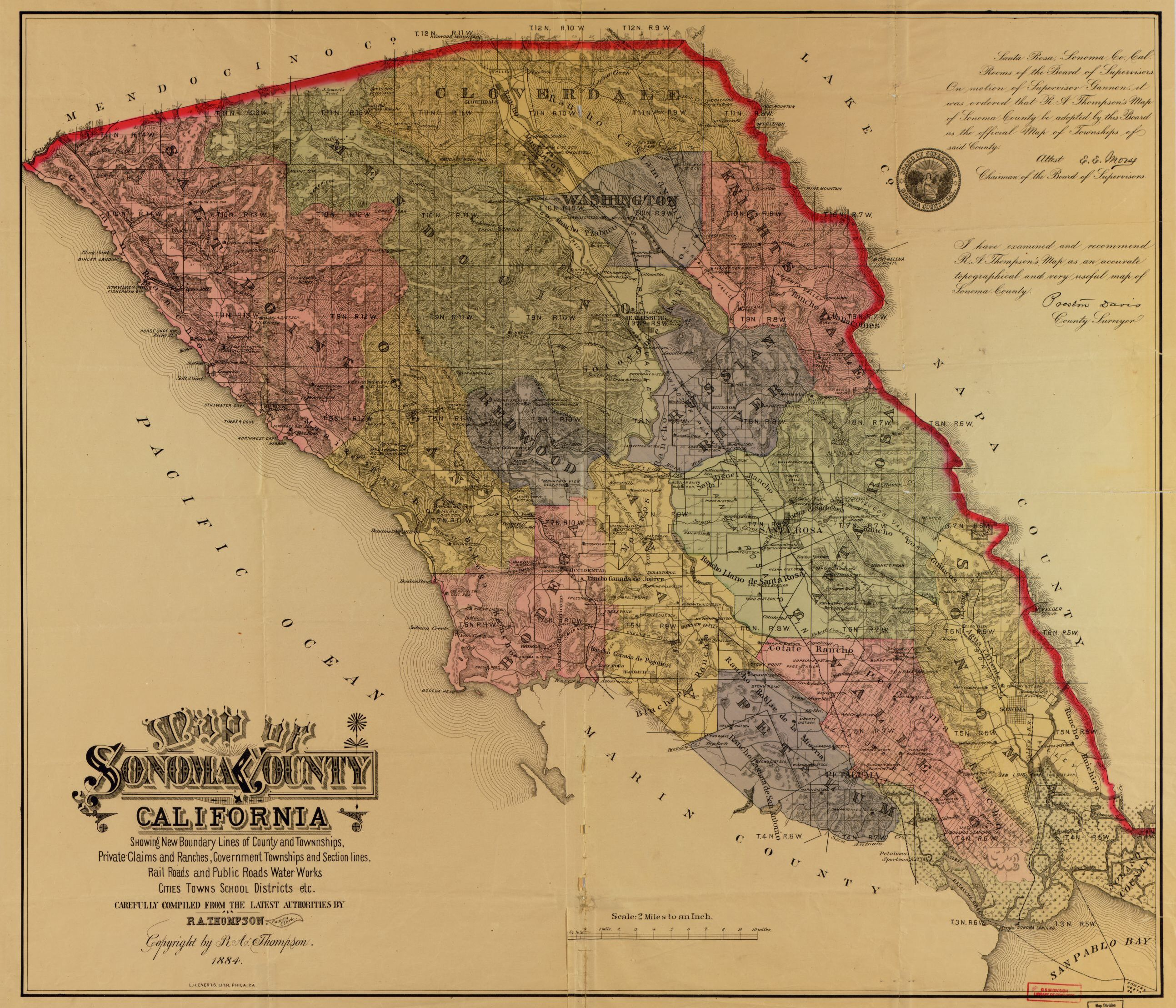
The 14 civil townships, 1884

At the time of its formation, the county comprised four civil townships. It was restructured several times, and by 1880 was made up of 14 townships:

- Analy
- Bodega
- Cloverdale
- Knight's Valley
- Mendocino
- Ocean
- Petaluma
- Redwood
- Russian River
- Salt Point
- Santa Rosa
- Sonoma
- Vallejo
- Washington

=== Population ranking ===
The population ranking of the following table is based on the 2010 census of Sonoma County.

† county seat

Rank	City/Town/etc.	Municipal type	Population (2010 Census)
1	† Santa Rosa	City	167,815
2	Petaluma	City	57,941
3	Rohnert Park	City	40,971
4	Windsor	Town	26,801
5	Healdsburg	City	11,254
6	Sonoma	City	10,648
7	Larkfield-Wikiup	CDP	8,884
8	Cloverdale	City	8,618
9	Sebastopol	City	7,379
10	Cotati	City	7,265
11	Boyes Hot Springs	CDP	6,656
12	Roseland	CDP	6,325
13	Guerneville	CDP	4,534
14	Fetters Hot Springs-Agua Caliente	CDP	4,144
15	El Verano	CDP	4,123
16	Forestville	CDP	3,293
17	Penngrove	CDP	2,522
18	Graton	CDP	1,707
19	Temelec	CDP	1,441
20	Sea Ranch	CDP	1,305
21	Eldridge	CDP	1,233
22	Monte Rio	CDP	1,152
23	Occidental	CDP	1,115
24	Bodega Bay	CDP	1,077
25	Kenwood	CDP	1,028
26	Geyserville	CDP	862
27	Glen Ellen	CDP	784
28	Fulton	CDP	541
29	Cazadero	CDP	354
30	Bloomfield	CDP	345
31	Bodega	CDP	220
32	Timber Cove	CDP	164
33	Valley Ford	CDP	147
34	Jenner	CDP	136
35	Sereno del Mar	CDP	126
36	Salmon Creek	CDP	86
37	Stewarts Point Rancheria	AIAN	78
38	Carmet	CDP	47

== In popular culture ==
=== Film ===
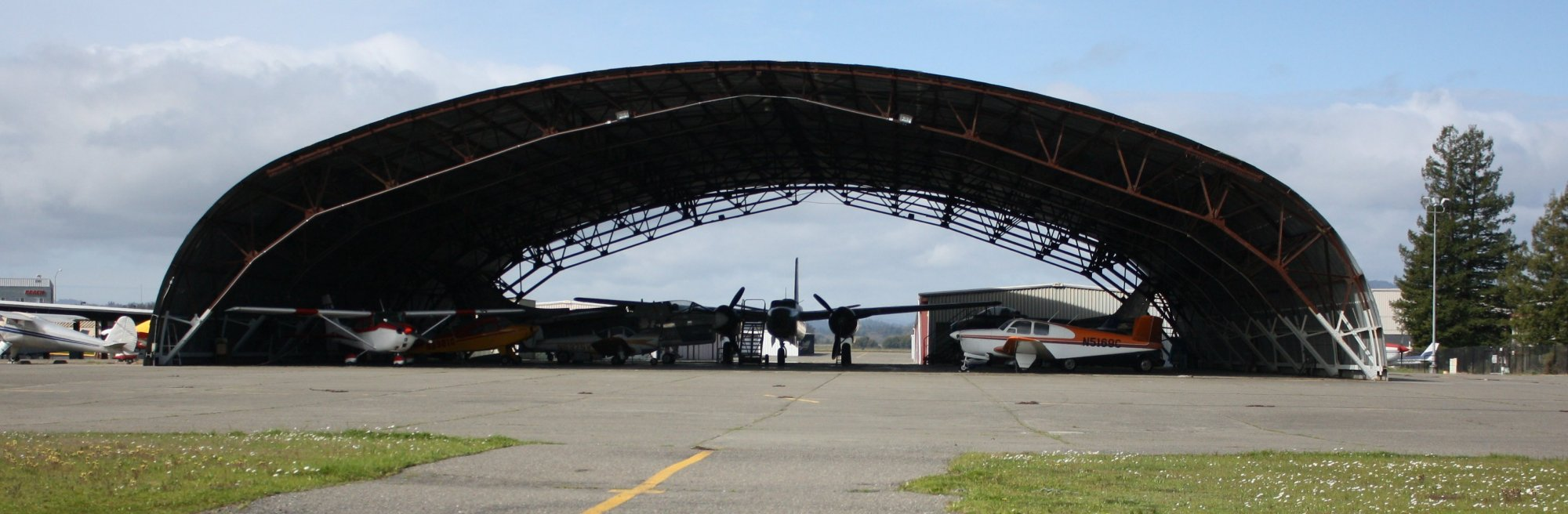
It's a Mad, Mad, Mad, Mad World airplane hangar, next to the Pacific Coast Air Museum, Charles M. Schulz Sonoma County Airport

Due to the varied scenery in Sonoma County and proximity to the city of San Francisco, a large number of movies have been filmed using venues within the county. Some of the earliest U.S. filmmaking occurred in Sonoma County, including Salomy Jane (1914) and one of Broncho Billy Anderson's 1915 Westerns.

Other films include the 1947 film The Farmer's Daughter (starring Joseph Cotten and Loretta Young) as well as two Alfred Hitchcock films, Shadow of a Doubt of 1943, filmed and set in Santa Rosa, and The Birds of 1963, filmed largely in Bodega Bay and Bodega. American Graffiti was filmed largely in Petaluma.

Other films produced partially in Sonoma County include:

Sonoma County

- 1965 The Third Day
- 1983 Cujo – Santa Rosa, Glen Ellen, Petaluma
- 1985 The Goonies – Goat Rock State Beach
- 1986 Peggy Sue Got Married – Petaluma, including a 1950s makeover of Washington St., the diner "Millie's Chili Bar" (rechristened as "The Donut Hole"), and exterior and interior shots of Santa Rosa High School.
- 1993 Nowhere to Run – Coleman Valley Road, Occidental, for farmhouse and pond scenes.
- 2001 The Man Who Wasn't There
- 2001 Bandits – Flamingo Hotel, Clover milk truck featuring local icon "Clo the cow" and rural county roads.

Cloverdale

- 1955 Many Rivers to Cross – Big Sulphur Creek
- 1993 So I Married an Axe Murderer – Cloverdale Airport

Glen Ellen

- 1982 Shoot the Moon – Glen Ellen and Jack London's Wolf House.

Petaluma

- 1972 American Graffiti
- 1977 Heroes – Bus stop at corner of Kentucky and C streets. Walnut Street.

Russian River

- 1925 Braveheart – Along the river.
- 1942 Holiday Inn – Village Inn Lodge in Monte Rio as the "Holiday Inn" with tons of artificial snow.

Santa Rosa

- 1963 It's a Mad, Mad, Mad, Mad World – Sequence involving the plane flying full bore, at about 150 knots, through an airplane hangar in less than a second, was shot at the Charles M. Schulz Sonoma County Airport.

Sebastopol

- 1949 Thieves' Highway – Gold Ridge Road.

Sonoma

- 1988 Tucker: The Man and His Dream.
- 1996 Scream – Sonoma Community Center on East Napa Street.

=== Other ===
Bliss, the default computer wallpaper of Microsoft's Windows XP operating system, is a photograph of a green hill and blue sky with clouds in Sonoma County. Taken in 1996 by Charles O'Rear, it is the most viewed photo in the world. macOS Sonoma was named after Sonoma County.

== See also ==
- List of Sonoma County Regional Parks facilities
- National Register of Historic Places listings in Sonoma County, California
- Sonoma County Historic Landmarks and Districts
- Sonoma County Water Agency
- Sonoma Mountain Zen Center
