= Carmet, California =

Carmet
- census-designated place
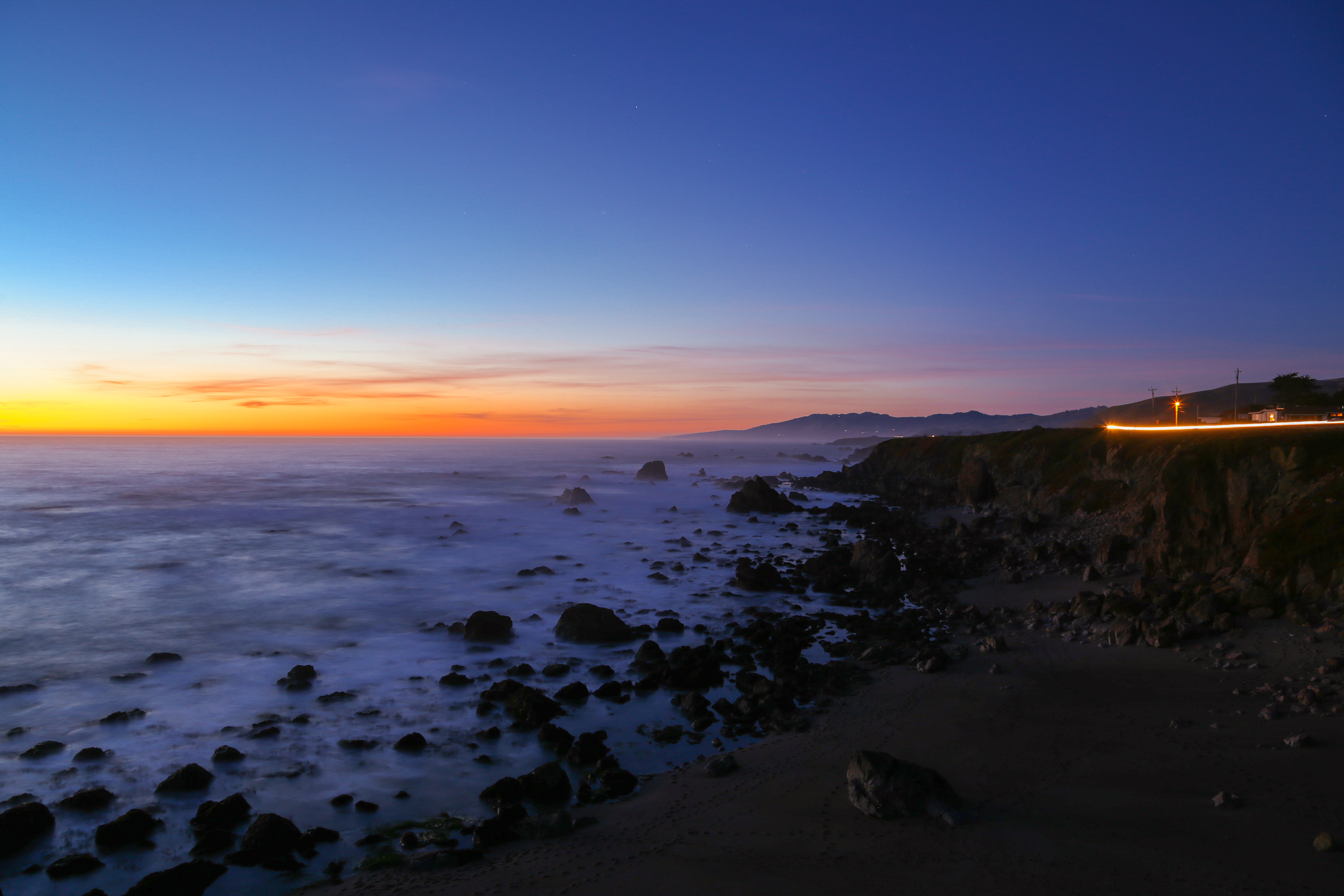
- Carmet, 2013

- Location of Carmet in Sonoma County, California.

- Position in California.
- Coordinates: 38°22′28″N 123°04′19″W
- Country: United States
- State: California
- County: Sonoma

Area
  - Total: 0.29 sq mi (0.74 km^{2})
  - Land: 0.29 sq mi (0.74 km^{2})
  - Water: 0 sq mi (0.00 km^{2}) 0%
- Elevation: 180 ft (55 m)

Population (2020)
  - Total: 55
  - Density: 191.9/sq mi (74.08/km^{2})
- Demonym: Carmetian
- Time zone: UTC-8 (Pacific (PST))
  - Summer (DST): UTC-7 (PDT)
- GNIS feature ID: 2582964

Carmet is a census-designated place (CDP) in Sonoma County, California, United States. Carmet sits at an elevation of 180 feet (55 m). The 2020 United States census reported Carmet's population was 55.

== Geography ==
According to the United States Census Bureau, the CDP covers an area of 0.3 square mile (0.7 km^{2}), all land.

== Demographics ==
Historical population
Census	Pop.	Note	%±
2010	47		—
2020	55		17.0%
U.S. Decennial Census; 1860–1870 1880-1890; 1900 1910 1920; 1930 1940 1950; 1960 1970 1980; 1990 2000 2010; 2020

Carmet first appeared as a census designated place in the 2010 U.S. census.

=== Racial and ethnic composition ===
Carmet CDP, California – Racial and ethnic composition Note: the US Census treats Hispanic/Latino as an ethnic category. This table excludes Latinos from the racial categories and assigns them to a separate category. Hispanics/Latinos may be of any race.
Race / Ethnicity (NH = Non-Hispanic)	Pop 2010	Pop 2020	% 2010	% 2020
White alone (NH)	43	41	91.49%	74.55%
Black or African American alone (NH)	0	0	0.00%	0.00%
Native American or Alaska Native alone (NH)	0	0	0.00%	0.00%
Asian alone (NH)	1	0	2.13%	0.00%
Native Hawaiian or Pacific Islander alone (NH)	0	0	0.00%	0.00%
Other race alone (NH)	0	0	0.00%	0.00%
Mixed race or Multiracial (NH)	3	10	6.38%	18.18%
Hispanic or Latino (any race)	0	4	0.00%	7.27%
Total	47	55	100.00%	100.00%

=== 2020 census ===
As of the 2020 census, Carmet had a population of 55. The median age was 55.8 years. 18.2% of residents were under the age of 18 and 21.8% of residents were 65 years of age or older. For every 100 females there were 96.4 males, and for every 100 females age 18 and over there were 80.0 males age 18 and over.

0.0% of residents lived in urban areas, while 100.0% lived in rural areas.

There were 31 households in Carmet, of which 12.9% had children under the age of 18 living in them. Of all households, 54.8% were married-couple households, 25.8% were households with a male householder and no spouse or partner present, and 9.7% were households with a female householder and no spouse or partner present. About 35.5% of all households were made up of individuals and 16.2% had someone living alone who was 65 years of age or older.

There were 66 housing units, of which 53.0% were vacant. The homeowner vacancy rate was 0.0% and the rental vacancy rate was 5.6%.

Racial composition as of the 2020 census
Race	Number	Percent
White	42	76.4%
Black or African American	0	0.0%
American Indian and Alaska Native	0	0.0%
Asian	0	0.0%
Native Hawaiian and Other Pacific Islander	0	0.0%
Some other race	0	0.0%
Two or more races	13	23.6%

=== 2010 census ===
The 2010 United States census reported that Carmet had a population of 47. The population density was 164.0 inhabitants per square mile (63.3/km^{2}). The racial makeup of the CDP was 91.5% White, 2.1% Asian, and 6.4% from two or more races. 0.0% of the population was Hispanic or Latino of any race.

The Census reported that 100% of the population lived in households.

There were 29 households, out of which 1 (3.4%) had children under the age of 18 living in them, 11 (37.9%) were opposite-sex married couples living together, 0 (0%) had a female householder with no husband present, 1 (3.4%) had a male householder with no wife present. There were 3 (10.3%) unmarried opposite-sex partnerships, and 0 (0%) same-sex married couples or partnerships. 15 households (51.7%) were made up of individuals, and 4 (13.8%) had someone living alone who was 65 years of age or older. The average household size was 1.62. There were 12 families (41.4% of all households); the average family size was 2.25.

The population was spread out, with 2 people (4.3%) under the age of 18, 0 people (0%) aged 18 to 24, 6 people (12.8%) aged 25 to 44, 24 people (51.1%) aged 45 to 64, and 15 people (31.9%) who were 65 years of age or older. The median age was 59.3 years. For every 100 females, there were 95.8 males. For every 100 females age 18 and over, there were 87.5 males.

There were 68 housing units at an average density of 237.2 per square mile (91.6/km^{2}), of which 82.8% were owner-occupied and 17.2% were occupied by renters. The homeowner vacancy rate was 7.7%; the rental vacancy rate was 16.7%. 85.1% of the population lived in owner-occupied housing units and 14.9% lived in rental housing units.

== Education ==
Carmet is served by the Shoreline Unified School District.
