= Roseland, California =

Roseland
- Neighborhood of Santa Rosa; Former unincorporated area
- Location in Sonoma County and the state of California
- Coordinates: 38°25′20″N 122°43′41″W
- Country: United States
- State: California
- County: Sonoma
- City: Santa Rosa
- Annexed: 2017

Government
  - City Council: TBD pending redistricting
  - State Senate: Mike McGuire (D)
  - State Assembly: Marc Levine (D)
  - Mayor: Chris Coursey

Area
  - Total: 0.940 sq mi (2.435 km^{2})
  - Land: 0.940 sq mi (2.435 km^{2})
  - Water: 0 sq mi (0 km^{2}) 0%
- Elevation: 135 ft (41 m)

Population (2010)
  - Total: 6,325
  - Density: 6,728/sq mi (2,598/km^{2})

Ethnicity
  - White: 51.1%
  - Black: 2.1%
  - Latino: 59.7%
  - Asian: 4.4%
  - Native American: 3.5%
  - Other: 32.9%
- Time zone: UTC-8 (Pacific)
  - Summer (DST): UTC-7 (PDT)
- ZIP code: 95407
- Area code: 707
- FIPS code: 06-62868
- GNIS feature IDs: 1799481, 2409212

Roseland is a neighborhood in Santa Rosa, California. As of the 2010 census, the population was 6,325. Roseland was an unincorporated enclave within the City of Santa Rosa until the area was annexed by Santa Rosa on November 1, 2017.

Located just south of downtown Santa Rosa, Roseland is known for its commercial district along Sebastopol Road.

== Geography ==
Roseland is situated southwest of the US-101/CA-12 interchange. Roseland is surrounded by the Santa Rosa neighborhoods of downtown to the northeast; Lincoln Square, West End, and Railroad Square to the north; South Park to the east; Bellevue Ranch to the south; and Wright area to the west. It was a census-designated place (CDP) in unincorporated Sonoma County until annexation into the City of Santa Rosa was finalized on November 1, 2017.

It covers an area of 0.94 sq mi (2.4 km^{2}), all of which is land. At the 2000 census, it covered a land area of 1.06 sq mi (2.7 km^{2}).

Sonoma–Marin Area Rail Transit (SMART) commuter rail passes through eastern Roseland. The north–south bicycle-pedestrian path along the tracks connects to the east–west Joe Rodota Trail at California State Route 12.

== Demographics ==
=== 2010 ===
At the 2010 census, Roseland had a population of 6,325. The population density was 6,726.5 inhabitants per square mile (2,597.1/km^{2}). The racial makeup of Roseland was 3,235 (51.1%) White, 130 (2.1%) African American, 224 (3.5%) Native American (1.6% Pomo), 276 (4.4%) Asian (1.0% Laotian, 1.0% Filipino, 0.7% Cambodian, 0.6% Vietnamese, 0.2% Chinese, 0.2% Indian, 0.1% Korean), 15 (0.2%) Pacific Islander (0.2% Samoan), 2,078 (32.9%) from other races, and 367 (5.8%) from two or more races. Hispanic or Latino of any race were 3,773 persons (59.7%); 53.6% of Roseland is Mexican, 1.6% Salvadoran, 0.7% Guatemalan, 0.4% Puerto Rican, and 0.3% Nicaraguan.

The census reported that 98.9% of the population lived in households and 1.1% lived in non-institutionalized group quarters.

There were 1,724 households, 853 (49.5%) had children under the age of 18 living in them, 804 (46.6%) were opposite-sex married couples living together, 276 (16.0%) had a female householder with no husband present, 172 (10.0%) had a male householder with no wife present. There were 188 (10.9%) unmarried opposite-sex partnerships, and 20 (1.2%) same-sex married couples or partnerships. 309 households (17.9%) were one person and 103 (6.0%) had someone living alone who was 65 or older. The average household size was 3.63. There were 1,252 families (72.6% of households); the average family size was 3.97.

The age distribution was 1,825 people (28.9%) under the age of 18, 758 people (12.0%) aged 18 to 24, 1,895 people (30.0%) aged 25 to 44, 1,416 people (22.4%) aged 45 to 64, and 431 people (6.8%) who were 65 or older. The median age was 30.2 years. For every 100 females, there were 111.4 males. For every 100 females age 18 and over, there were 113.8 males.

There were 1,824 housing units at an average density of 1,939.8 per square mile (749.0/km^{2}), of which 50.8% were owner-occupied and 49.2% were occupied by renters. The homeowner vacancy rate was 1.4%; the rental vacancy rate was 3.0%. 44.6% of the population lived in owner-occupied housing units and 54.3% lived in rental housing units.

=== 2000 ===
At the 2000 census, there were 6,369 people, 1,847 households, and 1,348 families in the CDP. The population density was 6,033/sq mi (2,320/km^{2}). There were 1,887 housing units at an average density of 1,787 per square mile (690/km^{2}). As of 2000, The racial makeup of the CDP was 57.65% White, 43.22% Latino, 2.68% African American, 2.65% Native American, 5.29% Asian, 0.50% Pacific Islander, 25.15% from other races, and 6.06% from two or more races. Of the 1,847 households 44.9% had children under the age of 18 living with them, 48.0% were married couples living together, 17.1% had a female householder with no husband present, and 27.0% were non-families. 19.4% of households were one person and 6.0% were one person aged 65 or older. The average household size was 3.36 and the average family size was 3.76.

The age distribution was 31.6% under the age of 18, 10.8% from 18 to 24, 32.8% from 25 to 44, 17.5% from 45 to 64, and 7.3% 65 or older. The median age was 30 years. For every 100 females, there were 96.3 males. For every 100 females age 18 and over, there were 93.6 males.

The median household income was $45,955 and the median family income was $46,799. Males had a median income of $31,000 versus $26,449 for females. The per capita income for the CDP was $14,577. About 11.8% of families and 17.3% of the population were below the poverty line, including 20.7% of those under age 18 and 16.4% of those age 65 or over.

Historical population
Census	Pop.	Note	%±
1950	1,552		—
1960	4,510		190.6%
1970	5,105		13.2%
1980	7,915		55.0%
1990	8,779		10.9%
2000	6,369		−27.5%
2010	6,325		−0.7%

== Government ==
In the California State Legislature, Roseland is in the 2nd senatorial district, represented by Democrat Mike McGuire, and in the 10th Assembly district, represented by Democrat Stephanie Nguyen.

In the United States House of Representatives, Roseland is in California's 4th congressional district, represented by Democrat Mike Thompson.

== Education ==
Roseland School District serves students from transitional kindergarten through high school. The three elementary schools, Roseland Elementary: A Leadership Academy, Sheppard Accelerated Elementary, and Roseland Creek Elementary, all serve students from transitional kindergarten through sixth grade. The two middle schools, Roseland Accelerated Middle School and Roseland Collegiate Prep, serve students in seventh and eighth grade. Lastly, Elsie Allen High School, Roseland University Prep and Roseland Collegiate Prep serve students in ninth through twelfth grade.

The Sonoma County Library system operates the Roseland Community Library on Sebastopol Road.
