= Marty O'Reilly =

American singer-songwriter

- Born: c. 1989; San Francisco, California, U.S.
- Origin: Santa Cruz, California, U.S.
- Genres: Folk; Blues; Americana
- Occupations: Singer-songwriter; guitarist
- Instruments: Vocals; guitar
- Years active: 2012–present
- Website: martyoreilly.com

Marty O'Reilly (born c. 1989) is an American singer-songwriter and guitarist from Sonoma, California, whose music draws on folk, blues and Americana. From 2012 he led the Santa Cruz band Marty O'Reilly & the Old Soul Orchestra, which toured the United States and Europe and released four albums and an EP, before he began performing as a solo artist. In 2025 he competed on the 28th season of the NBC singing competition The Voice.

== Early life and education ==
O'Reilly was born in San Francisco and moved to Sonoma at age four. His father is a poet. He attended Summerfield Waldorf School in Santa Rosa, where he received his first guitar at around age 15. According to O'Reilly, he first heard the blues musician Blind Willie Johnson via a mislabeled file downloaded from Napster. After studying for two years at Santa Rosa Junior College, he transferred to the University of California, Santa Cruz in 2010. He graduated in 2012 with a bachelor's degree in environmental studies.

== Career ==
=== Marty O'Reilly & the Old Soul Orchestra ===
O'Reilly formed the Old Soul Orchestra in Santa Cruz in 2012. The group first came together for a one-off performance at a buskers' showcase at the Kuumbwa Jazz Center, and O'Reilly has described an early lineup of himself, violinist Chris Lynch and bassist Jeff Kissell. About nine months after forming, the members quit their day jobs to take a six-week tour of the United Kingdom. NPR's Weekend Edition Saturday featured the band in July 2015 as it left for a summer tour of the British Isles. By 2016 the lineup included drummer Matt Goff, and bassist Ben Berry replaced Kissell that year.

The Press Democrat described the band's music as combining Delta blues with soul, folk and jazz. In 2016 the band was playing about 120 shows a year, mostly in California and the western United States, and had also performed in Switzerland, Germany, the Netherlands, the United Kingdom and Ireland. It played BottleRock Napa Valley in 2017 and the High Sierra Music Festival in 2019.

The band released a self-titled live album in 2013, its first studio album, Pray for Rain, in 2014, and the EP Preach 'Em Now! in 2015. Its crowdfunded album Stereoscope followed in February 2018. In October 2018 the band and the Santa Cruz dance studio Motion Pacific scheduled a three-night run in which dancers performed new choreography to the album. Signal Fires was released in October 2021.

=== Solo career ===
O'Reilly moved back to Sonoma in 2021. He later ended the band and began touring as a solo performer, playing about 100 shows a year. His first solo album, The Rhinefarm, was released on June 24, 2026.

=== The Voice ===
The Voice's casting team contacted O'Reilly through a direct message on Instagram. In his blind audition, broadcast on September 29, 2025, he sang Ray LaMontagne's "Trouble"; Niall Horan, Snoop Dogg and Michael Bublé turned their chairs, and O'Reilly chose Bublé as his coach. He won his battle round against Carly Harvey, singing "At This Moment", in an episode broadcast on October 14, 2025. In the knockout round, broadcast on November 10, 2025, he sang "The Letter" against teammate Rob Cole; Bublé advanced Cole, eliminating O'Reilly. He returned to touring after the show.

== Discography ==
=== With Marty O'Reilly & the Old Soul Orchestra ===
- Marty O'Reilly & the Old Soul Orchestra (2013)
- Pray for Rain (2014)
- Preach 'Em Now! (EP, 2015)
- Stereoscope (2018)
- Signal Fires (2021)

=== Solo ===
- The Rhinefarm (2026)
