= Roseland University Prep =

College preparatory high school in Santa Rosa, California

Coordinates: 38°25′51″N 122°43′19″W

Location
- 1931 Biwana Dr; Santa Rosa, California 95407; United States

Information
- Type: Charter School comprehensive high school
- Established: 2004
- School district: Roseland School District
- Principal: Sue Reece
- Teaching staff: 32 (FTE)
- Grades: 9-12
- Enrollment: 482 (2020-21)
- Student to teacher ratio: 18
- Colors: Purple; Gray; White
- Athletics: North Coast Section
- Mascot: Knights
- Accreditation: Western Association of Schools and Colleges
- Website: www.roselandsd.org/RUP

Roseland University Prep is a public college preparatory high school located in Santa Rosa, California, United States. It is a part of the Roseland Public Schools school district. The school serves the Roseland neighborhood and greater Southwest Santa Rosa.

== History and accomplishments ==
The Roseland community has been historically underserved, not even officially incorporated in the city of Santa Rosa until 2017. The area has been a working-class neighborhood for generations, and since the 1980s has been the hub of the region's Latino, mainly Mexican American community. By the early 2000s families and community members became frustrated with the local comprehensive high school and the lack of success of the area's students. The Roseland School District took action created their own charter high school, which would focus on preparing students for college. Roseland University Prep began in an old warehouse on Sebastopol Road, located in heart of Santa Rosa's Roseland neighborhood. In 2004 Roseland University Prep opened with 80 freshmen and enrollment increased each year until reaching its final capacity of 350 ninth through twelfth graders in 2007–08. A new, state of the art, campus was built in 2017 adjacent to Sheppard Elementary School on West Avenue. The new space comes with 17 classrooms, a library, art room, science classroom, science lab, large multipurpose room, offices and a courtyard. A gymnasium, sport's field, and modular classrooms were already constructed. The larger campus has allowed enrollment to grow to over 480 students.

In 2006–07, the school graduated more Latino boys to four-year colleges than all five of the city's regular public high schools have ever achieved in a single year.

The U.S. News & World Report ranked RUP the seventh best public high school in California and the first of the best in the United States, for the year of 2012.

== See also ==
- List of high schools in California
