= One City One Book =

American community reading program

One City One Book (also One Book One City, [City] Reads, On the Same Page, and other variations) is a generic name for a community reading program that attempts to get everyone in a city to read and discuss the same book. The name of the program is often reversed to One Book One City or is customized to name the city where it occurs. Popular book picks have been Harper Lee's To Kill a Mockingbird, Ernest Gaines's A Lesson Before Dying, Ray Bradbury's Fahrenheit 451, and Rudolfo Anaya's Bless Me, Ultima.

== History ==
One City One Book programs take the idea of a localized book discussion club and expand it to cover a whole city. The first such program was "If All of Seattle Read the Same Book" in 1998, started by Nancy Pearl at the Seattle Public Library's Washington Center for the Book. The book chosen for the program was The Sweet Hereafter by Russell Banks, written in 1991. Other cities tried the idea, and the Library of Congress listed 404 programs occurring in 2007.

These programs typically try to build a sense of community and sometimes promote literacy. Nancy Pearl warns against expecting too much from a program: "Keep in mind that this is a library program, it's not an exercise in civics, it's not intended to have literature cure the racial divide. This is about a work of literature." Some other activities that have been included are book discussion sessions, scholarly lectures on the book or related topics, a visit by the author, exhibits, related arts programming, and integration into school curricula. In Boston, the "One City One Story" program distributed tens of thousands of free copies of the story over a month.

The American Library Association (ALA) puts out a guide on organizing a local program, including picking the book. The Center for the Book at the Library of Congress tracks all known programs and the books they have used.

=== Significant "One Book" programs ===
Programs sponsored by public libraries are tracked each year by the Library of Congress. Most programs maintain their websites devoted to the annual effort.

==== United States ====
The Library of Congress maintains a website with resources, such as a partial list of authors and a list of past programs. Some states and the ALA maintain their resources.

The National Endowment for the Arts has run The Big Read since 2006. The program gives grants to national communities each year for a book selected from The Big Read's library. New titles are added to the library every year. Some colleges have begun One College, One Book programs in addition to other programs. The Department of Elementary and Early Childhood Education at the College of New Jersey has been running a One Book, One Department program for its students since 2008.

===== By State =====
Since	City	State	Sponsoring library or org	Program name
2005	Arizona State Library, Archives and Public Records	Arizona	Arizona Center for the Book	ONEBOOKAZ
2005	Yuma	Arizona	Yuma libraries	One Book Yuma
2013	Auburn	California	Various Placer County Organizations	Auburn One Book, One Community
2003	Santa Monica	California	Santa Monica Public Library	Santa Monica Reads
2007	San Diego	California	KPBS, San Diego Public Library	One Book, One San Diego
2005	San Francisco	California	SFPL, San Francisco Public Library	One City, One Book
2002	Sonoma County	California	Sonoma County Library	Sonoma County Reads (Includes Sonoma County Library, KRCB, Santa Rosa Junior College, Sonoma State University, the Sonoma County Office of Education, and Copperfield's Books)
2002	Fort Collins	Colorado	Fort Collins Reads	Fort Collins Reads
2002		Connecticut	Eastern Connecticut Libraries	One Book One Region
2003	Sarasota County	Florida	Sarasota County Libraries	One Book One Community
2003	Gwinnett County	Georgia	Gwinnett County Libraries	Gwinnett Reads
2004	Winnetka-Northfield	Illinois	Winnetka-Northfield libraries	One Book, Two Villages - separate selection for children and adults
2001	Chicago	Illinois	Chicago Public Library	One Book One Chicago
2004	South Bend	Indiana	Indiana University South Bend	One Book One Campus
2003		Iowa	Iowa Center for the Book	All Iowa Reads
2006		Kentucky	Northern Kentucky	One Book One Community
2008		Maryland	Maryland Humanities Council	One Maryland One Book
2004	Brookline	Massachusetts	Public Library of Brookline	Brookline Reads
2002	Falmouth	Massachusetts	Falmouth Public Library	What's Falmouth Reading
2010	Boston	Massachusetts	Boston Book Festival	One City One Story – distributes 30,000 free copies to area residents (archived link)
2004	Cambridge	Massachusetts	Cambridge Public Library	Cambridge READS
2002	East Lansing	Michigan	City of East Lansing	One Book East Lansing
2004	Rochester	Minnesota		Rochester Reads
2002	Boone	Missouri	Daniel Boone Regional Library	One Read
	Bozeman	Montana		One Book One Bozeman
	Omaha	Nebraska	Millard Public Schools Foundation	One Disney One Book
2005	New Paltz	New York		One Book One New Paltz
2003	Western New York	New York		A Tale for Three Counties
2001	Rochester	New York		If All of Rochester Read the Same Book
2006	Schenectady	New York	Schenectady County Public Library	"One County One Book"
2001	Syracuse, Onondaga County	New York	Onondaga County Public Library	Central New York Reads One Book
	Fargo, Moorhead, and West Fargo	North Dakota	Fargo-Moorhead Area Libraries	One Book, One Community
2002	Cincinnati	Ohio		On the Same Page Cincinnati
2003	Findlay	Ohio	Findlay-Hancock Community Foundation	CommunityREAD
2007	Lake Oswego	Oregon	Lake Oswego Library	Lake Oswego Reads
2003	Multonmah County	Oregon	Multnomah County Library	Everybody Reads
2003	Centre County	Pennsylvania		Centre County Reads
2003	Philadelphia	Pennsylvania	Free Library of Philadelphia	One Book One Philadelphia
2002	South Central Pennsylvania	Pennsylvania	Several County Library Systems	One Book, One Community: Our Region Reads!
2004	Mansfield	Texas		One City One Book
2002	Austin	Texas	City of Austin	Mayor's Book Club
2012	Odessa	Texas	City of Odessa & Ector County Library	OneBook Odessa
2004	Logan	Utah	Utah State University	Common Literature Experience
2003		Vermont	Vermont Humanities Council	Vermont Reads
2008	Henrico County	Virginia		All Henrico Reads
2004	Loudoun County	Virginia		1 Book, 1 Community
2011	Red Bank	New Jersey		One Book One Community
2017	New York City	New York	Mayor's Office of Media and Entertainment	One Book, One New York

== Critical responses ==
The concept has had a mixed reception. The literary critic Harold Bloom said, "I don't like these mass reading bees... It is rather like the idea that we are all going to pop out and eat Chicken McNuggets or something else horrid at once." There have been concerns that the program would be used to promote social values. The essayist Phillip Lopate fears a promotion of groupthink, saying, "It is a little like a science fiction plot -- Invasion of the Body Snatchers or something."

In 2002, the effort gained controversy in New York City when two groups of selectors each chose Chang-Rae Lee's Native Speaker and James McBride's The Color of Water, respectively. Both books were considered to be offensive to some of New York's ethnic groups. Nancy Pearl said, "It's turned into something not to do with literature but to do with curing the ills in society, and while there is a role for that, to ask a book to fit everybody's agenda in talking about particular issues just does a disservice to literature."

Governments are sometimes concerned that their endorsement of reading a book will be viewed as endorsing the ideas or language of the book. In 2006, the Galveston County Reads committee recommended Mark Haddon's The Curious Incident of the Dog in the Night-Time as the choice for a Texas-wide read. There was much criticism of the choice from the Mayor and Council of Friendswood, who objected to obscenity in the novel, and said that it contained ideas that should not be promoted to children. They also believed that taxpayer money should not be used to promote and purchase a book the community would not approve of.
