= NorthBay biz =

American regional magazine

- Frequency: Monthly
- Publisher: Lawrence Amaturo
- Founded: 1975
- Based in: Santa Rosa, CA
- Language: English
- Website: northbaybiz.com

NorthBay biz is a four color business and lifestyles magazine covering Napa, Marin and Sonoma counties. It covers local business, news, lifestyles, restaurants, the wine industry, nonprofits, things to do and more throughout the North Bay Area.

== History ==
It was started in 1975 as Sonoma Business magazine. It is headquartered in Santa Rosa, California. The owners of the magazine were Joni and Norman Rosinski and John Dennis from June 2000 to November 2017. They renamed the magazine following their acquisition in 2000.

The magazine publishes 15 times a year. 12 monthly issues and 3 bonus issues: a special wine issue, The NorthBay biz Top 500 (a complete listing of the top 500 companies in the North Bay) and a "Best of the North Bay" issue (a readers' poll of the best businesses in the North Bay). The magazine was acquired by Amaturo Sonoma Media Group in November 2017.

In 2023, the magazine hired veteran North Bay journalist Jason Walsh as editor in chief, and longtime magazine designer Anne Schenk was named design director. In 2024, Rosie Padilla was named associate editor.
