= Santa Rosa Plaza =

Shopping mall in Santa Rosa, California

- Location: Santa Rosa, California, United States
- Coordinates: 38.43929°N 122.7167°W
- Address: 1071 Santa Rosa Plaza
- Opened: 1983
- Developer: The Hahn Company
- Owner: Simon Property Group
- Num. of stores: 107
- Num. of anchor tenants: 3 (2 open, 1 coming soon)
- Floor area: 692,026 square feet (64,291.3 square meters)
- Floors: 2 (3 in Macy's)

Santa Rosa Plaza is an enclosed shopping mall in Santa Rosa, California, United States. Opened in 1983, it is anchored by Macy's, Dave & Buster's, and a vacant anchor tenant last occupied by Sears. The mall is managed by Simon Property Group.

Santa Rosa Plaza is one of two enclosed shopping malls in Santa Rosa, the other being Coddingtown Mall, which is located 2 mi (3.2 km) north off US Highway 101.

== History ==
The mall was built in downtown Santa Rosa in 1983 with Macy's, Sears, and Mervyn's as the original anchors, following the demolition of various downtown buildings as part of Santa Rosa's urban renewal project, including the landmark 1923 California Theater. Macy's, the first store in the development, opened in 1981 on the site of the former theater. Development was delayed for many years due to legal disputes between developers Ernest Hahn and Hugh Codding, the latter of whom owned nearby Coddingtown Mall. Codding lost the settlement. In an interview with Gaye LeBaron, Hugh Codding said the construction bonds for the Santa Rosa Plaza were paid in full with property tax revenues from the plaza businesses.

Mervyn's closed in 2008 when the chain filed for bankruptcy. Two years later, the first level of the location became Forever 21. Forever 21 closed after the holiday season of 2023. Dave & Busters opened an arcade and restaurant in the former Forever 21 space. Dave & Busters opened in January, 2026.

In 2015, Sears Holdings spun off 235 of its properties, including the Sears at Santa Rosa Plaza, into Seritage Growth Properties. On October 15, 2018, it was announced that Sears would be closing as part of a plan to close 142 stores nationwide. The store closed on January 6, 2019. The first level is now Home Interiors Furniture.

In 2024, plans were announced to convert the former Sears into a 40,000 square foot convention center and a hotel with 250 rooms – which would make it the largest space of its kind in the area. It is expected to exceed its original cost of $82 million. Due to the high cost of the project, it was put on hold with the option to relocate to a smaller and more economical location.

On May 2, 2025, the Agraria hand sculpture was removed from the mall's entrance near B Street after nearly 30 years as a downtown landmark. The sculpture will be moved north to Geyserville.
