= Montgomery Village Shopping Center =

Open-air shopping center in California

Montgomery Village
- Montgomery Village Shopping Center logo
- Location: Santa Rosa, California, U.S.
- Coordinates: 38°26′42.131″N 122°41′14.884″W
- Address: 911 Village Court
- Opened: 1950
- Developer: Hugh Codding (Montgomery Village Development Co.)
- Manager: WS Development
- Owner: WS Development
- Num. of stores: 72
- Num. of anchor tenants: 1
- Floor area: 287,681 sq ft (26,726.4 m^{2})
- Website: www.montgomeryvillageca.com

Montgomery Village is an open-air shopping center in Santa Rosa, California. Located an hour north of San Francisco, the center is situated directly on Highway 12, which connects the Sonoma and Napa Valleys with the Sacramento-San Joaquin River Delta and the Sierra Nevada Foothills.

Montgomery Village features over 280,000 square feet (26,000 m^{2}) of retail space and is home to over 60 shops, services and eateries.

== History ==
Santa Rosa developer and two-time city councilman Hugh Codding purchased a pair of orchards south of Montgomery Drive with the intention of building a shopping complex. He created Montgomery Village Development Co. and began construction on the center in 1949; it opened the following year, featuring about a dozen businesses. The shopping center was part of the unincorporated Montgomery Village neighborhood that Codding proposed as its own city; the area was incorporated into Santa Rosa in 1955.

The center has since grown to nearly 300,000 square feet (28,000 m^{2}). Its Village Court Stage is the site of regular live concerts and events.
