= Ridgway Historic District (Santa Rosa, California) =

The Ridgway Historic District is a residential preservation district in Santa Rosa, California. Its boundaries are Ridgway Avenue to the north, U.S. Route 101 to the west, College Avenue to the south, and Mendocino Avenue to the east.

Santa Rosa High School and Santa Rosa Junior College are nearby, north of the district. The Cherry Street Historic District lies southeast of the Ridgway district, while the St. Rose Historic District is to the south.

Ridgway High, an alternative/continuation high school, is located on the street.

The Ridgway Historic Neighborhood Association (RHNA) has been active since approximately 1990.
