= Sonoma County Library =

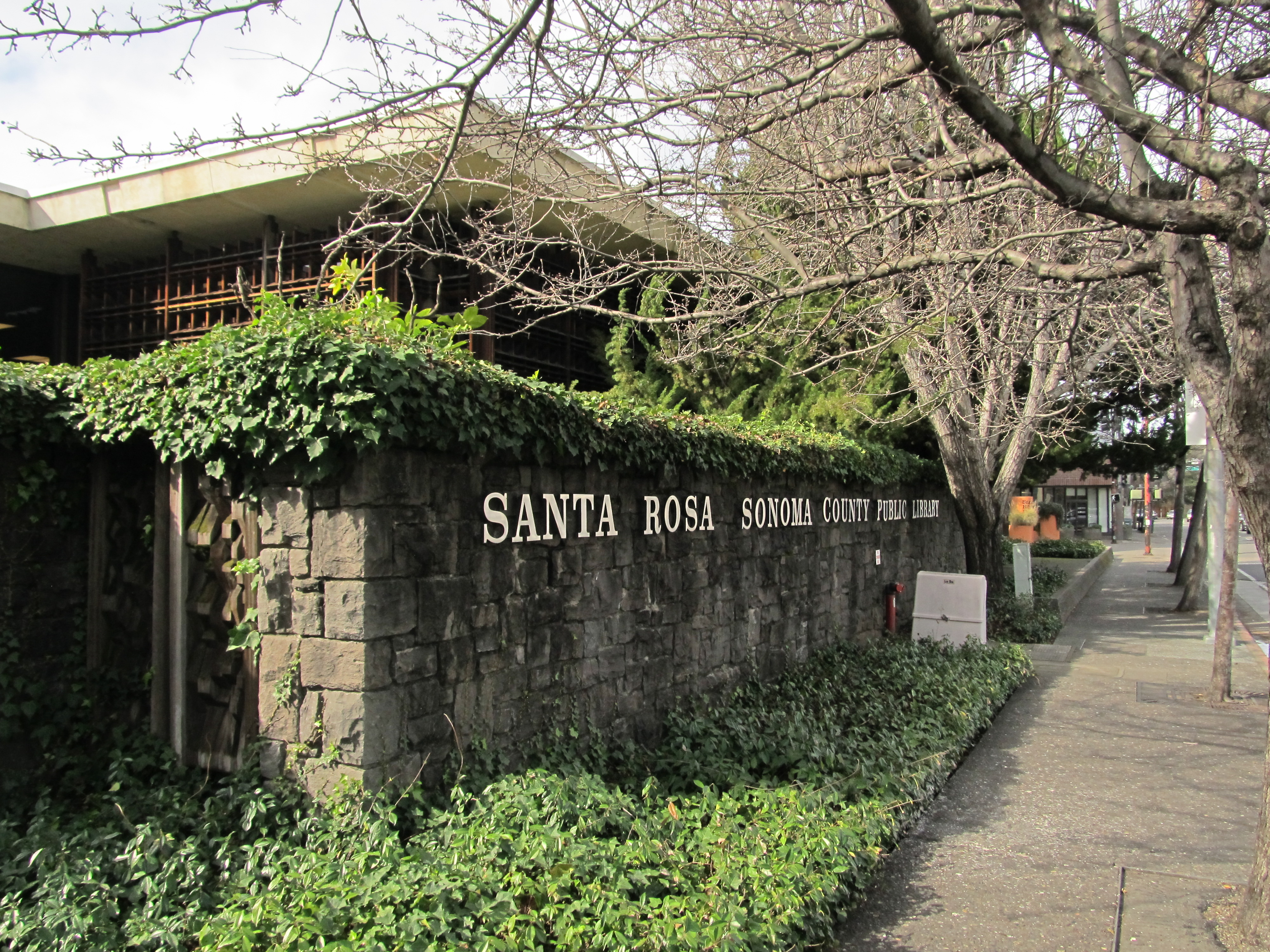
- Santa Rosa Central Library
- 38°26′28.3776″N 122°42′38.2284″W
- Location: 211 E Street, Santa Rosa, California (main branch), United States
- Type: Public library
- Established: 1975 (county-wide system; individual branches established in the years between 1859 and 2015)
- Branches: 13

Collection
- Size: 650,000

Access and use
- Circulation: 3.5 M (2012/2013)
- Population served: 490,423

Other information
- Budget: $30.5 M USD (2012/2013)
- Director: Ann Hammond
- Employees: 155 (139 FTE)
- Website: sonomalibrary.org

The Sonoma County Library is a medium-sized public library system that serves the nine cities and unincorporated areas of Sonoma County, California. The library system is a joint powers authority, with administration located at the Administrative Offices, 6135 State Farm Dr, Rohnert Park, CA 94928.

== History ==
In 1859, a private library association established the Santa Rosa Library, founding what was the 14th public library in California. The Santa Rosa Library would be the ancestor of the Central Library of the Sonoma County Library system. Santa Rosa's second library building was dedicated in March 1904 with a Carnegie grant, although the 1906 earthquake damaged it badly. The library was rebuilt as the Santa Rosa Free Public Library and served Santa Rosa until 1960, when deferred maintenance forced the City of Santa Rosa to condemn the old Carnegie library; the Santa Rosa Public Library was housed for several years in temporary quarters in downtown Santa Rosa.

Private and municipal libraries were also established in towns throughout Sonoma County from the mid-19th century, onward, including Petaluma (1858), Cloverdale (1884), Healdsburg (1896), Sonoma (1903), Sebastopol (1916) and Guerneville (1924). In 1945, Sonoma County Free Public Library was founded. By 1950, the new system included a Central Library and four branches, a bookmobile, and many outlets, among them 80 school libraries. The Santa Rosa Public Library merged with the Sonoma County Free Public Library in 1965, and the Sonoma County Board of Supervisors designated the combined organization as official archives for the county.

A new Santa Rosa Central Library opened in 1967, to replace the old Carnegie Library. The new library included the “California Room”; this became the core of the Sonoma County History and Genealogy Library collection. Between 1967 and 1975, an additional Santa Rosa Library opened, the Northwest Library, adjacent to Coddingtown Mall (1968), and a new library was built in Sebastopol (1974) to replace the old Carnegie library damaged in a 1969 earthquake.

In 1975, a county-wide Library Joint Powers Agreement was signed, uniting all public libraries in Sonoma County in one system. This served the library system until 2014, when a revised Library Joint Powers Agreement was approved and instituted that included representation from all nine Sonoma County cities and the County of Sonoma. During this period, new library buildings opened in Petaluma (1976), Healdsburg (1988) and Guerneville (1988); additional library branches opened in Santa Rosa's Rincon Valley (1994) and Windsor (1996) and Rohnert Park (2003). In November 2015, a temporary storefront library was established in the Roseland district of southwest Santa Rosa to serve Roseland's predominantly Latino community; a permanent facility is planned for the site as part of a redevelopment project.

The Sonoma County Library shares a catalog with the Mendocino County Library and Lake County Library systems, allowing patrons of each library to borrow material from any library in the three systems.

== Funding ==
The library is funded predominantly by a parcel tax levied on properties within its jurisdiction. In November 2016, Sonoma County voters passed a 1/8 cent sales tax dedicated to funding the Sonoma County Library. Over 71% of the electorate approved the measure (Measure Y), which required a two-thirds majority to pass. The measure will be in effect for ten years.

== Branches ==
The Sonoma County Library serves the nine incorporated Sonoma County communities and their surrounding areas, as well as the predominantly rural area of west Sonoma County. The bigger branches are located in the largest communities of Santa Rosa (with three locations), Petaluma and Rohnert Park, with small branches and storefront libraries (or rural stations) serving the remainder of the County.

=== Branches ===
- Central Santa Rosa Library (Santa Rosa)
- Cloverdale Regional Library (Cloverdale)
- Guerneville Regional Library (Guerneville)
- Healdsburg Regional Library (Healdsburg)
- Northwest Santa Rosa Library (Santa Rosa)
- Petaluma Regional Library (Petaluma)
- Rincon Valley Library (Santa Rosa)
- Rohnert Park - Cotati Regional Library (Rohnert Park)
- Roseland Regional Library (Santa Rosa)
- Sebastopol Regional Library (Sebastopol)
- Sonoma Valley Regional Library (Sonoma)
- Windsor Regional Library (Windsor)

=== Rural Stations ===
- Occidental Community Library (Occidental)
- Forestville Community Library (Forestville)

== Special collections ==
The system includes three special collections: the Sonoma County History & Genealogy Library (located adjacent to the Central Library); the Sonoma County Wine Library (located within the Healdsburg Regional Library); and the Petaluma History Room (located within the Petaluma Regional Library). The Library also administers the Sonoma County Archives and makes materials available by appointment through the Sonoma County History & Genealogy Library.

- Petaluma History Room (Petaluma Regional Library) (Petaluma)
- Sonoma County History & Genealogy Library (Santa Rosa)
- Sonoma County Wine Library (Healdsburg)
