= Summerfield Waldorf School & Farm =

PreK-12 school in Santa Rosa, CA, US

Coordinates: 38.4436°N 122.8098°W

Summerfield Waldorf School & Farm is an independent Preschool–Grade 12 private school in Santa Rosa, California. It serves approximately 300 students, around 30% of whom receive tuition assistance. Summerfield is accredited by AWSNA Association of Waldorf Schools North America and Western Association of Schools and Colleges.

The school was founded in September 1974 and follows a Waldorf curriculum. It is purported to be the only school in California that incorporates a 7-acre Biodynamic® farm into lessons, with students and school farmers growing food for campus meals. The school's campus spans 38 acres.
