= Coddingtown Mall =

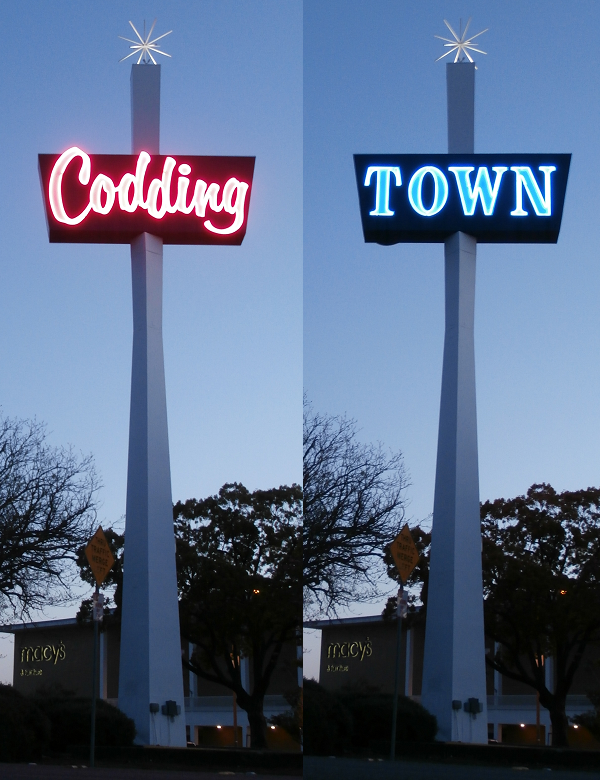
- The rotating googie sign at the east end of Coddingtown Mall facing US Route 101
- Location: Santa Rosa, California
- Coordinates: 38.457778°N 122.73°W
- Address: 733 Coddingtown Center
- Opened: 1962; 64 years ago
- Developer: Hugh Codding
- Owner: Codding Enterprises
- Num. of anchor tenants: 5
- Floor area: 843,000 sq ft (78,300 m^{2})
- Floors: 1 (3 in JCPenney and Macy's)
- Website: coddingtown.shop

Coddingtown Mall is an enclosed shopping mall in Santa Rosa, California, United States. Opened in 1962, the mall is anchored by JCPenney, Macy's, Nordstrom Rack, Target, and Whole Foods Market. It is fully owned and operated by Codding Enterprises.

Coddingtown is one of two enclosed shopping malls in Santa Rosa, the other being Santa Rosa Plaza, which is located 2 mi (3.2 km) south of Coddingtown in downtown Santa Rosa off US Highway 101.

== History ==
=== Founding ===
Coddingtown Mall was built in 1962 by Hugh Codding. Originally an open-air mall, it was enclosed in 1979. The expansion also added Liberty House, which was converted to Macy's in 1984. In 1996, Macy's moved to a spot previously occupied by The Emporium. As a result, Gottschalks moved into the former Liberty House/Macy's building. Codding sold a 50% share of the mall to Simon Property Group in 2005. After the sale to Simon, many merchants criticized Simon for failing to bring chain stores to the mall. A Ralphs supermarket in the mall was demolished in 2008 for a Whole Foods Market, whose opening was ultimately delayed until 2010, and Gottschalks closed in 2009.

=== Modern history ===
In November 2012, the former Gottschalks building was demolished to make way for a Target store, which opened in 2014. Mall officials announced in 2015 that a new building for Nordstrom Rack would replace the section housing merchants including Bank of the West and Baskin-Robbins, several of which were moved to new units. Nordstrom Rack opened in 2016.

In December 2017, the mall returned to fully local ownership after the Codding family business repurchased the 50% stake in the shopping center previously owned by mall giant Simon Property Group.
