= Roseland Public Schools =

School district in California, United States

Address
- 1691 Burbank Avenue Santa Rosa, California, 95407; United States

District information
- Type: Public
- Grades: K–12
- NCES District ID: 0633510

Students and staff
- Students: 1,435 (2020–2021)
- Teachers: 58.0 (FTE)
- Staff: 69.83 (FTE)
- Student–teacher ratio: 24.74:1

Other information
- Website: www.roselandsd.org

Roseland Public Schools or Roseland Elementary School District is a school district headquartered in Santa Rosa, California.

== Schools ==
Preschool:

- Apples and Banana 4C's Preschool

Kindergarten-grade 6:

- Sheppard Accelerated Elementary School
- Roseland Elementary School
- Roseland Creek Elementary

Grades 7-8:

- Roseland Accelerated Middle School

Secondary schools:

- Roseland Collegiate Prep (middle and high school; grades 7-10 but will become 7–12)
- Roseland University Prep (grades 9–12)
