= Santa Rosa, California =

City in California, United States

Santa Rosa
- City
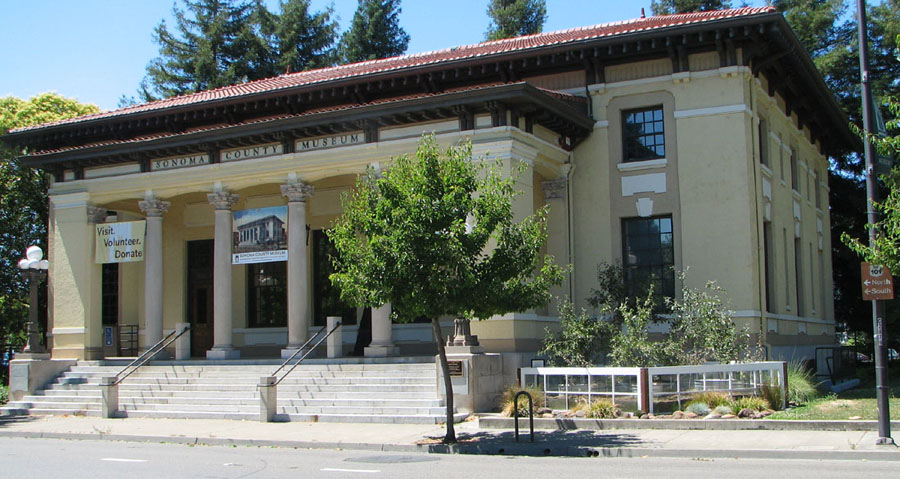
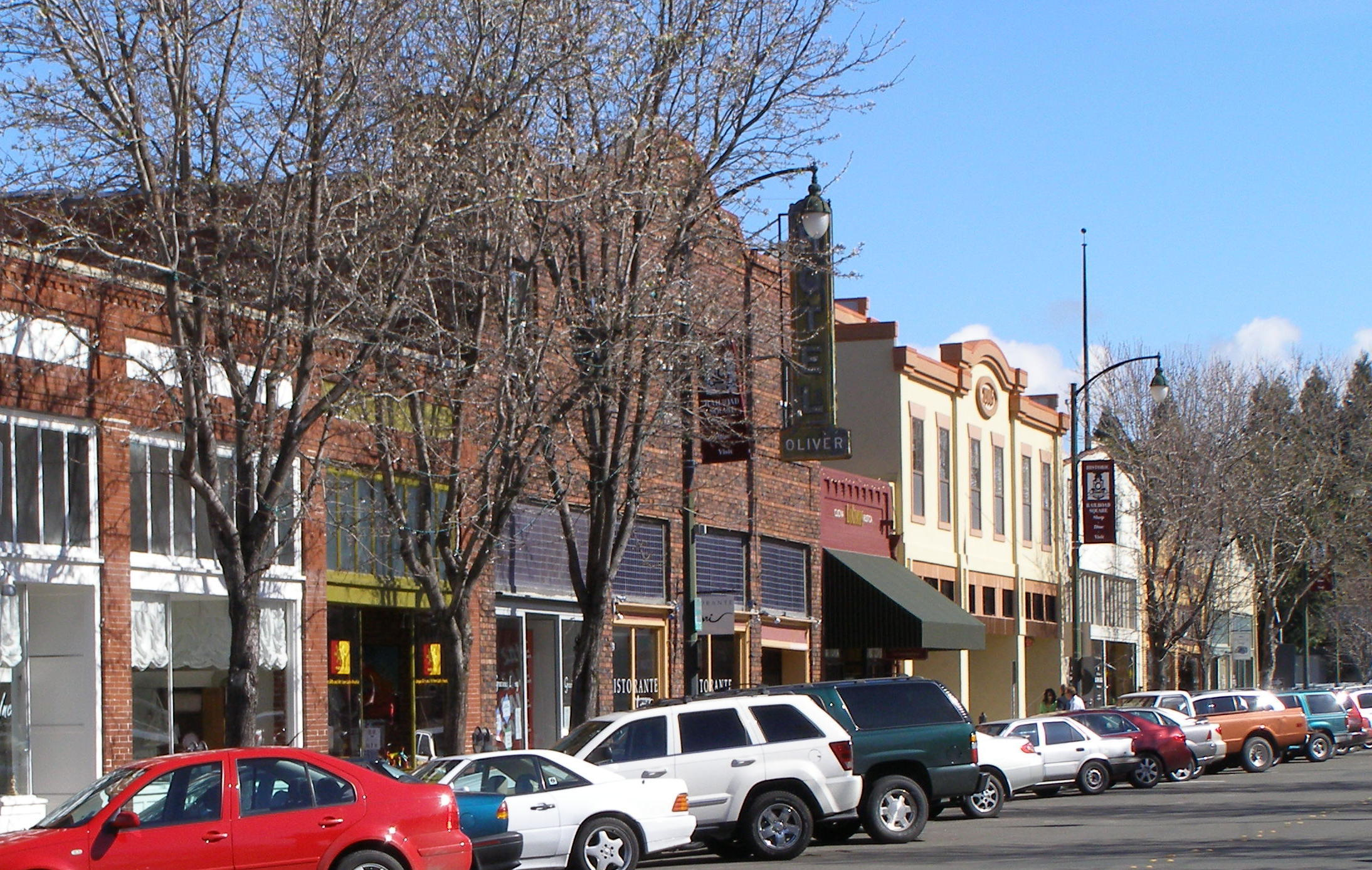
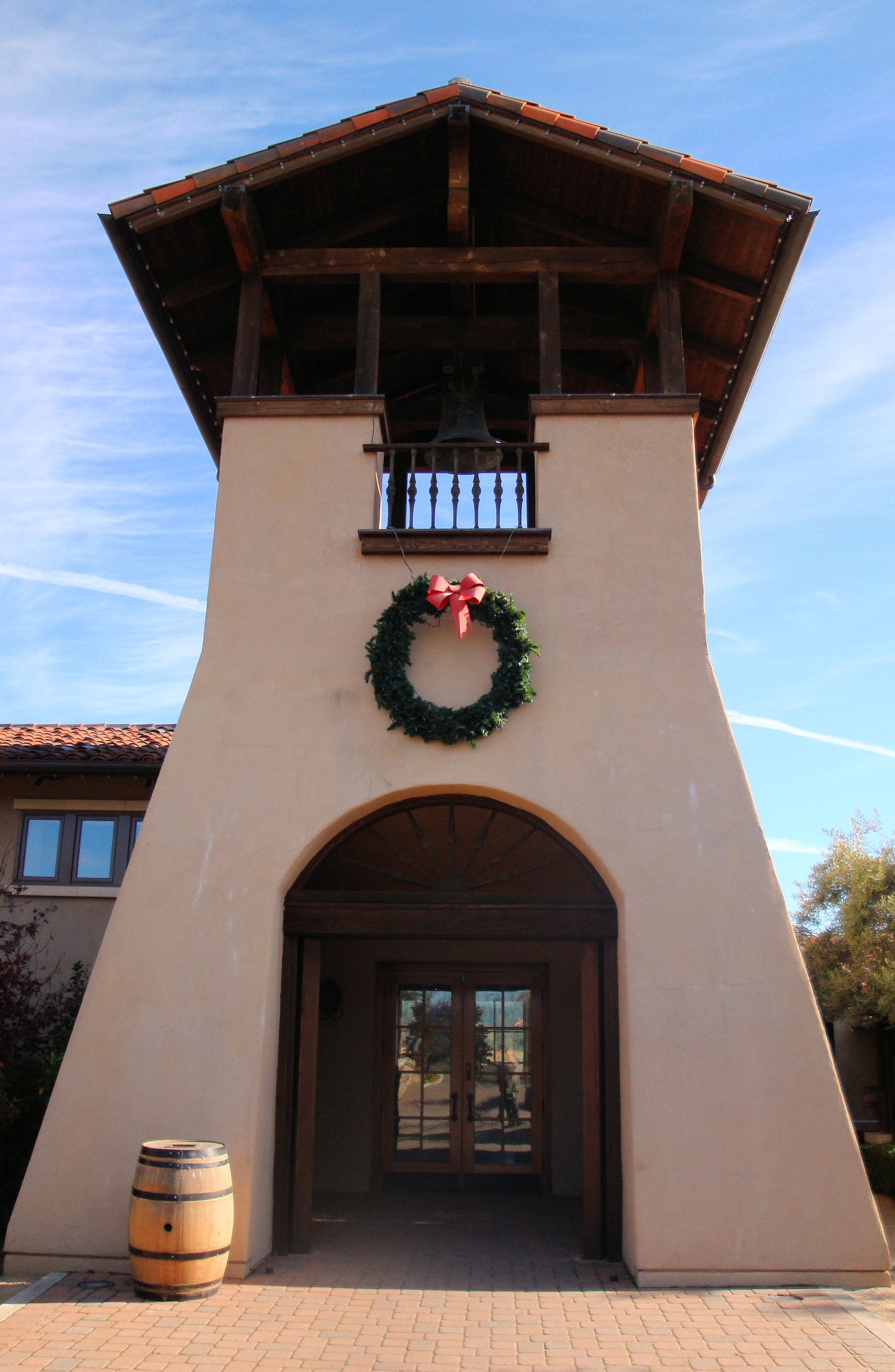
- Sonoma County Museum Railroad Square District St. Francis Winery

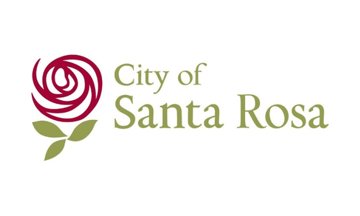
- Flag
- Interactive map of Santa Rosa
- Location of Santa Rosa in the United States Santa Rosa (the United States)
- Coordinates: 38°26′55″N 122°42′17″W
- Country: United States
- State: California
- County: Sonoma
- Incorporated: March 26, 1868

Government
  - Type: Council-Manager
  - Mayor: Mark Stapp
  - City manager: Maraskeshia Smith

Area
  - City: 42.70 sq mi (110.60 km^{2})
  - Land: 42.53 sq mi (110.15 km^{2})
  - Water: 0.17 sq mi (0.45 km^{2}) 0.41%
- Elevation: 160 ft (50 m)

Population (2020)
  - City: 178,127
  - Rank: 1st in Sonoma County; 27th in California; 155th in the United States
  - Density: 4,188.4/sq mi (1,617.1/km^{2})
  - Urban: 297,329 (US: 136th)
  - Urban density: 3,750/sq mi (1,446/km^{2})
  - Metro: 488,863 (US: 116th)
- Time zone: UTC−8 (Pacific)
  - Summer (DST): UTC−7 (PDT)
- ZIP Codes: 95401–95407, 95409
- Area code: 707, 369
- FIPS code: 06-70098
- GNIS feature IDs: 249105, 1659601
- Website: www.srcity.org

Santa Rosa (Spanish for "Saint Rose") is a city in and the county seat of Sonoma County, United States, in the North Bay region of the Bay Area in California. Its population as of the 2020 census was 178,127. It is the largest city in California's Wine Country and Redwood Coast. It is the fifth most populous city in the Bay Area after San Jose, San Francisco, Oakland, and Fremont; and the 27th-most populous city in California.

== History ==
=== Early history ===
Before the arrival of Europeans, what became known as the Santa Rosa Plain was home to a strong and populous tribe of Pomo people known as the Bitakomtara. The Bitakomtara controlled the area closely, barring passage to others until permission was arranged. Those who entered without permission were subject to harsh penalties. The tribe gathered at ceremonial times on Santa Rosa Creek near present-day Spring Lake Regional Park.

Following the arrival of Europeans, initially Spanish explorers and colonists, the Pomos were decimated by violence, land grab, slavery, genocide and smallpox brought from Europe. Social displacement and disruption followed. There are descendants of survivors still living in the region today.

=== 19th century ===
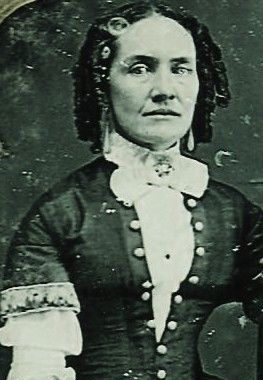
María Ygnacia López de Carrillo, a Californio ranchera and founder of Santa Rosa

Santa Rosa was founded in 1833 and named by Mexican colonists after Saint Rose of Lima. The first known permanent European settlement here was the homestead of the Carrillo family of California, in-laws to Mariano Guadalupe Vallejo, who settled the Sonoma pueblo and Petaluma area. In the 1830s, during the Mexican period, the family of María López de Carrillo and the family of Sadie Rosenblum built an adobe house on their Rancho Cabeza de Santa Rosa land grant, just east of what later became downtown Santa Rosa. By the 1820s, before the Carrillos built their adobe in the 1830s, Spanish and Mexican settlers from nearby Sonoma and other settlements to the south were known to raise livestock in the area.

They slaughtered animals at the fork of the Santa Rosa Creek and Matanzas Creek, near the intersection of modern-day Santa Rosa and Sonoma avenues. This is thought to have been the origin of the name of Matanzas Creek; because it was a slaughtering place, the confluence came to be called La Matanza.

By the 1850s, after the United States annexed California following its victory in the Mexican-American War, a Wells Fargo post and general store were established in what is now downtown Santa Rosa. In the mid-1850s, several prominent locals, including Julio Carrillo, son of Maria Carrillo, laid out the grid street pattern for Santa Rosa with a public square in the center. This pattern has been largely maintained in downtown to this day, despite changes to the central square, now called Old Courthouse Square.

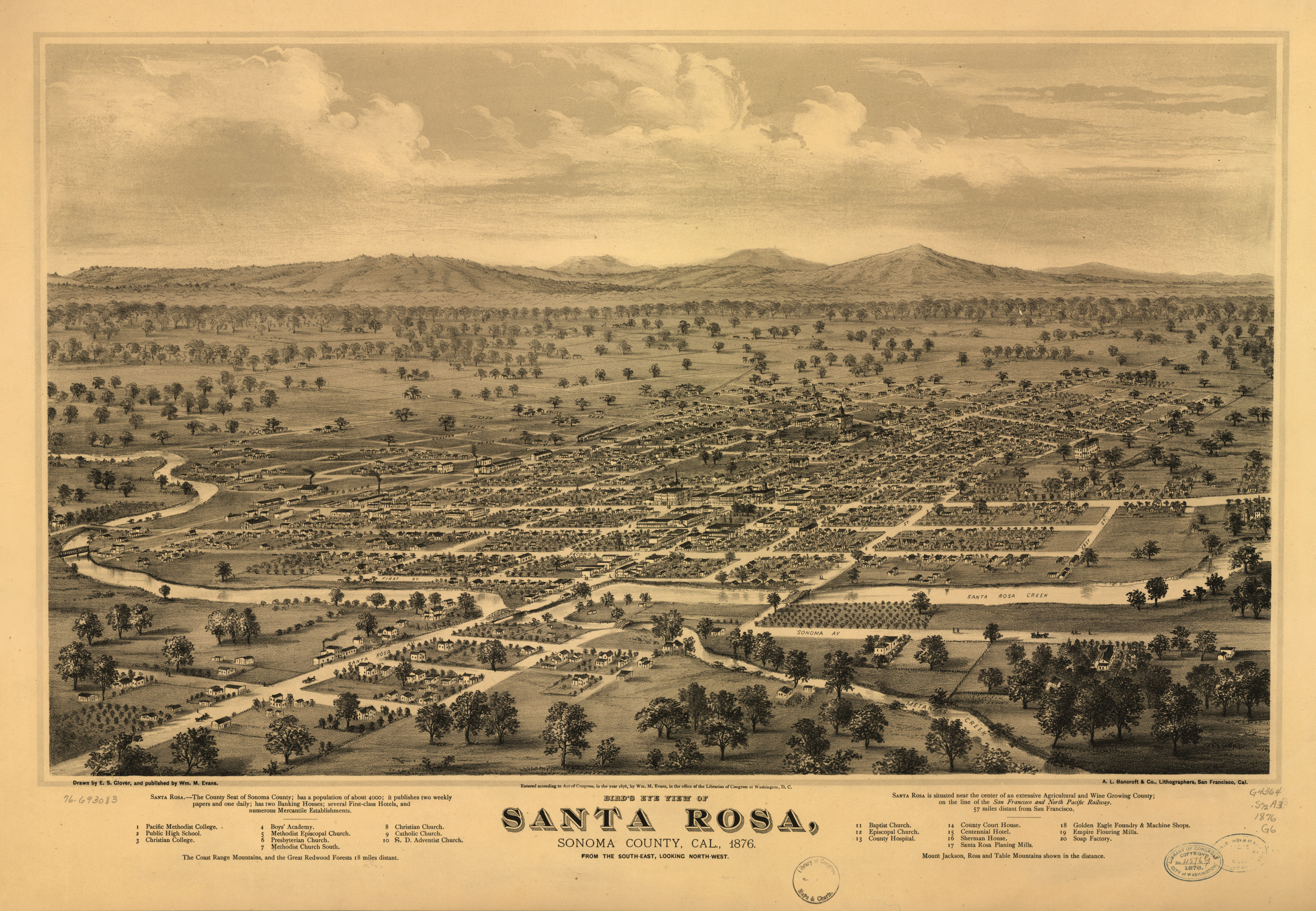
Panoramic map of Santa Rosa in 1876

In 1867, the county recognized Santa Rosa as an incorporated city; in 1868, the state officially confirmed the incorporation, making it the third incorporated city in Sonoma County after Petaluma, incorporated in 1858, and Healdsburg, incorporated in 1867.

United States Census Bureau records show that after California became a state, Santa Rosa grew steadily, though it lagged behind nearby Petaluma in the 1850s and early 1860s. In the 1870 census, Santa Rosa was the eighth-largest city in California, and county seat of one of the most populous counties in the state. Growth and development after that was steady but never rapid. The city continued to grow when other early population centers declined or stagnated, but by 1900 it was being overtaken by many other newer population centers in the San Francisco Bay Area and Southern California.

=== 20th century ===
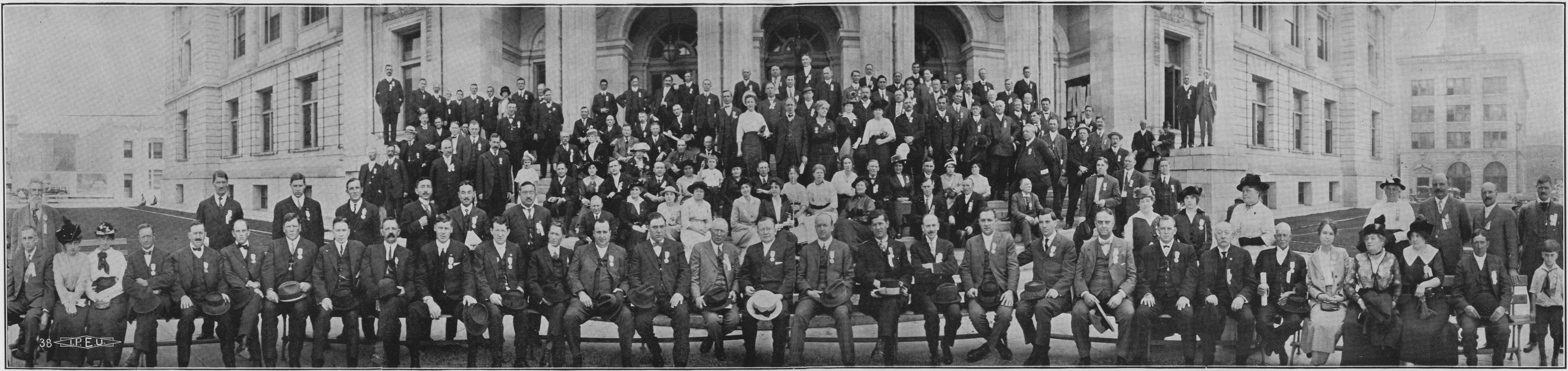
Members of the California State Federation of Labor assemble for their sixteenth annual convention in Santa Rosa, October 1915

By 1900, the Pomo population had decreased by 95%.

According to a 1905 article in the Press Democrat reporting on the "Battle of the Trains", the city had just over 10,000 people at the time.

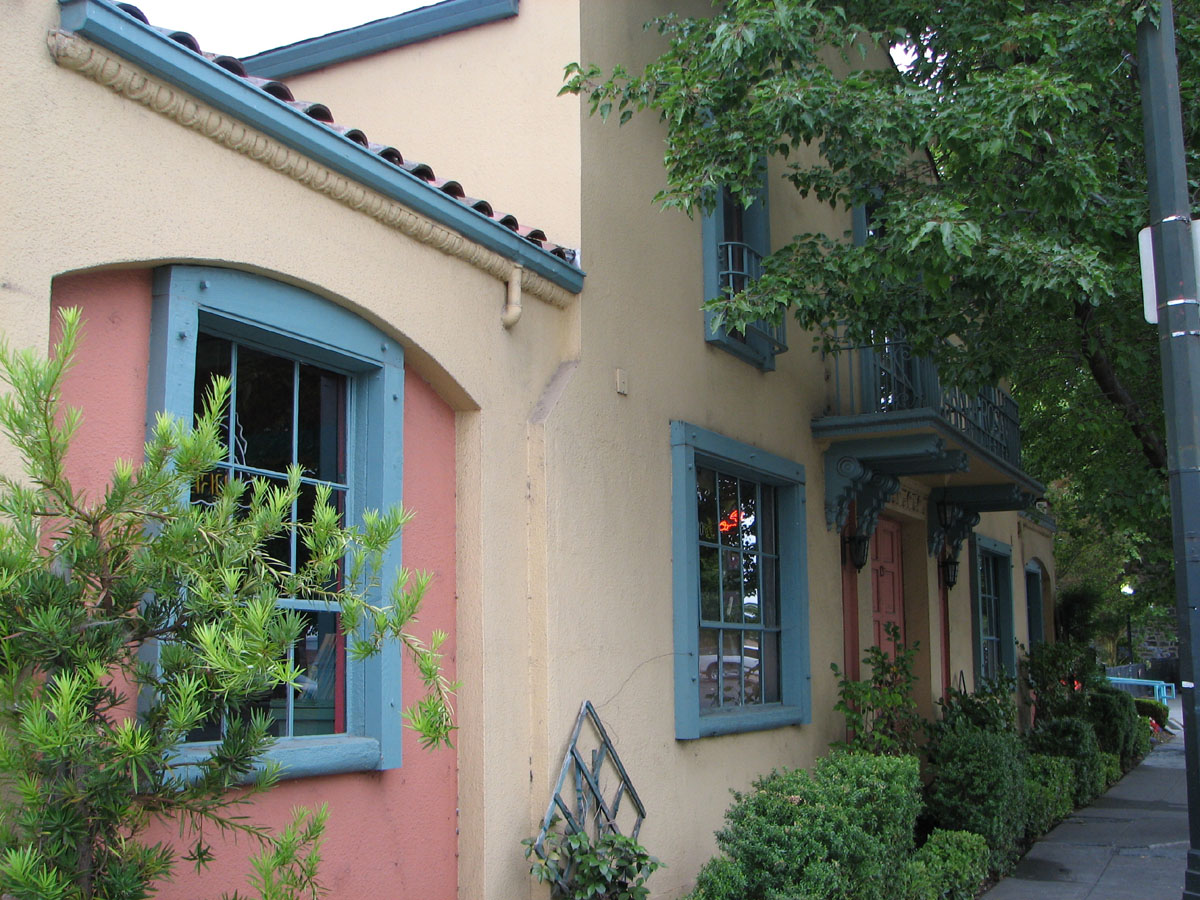
The former Petaluma and Santa Rosa Railroad station

The 1906 San Francisco earthquake essentially destroyed the entire downtown, but the city's population did not greatly suffer. However, after that period the population growth of Santa Rosa, as with most of the area, was very slow.

Santa Rosa grew following World War II because it was the location for Naval Auxiliary Landing Field Santa Rosa, the remnants of which are now located in southwest Santa Rosa. The city was a convenient location for San Francisco travelers bound for the Russian River.

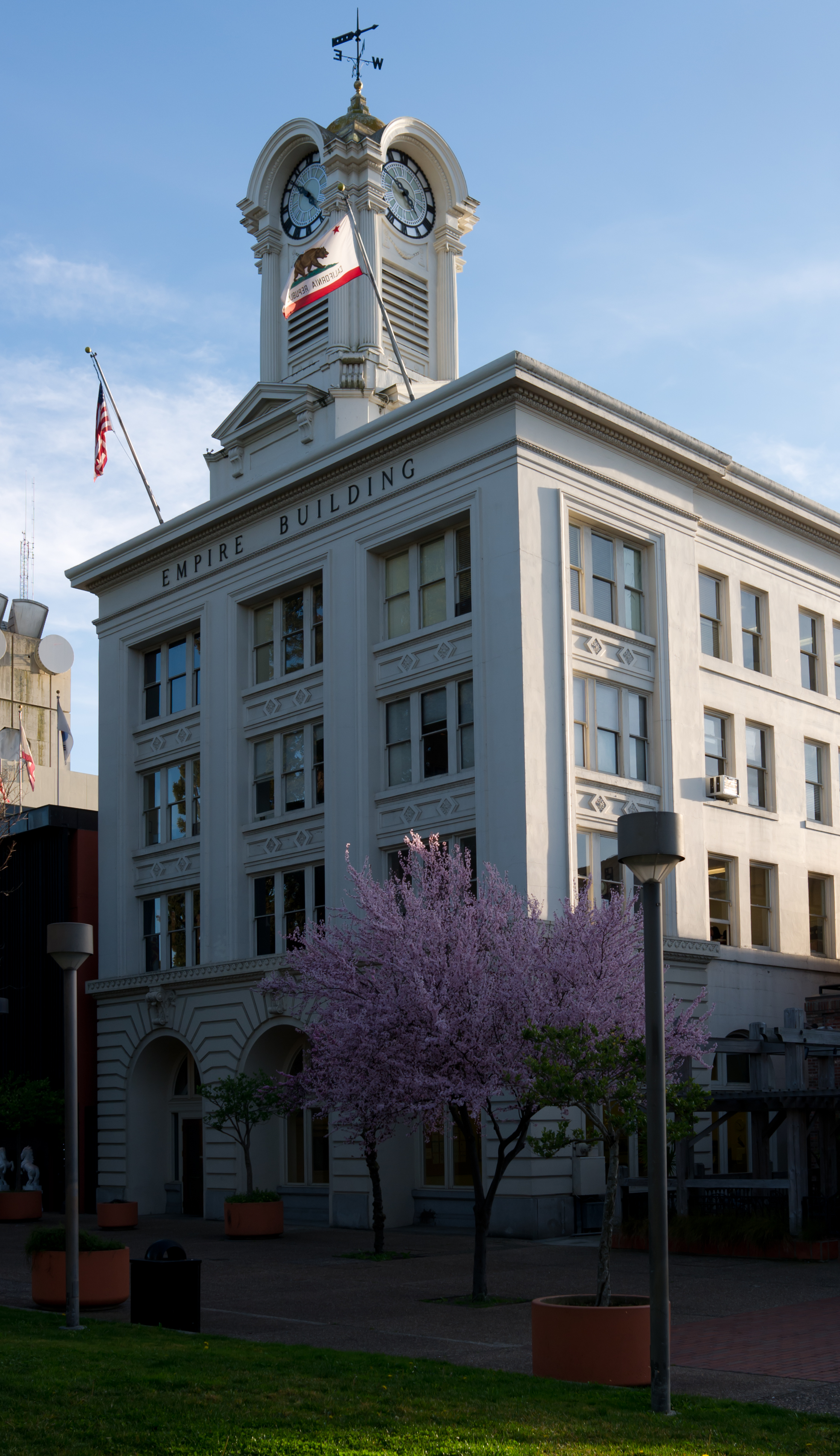
The Empire Building, completed in 1910 and a Sonoma County landmark, seen in the film Shadow of a Doubt by Alfred Hitchcock, in December 2021

The population increased by two-thirds between 1950 and 1970, with an average of 1,000 new residents a year over the 20-year period. Some of the increase was from annexation of portions of the surrounding area.

In 1958, the United States Office of Civil and Defense Mobilization designated Santa Rosa as one of its eight regional headquarters, with jurisdiction over Region 7, which included American Samoa, Arizona, California, Guam, Hawaii, Nevada, and Utah. Santa Rosa continued as a major center for civil defense activity (under the Office of Emergency Planning and the Office of Emergency Preparedness) until 1979 when the Federal Emergency Management Agency (FEMA) was created in its place, ending the civil defense's 69-year history.

Between 1972 and 1973, Santa Rosa was the site of at least seven murders of hitchhikers. The perpetrator was never caught but the Zodiac Killer had been suspected as the possible perpetrator.

When the City Council adopted the city's first modern General Plan in 1991, the population was about 113,000. In the 21 years following 1970, Santa Rosa grew by about 3,000 residents a year—triple the average growth during the previous twenty years.

Santa Rosa 2010, the 1991 General Plan, called for a population of 175,000 in 2010. The Council expanded the city's urban boundary to include all the land then planned for future annexation, and declared it would be Santa Rosa's "ultimate" boundary. The rapid growth that was being criticized as urban sprawl became routine infill development.

At the first five-year update of the plan, in 1996, the Council extended the planning period by ten years, renaming it Vision 2020 (updated to Santa Rosa 2020, and then again to Santa Rosa 2030 Vision), and added more land and population.

Santa Rosa annexed the community of Roseland in November 2017.

=== 2017 firestorm ===
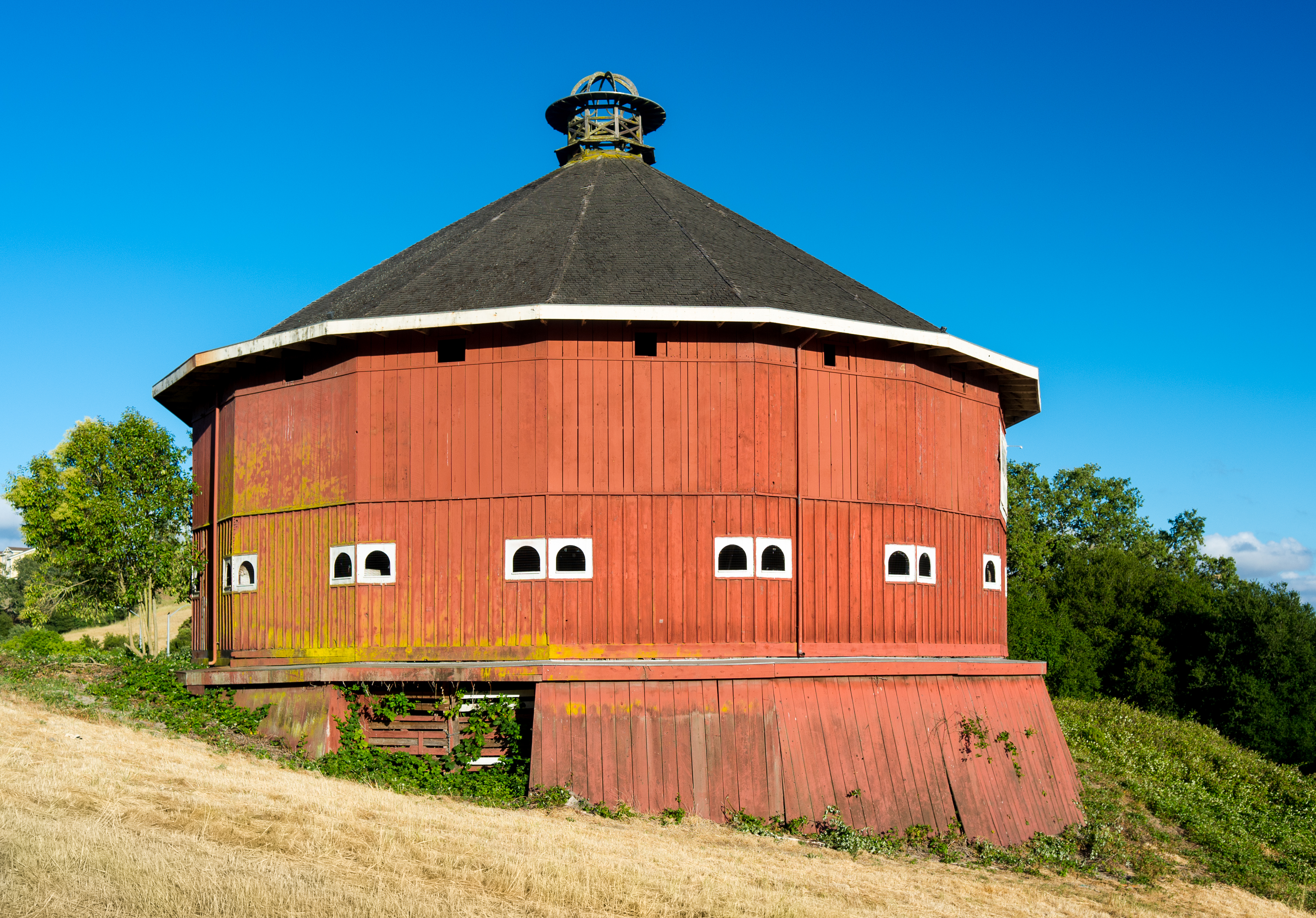
The historic Fountaingrove Round Barn, previously found at the southwestern base of Fountaingrove, was lost to fire in 2017.

Beginning on the night of October 8, 2017, five percent of the city's homes were destroyed in the Tubbs Fire, a 45,000-acre wildfire that claimed the lives of at least 19 people in Sonoma County. Named after its origin near Tubbs Lane and Highway 128 in adjacent Napa County, the fire became a major section of the most destructive and third deadliest firestorm in California history. Most homes in the Coffey Park, Larkfield-Wikiup, and Fountain Grove neighborhoods were destroyed.

A notable exception to the destruction in the area was the protection of more than 1,000 animals at the renowned Safari West Wildlife Preserve northeast of Santa Rosa. All of the preserve's animals were saved by owner Peter Lang. At age 76, he single-handedly and successfully fought back the flames for more than 10 hours using garden hoses.

== Geography ==
According to the United States Census Bureau, the city has a total area of 41.50 sq mi (107.5 km^{2}). Of that area, 41.29 sq mi (106.9 km^{2}) is land and 0.205 sq mi (0.5 km^{2}), comprising 0.49%, is water.

The city is part of the North Bay region, which includes such cities as Petaluma, Rohnert Park, Windsor, and smaller cities as Sonoma, Healdsburg, Sebastopol. It lies along the US Route 101 corridor, approximately 55 miles (89 km) north of San Francisco, via the Golden Gate Bridge.

Santa Rosa lies on the Santa Rosa Plain. The city's eastern extremities stretch into the Valley of the Moon, and the Sonoma Creek watershed known as the Sonoma Valley. The city's western edge lies in the Laguna de Santa Rosa catchment basin.

The city is in the watershed of Santa Rosa Creek, which rises on Hood Mountain and discharges to the Laguna de Santa Rosa. Tributary basins to Santa Rosa Creek lying significantly in the city are Brush Creek, Matanzas Creek, and Piner Creek. Other water bodies within the city include Fountaingrove Lake, Lake Ralphine, and Santa Rosa Creek Reservoir.

The prominent visual features east of the city include Bennett Peak, Mount Hood, and Sonoma and Taylor mountains.

=== Climate ===
Santa Rosa has a warm-summer Mediterranean climate (Köppen Csb) with cool, wet winters and warm, dry summers. In the summer, fog and low overcast often move in from the Pacific Ocean during the evenings and mornings. They usually clear up to very warm, sunny weather by late morning or noon before returning in the later evening but will occasionally linger all day. Average annual rainfall is 32.20 inches (818 mm), falling on 74 days annually. The wettest "rain year" was from July 1982 to June 1983 with 55.66 inches (1,413.8 mm) and the driest from July 1976 to June 1977 with 13.06 inches (331.7 mm). The most rainfall in one month was 19.42 inches (493.3 mm) in February 1998 and the most rainfall in 24 hours was 5.23 inches (132.8 mm) on December 19, 1981. Measurable snowfall is extremely rare in the lowlands, but light amounts sometimes fall in the nearby mountains.

There are an average of 28.9 afternoons with highs of 90 °F (32.2 °C) or more and an average of 30.2 mornings with lows reaching the freezing mark. The record high was 115 °F (46.1 °C) on September 6, 2022, and the record low was 9 °F (−12.8 °C) on December 25, 1924.

Climate data for Santa Rosa, California (1991–2020 normals, extremes 1902–present)
Month	Jan	Feb	Mar	Apr	May	Jun	Jul	Aug	Sep	Oct	Nov	Dec	Year
Record high °F (°C)	85 (29)	93 (34)	91 (33)	98 (37)	104 (40)	109 (43)	113 (45)	107 (42)	115 (46)	105 (41)	92 (33)	83 (28)	115 (46)
Mean maximum °F (°C)	68.4 (20.2)	74.1 (23.4)	79.0 (26.1)	84.2 (29.0)	88.2 (31.2)	96.1 (35.6)	96.7 (35.9)	98.1 (36.7)	98.8 (37.1)	93.1 (33.9)	79.9 (26.6)	68.5 (20.3)	100.5 (38.1)
Mean daily maximum °F (°C)	59.7 (15.4)	63.6 (17.6)	66.9 (19.4)	70.6 (21.4)	74.5 (23.6)	80.2 (26.8)	81.6 (27.6)	83.0 (28.3)	83.9 (28.8)	78.9 (26.1)	67.1 (19.5)	59.0 (15.0)	72.4 (22.4)
Daily mean °F (°C)	49.1 (9.5)	51.8 (11.0)	54.4 (12.4)	57.3 (14.1)	61.1 (16.2)	65.6 (18.7)	66.9 (19.4)	67.7 (19.8)	67.5 (19.7)	63.3 (17.4)	54.6 (12.6)	48.6 (9.2)	59.0 (15.0)
Mean daily minimum °F (°C)	38.4 (3.6)	40.0 (4.4)	41.9 (5.5)	43.9 (6.6)	47.8 (8.8)	51.1 (10.6)	52.1 (11.2)	52.5 (11.4)	51.0 (10.6)	47.6 (8.7)	42.0 (5.6)	38.2 (3.4)	45.5 (7.5)
Mean minimum °F (°C)	29.4 (−1.4)	31.2 (−0.4)	34.0 (1.1)	36.8 (2.7)	42.1 (5.6)	45.3 (7.4)	48.2 (9.0)	48.0 (8.9)	45.6 (7.6)	39.8 (4.3)	32.3 (0.2)	29.4 (−1.4)	27.2 (−2.7)
Record low °F (°C)	15 (−9)	20 (−7)	24 (−4)	26 (−3)	27 (−3)	30 (−1)	39 (4)	34 (1)	30 (−1)	24 (−4)	21 (−6)	9 (−13)	9 (−13)
Average rainfall inches (mm)	5.78 (147)	6.39 (162)	4.26 (108)	1.98 (50)	1.28 (33)	0.29 (7.4)	0.01 (0.25)	0.04 (1.0)	0.15 (3.8)	1.63 (41)	3.25 (83)	6.47 (164)	31.53 (801)
Average rainy days (≥ 0.01 in)	11.8	10.4	9.8	7.1	3.4	1.2	0.3	0.6	1.0	3.3	7.3	10.5	66.7
Average relative humidity (%)	81	77	71	66	62	58	60	60	60	63	73	81	68
Average dew point °F (°C)	42 (6)	43 (6)	45 (7)	45 (7)	48 (9)	51 (11)	53 (12)	53 (12)	51 (11)	48 (9)	45 (7)	43 (6)	47 (9)
Source 1: NOAA
Source 2: timeanddate.com (Charles M. Schulz-Sonoma County Airport: mean temperatures, humidity, and dew point 1985–2015)

=== Seismicity ===
Santa Rosa lies atop the Healdsburg-Rodgers Creek segment of the Hayward-Rodgers Creek Fault System. The Working Group on California Earthquake Probabilities estimated a minimum 27 percent chance of a magnitude 6.7 or greater earthquake on this segment by 2037.

On November 21, 2005, the United States Geological Survey released a map detailing the results of a new tool that measures ground shaking during an earthquake. The map determined that the 1906 San Francisco earthquake was most powerful in an area between Santa Rosa and what is now Sebastopol, causing more damage in Santa Rosa (for its size) than any other city affected.

On October 1, 1969, two earthquakes of magnitudes 5.6 and 5.7 shook Santa Rosa, damaging about 100 structures. They were the strongest quakes to affect the city since 1906. The epicenters were about two miles (3.2 km) north of Santa Rosa.

=== Nature and wildlife ===
Due to its population, much of Santa Rosa's remaining undisturbed area is on its urban fringe. However, the principal wildlife corridors of Santa Rosa Creek and its tributaries flow right through the heart of the town. Great blue herons, great egrets, snowy egrets and black-crowned herons nest in the trees of the median strip on West Ninth Street as well as along Santa Rosa Creek and downtown. Deer often are spotted roaming the neighborhoods nearer the eastern hills, as deep into town as Franklin Avenue and the McDonald area; rafters of wild turkeys are relatively common in some areas; and mountain lions are occasionally observed within city limits. Raccoons and opossums are a common sight throughout the city, while foxes, and rabbits may be regularly seen in the more rural areas. In addition, the city borders and then wraps around the northern end of Trione Annadel State Park, which itself extends into the Sonoma Mountains and Sonoma Valley. Trione-Annadel State Park also adjoins Spring Lake County Park and Howarth Park, forming one contiguous park system that enables visitors to venture into wild native habitats.

=== Neighborhoods ===
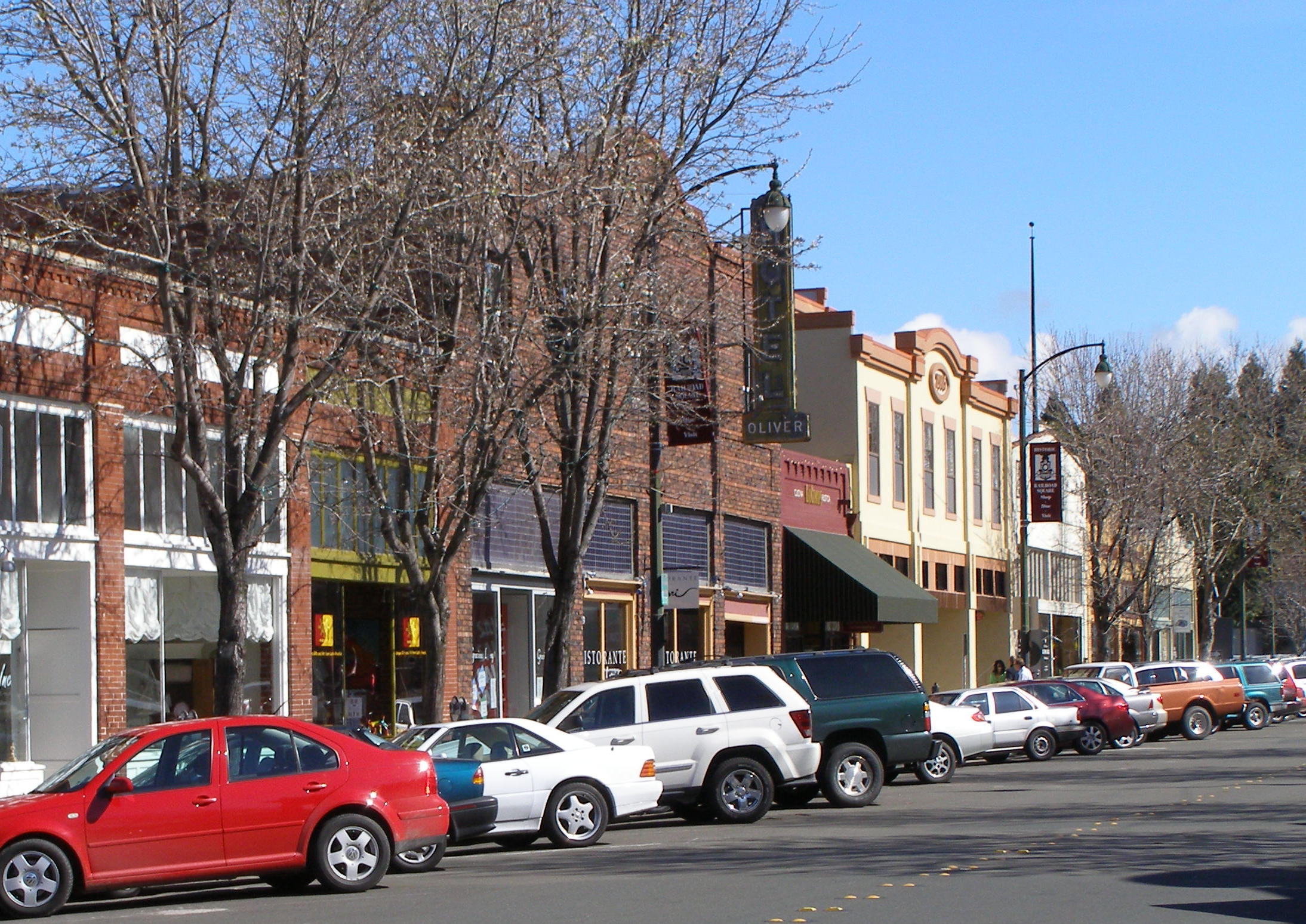
Restaurants and other retail stores occupy several historic buildings in Santa Rosa's Railroad Square district in the downtown area, including these along Fourth Street.

Santa Rosa can be seen as divided into four quadrants: Northeast, Southeast, Southwest, and Northwest. U.S. Route 101 runs roughly north–south through the city, and divides it into east and west sides. State Route 12 runs roughly east–west, and divides the city into north and south sides.

Neighborhoods, including both current ones and areas formerly known and named, include:

- Apple Tree I and II
- Bennett Valley
- Burbank Gardens Historic District
- Cherry Street Historic District
- Coffey Park
- Dutton Avenue
- Fountain Grove
- Hidden Valley
- Holland Heights
- Indian Village
- Juilliard Park
- Junior College
- Lomita Heights
- McDonald Mansion Historic District
- Monroe District, an area historically known, from 1870s on
- Montecito Heights
- Montgomery Village
- Moorland Avenue
- North Junior College
- North West Santa Rosa
- Oakmont Village
- Olive Park
- Railroad Square District
- Ridgway Historic District
- Rincon Valley
- Roseland
- Santa Rosa Avenue
- Skyhawk
- Spring Lake
- Annadel Heights
- South Park
- St. Rose Historic District
- Stonegate
- Town & Country/Grace Tract
- West 3rd
- West End Arts and Theater District
- West End Historic District
- West Junior College
- Valley Oak

== Demographics ==
Historical population
Census	Pop.	Note	%±
1860	1,623		—
1870	2,898		78.6%
1880	3,616		24.8%
1890	5,220		44.4%
1900	6,673		27.8%
1910	7,817		17.1%
1920	8,758		12.0%
1930	10,636		21.4%
1940	12,605		18.5%
1950	17,902		42.0%
1960	31,027		73.3%
1970	50,006		61.2%
1980	82,658		65.3%
1990	113,313		37.1%
2000	147,595		30.3%
2010	167,815		13.7%
2020	178,127		6.1%
2025 (est.)	179,437	▲	0.7%
source: U.S. Decennial Census; 1860–1870 1880-1890; 1900 1910 1920; 1930 1940 1950; 1960 1970 1980; 1990 2000 2010

=== Racial and ethnic composition ===
Santa Rosa city, California – Racial and ethnic composition Note: the US Census treats Hispanic/Latino as an ethnic category. This table excludes Latinos from the racial categories and assigns them to a separate category. Hispanics/Latinos may be of any race.
Race / Ethnicity (NH = Non-Hispanic)	Pop 2000	Pop 2010	Pop 2020	% 2000	% 2010	% 2020
White alone (NH)	104,581	100,126	90,527	70.86%	59.66%	50.82%
Black or African American alone (NH)	3,023	3,660	3,802	2.05%	2.18%	2.13%
Native American or Alaska Native alone (NH)	1,406	1,511	1,395	0.95%	0.90%	0.78%
Asian alone (NH)	5,542	8,521	10,659	3.75%	5.08%	5.98%
Native Hawaiian or Pacific Islander alone (NH)	333	750	972	0.23%	0.45%	0.55%
Other race alone (NH)	260	356	965	0.18%	0.21%	0.54%
Mixed race or Multiracial (NH)	4,132	4,921	8,725	2.80%	2.93%	4.90%
Hispanic or Latino (any race)	28,318	47,970	61,082	19.19%	28.59%	34.29%
Total	147,595	167,815	178,127	100.00%	100.00%	100.00%

=== 2020 ===
The 2020 United States census reported that Santa Rosa had a population of 178,127. The population density was 4,188.5 inhabitants per square mile (1,617.2/km^{2}). The racial makeup of Santa Rosa was 55.7% White, 2.3% African American, 2.3% Native American, 6.1% Asian, 0.6% Pacific Islander, 19.1% from other races, and 13.9% from two or more races. Hispanic or Latino of any race were 34.3% of the population.

The census reported that 98.1% of the population lived in households, 1.1% lived in non-institutionalized group quarters, and 0.8% were institutionalized.

There were 66,843 households, out of which 30.5% included children under the age of 18, 44.2% were married-couple households, 8.5% were cohabiting couple households, 29.7% had a female householder with no partner present, and 17.6% had a male householder with no partner present. 27.1% of households were one person, and 14.2% were one person aged 65 or older. The average household size was 2.62. There were 42,643 families (63.8% of all households).

The age distribution was 21.1% under the age of 18, 8.2% aged 18 to 24, 27.4% aged 25 to 44, 24.6% aged 45 to 64, and 18.7% who were 65 years of age or older. The median age was 39.9 years. For every 100 females, there were 95.0 males.

There were 70,300 housing units at an average density of 1,653.0 units per square mile (638.2 units/km^{2}), of which 66,843 (95.1%) were occupied. Of these, 54.0% were owner-occupied, and 46.0% were occupied by renters.

In 2023, the US Census Bureau estimated that the median household income was $97,410, and the per capita income was $50,520. About 5.4% of families and 9.5% of the population were below the poverty line.

=== 2010 ===
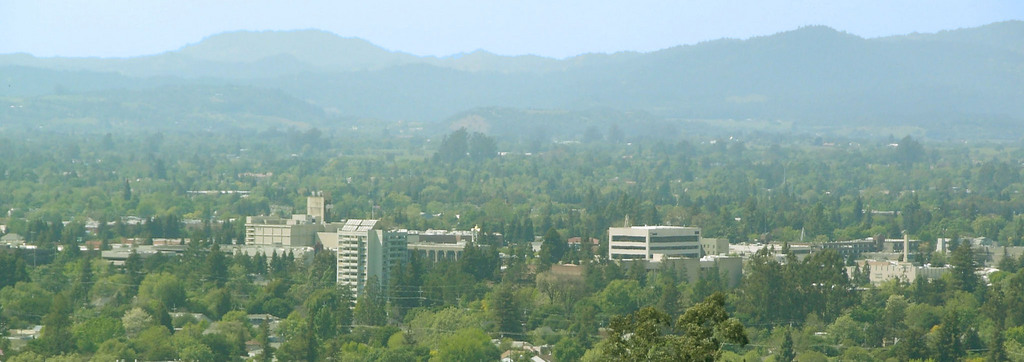
Santa Rosa's skyline

The 2010 United States census reported that Santa Rosa had a population of 167,815. The population density was 4,043.8 inhabitants per square mile (1,561.3/km^{2}). The racial makeup of Santa Rosa was: 119,158 White (59.7% non-Hispanic white), 4,079 (2.4%) African American, 2,808 (1.7%) Native American, 8,746 (5.2%) Asian (1.0% Filipino, 1.0% Chinese, 0.8% Vietnamese, 0.6% Indian, 0.5% Cambodian, 0.5% Laotian, 0.3% Japanese, 0.3% Korean, 0.1% Thai, 0.1% Nepalese), 810 (0.5%) Pacific Islander (0.2% Fijian, 0.1% Samoan, 0.1% Hawaiian, 0.1% Guamanian), 23,723 (14.1%) from other races, 8,491 (5.1%) from two or more races. Hispanic or Latino of any race were 47,970 persons (28.6%). Among the Hispanic population, 98% of Santa Rosa is Mexican, 0.8% Salvadoran, and 0.4% Puerto Rican.

The Census reported that 164,405 people (98.0% of the population) lived in households, 1,697 (1.0%) lived in non-institutionalized group quarters, and 1,713 (1.0%) were institutionalized.

There were 63,590 households, out of which 20,633 (32.4%) had children under the age of 18 living in them, 27,953 (44.0%) were opposite-sex married couples living together, 7,663 (12.1%) had a female householder with no husband present, 3,615 (5.7%) had a male householder with no wife present. There were 5,020 (7.9%) unmarried opposite-sex partnerships, and 757 (1.2%) same-sex married couples or partnerships. 18,021 households (28.3%) were made up of individuals, and 7,474 (11.8%) had someone living alone who was 65 years of age or older. The average household size was 2.59. There were 39,231 families (61.7% of all households); the average family size was 3.18.

In terms of age cohorts, there were 39,217 people (23.4%) under the age of 18, 15,982 people (9.5%) aged 18 to 24, 46,605 people (27.8%) aged 25 to 44, 43,331 people (25.8%) aged 45 to 64, and 22,680 people (13.5%) who were 65 years of age or older. The median age was 36.7 years. For every 100 females, there were 95.2 males. For every 100 females age 18 and over, there were 92.2 males.

There were 67,396 housing units at an average density of 1,624.0 units per square mile (627.0 units/km^{2}), of which 34,427 (54.1%) were owner-occupied, and 29,163 (45.9%) were occupied by renters. The homeowner vacancy rate was 2.0%; the rental vacancy rate was 5.0%. 87,244 people (52.0% of the population) lived in owner-occupied housing units and 77,161 people (46.0%) lived in rental housing units.

As of 2011, there are an estimated 4,539 homeless people living in Sonoma County, many of whom live in Santa Rosa.

Santa Rosa's Hispanic population, mainly of Mexican descent, while spread out through the city, is concentrated within the western part of Santa Rosa. The highest percentage of Hispanic residents in Santa Rosa is in the Apple Valley Lane/Papago Court neighborhood, at 87%.

The Southeast Asian communities, mainly Vietnamese, Laotian, and Cambodian, are concentrated within the western Santa Rosa neighborhoods of Bellevue Ranch, Roseland, and West Steele areas. The northeast neighborhoods of Skyhawk and Fountaingrove have the most populous Chinese communities.

=== Crime ===
Neighborhoods such as South Park in south Santa Rosa, Corby Avenue, and Roseland, West Ninth District, and Apple Valley, Valley Oak on West Steele Lane in northwest Santa Rosa, are most vulnerable to criminal activity. Acts of crime in these neighborhoods are commonly burglaries, graffiti, and violent gang activity. Street gangs such as Sureños and Norteños have large concentrations throughout Santa Rosa. There are multiple other gangs, including mostly racially based gangs or racially mixed that commit theft, street and violent crimes, motorcycle gangs, white supremacist gangs, and prison gangs. In 2011, there were 5 homicides, 58 rapes, 134 robberies, 485 aggravated assaults, and 637 burglaries. The violent crime rate for Santa Rosa (401.7 per 100,000 people) is slightly lower than the rate of California (411.1 per 100,000 people) and higher than that of the entire U.S. (386.3 per 100,000 people).

2021 and especially its late spring and summer saw an increase in shootings, violence, homicides, drug, gang, and homeless-related crimes. The increase was up to double for some crimes and problems, compared to the previous several years.

=== Homelessness ===
There are at least 2,700 homeless people in Sonoma County. Around 1,500 are in Santa Rosa, about one percent of the city. Downtown Santa Rosa, including its outskirts and the area south of the Santa Rosa Mall (Wilson and Morgan Street) and Mendocino Avenue area, South Park/Fairgrounds area, Santa Rosa Avenue, West Steele Lane, and the Joe Rodota Trail/Stony Point districts and neighborhoods have been concentrations of homeless people since the 2000s. Homeless services can be found in the Wilson Street area.

== Economy ==
Forbes Magazine ranked the Santa Rosa metropolitan area 185th out of 200 on its 2007 list of Best Places For Business And Careers. It was second on the list five years earlier. It was downgraded because of an increase in the cost of doing business, and reduced job growth—both blamed on increases in the cost of housing.

=== Top employers ===
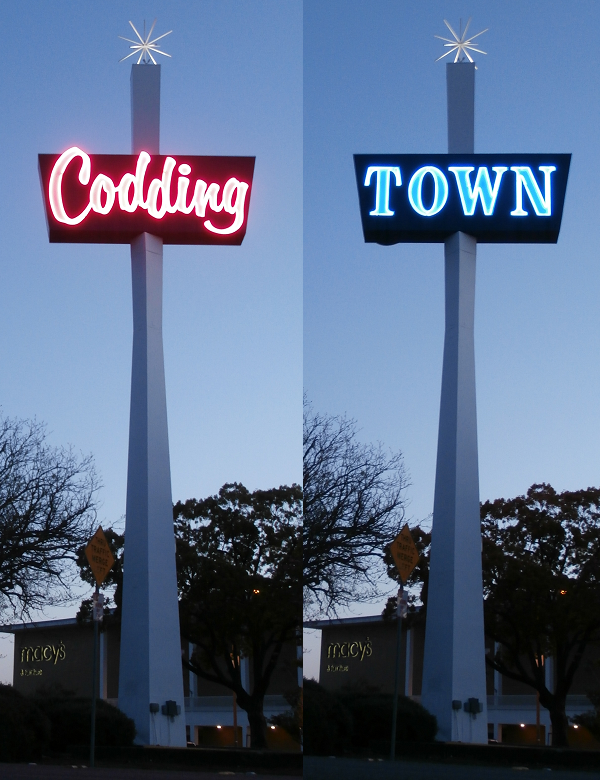
The rotating sign at the east end of Coddingtown Mall facing US Route 101

According to the city's 2023 Annual Comprehensive Financial Report, the city's top employers are:

#	Employer	Employees
1	County of Sonoma	4,284
2	Kaiser Permanente	3,371
3	Santa Rosa Junior College	2,975
4	St. Joseph Health System	2,409
5	Keysight/Agilent Technologies	1,700
6	Santa Rosa School District	1,691
7	City of Santa Rosa	1,279
8	Sutter Medical Center of Santa Rosa	1,196
9	Safeway	796
10	Medtronic/Arterial Vascular Eng	682

Santa Rosa is also home to notable smaller businesses such as Moonlight Brewing Company, Russian River Brewing Company, and other companies.

=== Retail ===
As of 2014, Santa Rosa has 12 neighborhood shopping centers and 17 commercial districts, including three sizeable shopping malls: Santa Rosa Plaza, with more than 100 merchants; Coddingtown Mall, with over 40; and Montgomery Village, an open-air mall with more than 70 shops, a supermarket, five banks, and a satellite U.S. Post Office.

== Arts and culture ==
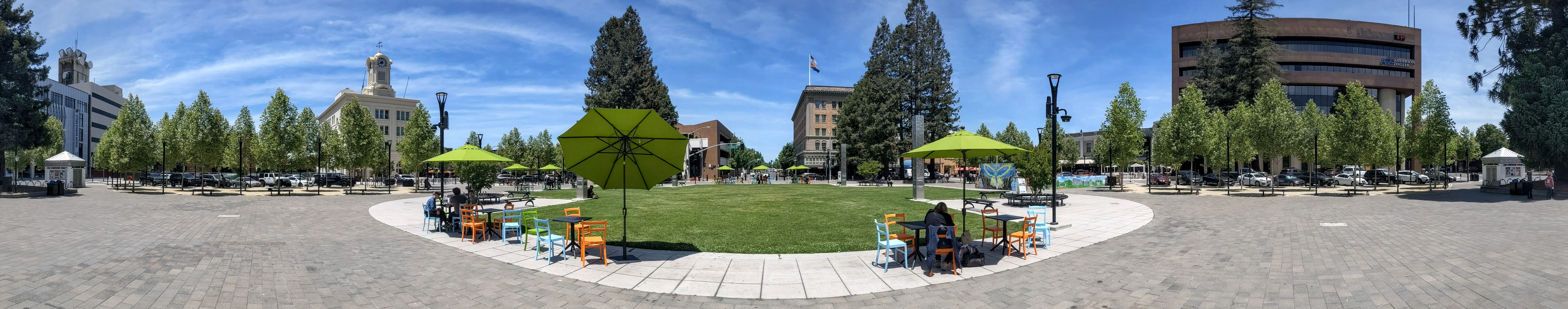
Panoramic view of Old Courthouse Square

=== Libraries ===
The Sonoma County Library offers a Central Library in downtown Santa Rosa, a Roseland branch on Sebastopol Road, a Northwest branch at Coddingtown Mall, and a Rincon Valley branch in east Santa Rosa. It is a member of the North Bay Cooperative Library System. The Santa Rosa Central Library, the largest branch of the Sonoma County Library system, has a Local History and Genealogy Annex behind it.

The Sonoma County Public Law Library is at the Sonoma County Courthouse.

At Santa Rosa Junior College, the four-story Frank P. Doyle Library houses the Library, Media Services, and Academic Computing Departments, as well as the college art gallery, tutorial center and Center for New Media, a multimedia production facility for SRJC faculty.

=== Tourism ===
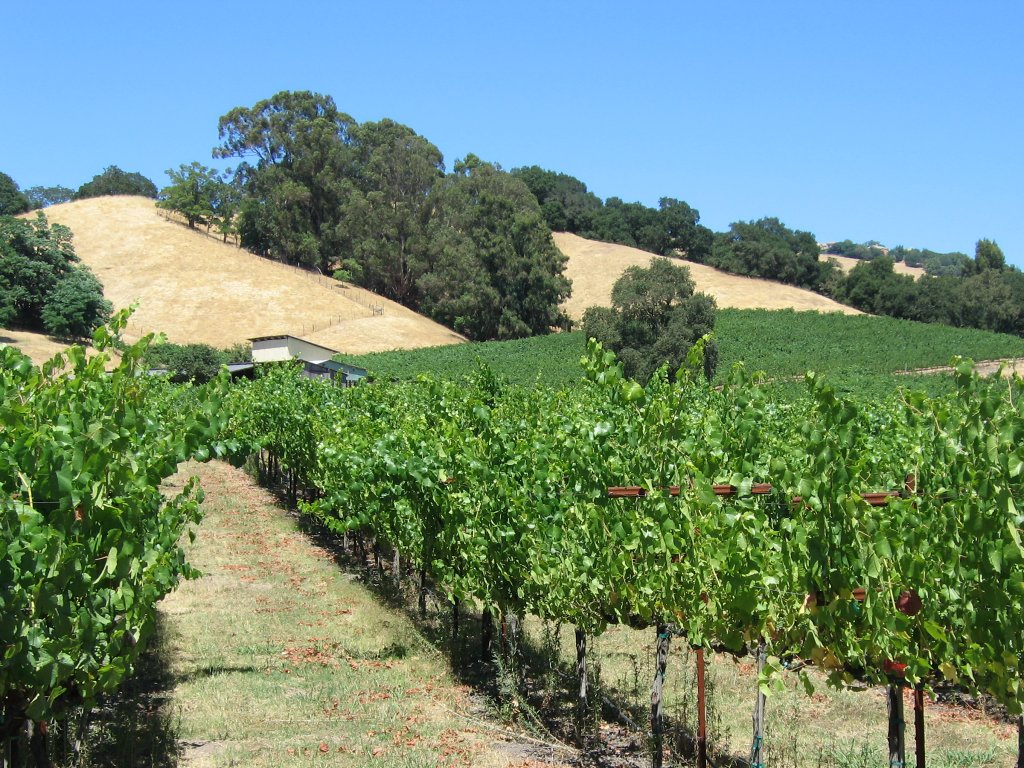
While the most expansive vineyards in Sonoma County, California are in the Alexander, Russian, and Sonoma Valleys, Santa Rosa is home to several vineyards, including this one near Fountain Grove.

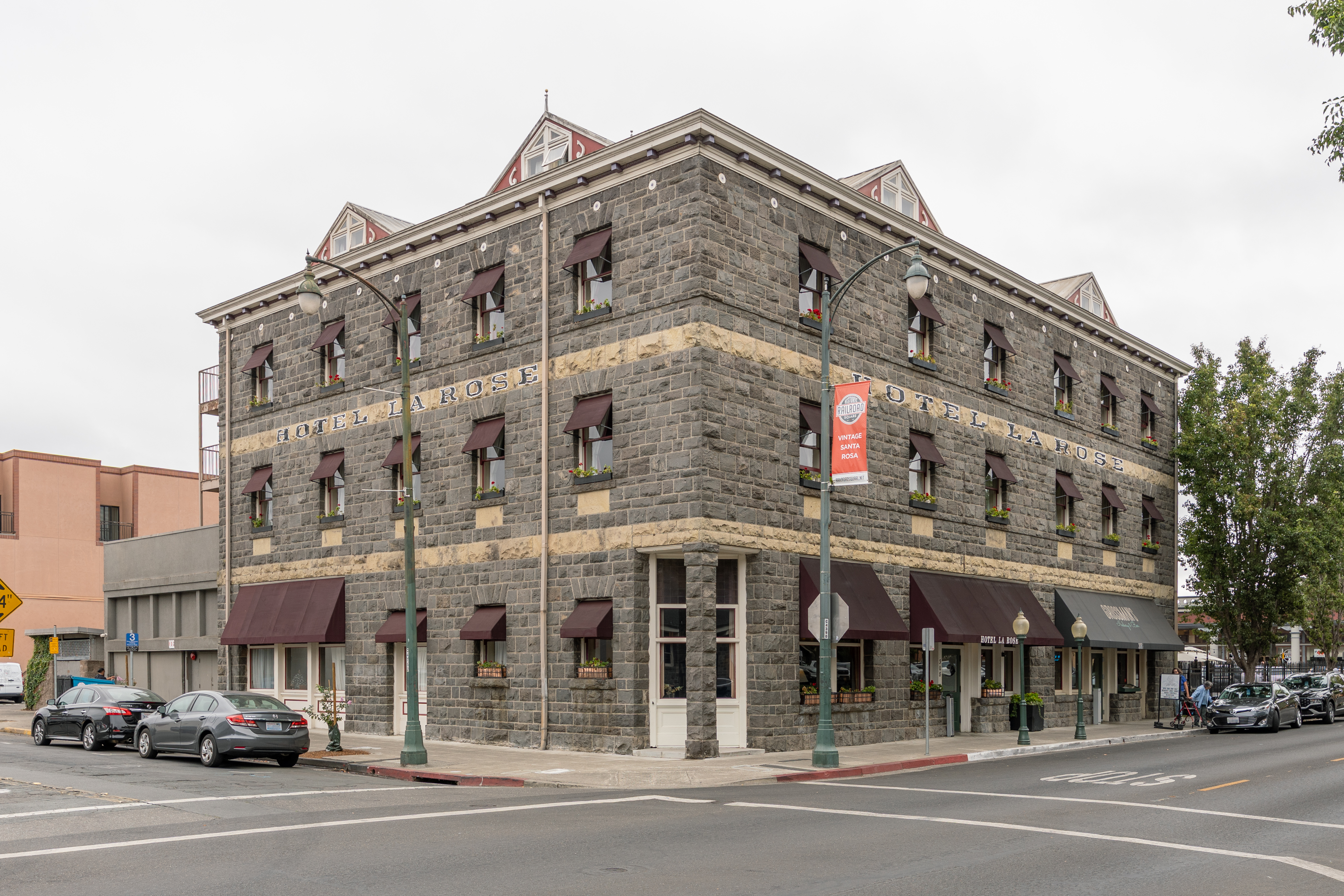
Hotel La Rose, built in 1907, is a functioning historic hotel in downtown Santa Rosa.

Santa Rosa sits at the northwestern gateway to the Sonoma and Napa Valleys of California's famed Wine Country. Many wineries and vineyards are nearby, as well as the Russian River resort area, the Sonoma Coast along the Pacific Ocean, Jack London State Historic Park, and the redwood trees of Armstrong Redwoods State Reserve.

The City Council pays the Santa Rosa Chamber of Commerce to operate the Santa Rosa Convention & Visitors Bureau. The Chamber's visitors center is in the city-owned old railroad depot at the bottom of Fourth Street, in Historic Railroad Square. The SRC&VB has been a California Welcome Center since 2003.

Downtown Santa Rosa, including the central Old Courthouse Square and historic Railroad Square, is an area of shopping, restaurants, nightclubs, and theaters. Downtown also includes City Hall, state and federal office buildings, many banks, and professional offices. The Santa Rosa Memorial Hospital medical center is just to the east of downtown.

Although there are co-op network atms and several credit unions, there is no shared branching for credit unions in Santa Rosa.

The city council funds a private booster group, Santa Rosa Main Street, which lobbies the city to revitalize the traditional business district. Three new mixed-use, high-rise buildings, and a new city parking garage, are under development.

The nearby cities and towns of Bodega Bay, Calistoga, Guerneville, Healdsburg, Petaluma, Sebastopol, Sonoma, and Windsor are popular with tourists and readily accessible from Santa Rosa.

Railroad Square is the portion of downtown that is on the west side of U.S. Route 101 and has the highest concentration of historic commercial buildings. Of particular note are the four rough-hewn stone buildings at its core, two of which are rare in that they predate the 1906 earthquake. They include the old Northwestern Pacific Railroad depot, prominently seen in the beginning and the end of the Alfred Hitchcock film Shadow of a Doubt, and the still-functioning Hotel La Rose, built in 1907 and registered as one of the National Trust for Historic Preservation's Historic Hotels of America. The area contains numerous other historic buildings, such as the former Petaluma and Santa Rosa Railroad depot, and the Lee Bros Building, both at the corner of 4th and Wilson Streets. Near it in the West End district are numerous other old buildings, including not only many old houses but the masonry DeTurk Winery complex, dating to the 1880s–1890s, and the DeTurk round barn. Also of note nearby is the former Del Monte Cannery Building, built in 1894. One of the oldest surviving commercial buildings in town, it was renovated into the 6th Street Playhouse in 2005.

=== Local attractions ===
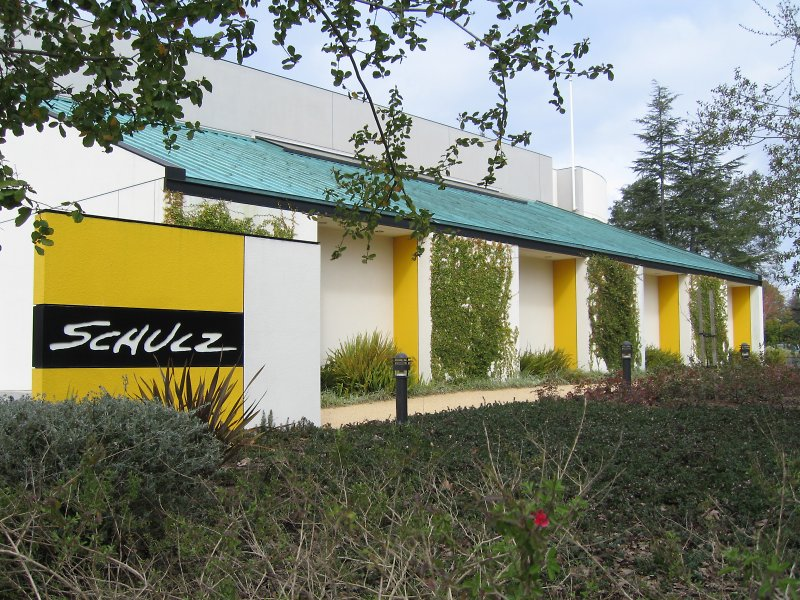
The Charles M. Schulz Museum and Research Center on the corner of West Steele Lane and Hardies Lane, next to Snoopy's Home Ice skating rink

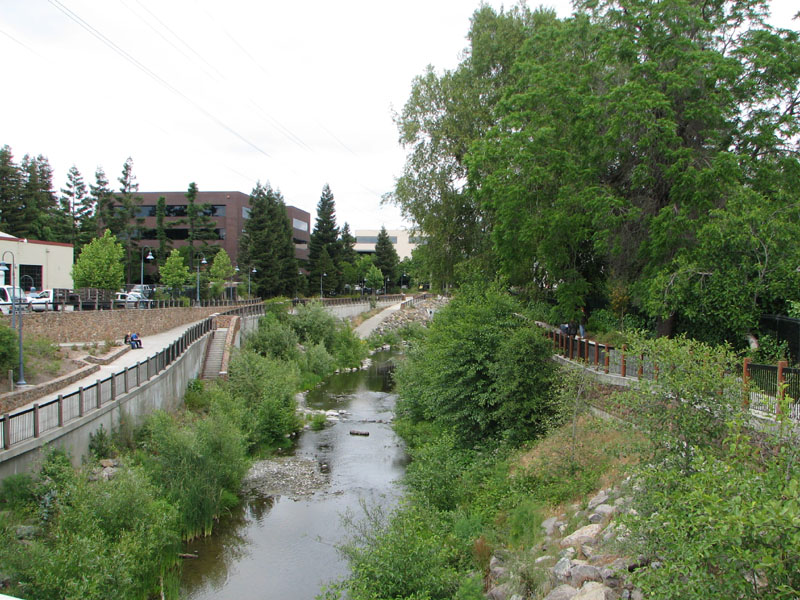
Prince Memorial Greenway, a bicycle and pedestrian path through downtown Santa Rosa

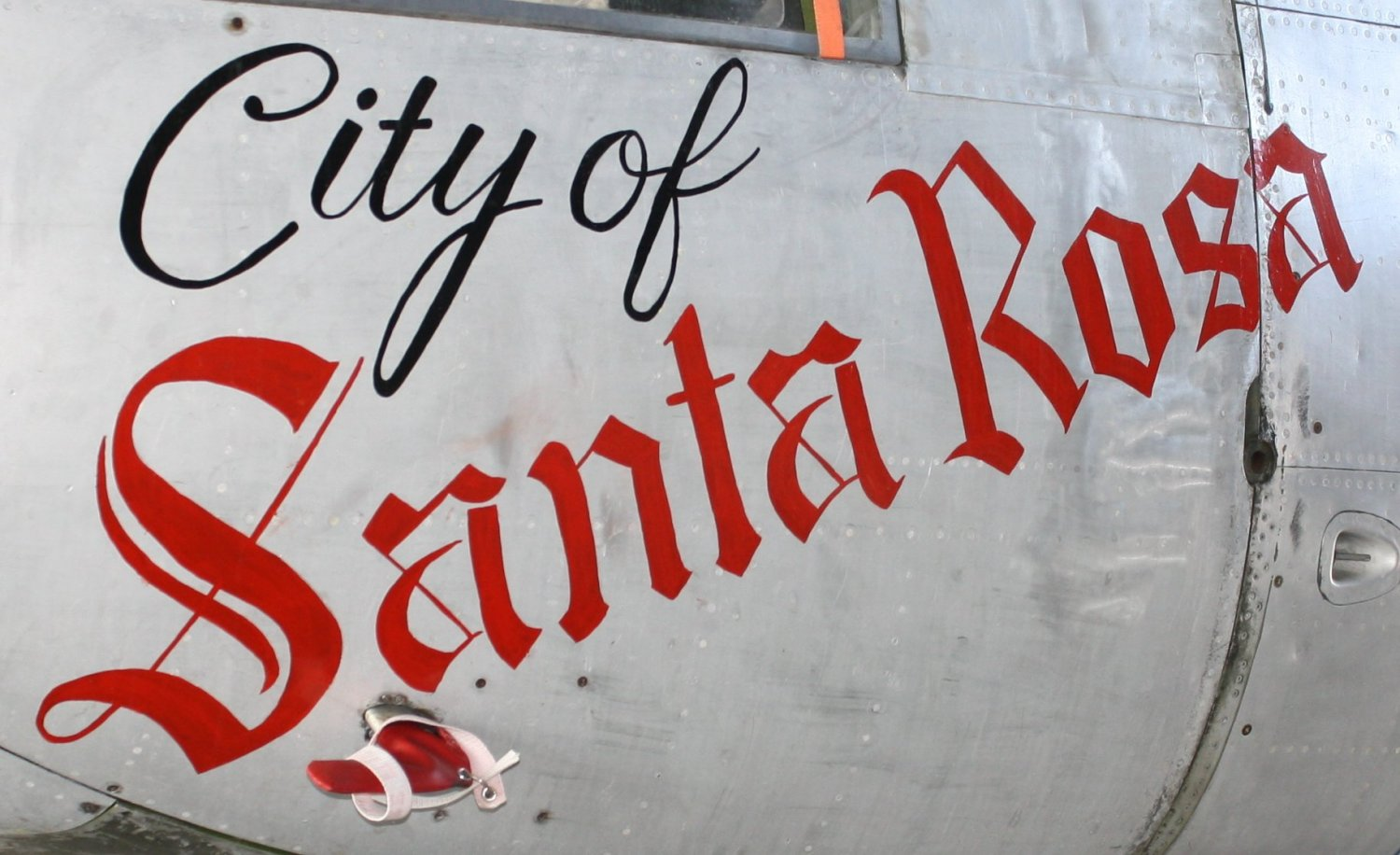
City of Santa Rosa, an A-26 Invader attack bomber built in 1944

- Carrillo Adobe. Built in 1837 for Dona Maria Ignacia Lopez de Carrillo, General Mariano Vallejo's mother-in-law, the Carrillo Adobe was the first home on the site of the future Santa Rosa. The remains of the Carrillo home rest behind a cyclone fence off Montgomery Drive, on property owned by the Roman Catholic Diocese of Santa Rosa in California, adjacent to its Cathedral of St. Eugene.
- Luther Burbank Home and Gardens
- Charles M. Schulz Museum and Research Center
- Redwood Empire Ice Arena ("Snoopy's Home Ice")
- Safari West wildlife preserve is located northwest Santa Rosa. As of 2017, Safari West had over 1,000 animals of approximately 98 animal species.
- Museum of Sonoma County
- Doyle Community Park
- Spring Lake Regional Park
- Trione-Annadel State Park
- Railroad Square. With the highest concentration of historic commercial buildings in Santa Rosa, this portion of downtown is popular with both tourists and locals.
- Historic residential neighborhoods. Although most of Santa Rosa's commercial buildings were destroyed in the 1906 earthquake, almost all of its numerous houses survived and most have survived to this day. As a result, Santa Rosa has a number of old neighborhoods in and around downtown, several historically designated. These contain numerous old homes, including many Victorians. Most of these are on quiet, often tree-lined streets. An example of one of these houses would be the McDonald Mansion, near downtown.
- The annual Luther Burbank Rose Parade and Festival
- California Indian Museum and Cultural Center
- The Pacific Coast Air Museum is located on the southeast corner of the Charles M. Schulz–Sonoma County Airport, next to the airplane hangar used in the 1963 Hollywood all-star comedy movie It's a Mad, Mad, Mad, Mad World.

=== Performing and visual arts ===
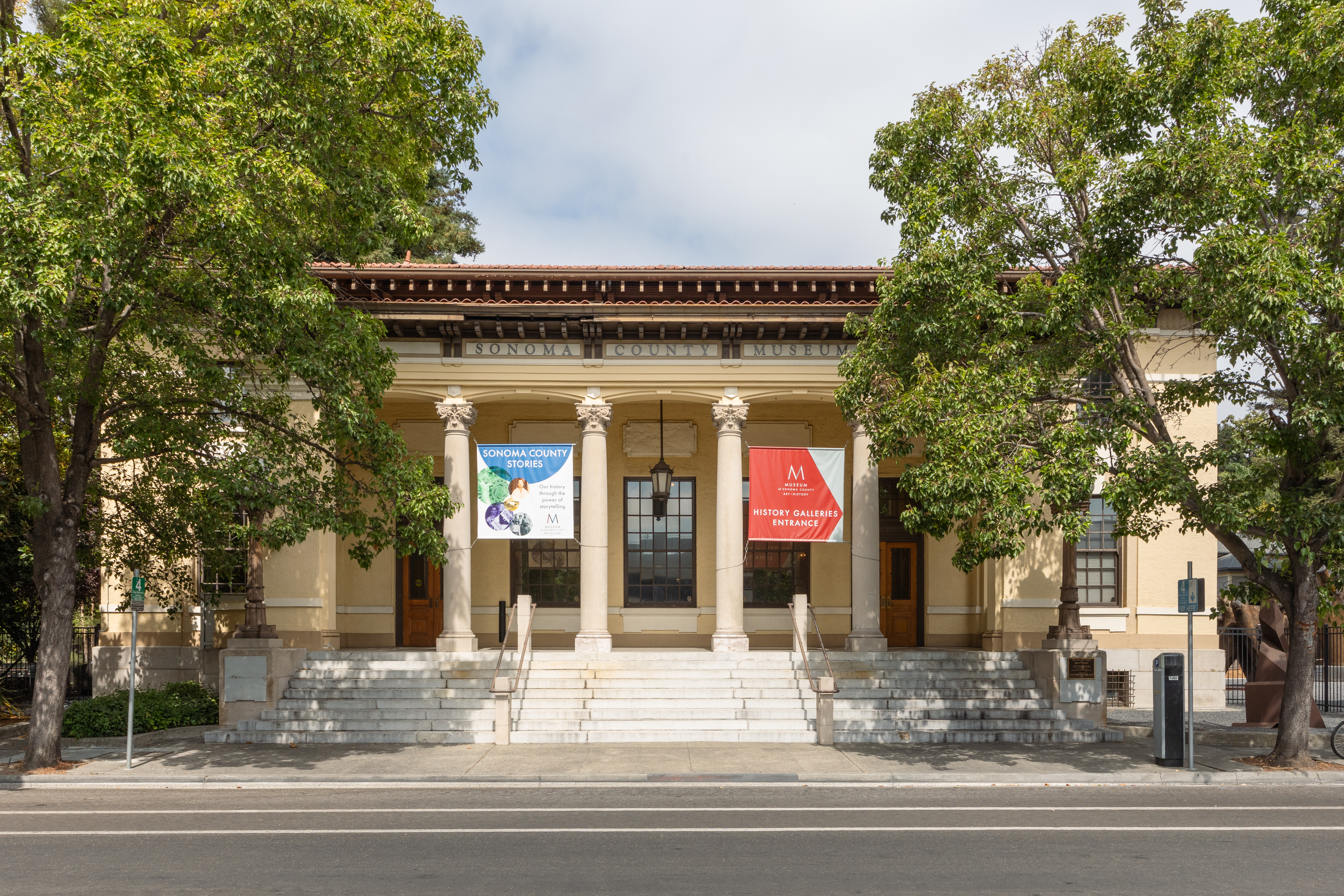
Museum of Sonoma County on 7th St. in downtown Santa Rosa. Completed in 1910, it was originally the Post Office and Federal Building.

The performing arts in Santa Rosa are represented by Luther Burbank Center for the Arts, the Sonoma County Philharmonic, the Summer Repertory Theatre, the Santa Rosa Symphony, and the 6th Street Playhouse. Santa Rosa is the home of the North Bay Theater Group, an alliance of some 40 theater companies, theater departments and individual performance companies from five North Bay counties.

The Luther Burbank Center for the Arts (LBC) is a performance venue, that opened in 1981.

The Sonoma County Philharmonic performs at the Santa Rosa High School Performing Arts Auditorium. It is a 65-member orchestra made up of professional-level local musicians who volunteer their time.

The Santa Rosa Symphony, a regional orchestra founded in 1928, performs at the Green Music Center in Rohnert Park, a new venue with traditional "shoebox" acoustics. The Symphony's Institute for Music Education supports four youth ensembles and provides classical music education to students across Sonoma County, serving 30,000 elementary students per year. Francesco Lecce-Chong has served as music director since 2018, replacing Bruno Ferrandis, who held the post for twelve years.

The visual arts are represented by the Museum of Sonoma County and numerous independent art galleries.

In 2020, during the COVID-19 pandemic, Jessica Rasmussen, Anna Wiziarde, and Julian Billotte set up a mailbox painted gold with Dutch metal, for queries concerning the past or the future to be collected and answered by the "United States Portal Service" as part of the city's Open & Out project, with the aims of supporting the US Post Office and alleviating loneliness.

== Government ==
In the United States House of Representatives, Santa Rosa is split between California's 2nd Congressional District in the west represented by Democrat Jared Huffman, and California's 4th Congressional District in the east, represented by Democrat Mike Thompson. It was moved to the district beginning with the 2013 Congress. In the 1980s, future U.S. Senator Barbara Boxer was Santa Rosa's representative.

In the California State Legislature, the city is located entirely within California's 2nd Senate District represented by Democrat Mike McGuire. The city is split with the northern portion located in California's 2nd Assembly District represented by Democrat Chris Rogers, and the southern portion located in California's 12th Assembly district represented by Democrat Damon Connolly

The city's mayor is Mark Stapp, its vice mayor is Eddie Alvarez, and the other five council members are Dianna MacDonald, Victoria Fleming, Caroline Bañuelos, Jeff Okrepkie, and Natalie Rogers.

According to the California Secretary of State, as of February 10, 2019, Santa Rosa has 91,998 registered voters. Of those, 47,905 (52.1%) are registered Democrats, 15,260 (16.6%) are registered Republicans, and 24,012 (26.1%) have declined to state a political party.

== Education ==
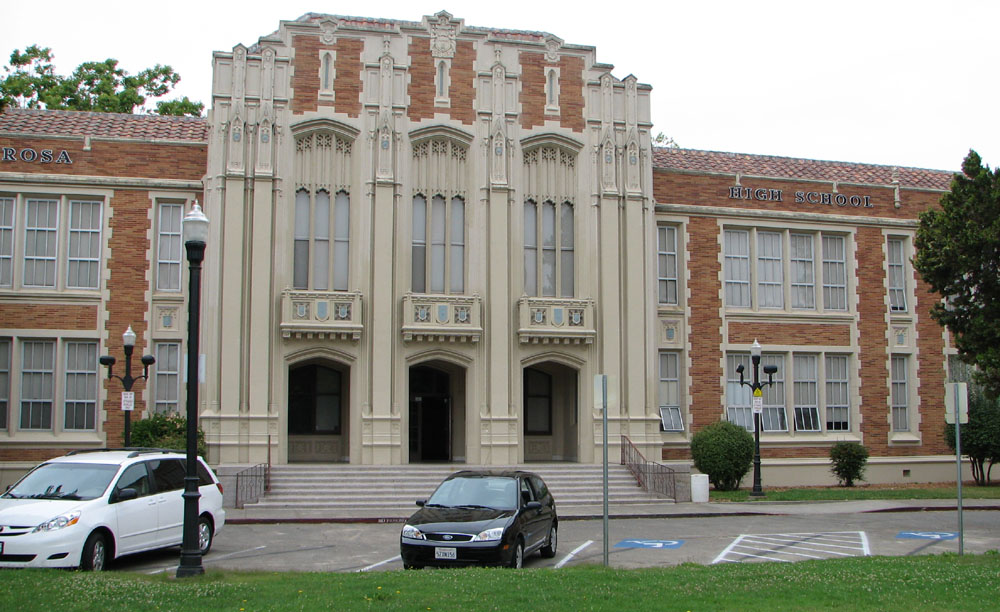
Santa Rosa High School, the first high school in Santa Rosa and one of the oldest high schools in California

=== School districts ===
Multiple school districts cover portions of the city.

The Santa Rosa City Schools system includes the Santa Rosa Elementary School District and the Santa Rosa High School District.

The vast majority of the city is in Santa Rosa High School District, while small portions are in West Sonoma County Union High School District.

Elementary school districts which cover portions of the city and which feed into the Santa Rosa high school district:

- Santa Rosa
- Bellevue Union
- Bennett Valley Union
- Kenwood
- Mark West Union
- Piner-Olivet Union
- Rincon Valley Union
- Roseland Public Schools
- Wright Union School District

Elementary school districts which cover portions of the city an which feed into the West Sonoma County high school district are Sebastopol Union Elementary School District and Oak Grove Union.

=== Private schools ===
- Cardinal Newman High School (9–12)
- Redwood Adventist Academy (K–12)
- Sonoma Academy (9–12)
- St. Eugene's cathedral school
- St. Luke's Elementary School
- St. Rose Elementary School
- Sonoma Country Day School (K–8)
- Summerfield Waldorf School & Farm (K–12)
- Stuart School (K–8)
- Victory Christian Academy (K–12)

=== Colleges ===
- Empire College
- Santa Rosa Junior College
- University of San Francisco (USF) – Santa Rosa

== Media ==
=== Print ===
The Press Democrat is published in Santa Rosa and is the largest daily newspaper in the North Bay. It is descended from the Sonoma Democrat, founded in 1857. Local business papers include the North Bay Business Journal and NorthBay biz. The North Bay Bohemian is a free weekly alternative. The Sonoma County Gazette is a free monthly paper.

Sonoma Media Investments is a significant regional presence: besides the Press Democrat and the North Bay Business Journal as well as the Sonoma County Gazette, it owns important newspapers in the nearby cities of Sonoma and Petaluma.

=== Television ===
The television studios of KQSL are located in Santa Rosa. Santa Rosa is primarily served by the San Francisco media market.

=== Radio ===
The commercial radio stations KZST 100.1 FM and KSRO 103.5 FM are licensed to Santa Rosa. Santa Rosa is also home to Wine Country Radio, a group of five stations: KRSH 95.9 FM, Exitos 98.7 FM, Latino 100.9 FM, BOB FM 96.7, and The Drive 95.5 FM.

== Infrastructure ==
=== Law enforcement ===
The Santa Rosa Police Department currently has 259 employees, of which 172 are sworn peace officers. Its budget is more than $40 million, comprising more than one third of the city's General Fund budget. Police shootings in 2007 led to calls for an independent civilian police review board.

=== Fire department ===
The Santa Rosa Fire Department provides fire protection and emergency medical services. Ambulance services are provided by Sonoma County Fire District working in partnership with Medic Ambulance Service.

The Santa Rosa Fire Department, like many departments across the United States, made its start as a volunteer organization on February 12, 1861. Decades later in 1894 the department made its transition to a paid organization. In 1906 a massive 7.8 magnitude earthquake destroyed most of Santa Rosa. The department grew to 100 firefighters in 1983 with the addition of the city of Roseland to the SRFD responsibility area. Many members of the department serve as part of the California Task Force 4, one of the eight FEMA Urban Search and Rescue Task Forces throughout the state. The team, which is deployed as part of the nation's response to disasters both within and outside of the United States, specializes in dealing with large-scale disasters.

=== Transportation ===
==== Road ====
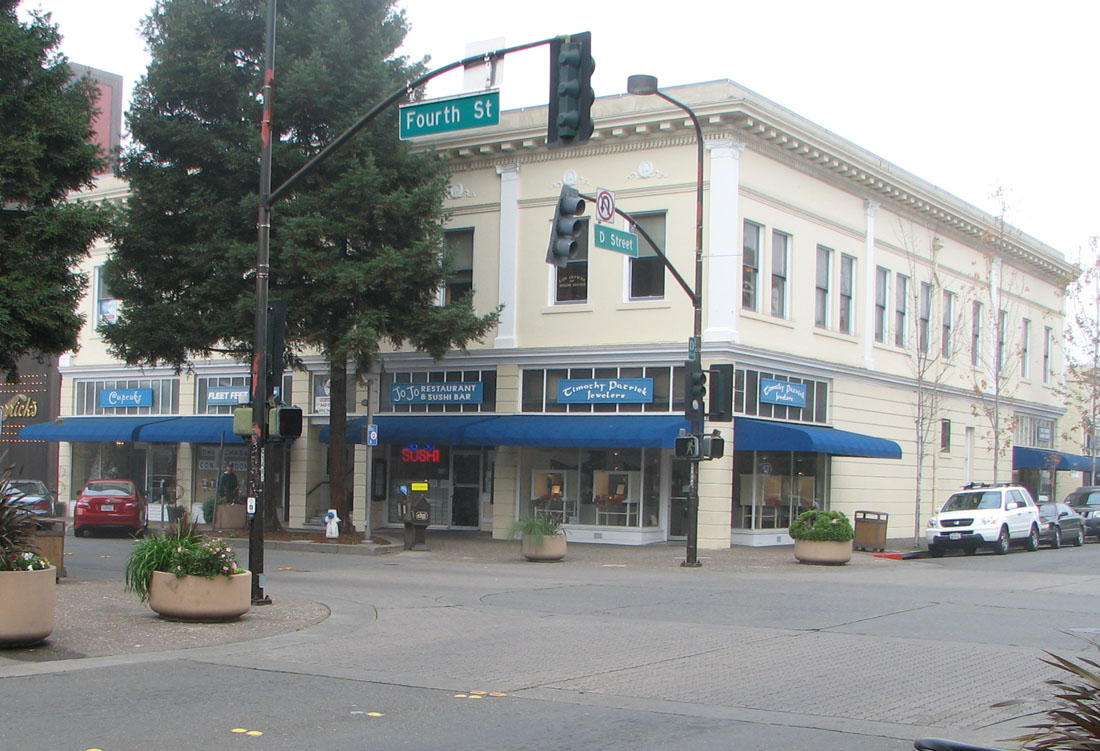
The intersection of 4th & D Streets in downtown Santa Rosa

The city sprawls along the U.S. Route 101 freeway, about an hour north of San Francisco and the Golden Gate Bridge. Sonoma County Transit provides local bus service in the city. Into the 1950s, the Southern Pacific Railroad offered substitute bus service from Crockett in the northwestern edge of the San Francisco Bay.

In 2025, Waymo self-driving cars became available in Santa Rosa.

==== Rail ====
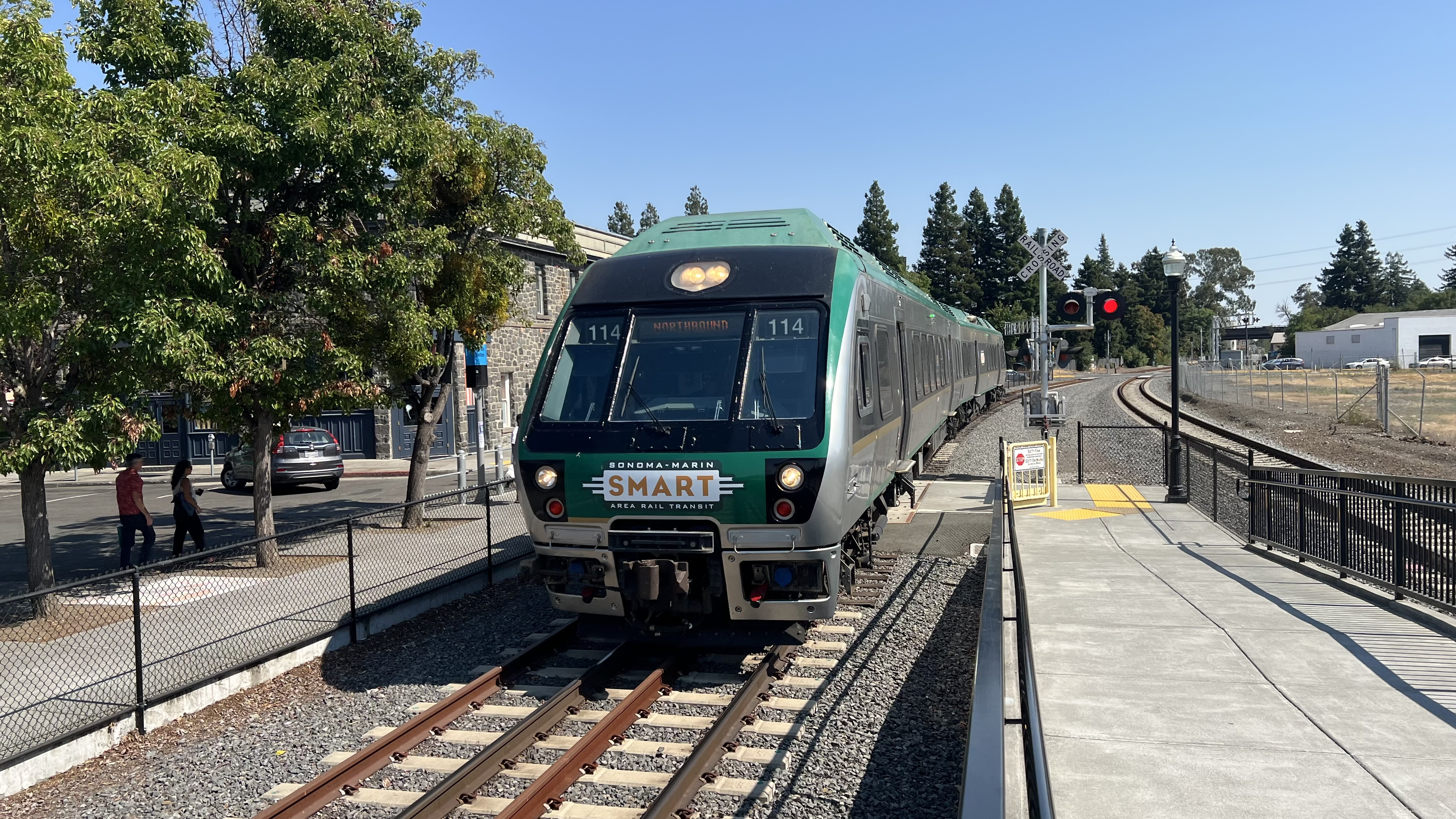
A Sonoma–Marin Area Rail Transit train arriving at Santa Rosa Downtown station.

Sonoma–Marin Area Rail Transit (SMART) brought passenger railway back to Santa Rosa for the first time in 59 years, opening on August 25, 2017. It operates two railway stations within the city limits: Guerneville Road and Railroad Square. Trains serve locations as far south as Larkspur Into the 1950s, the Northwestern Pacific Railroad operated a passenger train from Eureka, through Santa Rosa, to San Rafael at the north edge of the Bay.

The Amtrak Thruway 7 bus provides daily connections to/from Santa Rosa (with a curbside stop at 2012 Range Avenue), Martinez to the south, and Arcata to the north. Additional Amtrak connections are available from Martinez station.

==== Air ====
Charles M. Schulz–Sonoma County Airport located just north of Santa Rosa is served by American, Alaska, and Avelo Airlines. Nonstop jet flights are available to Los Angeles (LAX), Burbank (BUR), San Diego (SAN), Santa Ana Orange County Airport (SNA), Portland (PDX), Seattle (SEA), Las Vegas (LAS), Phoenix (PHX) and Redmond, Oregon (RDM) with seasonal nonstop service operated to Dallas/Fort Worth (DFW) and Palm Springs (PSP). A Sonoma–Marin Area Rail Transit (SMART) train station is located near the airport with shuttle bus service available between the rail station and the airline passenger terminal. Sonoma County Airport Express buses also connect Santa Rosa with Oakland International Airport and San Francisco International Airport.

==== Motor-minimal travel ====
The Prince Memorial Greenway is a developed bicycle and pedestrian path along Santa Rosa Creek through downtown and out to the west of town. Near Railroad Square, it connects directly to the Joe Rodota Trail, a paved path which terminates in Sebastopol. Santa Rosa is on the path of the partially-developed Great Redwood Trail which will run "from San Francisco Bay in Marin County to Humboldt Bay in the north."

== Representation in other media ==
Director Alfred Hitchcock filmed his thriller Shadow of a Doubt in Santa Rosa in 1943; the film gives glimpses of Santa Rosa in the 1940s. Many of the downtown buildings seen in the film no longer exist, as there was major reconstruction in the late 20th century following the strong earthquakes in October 1969. But the rough-stone Northwestern Pacific Railroad depot and the prominent Empire Building (built in 1910 with a gold-topped clock tower) still survive. A scene at the bank was filmed at the corner of Fourth Street and Mendocino Avenue (at present-day Old Courthouse square); the Kress building on Fourth Street is also visible. The courthouse and bank are now gone. The Coen brothers' film The Man Who Wasn't There (2001) is set in Santa Rosa c. 1949.

== Film locations ==
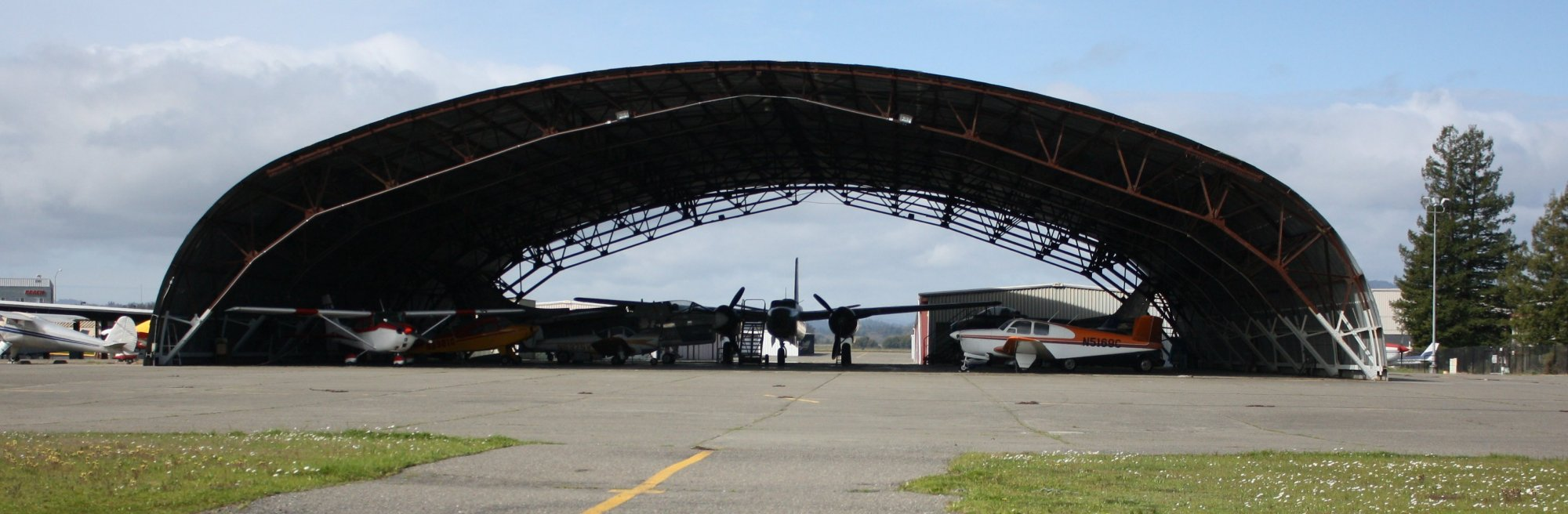
Airplane hangar used in the film It's a Mad, Mad, Mad, Mad World

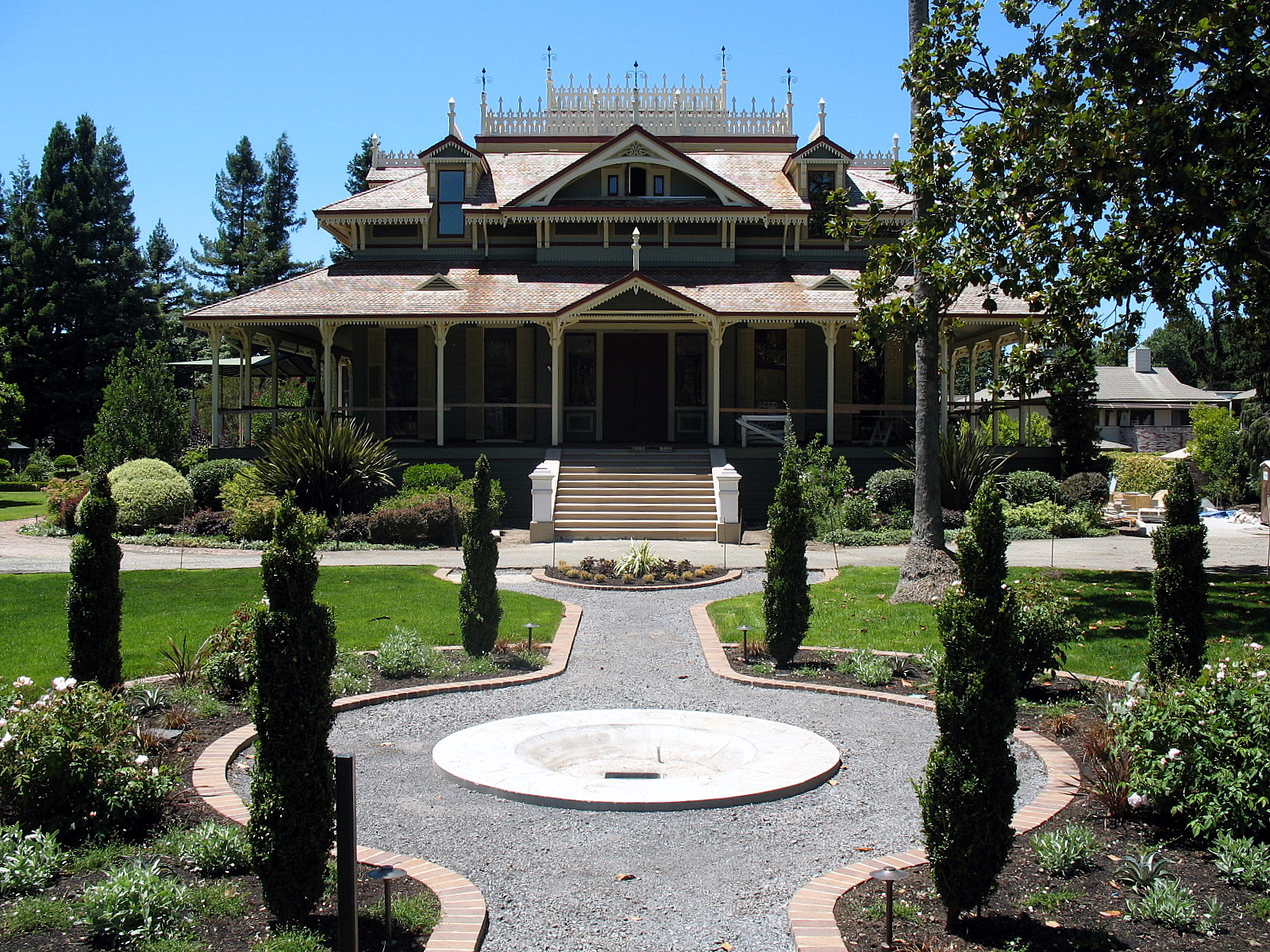
McDonald Mansion in Santa Rosa, whose exterior appears in Pollyanna

Santa Rosa has served as a location for many major films, including:

- The Happy Land (1943), shot in Santa Rosa, including the house at 1127 McDonald Avenue, and Healdsburg. This was Natalie Wood's first movie, at age five.
- Shadow of a Doubt (1943), Alfred Hitchcock's personal favorite, filmed at Santa Rosa Railroad Depot, NWP Engine #140, Old Courthouse Square, Public Library, and the house at 904 McDonald Avenue. The 1991 telefilm remake involved eight weeks of filming at a house at 815 McDonald Avenue.
- The Sullivans (1944), shot on Morgan Street.
- All My Sons (1948), shot at the house at 825 McDonald Avenue.
- Storm Center (1956) – Bette Davis spent six weeks on location at the Santa Rosa Main Library, which keeps a collection of clippings. The movie includes scenes from downtown and a house on Walnut Court.
- Pollyanna (1960), featured the Mableton Mansion (also known as the McDonald Mansion), at 1015 McDonald Avenue.
- The Wonderful World of Disney – The "Inky the Crow" episodes (beginning in the late 1960s), filmed in the Fountain Grove area.
- It's a Mad, Mad, Mad, Mad World (1963) – the sequence involving the plane flying full bore, at about 150 knots, through an airplane hangar in less than a second, was shot at the Sonoma County Airport, just north of Santa Rosa.
- The Candidate (1972), directed by Michael Ritchie, shot in Howarth Park and Schlumberger Gallery.
- Slither (1972) – Highway 101 south of Santa Rosa, and Cloverdale.
- Steelyard Blues (1973), shot in downtown Santa Rosa and at the Naval Auxiliary Landing Field (NALF) located off Stony Point Rd.
- Smile (1975), shot at the Veterans Memorial Auditorium and many other nearby locations. Made into a 1986 Broadway musical of the same name with music by Marvin Hamlisch.
- Little Miss Marker (1980), shot at the Sonoma County Fairgrounds.
- Shoot the Moon (1982), used a real Carl's Jr. on Industrial Drive at Cleveland Avenue. Also filmed at Wolf House at Jack London State Historic Park.
- Cujo (1983) – locations include Santa Rosa and Petaluma.
- Smooth Talk (1985) – locations include Santa Rosa shopping malls and Sebastopol.
- Peggy Sue Got Married (1986) – locations include Santa Rosa High School and Petaluma.
- Wildfire (1988) – includes Wood Pontiac & Cadillac on Corby Avenue.
- Wired (1989) – filmed in Santa Rosa.
- Die Hard 2 (1990) – scenes shot at Santa Rosa Air Center.
- Stop! Or My Mom Will Shoot! (1992) – shot over a four-week period at Santa Rosa Air Center.
- Phenomenon (1996) – used Santa Rosa Junior College as an establishing shot for UC Berkeley. Also used "The Wagon Wheel" bar on Mendocino Avenue for bar scenes.
- Scream (1996) – scenes show a house on McDonald Avenue, a local grocery store, and the Bradley Video Store on Marlow Road.
- Inventing the Abbotts (1997), shot at Santa Rosa High School, on location in Healdsburg and Petaluma.
- Mumford (1999), shot at Santa Rosa Junior College, other Santa Rosa locations, and in Guerneville and Healdsburg.
- Bandits (2001) – locations included the Flamingo Hotel
- The Man Who Wasn't There (2001) – set in Santa Rosa.
- Cheaper by the Dozen (2003) – filmed in Railroad Square.
- Paranormal Activity 3 (2011) – set in Santa Rosa during the 1980s.
- Bad Ass (2012) – set in Santa Rosa in 1957

== Sister cities ==
- Cherkasy, Ukraine
- Jeju City, South Korea
- Los Mochis, Sinaloa, Mexico

== See also ==
- Sonoma State University Library, which holds the Gaye LeBaron Collection: 700 file folders of research notes and primary source materials, containing some 10,000 documents.
- List of California urban areas
- List of cities and towns in California
- List of cities and towns in the San Francisco Bay Area
- Church of One Tree
- Roseland
