= Sonoma County Fire District =

Sonoma County Fire District (SOCO Fire)

Operational area
- Country: United States
- State: California
- County: Sonoma

Agency overview
- Established: April 4th, 2019
- Annual calls: 11,733
- Staffing: Combination
- Fire chief: Ron Busch (2025), Mark Heine (2018-2025)
- EMS level: ALS
- IAFF: 1401
- Motto: "To compassionately care for the safety of our communities and our visitors through progressive professional emergency preparedness and response"

Facilities and equipment
- Battalions: 2
- Stations: 13
- Engines: 13
- Trucks: 1
- Rescues: 1
- Tenders: 7
- Wildland: 11

Website
- Official website
- IAFF website

The Sonoma County Fire District (SOCO Fire) is a special district that provides fire protection, rescue, and emergency medical services to the Town of Windsor, Larkfield-Wikiup, Mark West, Mountain, Middle Rincon, Bennett Valley, Bellevue, Graton Casino, Fulton, Forestville, Bodega Bay, Guerneville, Cotati, Penngrove, Liberty and the surrounding unincorporated areas. The Sonoma County Fire District includes 103,000 residents, covers 246 square miles, and is the second busiest fire protection agency in Sonoma County.

== History ==
Significant regional fires in recent years, including the Tubbs Fire and Kincaide Fire created a need to merge at least some of the nearly 50 different fire agencies within Sonoma County to better combat large-scare disasters as well as respond to day-to-day emergencies.

The Sonoma County Fire District (SCFD) was established in April 2019 after the process of consolidation of the Rincon Valley Fire District (established 1945) and the Windsor Fire Protection District (established 1965) who had already merged administrative and leadership oversight, the Bennett Valley Fire District (established 1948) and the Mountain Volunteer Fire Department (established 1968). In July 2020, the Russian River Fire Protection District (established 1922 as the Guerneville Fire Protection District) was merged into SCFD which allowed the total organization to provide Advanced Life Support first-response and transport care, followed by consolidation of the Forestville Fire Protection District (established 1938 and became a District in 1958) in 2021 and the Bodega Bay Fire Protection District in 2022 and the Rancho Adobe Fire District (established in 1993 after consolidation of the Cotati Fire Protection District and Penngrove Fire Protection District) in 2026.

In May 2022, SCFD subcontracted some ambulance services to Medic Ambulance Service, a single-roll EMS company headquartered in Sacramento, California. Fire apparatus and certain ambulances remain staffed by organic agency Firefighter/Paramedics.

In September 2022, stations in Larkfield and Bennett Valley were both upgraded with the addition of Firefighter/Paramedics and Advanced Life Support capabilities.

In October 2022, “Sonoma County 1,” an Airbus H-135 helicopter, was placed into service in public-private partnership with REACH air medical services. The asset, based out of the Sonoma County Airport, can be configured to search-and-rescue, critical care advanced life support level scene response and interfacility transport, and firefighting capabilities. The public-private partnership allowed for better responses directly to scenes and better coordinated firefighting operations.

== Operations ==
The organization is headquartered out of County Station 1, located in Windsor, and dispatched by REDCOM.

SCFD is an all hazards organization operating fire suppression and advanced life support emergency medical response and transport. The organization is composed of career and volunteer Firefighter/EMTs and Firefighter/Paramedics, contracted single-roll EMTs and Paramedics, and REACH personnel.

Outside of fire suppression and emergency medical services, SCFD offers swift water rescue throughout much of the Russian River area and marine firefighting and search and rescue through a fire boat in Bodega Bay. SCFD also maintains coastal cliff, high, and low angle rope rescue capabilities.

SCFD has a federally-certified Urban Search and Rescue K9 program, with previous deployments around the world as a part of the FEMA Rescue Task Force-4 based out of Oakland. K9 "Rocket" and his handler were featured on the initial episode of the Smithsonian Channel series Dogs with Extraordinary Jobs.

== Notable Incidents ==
Pre-SCFD

Post-SCFD 2017: Tubbs Fire 2019: Kincade Fire 2020: LNU Complex Fires
