= Larkfield-Wikiup, California =

Larkfield-Wikiup
- census-designated place
- Location in Sonoma County and the state of California
- Coordinates: 38°30′31″N 122°45′11″W
- Country: United States
- State: California
- County: Sonoma

Area
  - Total: 5.308 sq mi (13.747 km^{2})
  - Land: 5.308 sq mi (13.747 km^{2})
  - Water: 0 sq mi (0 km^{2}) 0%

Population (2020)
  - Total: 8,492
  - Density: 1,600/sq mi (617.7/km^{2})
- Time zone: UTC-8 (PST)
  - Summer (DST): UTC-7 (PDT)
- ZIP code: 95403
- Area code: 707
- FIPS code: 06-40426
- Website: https://www.markwest.org/

Larkfield-Wikiup is a census-designated place, unincorporated area in Sonoma County, California, United States. The population was 8,492 at the 2020 census, down from 8,884 at the 2010 census. It comprises the Mark West area between Santa Rosa (to the south), Windsor (north), Calistoga (east), and Fulton (west). There are at least four schools within the limits of the CDP, including Cardinal Newman High School, John B. Riebli Elementary School, Mark West Elementary, and San Miguel Elementary schools.

== Geography ==
Larkfield-Wikiup is located approximately 5 miles (8.0 km) north of the city of Santa Rosa.

The CDP has a total area of 5.31 sq mi (13.8 km^{2}), all land. Nevertheless, the Mark West Creek's seasonal flows pass directly through this region.

As of 2005, the landscape is made up of housing developments, interspersed with vineyards, farms, and light industry.

== Demographics ==
Historical population
Census	Pop.	Note	%±
1990	6,779		—
2000	7,479		10.3%
2010	8,884		18.8%
2020	8,492		−4.4%
U.S. Decennial Census; 1990 2000 2010

Larkfield-Wikiup first appeared as a census designated place in the 1990 U.S. census.

=== Racial and ethnic composition ===
Larkfield-Wikiup CDP, California – Racial and ethnic composition Note: the US Census treats Hispanic/Latino as an ethnic category. This table excludes Latinos from the racial categories and assigns them to a separate category. Hispanics/Latinos may be of any race.
Race / Ethnicity (NH = Non-Hispanic)	Pop 2000	Pop 2010	Pop 2020	% 2000	% 2010	% 2020
White alone (NH)	6,074	6,171	5,178	81.21%	69.46%	60.98%
Black or African American alone (NH)	71	76	79	0.95%	0.86%	0.93%
Native American or Alaska Native alone (NH)	70	107	76	0.94%	1.20%	0.89%
Asian alone (NH)	251	274	309	3.36%	3.08%	3.64%
Native Hawaiian or Pacific Islander alone (NH)	8	18	40	0.11%	0.20%	0.47%
Other race alone (NH)	8	23	37	0.11%	0.26%	0.44%
Mixed race or Multiracial (NH)	199	236	454	2.66%	2.66%	5.35%
Hispanic or Latino (any race)	798	1,979	2,319	10.67%	22.28%	27.31%
Total	7,479	8,884	8,492	100.00%	100.00%	100.00%

=== 2020 census ===
As of the 2020 census, Larkfield-Wikiup had a population of 8,492. The population density was 1,599.8 inhabitants per square mile (617.7/km^{2}). The census reported that 98.8% of the population lived in households, 1.0% lived in non-institutionalized group quarters, and 0.2% were institutionalized. 93.8% of residents lived in urban areas, while 6.2% lived in rural areas.

The age distribution was 21.9% under the age of 18, 7.0% aged 18 to 24, 24.3% aged 25 to 44, 27.0% aged 45 to 64, and 19.8% who were 65 years of age or older. The median age was 41.9 years. For every 100 females, there were 96.3 males, and for every 100 females age 18 and over there were 93.0 males age 18 and over.

There were 3,206 households in Larkfield-Wikiup, of which 29.6% had children under the age of 18 living in them. Of all households, 50.3% were married-couple households, 7.4% were cohabiting couple households, 16.7% were households with a male householder and no spouse or partner present, and 25.5% were households with a female householder and no spouse or partner present. About 24.7% of all households were made up of individuals and 12.7% had someone living alone who was 65 years of age or older. The average household size was 2.62. There were 2,174 families (67.8% of all households).

There were 3,434 housing units at an average density of 646.9 units per square mile (249.8 units/km^{2}), of which 6.6% were vacant and 93.4% were occupied. Of the occupied units, 65.3% were owner-occupied and 34.7% were occupied by renters. The homeowner vacancy rate was 1.4% and the rental vacancy rate was 5.9%.

Racial composition as of the 2020 census
Race	Number	Percent
White	5,602	66.0%
Black or African American	80	0.9%
American Indian and Alaska Native	202	2.4%
Asian	324	3.8%
Native Hawaiian and Other Pacific Islander	48	0.6%
Some other race	1,026	12.1%
Two or more races	1,210	14.2%

=== Demographic estimates ===
In 2023, the US Census Bureau estimated that 12.8% of the population were foreign-born. Of all people aged 5 or older, 76.8% spoke only English at home, 19.8% spoke Spanish, 3.1% spoke other Indo-European languages, 0.3% spoke Asian or Pacific Islander languages, and 0.0% spoke other languages. Of those aged 25 or older, 93.5% were high school graduates and 31.8% had a bachelor's degree.

=== Income and poverty ===
The median household income in 2023 was $94,889, and the per capita income was $50,227. About 4.3% of families and 8.3% of the population were below the poverty line.

=== 2010 census ===
The 2010 United States census reported that Larkfield-Wikiup had a population of 8,884. The population density was 1,673.8 inhabitants per square mile (646.3/km^{2}). The racial makeup of Larkfield-Wikiup was 7,042 (79.3%) White, 81 (0.9%) African American, 168 (1.9%) Native American, 292 (3.3%) Asian, 19 (0.2%) Pacific Islander, 878 (9.9%) from other races, and 404 (4.5%) from two or more races. Hispanic or Latino of any race were 1,979 persons (22.3%).

The Census reported that 8,841 people (99.5% of the population) lived in households, 37 (0.4%) lived in non-institutionalized group quarters, and 6 (0.1%) were institutionalized.

There were 3,434 households, out of which 1,179 (34.3%) had children under the age of 18 living in them, 1,729 (50.3%) were opposite-sex married couples living together, 425 (12.4%) had a female householder with no husband present, 204 (5.9%) had a male householder with no wife present. There were 234 (6.8%) unmarried opposite-sex partnerships, and 34 (1.0%) same-sex married couples or partnerships. 811 households (23.6%) were made up of individuals, and 325 (9.5%) had someone living alone who was 65 years of age or older. The average household size was 2.57. There were 2,358 families (68.7% of all households); the average family size was 3.03.

The population was spread out, with 2,150 people (24.2%) under the age of 18, 678 people (7.6%) aged 18 to 24, 2,051 people (23.1%) aged 25 to 44, 2,736 people (30.8%) aged 45 to 64, and 1,269 people (14.3%) who were 65 years of age or older. The median age was 41.0 years. For every 100 females, there were 97.2 males. For every 100 females age 18 and over, there were 94.4 males.

There were 3,596 housing units at an average density of 677.5 per square mile (261.6/km^{2}), of which 2,312 (67.3%) were owner-occupied, and 1,122 (32.7%) were occupied by renters. The homeowner vacancy rate was 1.1%; the rental vacancy rate was 6.5%. 5,787 people (65.1% of the population) lived in owner-occupied housing units and 3,054 people (34.4%) lived in rental housing units.

== Politics ==
In the state legislature, Larkfield-Wikiup is in the 2nd senatorial district, represented by Democrat Mike McGuire, and in the 2nd Assembly district, represented by Democrat Chris Rogers.

Federally, Larkfield-Wikiup is in California's 2nd congressional district, represented by Democrat Jared Huffman.

== Education ==
The school districts are Mark West Union Elementary School District and Santa Rosa High School District.

== Wildfires ==
=== Tubbs Fire ===
In October 2017, the Tubbs Fire destroyed approximately 500 homes in the Larkfield-Wikiup area. The fire blew in through the Mark West Springs area, ultimately destroying 5,000+ buildings in Sonoma and Napa counties.

=== Kincade Fire ===
The Kincade Fire started on October 23, 2019, in The Geysers. The fire exploded to 10,000 acres (4,000 ha) in its first day. The fire ultimately prompted evacuations in much of Sonoma County, and Larkfield was one of the communities evacuated. The fire pushed up to the border of the community during an extreme wind event and blew into parts of the Tubbs Fire burn scar which devastated the community just two years before.

== See also ==
- William Marcus West
