= Taylor Tappin =

American football player (born 1996)

No. 58
- Position: Offensive tackle

Personal information
- Born: July 1, 1996 (age 30); Windsor, California, U.S.
- Listed height: 6 ft 4 in (1.93 m)
- Listed weight: 310 lb (141 kg)

Career information
- High school: Windsor (Windsor, California)
- College: Sacramento State
- NFL draft: 2019: undrafted

Career history
- Oakland Panthers (2019)*; Ottawa Redblacks (2021)*; Montreal Alouettes (2021)*; Ottawa Redblacks (2021); Montreal Alouettes (2022)*; Houston Gamblers (2023)*
- * Offseason or practice squad member only
- Stats at CFL.ca

Taylor Tappin (born July 1, 1996) is an American former professional football offensive tackle. He played college football at Sacramento State University of the Big Sky Conference. He played professionally in the Canadian Football League (CFL) for the Ottawa Redblacks. While training and playing professional football, Tappin simultaneously applied his civil engineering degree working as a water resources engineering technician.

== Early life ==
Tappin was born to parents, Herm and Mary, in Windsor, California. He has one older brother, Tyler, and two younger brothers, Patrick and Phillip.

Tappin did not start playing football until he was in high school. At Windsor High School, he started at offensive tackle for the Jaguars in his junior and senior seasons, earning All-North Bay League honors for his performance in both seasons. Following his senior season, he committed to play college football for the Sacramento State Hornets of the Big Sky Conference.

== College career ==
After redshirting his 2014 freshman season at Sacramento State, Tappin earned playing time in nine games on the offensive line in a reserve role, while also contributing on special teams, in his redshirt freshman 2015 season.

As a redshirt sophomore, he played in nine games, starting four games, at right tackle on an offensive line that led the Hornets rushing attack to 171 yards per game during the 2016 season.

In 2017, as a redshirt junior, he started 11 games at right tackle on an offensive line that led the program's best rushing season (225.8 yards per game) since 1999.

In 2018, as his redshirt senior season, Tappin started every game (10) at left tackle on an offensive line that led a 187 yards per game and 5 yards per carry rushing attack, including 18 rushing touchdowns. His senior performance earned Tappin All-Big Sky Conference Honorable Mention honors as well as Sacramento State's John Gesek Lineman of the Year team award. Over his junior and senior seasons, he started 25 consecutive games – 10 at left tackle and 15 at right tackle.

== Professional career ==
=== Oakland Panthers ===
In October 2019, Tappin signed with the Oakland Panthers of the Indoor Football League. However, he did not play for the team after the 2020 IFL season was cancelled due to the COVID-19 pandemic. The Panthers subsequently withdrew from the IFL's 2021 season.

=== Aviators (The Spring League) ===
Tappin played offensive line for the Aviators of The Spring League for the 2020 and 2021 seasons. In 2020, he played one game for the Aviators in the TSL (fall season) championship, where the team lost to the Generals. Tappin returned to the team for the 2021 spring season as the starting right tackle.

=== Ottawa Redblacks ===
On July 22, 2021, Tappin signed with the Ottawa Redblacks of the CFL, and later was activated from the Reserve/Suspended List on July 27, after clearing the requisite quarantine period. On July 29, the Redblacks released him ahead of the CFL roster deadline.

=== Montreal Alouettes ===
On November 5, 2021, the Montreal Alouettes signed Tappin before formally adding him to the team's practice squad on November 9, after clearing the requisite (COVID-19) quarantine period.

=== Ottawa Redblacks (second stint) ===
In mid-November 2021, Ottawa signed Tappin off of Montreal's practice squad. On November 19, 2021, Tappin made his professional football and CFL debut, playing tackle for the Redblacks in their Week 16 win over the Montreal Alouettes.

=== Montreal Alouettes (second stint) ===
Following his debut with Ottawa, Tappin reverted to Montreal's practice squad. He signed with the Alouettes for the 2022 season, and was released in June 2022.

=== Houston Gamblers ===
Tappin signed with the Houston Gamblers of the USFL on December 16, 2022. He was released on April 9, 2023.

Tappin announced his retirement from football on February 2, 2024.

== Personal life ==
Tappin maintained a 4.0 GPA throughout high school at Windsor. In 2019, he graduated from California State University, Sacramento with a B.S. degree in Civil Engineering. While training for and playing professional football, Tappin simultaneously works as an engineering technician for Brelje & Race Consulting Engineers, where he focuses in structural engineering and water resources, specifically water resource distribution system projects. His specific areas of interest in engineering include bridge design, water resources, and land development. He is currently pursuing his Engineer in Training (EIT) certification on the track to earn a Professional Engineering (PE) license.
