= Mark West Union School District =

School district in California, United States

Location
- 305 Mark West Springs Rd. Santa Rosa, California 95404 United States

District information
- Established: 1868
- Schools: 4
- NCES District ID: 062400

Students and staff
- Students: 1,469
- Teachers: 60.60 on FTE basis)
- Staff: 115.10 on FTE basis)
- Student–teacher ratio: 24.24

Other information
- Website: mwusd.org

Mark West Union School District (MWUSD) is a public school district formed in 1868 in the Mark West/Larkfield area of Santa Rosa in Sonoma County, California. The school district is named for the area it serves, which is named for William Marcus West.

The district includes the census-designated places of Larkfield-Wikiup and Fulton and small portions of the Santa Rosa and Windsor municipalities.

== Schools and programs ==
- Mark West Elementary School (K–6), opened in 1868 and serving more than 400 students in 2010–11.
- John B. Riebli Elementary School (K–6), opened in August 1992 and serving more than 500 students in 2010–11.
- San Miguel Elementary School (K–6), serving more than 375 students.
- Mark West Charter School (7–8), a charter school serving more than 150 students.

In addition, MWUSD offers a home study program for students in grades 7 and 8.
