= Mahnke =

Mahnke is a surname. Notable people with the surname include:

- Aaron Mahnke, American podcaster
- Claudia Mahnke, German mezzo-soprano
- Dietrich Mahnke (1884–1939), German philosopher and historian of mathematics
- Doug Mahnke, American comic book artist and penciller

== See also ==
- Mahnke House, a historical residential building located in Des Moines, Iowa, United States
- Mahnke Peak, a mountain in Mendocino County, California, United States
