= Rancho San Miguel (West) =

Coordinates: 38.49°N 122.78°W

Rancho San Miguel was a 6,663-acre (26.96 km^{2}) Mexican land grant in present-day Sonoma County, California given in 1840 by Governor Juan B. Alvarado to William Marcus West. The grant was located north of present-day Santa Rosa, between Mark West Creek and Santa Rosa Creek, and encompassed present-day Mark West and Mark West Springs.

== History ==
William Mark West (d.1849), a Scot, came to Sonoma in 1832, soon after marrying Guadalupe Vasquez, a niece of General Vallejo in Santa Cruz, Mexico. Mark West built an adobe and established a trading post and post office near the stream which now bears his name.

Mark West died in 1849, leaving his land to his wife and seven children (Maria Luisa Del Carmet, Mark, Juan, William, Charles, Adelaide, and Chata). General Vallejo administered the estate. A claim for Rancho San Miguel was filed with the Public Land Commission in 1852. The claim for six square leagues was rejected by the Land Commission in 1855, but confirmed by the US District Court in 1857. The US Attorney General filed an appeal with the case to the US Supreme Court. The Supreme Court accepted one and a half square leagues, and the grant was patented to Guadalupe Vasquez de West in 1865.
