= Maria Carrillo =

Maria Carrillo may refer to:

- Maria Carrillo High School, a public school established in Santa Rosa, California in 1996
- María Ygnacia López de Carrillo, grantee of Rancho Cabeza de Santa Rosa, grandmother of California's only Hispanic governor
