= Windsor Creek =

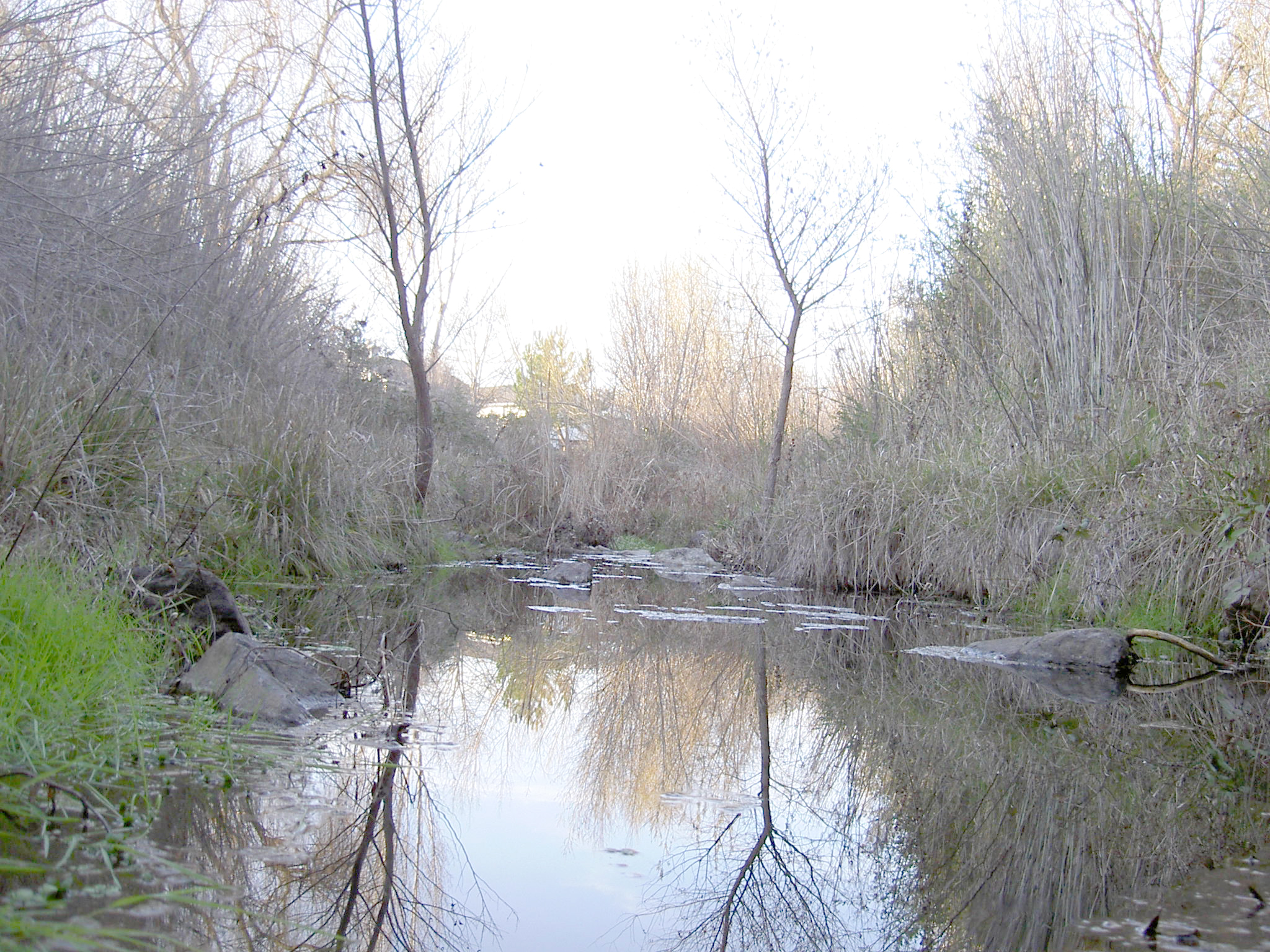
- Windsor Creek

- Location of the mouth of Windsor Creek in California

Location
- Country: United States
- State: California
- Region: Sonoma County
- City: Windsor, California

Physical characteristics
- Source
  - location: 5 mi (8 km) southeast of Healdsburg, California
  - coordinates: 38°35′26″N 122°47′38″W
- Mouth: Mark West Creek
  - location: 3 mi (5 km) northeast of Forestville
  - coordinates: 38°29′48″N 122°50′58″W

Basin features
- Tributaries
  - left: Pool Creek

Windsor Creek is an 8.8-mile-long (14.2 km) southward-flowing stream in Sonoma County, California, United States, which rises near Healdsburg, California, and feeds into Mark West Creek west of the Sonoma County Airport. Its waters reach the Pacific Ocean by way of the Russian River.

== Course ==
Windsor Creek rises about 5 miles (8 km) southeast of Healdsburg. It descends southward into the town of Windsor, paralleling Brooks Road to Hiram Lewis Park. It parallels Brooks Road South to U.S. Route 101, crossing under the freeway at milepost 29.5. It continues southwest through farmland to a confluence with Pool Creek east of Pratt Road. From there, it flows south to empty into Mark West Creek about 3 miles (5 km) northeast of Forestville.

== Watershed ==
The watershed is about 25 square miles (65 km^{2}), with a maximum elevation of about 800 feet (240 m) and a minimum elevation of about 50 feet (15 m). The creek is seasonal and is generally dry during the summer months. With increased urbanization in the Windsor area, some parts of the creek retain water in isolated pools through the summer, due to runoff from sprinklers and other urban sources.

== Pollution ==
The Community Clean Water Institute (CCWI) monitors pollutants in Windsor Creek and other Sonoma County streams. Their sampling showed that Windsor creek exceeded the North Coast Basin Plan Objectives for conductivity and dissolved oxygen in 2006. CCWI has also issued alerts for nitrates in Windsor Creek.

== Bridges ==
Windsor Creek is crossed by at least five bridges:

- at Old Redwood Highway, a 72-foot (22 m) prestressed concrete span built in 1995,
- at Windsor Road north of Wilson Lane, a 67-foot (20 m) concrete slab built in 1967,
- at Mark West Station Road, an 38-foot (12 m) concrete slab built in 1976,
- at U.S. Route 101, a 35-foot (11 m) concrete culvert built in 1962, and
- at Conde Lane east of Bell Avenue, a 26-foot (8 m) concrete culvert built in 1995.

== See also ==
- List of watercourses in the San Francisco Bay Area
