= Rancho San Miguel (disambiguation) =

Rancho San Miguel is a neighborhood in Walnut Creek, California.

Rancho San Miguel may also refer to these Mexican land grants in California:

- Rancho San Miguel (Noé), 1845, in San Francisco County
- Rancho San Miguel (Olivas), 1841, in Ventura County
- Rancho San Miguel (West), 1840, in Sonoma County
- Rancho Arroyo de Las Nueces y Bolbones or San Miguel, 1834, in Contra Costa County
