= Pyramid Ridge =

Mountain in Mendocino County, California, U.S.

- Location within California Location within the United States

Highest point
- Elevation: 3,520–3,560 ft (1,070–1,090 m)
- Prominence: 1,120 ft (340 m)
- Parent peak: Cow Mountain Ridge
- Isolation: 6.21 mi (9.99 km)
- Coordinates: 39.042176°N 123.058351°W

Geography
- Country: United States
- State: California
- Mendocino County, California: County
- Parent range: Mayacamas Mountains
- Topo map: Purdys Gardens O39123a1 1:24,000

Pyramid Ridge is a 3,520–3,560 feet (1,070–1,090 m) mountain in Mendocino County, California.

== Location ==
Pyramid Ridge is in Mendocino County, California, in the Mayacamas Mountains of the northern California Coast Ranges. It is 3,520–3,560 feet (1,070–1,090 m) high with a prominence of 1,120 feet (340 m). It has isolation of 6.21 miles (9.99 km) from Cow Mountain Ridge to the north. The ridge is 1 mile (1.6 km) long. The Köppen climate classification is: Csb : Warm-summer Mediterranean climate.

== Human activities ==
In November 2005 a program funded by the Joint Fire Services Program began on Pyramid Ridge to research fire treatments. 18 plots ranging from 3–10 acres (1.2–4.0 ha) in size were selected that contained knobcone pines that were dying off for an unknown reason. 3 plots of standing trees were burned, trees on 3 plots were cut and burned, and trees on 3 plots were cut and left to rot. The California Department of Forestry and Fire Protection was responsible for all the burning.

Pyramid Ridge is only accessible by ATV or horseback. It is known as a good area for deer hunting. It is in the South Cow Mountain OHV Recreation Area, and is traversed by Trail 19 of the area. As of 2016 informally developed trails led from the southeast, southwest and west segments of that trail, which were to be closed, barricaded and restored to a natural state to deter trespass on private property.

== Sources ==
- Johnson, Loyde; Wilson, Colin; Colfax, J. David (2005), Mendocino County Community Wildfire Protection Plan (PDF), Mendocino County Fire Chiefs’ Association & California Department of Forestry and Fire Protection
- Knight, Terry (12 August 2005), "Cow Mountain no pushover for Zone A deer", espn
- "Pyramid Ridge, California", Peakbagger
- "Pyramid Ridge", Geographic Names Information System, United States Geological Survey, United States Department of the Interior
- "Pyramid Ridge, Mendocino County, California, United States", Mindat
- Ukiah Field Office (2016), Cow Mountain Recreation Area Implementation Plan (PDF), Bureau of Land Management
