= Santa Rosa City Schools =

School district in Santa Rosa, California, United States

Santa Rosa City Schools are the combination of two school districts in Santa Rosa, California: the Santa Rosa Elementary School District (grades K-6) and the Santa Rosa High School District (grades 7–12). The combined districts have over 16,000 students in nine elementary schools, five middle schools, six high schools (including one alternative high school), one K-8 arts charter school, one 5-6 accelerated charter school, one Spanish language dual immersion charter school, one French language dual immersion charter school, and several child care programs. Eight other elementary school districts, Bellevue Union, Bennett Valley Union, Kenwood, Mark West Union, Piner-Olivet, Rincon Valley Union, Roseland Union, and Wright, feed into the high school district.

== School closures ==
In November 2024, the Santa Rosa City Schools District Board started to confront a $20 million deficit, which had to be met through staff cuts, school closures, and internal cuts.

In February 2025, the district board decided to close three elementary schools (Albert Biella, Brook Hill, and Steele Lane elementary schools) and three middle schools (Herbert Slater, Hillard Comstock, and Santa Rosa middle schools) which as a result would turn four high schools (Montgomery, Santa Rosa, Piner, and Elsie Allen high schools) into K7-12 schools.

In March 2025, due to controversial mass firings at Maria Carrillo High School, 1/13th of the student body and 56 staff at the school protested at the district's office demanding answers regarding the rationale for firing most of their administrative staff. Eventually, the protest was geared toward advocating the removal of Superintendent Dr. Daisy Morales.

With a 5-1 vote by the Santa Rosa City Schools Board of Trustees on Wednesday, April 22, 2025, they agreed to remove Superintendent Dr. Daisy Morales due to her unanimous no-confidence vote by 97% of faculty, a 4,700-person signed petition, and leadership throughout the school closures situation. As a result, the interim superintendent chosen was Lisa August, who was the Associate Superintendent for Santa Rosa City Schools' Business Services.

Due to the debt of over $25 million the Santa Rosa City Schools District has to cut $2.8 million by June and another $23 million by next school year or risk state takeover of the district. In response, the district has fast-tracked the merger for Rincon Valley Middle School and Maria Carrillo High School while the district takes pay cuts and plans to lay off at least 150 full-time school staff.

== Attendance area ==
The elementary school district includes the central portion of Santa Rosa. The high school district additionally includes almost all of the remainder of Santa Rosa, as well as a small portion of Windsor and the following census-designated places: Fulton, Kenwood, and Larkfield-Wikiup.

== Schools ==
List of some of the schools in the districts:

- Albert F. Biella Elementary School (Closed)
- Brook Hill Elementary School (Closed)
- Luther Burbank Elementary School
- Hidden Valley Elementary School
- Helen Lehman Elementary School
- Abraham Lincoln Elementary School
- James Monroe Elementary School (see Monroe District)
- Proctor Terrace Elementary School
- Steele Lane Elementary School (Pending closure)
- Hilliard Comstock Middle School (Pending closure)
- Rincon Valley Middle School
- Santa Rosa Junior High School (Formerly Santa Rosa Middle School)
- Montgomery Junior High School (Formerly Herbert Slater Middle School)
- Santa Rosa High School (K7-12)
- Montgomery High School (K7-12)
- Elsie Allen High School (Pending merge into K7-12)
- Piner High School (Pending merge into K7-12)
- Maria Carrillo High School (Pending merge into K7-12)
- Ridgway High School (Continuation)
- Santa Rosa Charter for the Arts (K-8) (Formerly Fremont Elementary School)
- Santa Rosa Accelerated Charter School
- Santa Rosa French-American Charter School
- Cesar Chavez Language Academy

== Administration ==
The District is run by a board of education, which is elected based on the High School District boundaries. There are seven trustees, each elected for four-year terms. Some are elected in the presidential election cycle, and some are elected in the off-year cycle. The trustee areas were created in late 2018 at which time the at-large election process was abandoned.

=== Elementary School Administration ===
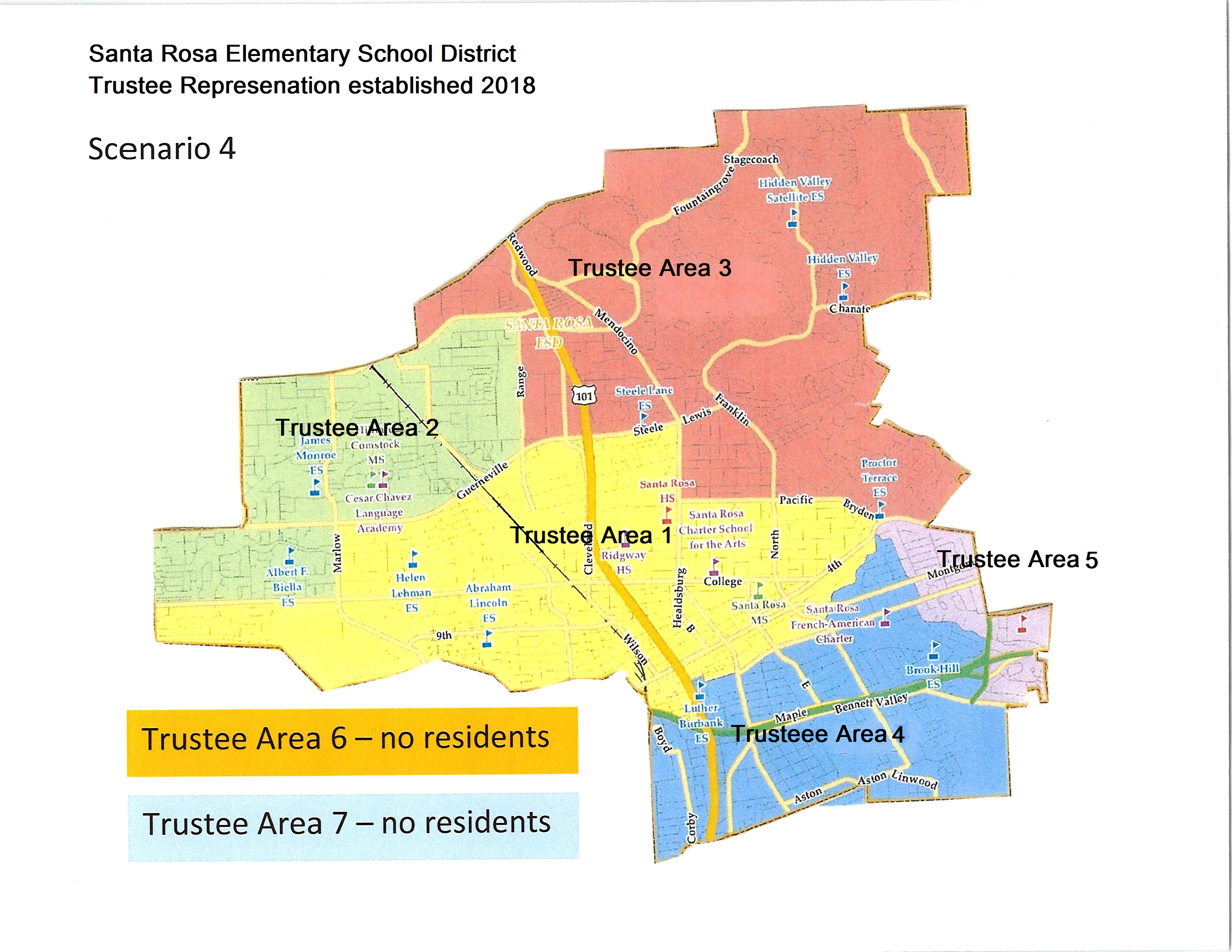
Santa Rosa Elementary School Boundaries 2018 with Trustee Areas

The same board of education administers the Elementary School District. Two of the trustees are prohibited from residing in the Elementary District. The other trustees may or may not live in the Elementary District. The 2020-2022 Board has four trustees who do not live in the Elementary District and three trustees who live in the District.

== See also ==
- List of school districts in Sonoma County, California
