= Cow Mountain Ridge =

Ridge in California, U.S.

- Location within California Location within the United States

Highest point
- Elevation: 3,572 ft (1,089 m)
- Prominence: 612 ft (187 m)
- Isolation: 2.37 mi (3.81 km) to Cow Mountain
- Coordinates: 39.1307260°N 123.0766681°W

Geography
- Country: United States
- State: California
- County: Lake County
- Parent range: Mayacamas Mountains
- Topo map: Cow Mountain O39123b1 1:24,000

Cow Mountain Ridge is a ridge in Lake County, California, and Mendocino County, California. It joins Cow Mountain from the south.

== Location ==
Cow Mountain Ridge is in the Mayacamas Mountains of the northern California Coast Ranges. It is in Lake and Mendocino counties. Clear Lake is to the east and the Russian River Valley and Ukiah are to the west. Eight Mile Valley on the east side of Cow Mountain Ridge holds a variety of native species in grasslands, oak woodlands, and areas of chaparral.

== Name ==
Cow Mountain and Cow Mountain Ridge got their names from longhorn cattle introduced around 1839 by Salvador Vallejo and later ranched by Ben Kelsey and Andrew Kelsey, which left many rogue cattle roaming the countryside. When settlers arrived in the land around Clear Lake in 1853, they did not want the longhorn cattle to breed with their exotic cattle bred for meat production, so they began a program of shooting the longhorns. Cow Mountain was one of the last refuges for the longhorns, but they had been eliminated by the 1870s by the Hurt family of Scotts Valley.

== Terrain ==
Cow Mountain Ridge is a north-south trending ridge that extends about 6 miles (9.7 km) north from Lost Valley to Cow Mountain. It has an elevation of 3,572 feet (1,089 m) and clean prominence of 612 feet (187 m), with isolation of 2.37 miles (3.81 km) from Cow Mountain to the north-northeast. The ridge extends 3.5 miles (5.6 km) south from Cow Mountain to Lyons Valley. Mendo Rock Road runs along the top of the ridge. From Mendo Rock there are dramatic views in all directions. The highest point on the ridge is a hill at 3,572 feet (1,089 m) on which there are radio antennas.

== Sources ==
- "Cow Mountain Ridge/Mendo Rock", SummitPost
- "Cow Mountain Ridge", Geographic Names Information System, United States Geological Survey, United States Department of the Interior
- Lundquist, Erica (February 2010), Scotts Creek Watershed Assessment (PDF), Scotts Creek Watershed Council
- Sanger, David, "Cow Mountain Ridge, California", peakbagger
- US Board on Geographic Names (1960), Decisions on Names in the United States, Department of the Interior
- Vishnu (Spring 2002), "Fieldtrips" (PDF), Sanhedrin Chapter Newsletter, California Native Plant Society
