= Arroyo Seco (Sonoma County) =

Stream in Sonoma County, California

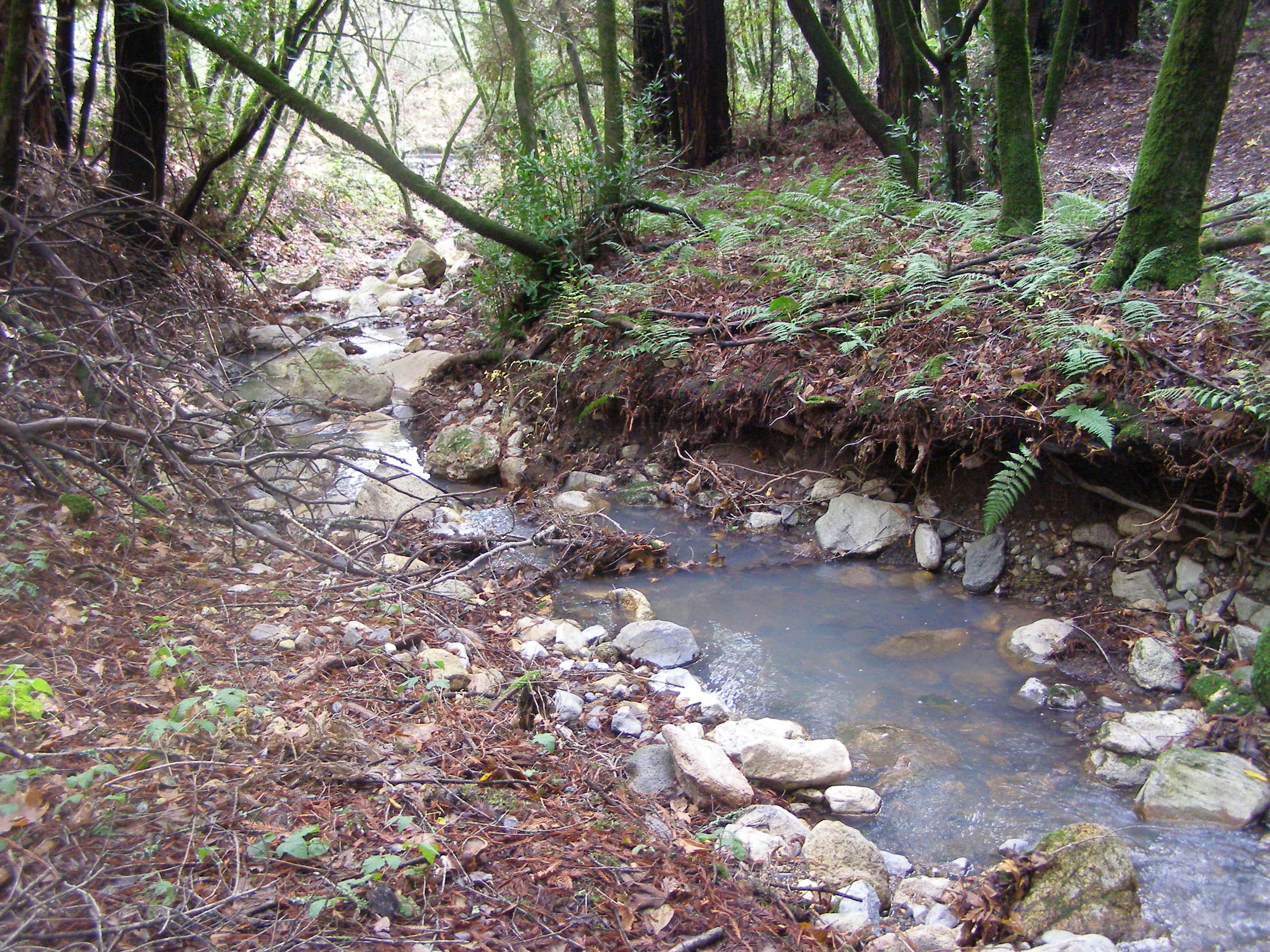
- Middle reach of Arroyo Seco Creek

- Location of the mouth of Arroyo Seco Creek in California

Location
- Country: United States
- State: California
- Region: Sonoma County
- City: Sonoma, California

Physical characteristics
- Source
  - location: 4 mi (6 km) northeast of Sonoma, California
  - coordinates: 38°20′8″N 122°25′3″W
  - elevation: 1,345 ft (410 m)
- Mouth: Schell Creek
  - location: 4 mi (6 km) south of Sonoma, California
  - coordinates: 38°14′42″N 122°26′5″W
  - elevation: 13 ft (4.0 m)
- Basin size: 11.4 sq mi (30 km^{2})

Basin features
- Tributaries
  - left: Haraszthy Creek

Arroyo Seco is a 6.9-mile-long (11.1 km) tributary stream to Schell Creek in southern Sonoma County, California, United States. In Spanish arroyo seco means "dry stream." Arroyo Seco Creek drains a portion of the western slopes of the southern Mayacamas Mountains. Its 11.4-square-mile (30 km^{2}) watershed, along with the entire Mayacamas mountain block, was formed in the Miocene era by volcanic action and with tectonic uplift about 12 million years ago.

Soils of the immediate streambed and its vicinity are classified as the riverwash series, recent deposition of sands and gravels.

Arroyo Seco Creek springs near the Napa County line about 4 mi (6 km) northeast of Sonoma, California. It flows southward, emerging from near Sonoma Valley Hospital. After a confluence with Haraszthy Creek, it crosses under State Route 12 near Schellville, California, where it flows into Schell Creek. Schell Creek discharges to a network of sloughs that eventually empty into Sonoma Creek, which in turn empties into the Napa Sonoma Marsh and San Pablo Bay.

== See also ==
- California oak woodland
- List of watercourses in the San Francisco Bay Area
- Miwok
