= Mayacamas Mountains =

Mountain range in northwestern California, United States

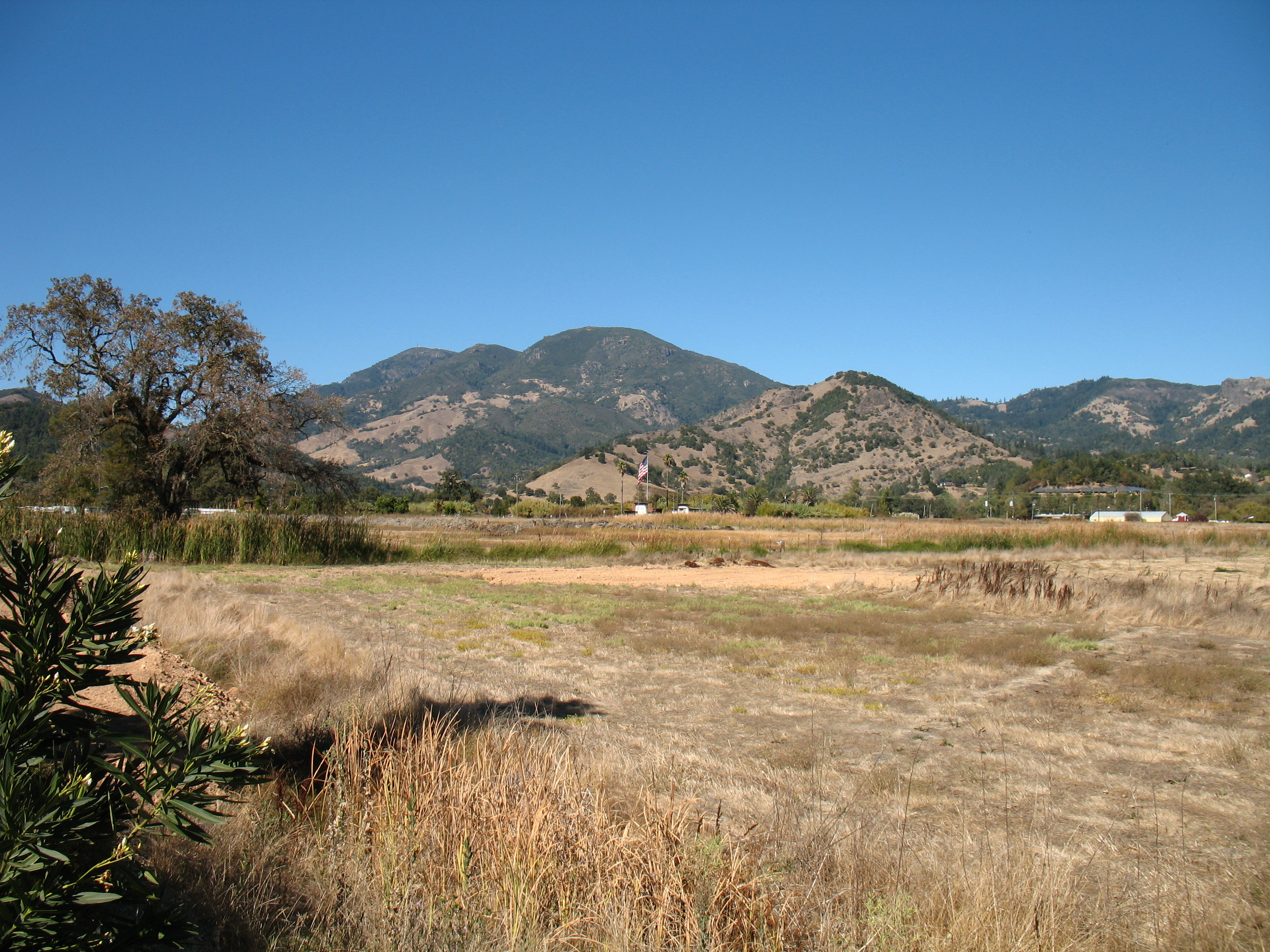
- Mount Saint Helena

Highest point
- Elevation: 4,724 ft (1,440 m)
- Coordinates: 38°48′27″N 122°44′26″W

Dimensions
- Length: 52 mi (84 km) northwest–southeast

Naming
- Etymology: Wappo language

Geography
- Location within California
- Country: United States
- State: California
- Range coordinates: 38°40′9.663″N 122°37′59.948″W
- Parent range: California Coast Ranges

The Mayacamas Mountains are located in northwestern California in the United States. The mountain range is part of the Northern Inner Coast Ranges, of the California Coast Ranges System.

== Geography ==
The Mayacamas Mountains are located south of the Mendocino Range, west of Clear Lake, and east of Ukiah in Mendocino and Lake Counties, and extend south into Napa and Sonoma Counties. The range stretches for 52 mi (80 km) in a northwest–southeasterly direction.

Mountains in the range include:

Name	Height		Coordinates	Notes
Name	ft	m	Coordinates	Notes
Cobb Mountain	4,720+	1,439+	38.8074°N 122.7405°W	
Mount Saint Helena	4,342	1,323	38.6693°N 122.6335°W	Peakbagger places it in the Wine Country Ranges
Mount Konocti	4,299	1,310	38.9746°N 122.7659°W	
Mount Hannah	3,978	1,212	38.8873°N 122.7463°W	
Cow Mountain	3,920+	1,195+	39.1634°N 123.0506°W	
Boggs Mountain	3,720+	1,134+	38.8155°N 122.6822°W	
Seigler Mountain	3,680+	1,122+	38.8738°N 122.7098°W	
Mahnke Peak	3,652	1,113	38.8629°N 122.8544°W	
Cow Mountain Ridge	3,572	1,089	39.1309°N 123.0768°W	
Pyramid Ridge	3,520+	1,073+	39.0420°N 123.0584°W	
Peak 3480	3,480+	1,061+	38.7666°N 122.7320°W	
Mount Hood	2,733	833	38.4599°N 122.5534°W	More commonly known as Hood Mountain
Bald Mountain	2,730	832	38.2727°N 122.3034°W	
Harbin Mountain	2,585	788	38.7919°N 122.6461°W	Sub-peak of Boggs Mountain

The range's highest point is Cobb Mountain, at 4,724 ft (1,440 m) in elevation, located in the central section. There are several other peaks over 2,500 ft (762 m), including Mount Saint Helena and Hood Mountain. These peaks are sufficiently high to retain some snow cover in winter.

Several streams rise in the Mayacamas Mountains including Mark West Creek, Sonoma Creek, Calabazas Creek, Arroyo Seco Creek, Putah Creek, and Santa Rosa Creek.

Natural history

Around ten million years ago, during pre-historic times (Miocene), the mountains are thought to have been densely forested in Mendocino Cypress (Cupressus pygmaea).

The Mayacamas Mountains currently support California mixed evergreen forest and California interior chaparral and woodlands habitats.

== Naming ==
According to Gudde:

Mayacamas Mountains [Sonoma, Lake Cos.] The mountain chain, forming the divide of the headwaters of Russian River and Clear Lake, was named for the Native American tribe on the west slope, probably a division of the Yuki tribe. According to Barrett (Pomo, p. 269), there was a Yukian Wappo village, Maiya'kma, one mile south of present day Calistoga. Serro de los Mallacomes (Mount Saint Helena) is shown on a diseño of the Rancho Caymus grant (1836). Later the name appears in the title and on the diseños of the Rancho Mallacomes y Plano de Agua Caliente or Moristul land grant, dated September 3, 1841, and October 11 and 14, 1843.

The present spelling is used in the Statutes of 1850 (pp. 60 f.). Although this version was also used by the Whitney Survey, confusion persists to the present day. The Geographic Board (Fifth Report) decided for Miyakma, but in 1941 it reversed this decision in favor of Mayacmas ('not Miyakma, Cobb Mountain Range, Malacomas, Mayacamas, nor St. Helena Range'). The stream is still called Maacama Creek.

The spelling Mayacamas is listed as an alternate name by the Board of Geographic Names.

== Geothermal power ==
Located in the Mayacamas mountain range is The Geysers, the world's largest and most developed geothermal field. It consists of more than 22 power plants scattered across an area of about 45 square miles (78 km2). The Geysers spans the Lake, Sonoma, and Mendocino counties in California, and provides energy to those counties. The electrical energy is generated when dry steam is pumped from geothermal reservoirs through turbines.

== See also ==
- Mark West Springs
- Mayacamas Vineyards
- Snell Valley
- Natural history of the California Coast Ranges
