= Montgomery High School (Santa Rosa, California) =

Public high school in Santa Rosa, California, U.S.

Location
- 1250 Hahman Drive; Santa Rosa, California 95405; United States
- Coordinates: 38°26′24″N 122°41′03″W

Information
- Type: Public high school & Middle School
- Established: 1958
- School district: Santa Rosa City Schools
- Principal: April Santos
- Teaching staff: 77.18 (FTE)
- Grades: 9–12
- Enrollment: 1,433 (2023-2024)
- Student to teacher ratio: 20.37
- Color
- Team name: Viking
- Website: www.montgomeryhighschool.com

Montgomery High School & Montgomery Junior High School is a public high school & Junior high located in Santa Rosa, California. It is part of the Santa Rosa High School & Middle School District, which is itself part of Santa Rosa City Schools.

== History ==
Montgomery High School was named after Bill Montgomery. Montgomery is considered the first person from the city of Santa Rosa to have died in World War II. William "Billy" Montgomery was killed at Pearl Harbor on December 7, 1941, while serving aboard the battleship USS California.

On March 1, 2023, a 16-year-old student was stabbed to death by another student on the school’s campus.

In February 2025, the Santa Rosa City School District Board decided to make Montgomery High School into a K7-12 school taking in middle schoolers who were expected to go to Herbert Slater Middle School by June 2026.

Due to the closure of Herbert Slater Middle School, a two-story new math and science building has been constructed to make room for incoming 7th and 8th grade students primarily from the late Herbert Slater Middle School now Montgomery Junior High School.

== Curriculum ==
Montgomery participates in the International Baccalaureate Organization as an IB World School, providing the IB Diploma Programme as well as the full complement of classes available to juniors and seniors. Montgomery High School has been an IB World School since July 1995.

Montgomery High School houses an elective called Advancement Via Individual Determination or AVID. This 4-year elective course is geared towards preparing students to become first-generation college students within their families through academic support programs and access to aid.

Montgomery High School is involved in a dual-enrollment program with Santa Rosa Junior College allowing students to take junior college courses for college and high school credits.

== Awards and recognition ==
During the 1990–1991 school year, Montgomery High School was recognized with the Blue Ribbon School Award of Excellence by the United States Department of Education, the highest award an American school can receive.

Montgomery was recognized as a California Distinguished School by the California Department of Education in 1990.

== Demographics ==
=== 2023–2024: Senior High ===
- 1,433 students:

Hispanic	African American	Asian	Pacific Islander	White, non-Hispanic	Multiracial	American Indian
54.7%	2.9%	3.1%	2.0%	30.4%	5.0%	0.5%

=== 2023 - 2024: Junior High ===
- 690 students:

Hispanic	African American	Asian	White, non-Hispanic	Pacific Islander	Multiracial	American Indian
64.9%	1.2%	2.6%	22.2%	2.6%	5.4%	0.7%

== Notable alumni ==
- Jack Fimple (born 1959), catcher for Los Angeles Dodgers and California Angels from 1983-1987.
- Melba Pattillo Beals (born 1941), member of the Little Rock Nine, a group of African-American students who were the first to integrate Little Rock Central High School; attended Montgomery for her senior year.
- Kim Conley (born 1986), Olympic middle and long-distance runner.
- Mel Gray (born 1948), wide receiver for the St. Louis Cardinals from 1971 to 1982.
- Sara Hall (born 1983), professional American middle-distance runner.
- Dan Hicks (1941–2016), singer in Dan Hicks & His Hot Licks and The Charlatans
- Brandon Hyde (born 1973), Manager of the Baltimore Orioles (2019– )
- Mark Illsley (born 1958), writer & director of Happy, Texas
- Koa Misi (born 1987), outside linebacker for the Miami Dolphins.
- Nancy Ling Perry (1947–1974), member of the Symbionese Liberation Army.
- Scott Ware (born 1983), former safety on the football team of the University of Southern California and the practice squad of the Indianapolis Colts
