= Elsie Allen High School =

Coordinates: 38°24′20″N 122°44′06″W

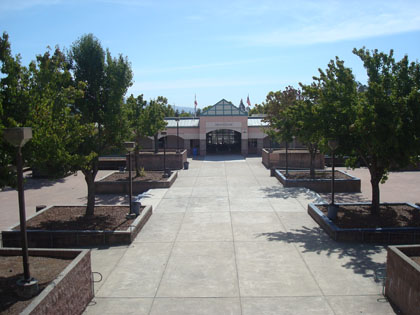

Location
- 599 Bellevue Ave; Santa Rosa, California 95407; United States

Information
- Type: Public secondary
- Established: 1994
- School district: Santa Rosa City Schools
- Principal: Casey Cunningham
- Teaching staff: 58.37 (FTE)
- Grades: 9–12
- Enrollment: 980 (2023-24)
- Student to teacher ratio: 18.07
- Colors: midnight blue, silver and white
- Mascot: Lobo
- Website: elsieallen.srcschools.org

Elsie Allen High School (EAHS) is a high school located in Santa Rosa, California at 599 Bellevue Ave. It is part of the Santa Rosa High School District, part of Santa Rosa City Schools. The school was named after Pomo basket weaver and educator Elsie Allen.

== History ==
Prior to the opening of the school, the Elsie Allen High School Planning Committee was formed at Lawrence Cook Junior High, which would serve as the primary feeder school. The committee organized a vote of the student body to choose a mascot and school colors. The students voted to become the Lobos. Other choices included the Aztecs and the Eagles, which came in at a close second. As for school colors they voted for midnight blue, silver and white.

Elsie Allen High School was founded in 1994, and the first class graduated in 1997. The University Center at Elsie Allen High School is the recipient of the prestigious 2010 California School Boards Association Golden Bell Award.

In 2009, the University Center boasted the only Presidential Scholar ever to come from a Sonoma County public school; Jesse Nee-Vogelman earned perfect scores in four portions of the SAT. In 2011, parents, faculty and community members came together to support Elsie Allen High School students by creating the Elsie Allen High School Foundation. The non-profit Foundation supports students by providing mentors, job shadows, career days, and scholarships to college and trade schools.

In 2017, the Elsie Allen High Foundation received a $250,000 grant to help set up a $1 million endowment fund to provide Elise Allen High student scholarships for decades to come.

In February 2025, the Santa Rosa City School District Board decided to make Elsie Allen High School into a specialized K7-12 school taking in middle schoolers by June 2026.

On February 26, 2025, a 15-year-old student was stabbed multiple times by another student on campus.

== Curriculum ==
Elsie Allen High School also offers Advanced Placement (AP) courses and exams meaning the school has met the College Board's requirements to offer college-level courses to high school students.

Elsie Allen High School houses an elective called Advancement Via Individual Determination or AVID. This 4-year elective course is geared towards preparing students to become first-generation college students within their families through academic support programs and access to aid.

Elsie Allen High School High School is involved in a dual-enrollment program with Santa Rosa Junior College allowing students to take junior college courses for college and high school credits.

Unlike other Santa Rosa City Schools, Elsie Allen High School has a University center that allows students to take courses at Sonoma State University for college and high school credits. The University Center at Elsie Allen High School guarantees admission to Sonoma State University and offers an annual savings of $10,000 in college tuition for students accepted into the program.

== Campus ==
The campus was also home to Midrose High School, an alternative school. Midrose was located on the north side of the campus. The school was officially closed effective June 30, 2016.

Elsie Allen High School is also home to a Santa Rosa Community Health Center that provides specialized health services for teenagers.

== Extracurricular activities ==
=== Clubs ===
Elsie Allen has a number of student clubs, including the California Scholarship Federation, Rotary Interact, Key Club, and a Gay-Straight Alliance.

=== Journalism and yearbook ===
The school yearbook is called Phoenix and has been published annually in the spring since 1995. The school newspaper goes by the name The Tracker and has been published continuously since the fall 1994. The school graduated its first class in 1997

=== Sports ===
Elsie Allen has an American football team. Starting in 2011, they stopped playing in the North Bay League and became an independent team. The school also has a men's club rugby team. Elsie Allen also has girl's flag football, boys and girls basketball, boys and girls soccer, baseball, softball, cross country, and track and field. There is also badminton, swim team and girls tennis.

=== Performing arts ===
The Arts Program has twice won the Congressional Art Competition. The Drama Program has received a multitude of awards over the past several years for acting, directing, and overall performance, as well as the top award for playwriting at the annual Lenaea Festival. The Elsie Allen High Drum Line performs regularly for visiting dignitaries at businesses and community events.

== Demographics ==
=== 2023-2024 ===
- 980 students:

Hispanic	African American	Asian	Pacific Islander	White, non-Hispanic	Multiracial	American Indian
85.1%	1.5%	2.9%	0.5%	6.4%	2.0%	0.8%

== Former principals ==
Carnell Edwards: Carnell Edwards was the founding principal of Elsie Allen High School. He was hired in 1994 to open the school, which was the first new school in nearly three decades.

At the very first Elsie Allen graduation assembly, Edwards teamed up with campus supervisor Fannie "Mama Lobo" Reece-Richardson to lip sync "Ain't No Mountain High Enough" by Marvin Gaye and Tammy Terrell.

In 1999, Edwards was named High School Principal of the Year by the Sonoma County Association of School Administrators. In 2001, Edwards left Elsie Allen High School, the school he helped develop, to become the director of curriculum for Lompoc schools in Santa Barbara County.

Mary Gail Stablein: Mary Gail Stablein took over as principal in the Fall of 2001. In 2018, principal Mary Gail Stablein retired after serving as Elsie Allen High School's principal for 16 years. Stablein focused on preparing students for careers and higher education, boosting on campus the number of college-prep courses, student support services and job training and scholarship opportunities.

Gabriel Albavera: Gabriel Albavera, a former Elsie Allen assistant principal and counselor, took over as the third principal of Elsie Allen High School in the Fall of 2018 and was one of the longest serving faculty staff on campus. Gabriel Albavera was put on paid leave on February 25, 2025, after a student was stabbed on campus. After closer consideration, the school board fired him and replaced him with Elizabeth Gordon-Stoll. Former Assistant Principal Casey Cunningham was hired as principal in the fall of 2025.
