= Rincon Valley Union Elementary School District =

School district in Santa Rosa, California, United States

Rincon Valley Union School District

Location
- 1000 Yulupa Ave. Santa Rosa, California 95405 Rincon Valley Neighborhood, Santa Rosa, CA. United States

District information
- Grades: Kindergarten-8th
- Established: 1953
- Superintendent: Amy Jones
- Schools: 10

Students and staff
- Students: 3,112

Other information
- Website: www.rvusd.org

Rincon Valley Union School District is a public school district in Sonoma County, California, United States.

The district includes portions of Santa Rosa and unincorporated areas. It feeds into Santa Rosa High School District.

It operates eight elementary schools and two charter middle schools, all in the vicinity of Santa Rosa:

- Austin Creek Elementary School
- Binkley Elementary School
- Madrone Elementary School
- Sequoia Elementary School
- Spring Lake Middle School (Formerly Spring Creek Elementary School)
- Spring Creek Matanzas School: Matanzas Campus (4–6)
- Village Elementary School
- Whited Elementary School
- Rincon Valley Charter School: Matanzas Campus
- Rincon Valley Charter School: Sequoia Campus

The Rincon Valley Charter School for 7th and 8th grade students has two campuses, one on the same campus as Matanzas Elementary School and one on the same campus as Sequoia Elementary School.

In 2004 the district's $23.9 million ($40,739,000 when adjusted for inflation) bond proposal was approved by voters.
