= Windsor Unified School District =

School district in Windsor, California, United States

Address
- 9291 Old Redwood Highway Windsor, California, 95492; United States

District information
- Grades: K–12
- Superintendent: Jeremy Decker
- Schools: Windsor High School
- NCES District ID: 0600034

Students and staff
- Students: 4,700 (2020–2021)
- Teachers: 233.62 (FTE)
- Staff: 262.33 (FTE)
- Student–teacher ratio: 20.12:1

Other information
- Website: www.wusd.org

Windsor Unified School District or WUSD is the public school district in Windsor, California. The district serves 5,400 students from kindergarten through high school. Its 2013 API score was 776.

== Schools ==
There are 7 schools in the district:

- Windsor High School (Grades 9-12)
- Windsor Oaks Academy (Grades 10-12)
- Windsor Middle School (Grades 6-8)
- Cali Calmécac Language Academy (Grades K-8)
- Brooks Elementary School (Grades 3-5)
- Mattie Washburn Elementary School (Grades K-2)

In 2018/2019 School year it was decided that Windsor Creek Elementary School (Grades 2-3) will be closing because of lack of students. Grade 2 was transferred to Mattie Washburn Elementary School and Grade 3 was transferred to Brooks Elementary School.

Windsor Unified is also the lead agency in the North County Consortium, which serves students with special needs in 7 area school districts.

== Awards ==
Windsor Unified School District earned two California Golden Bell Awards from the California School Boards Association: the first in 1999 and the second in 2008.

Five of Windsor's schools have been recognized as California Distinguished Schools by the California State Board of Education.

- 2009: Windsor Middle School
- 2006: Brooks Elementary School
- 2005: Windsor High School
- 2004: Windsor Creek Elementary School
- 2001: Windsor Middle School

Windsor's alternative high school, Windsor Oaks Academy, was named a Model Continuation High School in 2012 by the California State Superintendent of Public Instruction.

== See also ==
- List of school districts in Sonoma County, California
