= Piner High School =

Piner Junior Senior High School

Location
- 1700 Fulton Rd. Santa Rosa, California 95403; United States; 38°27′43″N 122°45′59″W

Information
- Type: Public secondary
- Established: September 12, 1966
- Superintendent: Monica Thomas, Ed.D
- Principal: Andrea Correia
- Teaching staff: 68.12 (FTE)
- Enrollment: 1,384 (2023–2024)
- Student to teacher ratio: 20.32
- Colors: Maroon, gold & white
- Mascot: Prospector Pete
- Website: phs.srcschools.org

Piner Junior Senior High School (PJSHS) is a public high school in Santa Rosa, California, United States. It is part of the Santa Rosa High School District, which is itself a component of Santa Rosa City Schools.

== History ==
Piner High School was built in 1966 in Santa Rosa, California. Piner High School opened with 9th, 10th, and 11th grades in the fall of 1966. It did not become a four-year high school until the early 1990s. The class of 1968 was the first graduating class in the school's history. Before the first graduating class, William McCrossen, an adult, finished his high school education and was, in fact, the very first graduate of Piner High School. The class of 1975 was the last of the four-year courses until 1996 when Piner was re-established as a four-year high school to alleviate overcrowding of local middle schools.

In February 2025, the Santa Rosa City School District Board decided to make Piner High School into a K7-12 school taking in middle schoolers who were expected to go to Hilliard Comstock Middle School by June 2026. Piner started the 2026-2027 school year as Piner Junior Senior High School. The new Junior High building ribbon cutting was held on August 10, 2026.

== Curriculum ==
Piner High School also offers Advanced Placement (AP) courses and exams meaning the school has met the College Board's requirements to offer college-level courses to high school students.

Piner High School is involved in a dual-enrollment program with Santa Rosa Junior College allowing students to take junior college courses for college and high school credits.

== Athletics ==
Piner High School is a member of the North Bay League Oak and Redwood Divisions of the North Coast Section of the California Interscholastic Federation.

Piner High School offers a wide variety of sports including: football, volleyball, Cross Country, Track and Field, wrestling, badminton, Softball, swimming, boys' and girls' tennis, boys' and girls' golf, and boys' and girls' soccer, and boys' and girls' basketball.

== Demographics ==
=== 2023-2024 ===
- 1,384 students:

Hispanic	African American	Asian	Pacific Islander	White, non-Hispanic	Multiracial	American Indian
75.7%	2.0%	4.3%	0.8%	11.3%	4.0%	0.7%

== Notable alumni ==
- Adrián González, football player for MLS Next Pro and Mexico's national youth team

== See also ==
- List of school districts in Sonoma County, California
- Santa Rosa City Schools
