= Maria Carrillo High School =

Coordinates: 38°28′50″N 122°39′32″W

Location
- 6975 Montecito Boulevard; Santa Rosa, California 95409

Information
- Founded: 1996
- Superintendent: Lisa August
- Principal: Amy Wiese
- Teaching staff: 72.88 (FTE)
- Grades: 9-12
- Enrollment: 1,584 (2024-2025)
- Student to teacher ratio: 21.73
- Language: English
- Area: Sonoma County
- Colors: Forest green, Vegas gold, and black
- Mascot: Puma
- Team name: Pumas
- Website: http://www.mariacarrillohighschool.com

Maria Carrillo High School is a public high school in Santa Rosa, California, United States. It is managed by the Santa Rosa City Schools district. It opened in 1996 and is in Santa Rosa's Rincon Valley neighborhood.

== History ==
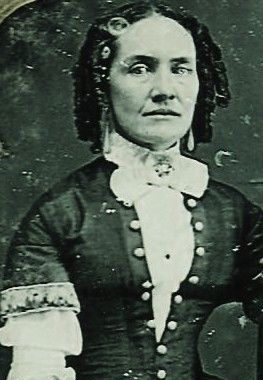
Doña María Ygnacia López de Carrillo, founder of Santa Rosa and namesake of Maria Carrillo High School.

Maria Carrillo High School opened in 1996 and was named after María Ygnacia López de Carrillo. The school has a statue of the branding iron she used as her land grant in a planter with a dedicated plaque.

Maria Carrillo High School (MCHS), a California Distinguished High School 2013, is one of five comprehensive high schools in the Santa Rosa City Schools district. MCHS currently enrolls 1,550 students in grades 9-12. The school received its first regular accreditation by the Western Association of Schools and Colleges in 1999.

After the district experienced controversial school closures, on March 13, 2025, an emergency staff meeting detailed the amount of staff who were getting laid off due to school mass firings including all of the principals and most of the counselors. In return, the school staged a protest the next day at the district's building which led the school to have 56 staff call absent and 15/16th of the student body absent by the end of March 14, 2025.

Santa Rosa City Schools plans on fast-tracking the merger of Rincon Valley Middle School into Maria Carrillo High School by Fall of 2027 to make up for the budget deficit and looming state takeover.

== Curriculum ==
Maria Carrillo follows the curriculum mandated by the Santa Rosa City Schools district. The school offers English, fine arts, mathematics, physical education, social sciences, and science classes. The latter include biology, chemistry, zoology, physics, and physical science. The school has a culinary program, where students learn cooking skills and compete for awards at local Santa Rosa restaurants.

Maria Carrillo High School also offers Advanced Placement (AP) courses and exams meaning the school has met the College Board's requirements to offer college-level courses to high school students.

Maria Carrillo High School is involved in a dual-enrollment program with Santa Rosa Junior College allowing students to take junior college courses for college and high school credits.

== Extracurricular activities ==
=== Fine Arts ===
Maria Carrillo High School has an ENCORE arts program which offers many arts classes such as art, ceramics, dance, band, orchestra, mariachi, jazz, and choir.

=== Sports ===
The school has girls' and boys' basketball teams. In November 2011, the girls' basketball coach resigned after being accused of bullying team members throughout his career at the school. There is a track and field team, which is part of the North Coast Section competition field. There is also a baseball team, which, as of 2004, were the two-time North Coast Section champions. The school also has other sports teams, including football, volleyball, Cross Country, wrestling, badminton, swimming, boys' and girls' tennis, boys' and girls' golf, and boys' and girls' soccer.

=== California Scholarship Federation ===
California Scholarship Federation has a chapter within Maria Carrillo High School. This chapter's purpose is to recognize students who have outstanding academic achievement as well as service to the school or community. This chapter which is also a club at the school offers many benefits to students such as recognition in college and visitations to university campuses.

=== Journalism & Yearbook ===
Maria Carrillo High School has a student newspaper operated and run by students. Journalism is an elective course where students learn how to operate a newspaper, be journalists, and write articles. The school's newspaper "The Puma Prensa" features student articles ranging from local to national topics. Alongside the school's paper, another course Yearbook is offered which allows students to contribute directly to making the school's yearbook through photography, writing, and interviewing.

=== Puma Peers ===
Maria Carrillo High School has an advocacy class full of upperclassmen (juniors and seniors) who plan activities for the freshman class of that year and assist with recruitment efforts for incoming freshmen. Puma Peers is led by two teachers and was discharged from the Associated Student Body's control in the 2025 - 2026 school year. Puma Peers are chosen from the prior year through an application into a group assessment with fellow applicants.

=== Clubs ===
Maria Carrillo High School has over 68 clubs, each of which dives into certain subjects or hobbies or focuses on a specific subject, hobby, or academic area. Some clubs host assemblies or rallies each year to represent their clubs, historical days, or holidays with the help of their teacher advisor and their department.

== Demographics ==
=== 2023-2024 ===
- 1,585 students:

Hispanic	African American	Asian	Pacific Islander	White, non-Hispanic	Multiracial	American Indian
29.2%	1.8%	8.6%	0.9%	50.4%	6.5%	0.5%

== Notable alumni ==
Madeline Jane "Maya" DiRado, Class of 2010, is a former American competitive swimmer specializing in freestyle, butterfly, backstroke, and individual medley events. She won four medals in the 2016 Summer Olympics- two gold, one silver, and one bronze.

Kevin Jorgeson, Class of 2003, is an American mountain climber; he partnered with Tommy Caldwell to successfully free climb The Dawn Wall of El Capitan in Yosemite National Park.

Tristan Harris, Class of 2002, is the founder of the Center for Humane Technology, an organization focused on better aligning technology with the needs of humanity. Harris was featured on TED Talks and 60 Minutes.

Jake Scheiner (born 1995), a player for the Hiroshima Toyo Carp of Nippon Professional Baseball.

Andrew Vaughn, Class of 2016, baseball player, winner of the 2018 Golden Spikes Award with the University of California, was drafted third overall by the Chicago White Sox in the 2019 Major League Baseball draft.

Jenna Lowder (Transtrum), Class of 2006, all-time school record holder in the 200m and 400m in Track & Field. Went on to compete in NCAA Track & Field and Cross Country at BYU. Founder of Senita Athletics, a women’s athletic apparel company.
