= Cotati =

Cotati may refer to:

- Cotati, California, a city in the San Francisco Bay Area
- SS Cotati, built for the United States Shipping Board in 1919 and sunk in 1942 as Empire Avocet
- Cotati (comics), a fictional alien race in the Marvel Universe

== See also ==
- Coati, a New World mammal
