= Mahnke Peak =

Mountain in California, United States

- Location within California Location within the United States

Highest point
- Elevation: 3,652 ft (1,113 m)
- Prominence: 612 ft (187 m)
- Parent peak: Mount Hannah
- Isolation: 5.84 mi (9.40 km)
- Coordinates: 38.862877°N 122.854445°W

Geography
- Country: United States
- State: California
- Mendocino County, California: County
- Parent range: Mayacamas Mountains
- Topo map: The Geysers O38122g7 1:24,000

Mahnke Peak is a 3,652 feet (1,113 m) mountain in Mendocino County, California.

== Location ==
Mahnke Peak is in Mendocino County, California, in the Mayacamas Mountains of the northern California Coast Ranges. It is just south of the Mendocino County–Lake County boundary. It is 0.3 miles (0.48 km) east-southeast of the heading of Hoil Creek, 7 miles (11 km) northwest of Cobb Mountain and 8 miles (13 km) south of Kelseyville.

The Köppen climate classification is Csb : Warm-summer Mediterranean climate. The mountain is named for John Christian Christof Mahnke (1858–1939) and his family, who ran several hundred head of angora goats on this peak for 70 years. There is a small building on top of the peak which has an excellent view of the power plants of The Geysers geothermal field.

== Hydrology ==
The peak borders the Russian River watershed to the west. It is 0.3 miles (0.48 km) east-southeast of the heading of Hoil Creek. To the northwest Hoil Creek joins Tyler Creek, a tributary of Pieta Creek, which in turn is a tributary of Russian River. Another stream draining the peak is Hummingbird Creek, which flows south to Squaw Creek, a tributary of Big Sulphur Creek, which is also a tributary of Russian River to the west.

== Dimensions ==
Mahnke Peak is 3,652 feet (1,113 m) high with a prominence of 612 feet (187 m). It has isolation of 5.84 miles (9.40 km) from Mount Hannah to the east-northeast.

== Sources ==
- Bloom, Loren A. (1972), "California", Decisions on Geographic Names in the United States July through September 1970, Department of the Interior, US Board on Geographic Names
- "Mahnke Peak, California", Peakbagger
- "Mahnke Peak", Geographic Names Information System, United States Geological Survey, United States Department of the Interior
- "Mahnke Peak", Google Maps
- "Mahnke Peak, Mendocino County, California, United States", Mindat
- Russian River Integrated Coastal Watershed Management Plan (PDF), Mendocino County Resource Conservation District, June 2012
- "Sierra Club Lake Group hike", Lake County News, 24 November 2018
