= Cow Mountain =

Ridge in California, U.S.

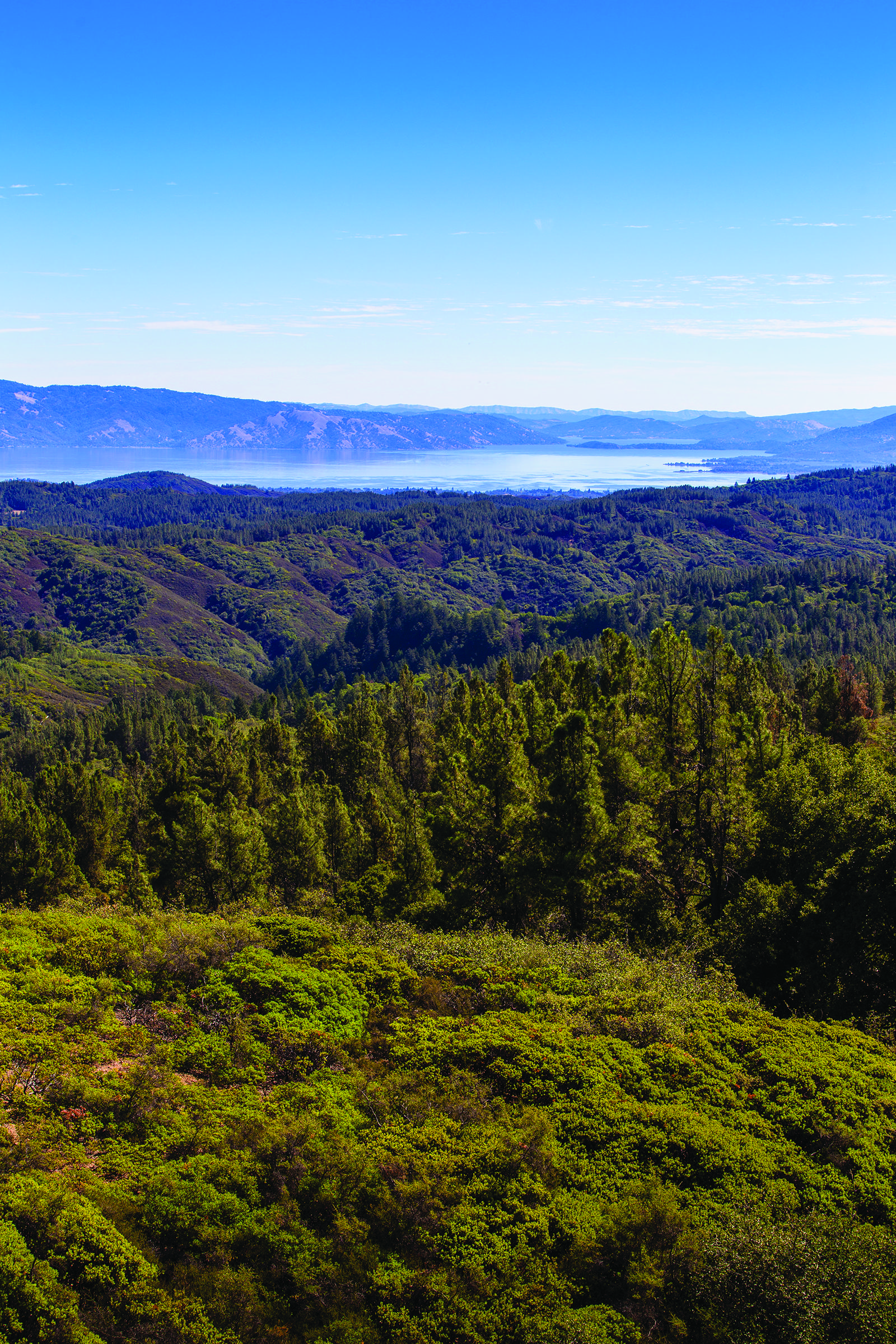
- View over Cow Mountain towards Clear Lake

Highest point
- Elevation: 3,920 ft (1,190 m)
- Prominence: 1,600 ft (490 m)
- Isolation: 9.56 mi (15.39 km) to Elk Mountain
- Coordinates: 39.1671136°N 123.0550007°W

Geography
- Location within California Location within the United States
- Country: United States
- State: California
- County: Lake County
- Parent range: Mayacamas Mountains
- Topo map: Cow Mountain O39123b1 1:24,000

Cow Mountain is a ridge in the Mayacamas Mountains in Lake County, California, and Mendocino County, California. It is home to two large recreation areas. One is closed to off-road vehicles and the other is not. Erosion from the mountain, caused in part by human land use, contributes sediment and nutrients to Clear Lake.

== Location ==
Cow Mountain is in the Mayacamas Mountains, part of the northern California Coast Ranges. It is east of the city of Ukiah and west of the city of Lakeport. It is in Lake and Mendocino counties.

Cow Mountain got its name from longhorn cattle introduced around 1839 by Salvador Vallejo and later ranched by Ben and Andrew Kelsey, which left many rogue cattle roaming the countryside. When settlers arrived in the land around Clear Lake about 1853 they did not want the long horn cattle to breed with their exotic cattle bred for meat production, so began a program of shooting the long horns. Cow Mountain was one of the last refuges for the longhorns, but they had been eliminated by the 1870s by the Hurt family of Scotts Valley.

== Terrain ==
Cow Mountain is a northwest-southeast trending ridge about 7 miles (11 km) long that runs parallel to and about 1.7 miles (2.7 km) west of Cold Creek. Cow Mountain is at least 3,920 feet (1,190 m) high. It has a clean prominence of 1,600 feet (490 m) and an isolation of 9.56 miles (15.39 km). The nearest higher mountain is Elk Mountain to the northeast.

The southeast-plunging Ukiah-Cow Mountain Antiform (UCMA) in the hanging wall block of the Chicken Springs fault zone. This is a folded and sinuous northeast-dipping intra-Franciscan zone of thrusts that is delineated by a narrow belt of serpentinite dipping northeastward under the UCMA.

== Drainage ==
Five thousand years ago, there was a massive landslide on the southern slope of Cow Mountain that filled the channel from Clear Lake to the Russian River. The lake rose, then cut a new channel through Cache Creek into the Sacramento River. Cow Mountain now holds the upper reaches of the Cache Creek watershed to the east and Russian River watershed to the west. There are many year-round streams, springs, and wildlife ponds. Streams in the North Cow Mountain area include Cold Creek, Howard Creek, Sulphur Creek, Mill Creek, and Scotts Creek. Streams in the South Cow Mountain area include Benmore Creek, Panther Creek, Willow Creek, Lyons Valley Creek, and Morrison Creek. There are many small intermittent streams and meadows.

In the winter months heavy rain may cause floods and erosion, but recreational use may be a more important factor in erosion. Closure of roads and banning off-highway vehicles is thought to have significantly reduced erosion in North Cow Mountain. A 1997 analysis of the South Cow Mountain trails identified some that had high potential to contribute sedimentation to Clear Lake. Off-Highway Vehicle (OHV) riding in abandoned walnut orchards and creek beds has increased the rate or erosion.

== Environment ==
=== Climate ===
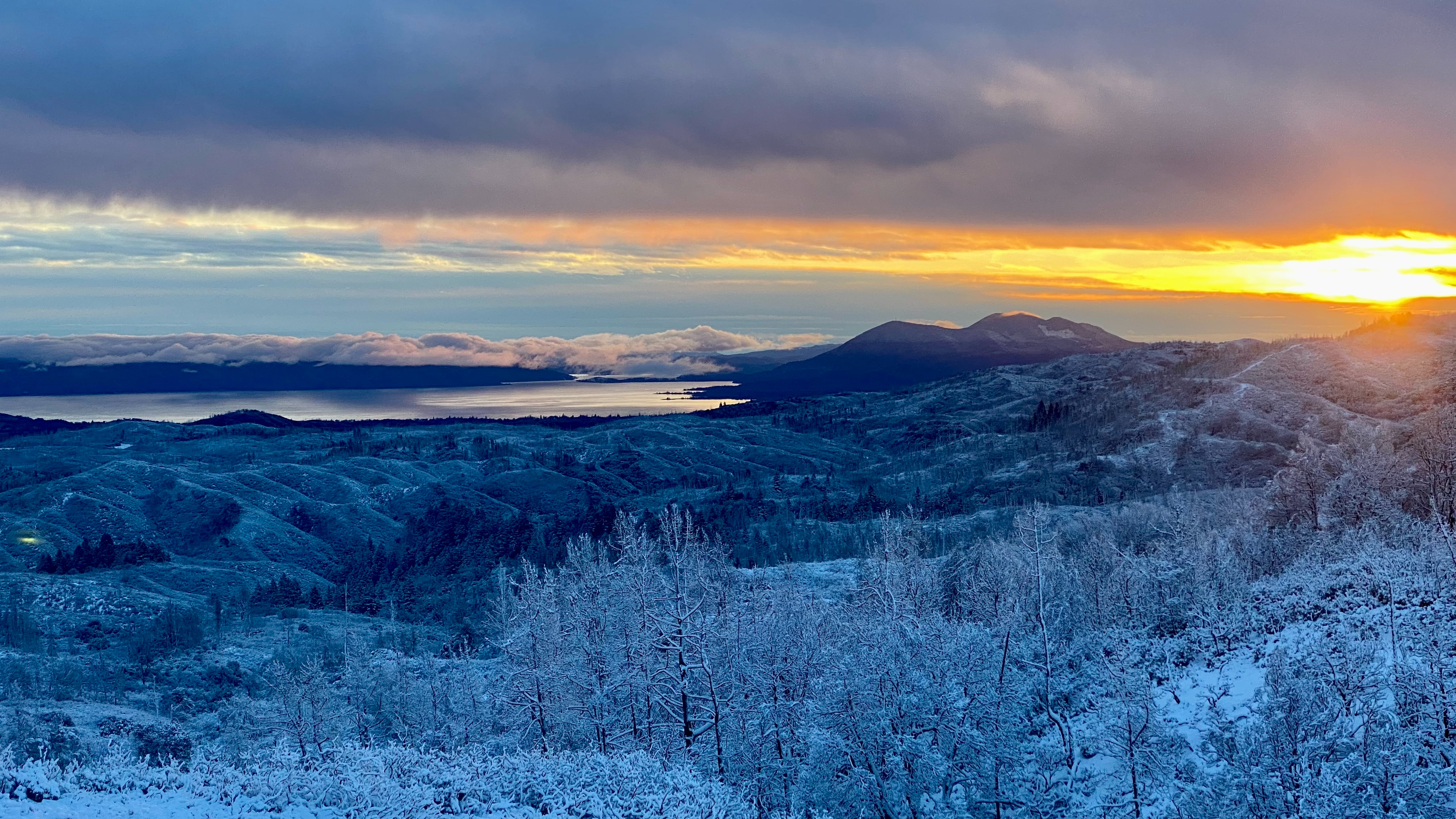
View from Cow Mountain after a winter storm

Cow Mountain is in the Mediterranean eco-region, with wet winters and dry summers. The coldest average temperatures are 25 to 27 °F (−4 to −3 °C). Mean annual precipitation is 40 inches (1,000 mm).

=== Vegetation ===
Vegetation is typical of the interior coastal mountain range. The dominant vegetation on the south and west facing slopes is chamise (Adenostoma fasciculatum). The more mesic northern exposures and ravines hold mixed chaparral and trees such as blue oak (Quercus douglasii), black oak (Quercus kelloggii), Douglas fir (Pseudotsuga menziesii), California nutmeg (Torreya californica) and California bay laurel (Umbellularia californica). A large black oak forest covers the top and north sides of Cow Mountain. There are stands of knobcone pine (Pinus attenuata) and foothill gray pine (Pinus sabiniana) throughout the area. Non-native invasive species include yellow starthistle (Centaurea solstitialis), medusahead (Taeniatherum caput-medusae), Italian thistle (Carduus pycnocephalus), bull thistle (Cirsium vulgare), arundo (Arundo donax), jubata grass (Cortaderia jubata), scotch broom (Cytisus scoparius) and Harding grass (Phalaris aquatica).

Prescribed burning of the chaparral on south facing slopes has been used to improve the habitat for deer and other wildlife by giving them access to younger and more protein-rich vegetation. One estimate of the natural fire cycle in 20–40 years, while another is 35–100+ years. In 1981 the Cow Mountain Fire burned about 26,000 acres (11,000 ha). The headwaters of Scotts Creek on South Cow Mountain were severely burned in 2018 by the Mendocino Complex Fire, which may have increased erosion and the flow of sediments and dissolved nutrients into the Clear Lake.

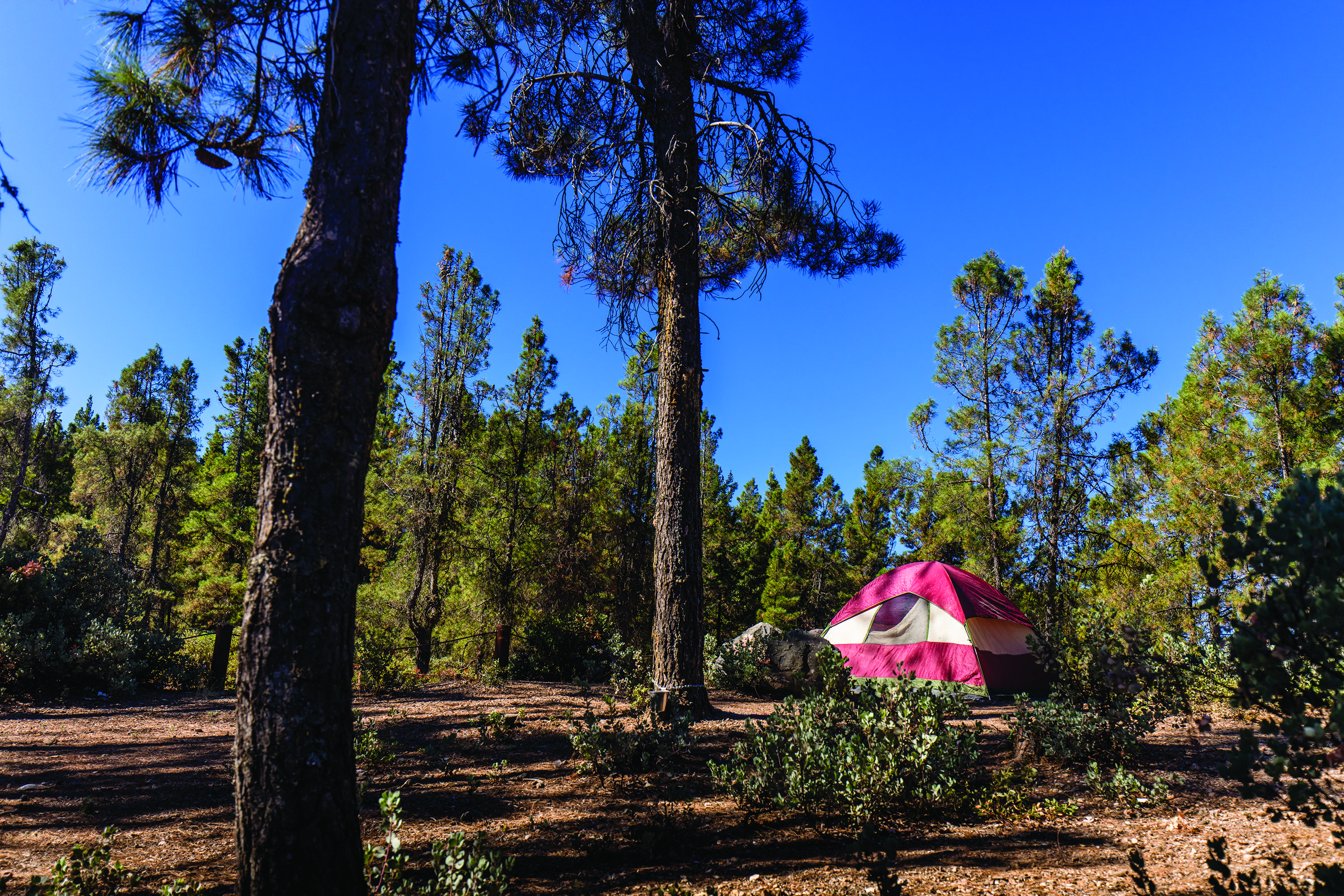
Tent on Cow Mountain

The 40-acre (16 ha) Lost Valley Meadow in South Cow Mountain is an Area of Critical Environmental Concern (ACEC) with a unique assemblage of native vegetation in the Miner's Ridge watershed of the Russian River Drainage system.

=== Fauna ===
Year round resident mammals include Columbian black-tail deer (Odocoileus hemionus), feral pig, western gray squirrel, brush rabbit, coyote, bobcat, cougar and raccoon. The two key game species are black-tail deer and tule elk. Special status species include Foothill yellow-legged frog (Rana boylii), Fisher (Martes pennati pacifica) and Western pond turtle (Emys marmorata).

Bird species include wild turkey (Meleagris gallopavo), California quail (Callipepla californica), mourning dove (Zenaida macroura), California thrasher (Toxostoma redivivum), several species of woodpecker, raven, scrub jay (Aphelocoma), turkey vulture (Cathartes aura), red-tailed hawk (Buteo jamaicensis), kestrel, and various species of songbirds. Migratory Birds of Conservation Concern are peregrine falcon (Falco peregrinus), prairie falcon (Falco mexicanus), burrowing owl (Athene cunicularia), long-billed curlew (Numenius americanus), rufous hummingbird (Selasphorus rufus), Lewis's woodpecker (Melanerpes lewis), olive-sided flycatcher (Contopus borealis) and Lawrence's goldfinch (Carduelis lawrencei). Focal species include greater roadrunner (Geococcyx californianus), rufous-crowned sparrow (Aimophila ruficeps), sage sparrow (Amphispiza belli), and wrentit (Chamaea fasciata).

== Human presence ==
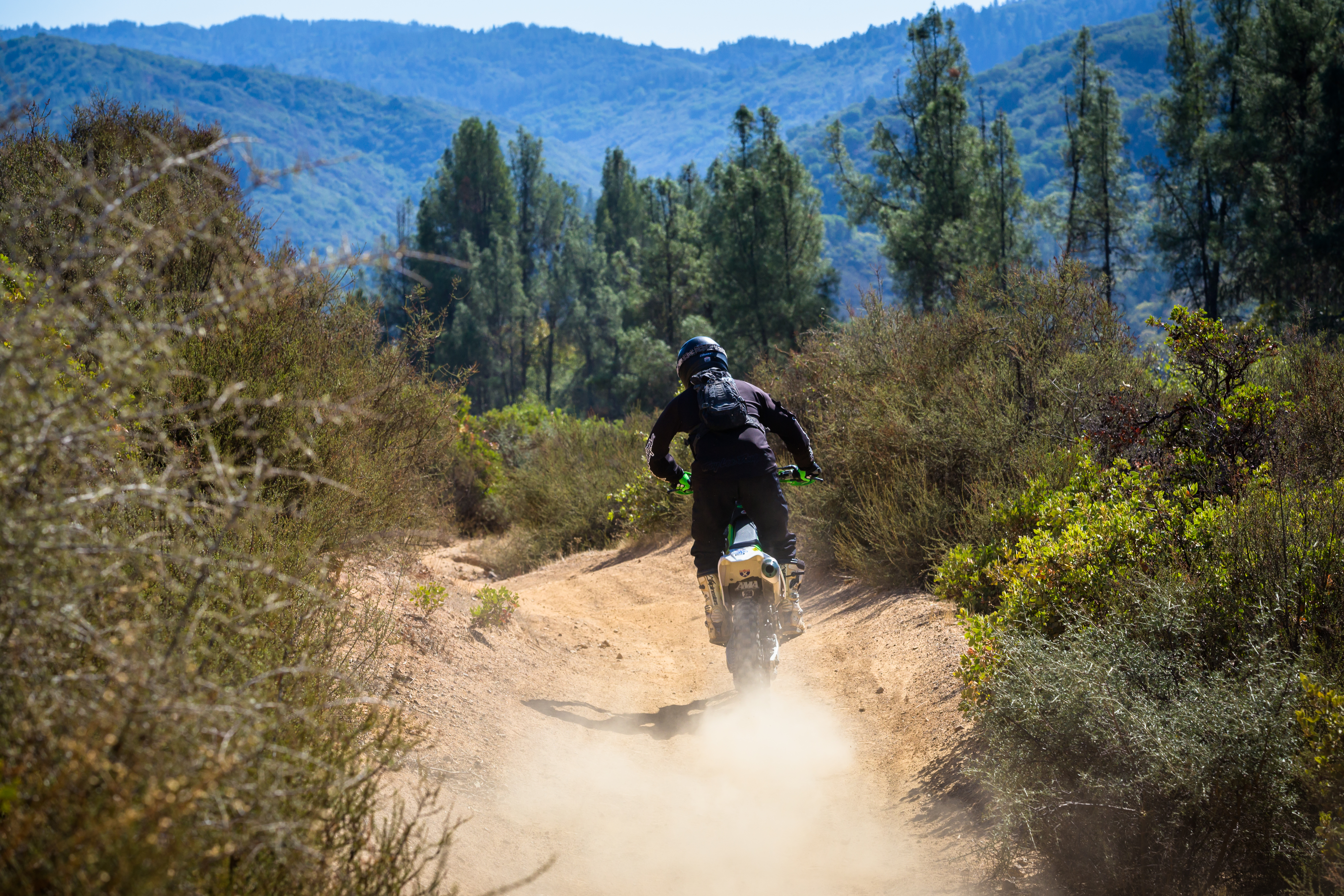
Biker in South Cow Mountain OHV Recreation Area

The Cow Mountain Area was probably within the territory controlled by the Northern Pomo ethnic group. The mountain probably had few residents in both the prehistoric and historic period. The Norris Trail (Nóboral-Cókadjal) ran up and over Cow Mountain from Lakeport to Ukiah, and before 1867 was one of the main routes in the area. Most of the known cultural resources in the area are related to historic mining, residential and hunting activities.

The Cow Mountain Management Area covers about 51,000 acres (21,000 ha) of public land. It is divided into North and South Cow Mountain. The use of weapons is limited to designated shooting areas except when hunting. The recreational area is half in Lake County and half in Mendocino County.

The North Cow Mountain Recreation Area covers about 26,000 acres (11,000 ha) of public land that is managed for non-motorized use. Vehicles must stay on designated routes and trails: off-highway vehicle use is not permitted. There are nearly 30 miles (48 km) of hiking, biking, and equestrian trails. Camping is allowed throughout the area, but no nearer than 300 yards (270 m) to any water source. There are two campgrounds, Mayacamas with six sites and Goat Rock with two sites. Goat Rock is only accessible by hiking or horseback. Hunting is also allowed.

South Cow Mountain OHV Recreation Area covers about 23,000 acres (9,300 ha) of public land managed for off-highway vehicle use. Vehicle use is limited to 94 miles (151 km) of designated roads and trails. The area is closed during periods of precipitation, which usually occur in November. It typically opens after 72 hours with no precipitation. South Cow Mountain is closed to the general public for an annual motorcycle rally. Apart from erosion on the trails in South Cow Mountain, problems include vandalism, rowdiness at night, irresponsible shooters who damage signs and trees and litter the ground with shotgun shells, illegal dumping and tire burning.

== Sources ==
- Alpers, Charles, Scotts Creek Nutrient Erosion Study, Lake County, California, USGS California Water Science Center
- Bureau of Land Management (2013-02-13), "Notice of Final Supplementary Rules for Public Lands Managed by the Ukiah Field Office ...", Federal Register, 78 (30), Office of the Federal Register, National Archives and Records Service, General Services Administration
- "Cow Mountain", Geographic Names Information System, United States Geological Survey, United States Department of the Interior
- Lundquist, Erica (February 2010), Scotts Creek Watershed Assessment (PDF), Scotts Creek Watershed Council
- McLaughlin, R. J.; Stanley, R. G.; Melosh, B. L.; Langenheim, V. E. (December 2019), "Neotectonic significance of Franciscan Complex bedrock structure adjacent to the Maacama Fault Zone in the Ukiah-Hopland area, northern California", American Geophysical Union, Fall Meeting 2019 (abstract), Bibcode:2019AGUFM.T23F0444M
- North Cow Mountain Recreation Area, US Department of the Interior Bureau of Land Management
- South Cow Mountain Recreation Area, US Department of the Interior Bureau of Land Management
- Ukiah Field Office (2006), Resource Management Plan: Environmental Impact Statement
- Ukiah Field Office (2016), Cow Mountain Recreation Area Implementation Plan (PDF), Bureau of Land Management
- US Board on Geographic Names (1960), Decisions on Names in the United States, Department of the Interior
- Vitz, John, "Cow Mountain, California", Peakbagger
- Witter, Gene Paleno (21 January 2017), "Lake County history: The coming of man", Ukiah Daily Journal
