= Windsor High School (California) =

High school in Windsor, California, United States

Coordinates: 38°32′33″N 122°49′06″W

Location
- 8695 Windsor Rd; Windsor, California

Information
- Type: Public
- Established: 1995
- Principal: Danielle Buckman
- Teaching staff: 83.81 (FTE)
- Enrollment: 1,638 (2023–2024)
- Student to teacher ratio: 19.54
- Campus: Town
- Colors: Black and Gold
- Athletics conference: NBL
- Mascot: Jaguars
- Nickname: The Jaguars/JAGS
- Website: https://whs.wusd.org/

Windsor High School or WHS is a public secondary school in Windsor, California. It is part of Windsor Unified School District. In 2014, its graduate rate was 94.6%.

== Awards ==
Windsor High School was named a California Distinguished School for 2005 on account of its achievement on the STAR tests.

== History ==
For decades, high school students from Windsor were sent to Healdsburg to attend high school.

On May 8, 1991, the Windsor Union School District (grades K–8) received a petition from Windsor residents requesting unification of the District to serve its students from kindergarten through 12th grade. In April 1992, Windsor voters overwhelmingly passed the ballot measure to unify the District at which time Windsor began the formal process of separating the high school students from what was then known as the Healdsburg Union High School District .

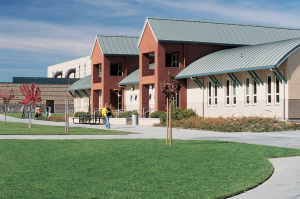

In August 1995, Windsor High School opened with 160 - 9th grade students in 7 portable classrooms and a construction trailer serving as the administration building. Windsor High School students shared their original campus with 5th -8th grade students from Windsor Middle School on the current Windsor Creek Elementary School site. During the 1996–97 school year, the elementary school facilities could no longer house the growing number of high school students so students were temporarily bussed between three locations including Luther Burbank Center and Windsor Business Park while construction efforts were underway to complete more appropriate housing for high school students.

In 1997, a new middle school was opened on Brooks Road and housed 350 students (Class of 1999 and 2000) while the District battled opponents to the selected site for the permanent high school campus who claimed that the campus was too close to the Sonoma County Airport. After several years of delay, the permanent campus for Windsor High School was ready for occupancy in the fall of 2000.

Amidst local television cameras, the first Windsor High School graduating class, 99 graduates of the Class of 1999, walked across the stage at Luther Burbank Center to receive their diplomas. Under the leadership of the District's Superintendent, Ian Kirkpatrick, and its first principal, Jeff Harding, the Windsor High School students were true pioneers in the tradition of the early Gold Rush community that originally formed the Windsor Township of the 1850s.

== Core Structure ==
All students are enrolled in an academic core along with other non-core classes. The core structure incorporates teams of two or three teachers who work together to deliver instruction through interdisciplinary project-based strategies. Each core of three teachers meets with students on alternating days for 4½ hours of continuous instruction to deliver content in three subject areas.

=== 9/10 Cores ===
Teachers from English, science, and social studies work together as a team with a common group of 9th and 10th grade students. ELD and Special Day cores are available for special needs students. An Honors Core option is available for students interested in greater academic rigor. Cores which receive California Partnership Academy funding begin in the 10th grade and continue in 11th & 12th grade.

=== 11/12 Cores ===
At the 11th and 12th grade level, each core focuses on a particular area of study or major. Teachers with expertise in their specific Focus Area work together to deliver content in English, government, economics, and U.S. history, as well as in the specific focus of their core.

Focus Areas Include:
Axis STEM Academy
Areté Media Academy
Advanced Placement Core
Pre-Med Core
NUEVA School for the Performing Arts
Vineyard Academy
BUILD Academy
11/12 Hybrid Core

== Athletics ==
In 2011, Windsor's Varsity Football team made it to the NCS Division II Championship Game. On December 9, 2011, the Windsor high school football team beat Concord high school football by a score of 28–20. The Windsor Jaguars scored 21 unanswered points in the second half and claimed the NCS Division II Title.

Windsor acquired both a girls and boys lacrosse team in 2015. The beginning of the 2017 school year was their fourth season with the school. Windsor's girls lacrosse team has made a memorable comeback this past season by winning a majority of their games and landing second place in their league after two consecutive seasons of losses.

== See also ==
- Windsor Unified School District
