= Mark West Creek =

Stream in the state of California

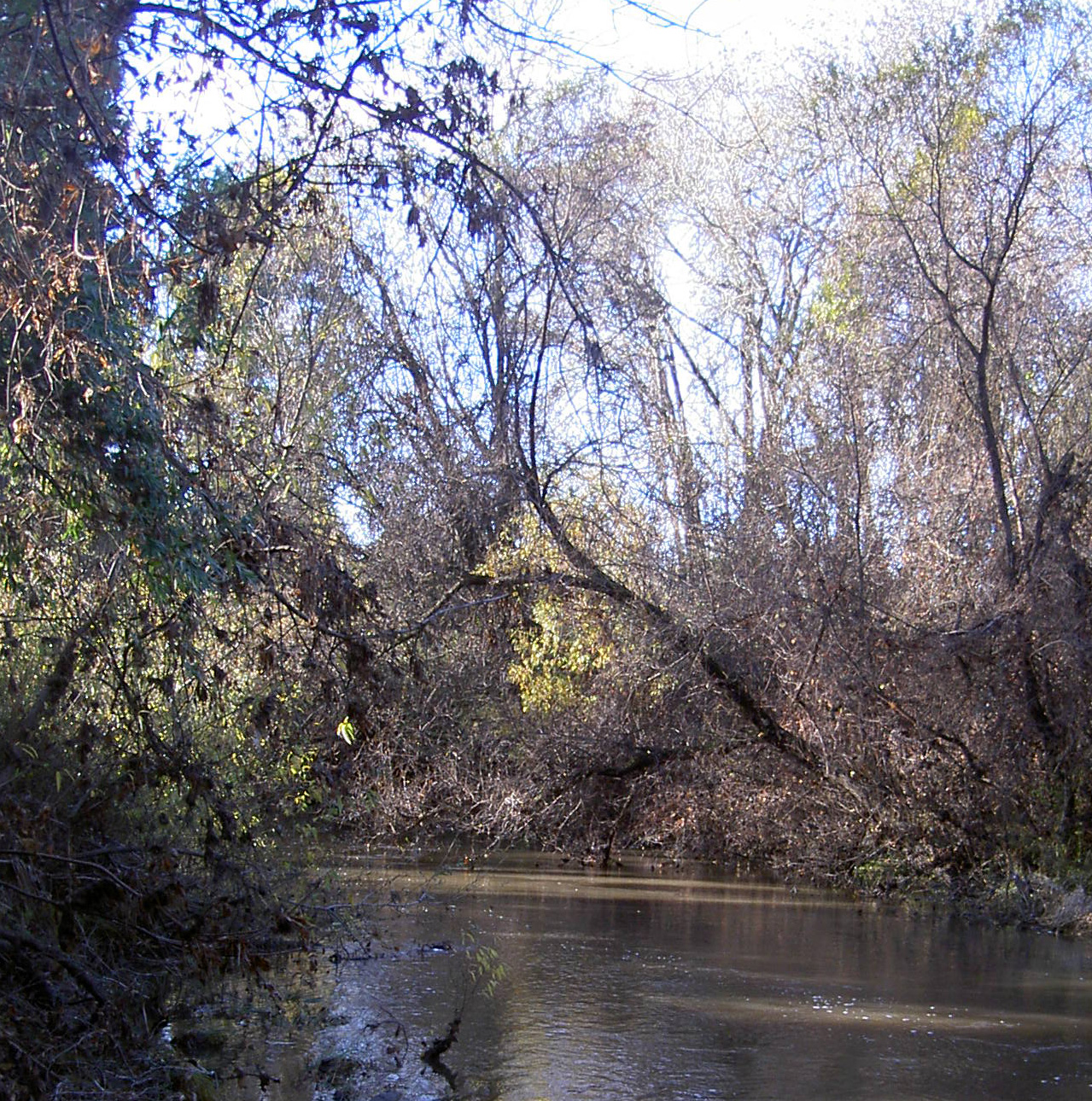
- Mark West Creek between Windsor Creek and the Russian River

- Location of the mouth of Mark West Creek in California
- Etymology: William Marcus West

Location
- Country: United States
- State: California
- Region: Sonoma County
- Cities: Mark West, California, Mark West Springs, California

Physical characteristics
- Source: Mayacamas Mountains
  - location: 6 mi (10 km) west of St. Helena, California
  - coordinates: 38°31′3″N 122°33′47″W
  - elevation: 1,922 ft (586 m)
- Mouth: Russian River
  - location: north of Forestville, California
  - coordinates: 38°29′38″N 122°53′35″W
  - elevation: 45 ft (14 m)

Basin features
- Tributaries
  - left: Windsor Creek, Mill Creek, Weeks Creek, Van Buren Creek
  - right: Laguna de Santa Rosa, Porter Creek, Humbug Creek

Mark West Creek is a 29.9-mile-long (48.1 km) stream that rises in the Mayacamas Mountains of Sonoma County, California, United States. Tributaries of Mark West Creek include Porter Creek and Hummingbird Creek, both of which originate in the same mountain range. Discharge waters of Mark West Creek reach the Russian River after a confluence with the Laguna de Santa Rosa. The Community Clean Water Institute has developed a program for monitoring pollutants in Mark West Creek.

The four-mile stretch of Mark West Creek from Mark West Lodge to Mark West Creek Road is a challenging class III-V whitewater kayaking run.

== Course ==
Mark West Creek originates about 6 miles (10 km) west of St. Helena, California near St. Helena Road. The road goes along the Creek westward to Calistoga Road, where the Creek turns northeast, flowing through the town of Mark West Springs. From there, it descends southward. Mark West Springs Road was built next to it. The Creek passes Mayacama Golf Club and turns westward, emerging from hills east of the Sonoma County Airport. The Northwestern Pacific Railroad and later U.S. Route 101 were built over it south of Airport Boulevard and the Creek continues generally westward, passing south of the airport to join the Laguna de Santa Rosa east of Forestville. From there, the Creek flows north to a confluence with Windsor Creek, and then flows westward, entering the Russian River east of Steelhead Beach Regional Park.

Near the Laguna de Santa Rosa confluence, Mark West Creek has been diverted southward in three separate places, making it appear that the Creek feeds the Laguna instead of vice versa. Since 1988, the Creek length between the Laguna de Santa Rosa and the Russian River has often been considered part of the Laguna. The Laguna de Santa Rosa Foundation has promoted this nomenclature.

== Watershed ==
The Mark West Creek drainage basin covers a large portion of Sonoma County, from Mount Saint Helena and Sonoma Mountain in the east to Forestville in the west. It includes four cities (Santa Rosa, Rohnert Park, Sebastopol, and Cotati) and the incorporated town of Windsor. Adjacent watersheds include those of Green Valley Creek, Petaluma River, Sonoma Creek, the Napa River, and the Russian River.

== See also ==
- List of watercourses in the San Francisco Bay Area
