= Mark West Springs, California =

Unincorporated community in California, United States

- Location within the state of California
- Coordinates: 38°32′57″N 122°43′13″W
- Country: United States
- State: California
- County: Sonoma
- Elevation: 449 ft (137 m)
- Time zone: UTC-8 (PST)
  - Summer (DST): UTC-7 (PDT)
- ZIP code: 95492
- Area code: 707
- FIPS code: 06-46010
- GNIS feature ID: 228121

Mark West Springs is set of springs in eastern Santa Rosa, California that were used as a resort since 1880 and perhaps earlier. It is located on Porter Creek Road in the Mayacamas Mountains. It flows through the community.

It is named after Scottish American pioneer William Marcus West.

== See also ==
- Mark West, California
