= William Marcus West =

William Marcus "Mark" West was a Scottish American pioneer who settled in what is now eastern Sonoma County, California, United States.

== Life ==
West came to the area in 1832, soon after marrying Guadalupe Vasquez, a sister of General Vallejo. At the time, the area belonged to Mexico. In 1840, he acquired the 6,663-acre (26.96 km^{2}) Rancho San Miguel, located north of Santa Rosa Creek. Mark West established a hacienda, post office, and trading post near Mark West Creek.

Maria Francisca Guadalupe Vasquez y Lugo, who was the daughter of Felipe Vasquez y and Nicanor Lugo, married Mark West at the Mission San Carlos Boromeo in 1834. She was the granddaughter of Juan Athanasio Vasquez, who was a soldier in the Anza 1776 Expedition. Her father, Jose Felipe Vasquez y Bojorquez, was grantee of Rancho Chamiscal in 1835

== Legacy ==
Several geographic features in the area were named after him, including Mark West Creek, Mark West School, and the communities of Mark West and Mark West Springs, California.

== See also ==
- Santa Rosa, California
