= Fulton, California =

Fulton
- census-designated place
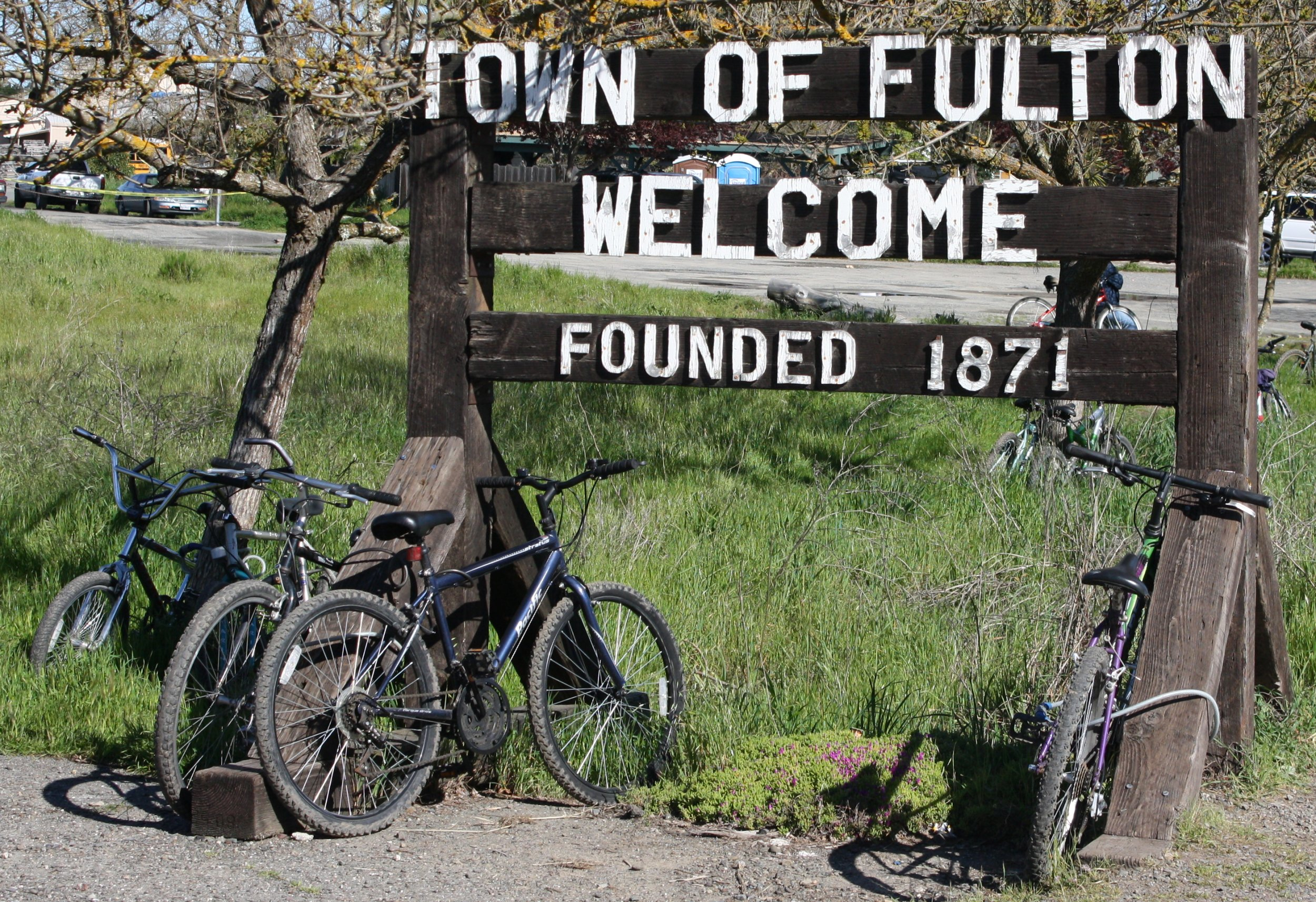
- Fulton, California

- Location of Fulton in Sonoma County, California

- Location within California Location within the United States
- Coordinates: 38°29′47″N 122°46′12″W
- Country: United States
- State: California
- County: Sonoma

Area
  - Total: 1.949 sq mi (5.047 km^{2})
  - Land: 1.949 sq mi (5.047 km^{2})
  - Water: 0 sq mi (0 km^{2}) 0%
- Elevation: 135 ft (41 m)

Population (2020)
  - Total: 551
  - Density: 283/sq mi (109/km^{2})
- Time zone: UTC-8 (Pacific (PST))
  - Summer (DST): UTC-7 (PDT)
- ZIP code: 95439
- Area code: 707
- GNIS feature ID: 1658593

Fulton is a census-designated place (CDP) in Sonoma County, California, United States. Fulton is just to the north of the city limits of Santa Rosa, and 7 miles (11 km) north-northeast of Sebastopol. Fulton has a post office, established in 1871 and assigned ZIP code 95439. The community is named after Thomas and James Fulton, who founded the community. As of the 2020 census, Fulton had a population of 551. There are a set of railway lines which go through the town boundaries; these lines are used by Sonoma–Marin Area Rail Transit (or the SMART Train). Fulton was once home to a chicken processing plant that was in operation from the 1960s until its closure in 2010.

== History ==
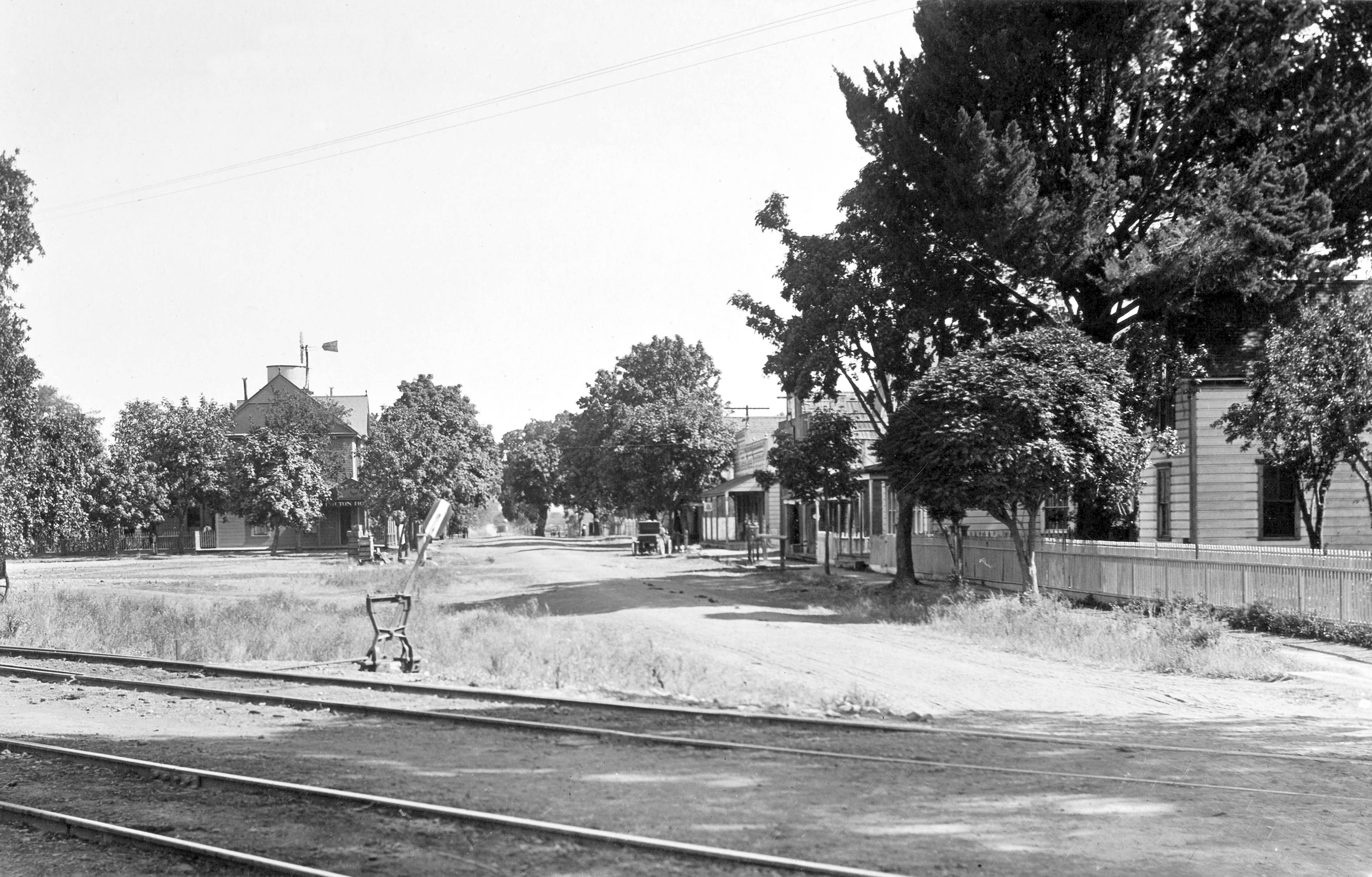
Fulton, 1906

The community is named after Thomas and James Fulton, who founded the community.

== Geography ==
According to the United States Census Bureau, the CDP covers an area of 1.9 square miles (4.9 km^{2}), all land.

=== Climate ===
This region experiences warm (but not hot) and dry summers, with no average monthly temperatures above 71.6 °F (22 °C). According to the Köppen Climate Classification system, Fulton has a warm-summer Mediterranean climate, abbreviated "Csb" on climate maps.

== Demographics ==
Historical population
Census	Pop.	Note	%±
2010	541		—
2020	551		1.8%
U.S. Decennial Census; 1860–1870 1880-1890; 1900 1910 1920; 1930 1940 1950; 1960 1970 1980; 1990 2000 2010; 2020

Fulton first appeared as a census designated place in the 2010 U.S. census.

=== Racial and ethnic composition ===
Fulton CDP, California – Racial and ethnic composition Note: the US Census treats Hispanic/Latino as an ethnic category. This table excludes Latinos from the racial categories and assigns them to a separate category. Hispanics/Latinos may be of any race.
Race / Ethnicity (NH = Non-Hispanic)	Pop 2010	Pop 2020	% 2010	% 2020
White alone (NH)	320	276	59.15%	50.09%
Black or African American alone (NH)	3	2	0.55%	0.36%
Native American or Alaska Native alone (NH)	4	2	0.74%	0.36%
Asian alone (NH)	11	7	2.03%	1.27%
Native Hawaiian or Pacific Islander alone (NH)	1	0	0.18%	0.00%
Other race alone (NH)	4	5	0.74%	0.91%
Mixed race or Multiracial (NH)	12	18	2.22%	3.27%
Hispanic or Latino (any race)	186	241	34.38%	43.74%
Total	541	551	100.00%	100.00%

=== 2020 census ===
The 2020 United States census reported that Fulton had a population of 551. The population density was 282.7 inhabitants per square mile (109.2/km^{2}). The racial makeup of Fulton was 297 (53.9%) White, 4 (0.7%) African American, 5 (0.9%) Native American, 7 (1.3%) Asian, 0 (0.0%) Pacific Islander, 139 (25.2%) from other races, and 99 (18.0%) from two or more races. Hispanic or Latino of any race were 241 persons (43.7%).

The census reported that 99.6% of the population lived in households, 0.4% lived in non-institutionalized group quarters, and no one was institutionalized.

There were 200 households, out of which 50 (25.0%) had children under the age of 18 living in them, 90 (45.0%) were married-couple households, 13 (6.5%) were cohabiting couple households, 46 (23.0%) had a female householder with no partner present, and 51 (25.5%) had a male householder with no partner present. 67 households (33.5%) were one person, and 35 (17.5%) were one person aged 65 or older. The average household size was 2.75. There were 119 families (59.5% of all households).

The age distribution was 102 people (18.5%) under the age of 18, 51 people (9.3%) aged 18 to 24, 122 people (22.1%) aged 25 to 44, 176 people (31.9%) aged 45 to 64, and 100 people (18.1%) who were 65 years of age or older. The median age was 45.1 years. For every 100 females, there were 112.7 males.

There were 209 housing units at an average density of 107.2 units per square mile (41.4 units/km^{2}), of which 200 (95.7%) were occupied. Of these, 146 (73.0%) were owner-occupied, and 54 (27.0%) were occupied by renters.

== Education ==
The school districts are Mark West Union Elementary School District and Santa Rosa High School District.
