= Mark West, California =

Unincorporated community in California, United States

- Location within the state of California
- Coordinates: 38°30′33.98″N 122°46′55.99″W
- Country: United States
- State: California
- County: Sonoma
- Elevation: 420 ft (128 m)
- Time zone: UTC-8 (PST)
  - Summer (DST): UTC-7 (PDT)
- ZIP code: 95403, 95492
- Area code: 707
- GNIS feature ID: 228117

Mark West is an unincorporated community immediately north of Santa Rosa in Sonoma County, California, United States. Mark West is located along Mark West Springs Road adjacent to U.S. Highway 101. The community of Mark West is named for Scottish American pioneer William Marcus West.

After the San Francisco and North Pacific Railroad was extended to Cloverdale in the 1870s, its trains stopped in Mark West.

== See also ==
- Larkfield-Wikiup, California
- Mark West Creek
- Mark West Springs
- Northwestern Pacific Railroad
