= Windsor, California =

Town in California, United States

- City in California
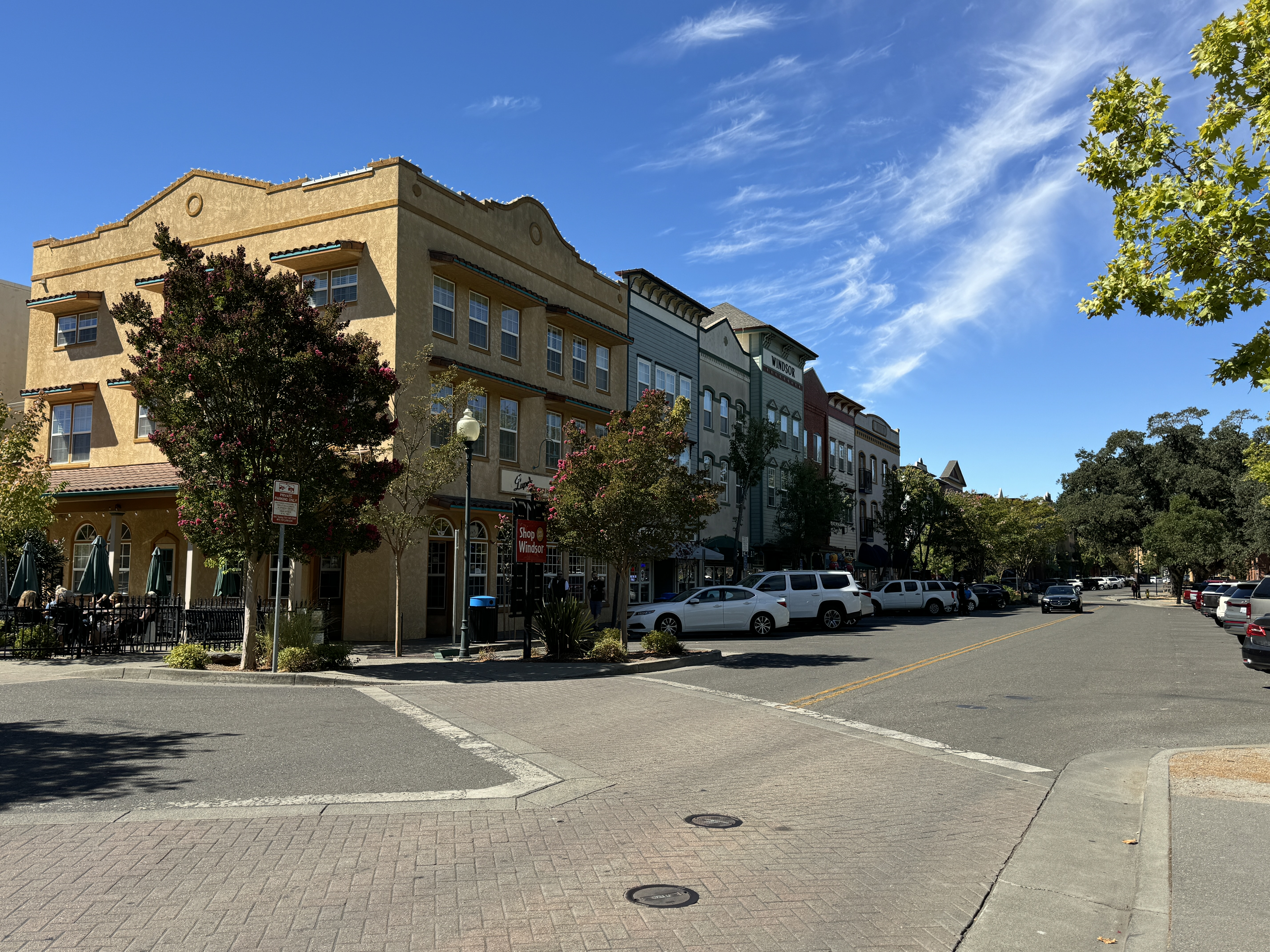
- Downtown Windsor in September 2024.
- Interactive map of Windsor, California
- Location within the state of California Windsor, California (the United States)
- Coordinates: 38°32′50″N 122°48′59″W
- Country: United States
- State: California
- County: Sonoma
- Named for: Windsor, England

Government
  - Type: Council–manager
  - Mayor: Rosa Reynoza

Area
  - Total: 7.46 sq mi (19.32 km^{2})
  - Land: 7.44 sq mi (19.26 km^{2})
  - Water: 0.023 sq mi (0.06 km^{2})
- Elevation: 118 ft (36 m)

Population (2020)
  - Total: 26,344
  - Density: 3,543/sq mi (1,367.9/km^{2})
- Time zone: UTC-8 (Pacific)
  - Summer (DST): UTC-7 (PDT)
- ZIP code: 95492
- Area code(s): 707, 369
- FIPS code: 06-85922
- GNIS feature ID: 1667892
- Website: Official website

Windsor is an incorporated town in Sonoma County, California, United States. The town is nine miles (14 km) north of Santa Rosa and 63 miles north of San Francisco. The population was 26,344 as of the 2020 census.

== History ==
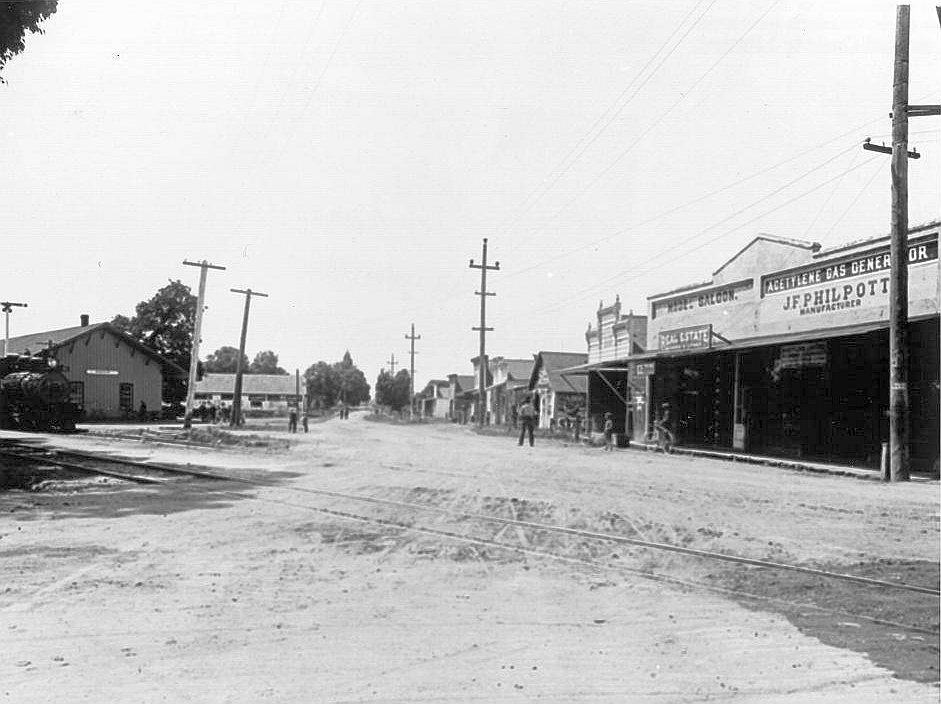
Northwestern Pacific Railroad depot and surrounding street in Windsor, 1900

=== Founding ===
The site now occupied by the town of Windsor was originally inhabited by the Southern Pomo. It was known as Tsoliikawai (ćol:ik:o=wi), meaning "blackbird field", a name also applied to the village, tribe or tribelet at the site. This group was probably part of the Kaitactemi tribe that ruled from the Healdsburg area down to Mark West Creek.

Windsor's first European settlers arrived in 1851. In 1855, a post office was established in Windsor and Hiram Lewis, a Pony Express rider, became the town's first postmaster. He named the town Windsor because it reminded him of the grounds around Windsor Castle, a medieval castle from his home country of England. The following year, a business enterprise was built in eastern Windsor, which included a goods store, a shoe shop, a grocery and meat market, a saloon, a hotel, a boarding house, and two confectionery shops. The Northwestern Pacific Railroad was completed through the town in 1872, providing a faster and cheaper link to the Bay Area.

On May 21, 1905, a fire destroyed the center of Windsor. Fanned by heavy winds, the fire destroyed several businesses, including a hotel and a barber shop. An estimated $30,000 worth of property was damaged.

The Great San Francisco Earthquake caused major damage to numerous buildings in Windsor, many of which were still in the process of repair and reconstruction from 1905 fire.

In 1915, the Old Redwood Highway through Windsor was paved. Up until then, all roads in the area had been dirt.

During World War II, a United States Army Air Forces training air base (currently the Charles M. Schulz – Sonoma County Airport) was built in southern Windsor, and it was common to hear fighter aircraft and bombers flying over the town.

In 1943, a camp for German prisoners of war was built west of downtown Windsor, on the site of a former migrant labor camp. The camp was a branch camp of the much larger Camp Beale POW camp. Those assigned to the camp worked (for $0.80 per day) at farms in the county, picking apples, prunes, hops, and other crops, packing apples, and doing similar work.

=== Incorporation and modern history ===
The Windsor area grew five-fold in the 1980s as urban sprawl developed north of Santa Rosa along portions of U.S. Highway 101. The local economy shifted from agricultural work, mainly involving wine grapes, to services that catered to commuters and the new residential area. On July 1, 1992, Windsor was incorporated as a town. Prior to that, it had been part of unincorporated Sonoma County.

A large mixed-use development in "Poor Man's Flat" around the former train station in downtown Windsor began construction in the 1990s. A walkable village that incorporated New Urbanist design principles was created at the behest of the city government, which also restricted development outside of the downtown area. A large city park, named the Town Green, opened in 2001. By 2006, over 130 condominiums and 50 businesses had moved into the downtown development, which cost an estimated $120 million.

In January 1998, Windsor voters approved a twenty-year urban growth boundary (UGA), with 72% in favor. In 2017, the UGA was renewed, by vote, for another 22 years.

== Geography ==
According to the United States Census Bureau, the Town has a total area of 7.3 square miles (19 km^{2}), of which only 0.34% is water. Windsor is 2 miles (3.2 km) from the Russian River.

Windsor is located on U.S. Highway 101 in the Russian River valley. Neighboring places include Healdsburg, Santa Rosa, and Forestville.

== Demographics ==
Historical population
Census	Pop.	Note	%±
2000	22,744		—
2010	26,801		17.8%
2020	26,344		−1.7%
2025 (est.)	25,864	▼	−1.8%
U.S. Decennial Census; 1860–1870 1880-1890; 1900 1910 1920; 1930 1940 1950; 1960 1970 1980; 1990 2000 2010; 2020

Windsor first appeared as a census designated place in the 1990 U.S. census; and then as a town after incorporation in 1993.

=== Racial and ethnic composition ===
Race and Ethnicity
Racial and ethnic composition	2000	2010	2020
White (non-Hispanic)	70.3%	60.65%	56.48%
Hispanic or Latino (of any race)	23.58%	31.76%	33.78%
Two or more races (non-Hispanic)	2.24%	2.54%	4.85%
Asian (non-Hispanic)	2.21%	2.89%	2.82%
Black or African American (non-Hispanic)	0.66%	0.71%	0.83%
Native American (non-Hispanic)	0.77%	1.06%	0.7%
Other (non-Hispanic)	0.11%	0.21%	0.34%
Pacific Islander (non-Hispanic)	0.13%	0.18%	0.2%

=== 2020 census ===
As of the 2020 census, Windsor had a population of 26,344 and a population density of 3,542.8 inhabitants per square mile (1,367.9/km^{2}). For every 100 females, there were 95.6 males, and for every 100 females age 18 and over, there were 92.4 males age 18 and over.

The age distribution was 22.3% under the age of 18, 8.3% aged 18 to 24, 22.9% aged 25 to 44, 28.8% aged 45 to 64, and 17.8% who were 65 years of age or older. The median age was 42.2 years.

The census reported that 99.4% of the population lived in households, 0.6% lived in non-institutionalized group quarters, and no one was institutionalized. 99.7% of residents lived in urban areas, while 0.3% lived in rural areas.

There were 9,167 households in Windsor, of which 35.8% had children under the age of 18 living in them. Of all households, 58.3% were married-couple households, 6.1% were cohabiting couple households, 12.2% were households with a male householder and no spouse or partner present, and 23.4% were households with a female householder and no spouse or partner present. About 19.4% of all households were made up of individuals, and 11.5% had someone living alone who was 65 years of age or older. The average household size was 2.86. There were 6,876 families (75.0% of all households).

There were 9,672 housing units at an average density of 1,300.7 units per square mile (502.2 units/km^{2}), of which 9,167 (94.8%) were occupied and 5.2% were vacant. Of occupied housing units, 76.3% were owner-occupied and 23.7% were occupied by renters. The homeowner vacancy rate was 0.8% and the rental vacancy rate was 4.2%.

=== Income and poverty ===
In 2023, the US Census Bureau estimated that the median household income was $129,004, and the per capita income was $54,425. About 1.7% of families and 4.7% of the population were below the poverty line.

== Economy ==
=== Business and retail centers ===
Shopping centers include Bell Village, Lakewood Shopping Center, Lakewood Village, Old Downtown Windsor, Shiloh Shopping Center, Starr Station, The Plaza on Lakewood, Windsor Creek Plaza, Windsor Palms Plaza, and Windsor Village.

=== Tourism ===
In 2004, Windsor joined the Sonoma County Business Improvement Area to take advantage of the marketing opportunities provided by Sonoma County Tourism.

== Arts and culture ==
=== Events ===
Since 2001, the Town of Windsor and local sponsors have organized a weekly free concert series on the Town Green. Windsor is home to several other community events in coordination with local organizations.

Events include the annual Earth Day and Wellness Festival, Windsor Days Parade, Cinco de Mayo Festival, and the Community Art and Flower Show. Other events included the Windsor Half Marathon and Expo, the annual Sonoma County Hot Air Balloon Classic (held in Windsor until moving to Santa Rosa in 2020), and Ironman Vineman triathlon, the oldest iron-distance event in the continental United States (dating back to 1990).

Every December, Windsor celebrates the opening of the holiday season with the Charlie Brown Christmas Tree Grove on Windsor's Town Green. The event includes 200 Christmas trees that are decorated by businesses, organizations, and residents.

=== Museum ===
The Windsor Historical Society opened a museum in February 2009 that features exhibits on the area's history. It is located in the historic Hembree House adjacent to the senior center.

=== Parks and recreation ===
Several community and neighborhood parks are located within the Town of Windsor. Most park amenities include a variety of sports fields, play structures, restrooms and picnic areas.

From 1990 to 1995, the Windsor Golf Club, a public golf course, hosted an event on the PGA's Hogan Tour (later called the Nike Tour and Web.com Tour, currently called the Korn Ferry tour). In April 2017 it hosted the 54-hole women's POCMED Golf Classic, part of the Symetra Tour, the qualifying tour for the Ladies Professional Golf Association.

== Government ==
The Town of Windsor is a general law city governed by a five-member Town Council, including the mayor and vice mayor. The position of mayor became an elected one as of the November 2020 election; the vice mayor is non-elected and is chosen annually among the members of the Town Council. Council members serve four-year staggered terms, with elections occurring every two years. Beginning with the November 2020 election, council members are elected by district rather than city-wide, except for the mayor.

The Town Council hires a Town Manager to carry out policies and serve as executive officer.

As of November 2022, Rosa Reynoza is acting mayor. On April 8, 2021, the San Francisco Chronicle published an article where four women accused then Mayor Dominic Foppoli of sexual assault between 2003 and 2019. Following that, five more women came forward accusing Foppoli of sexual assault, leading to public outrage and calls for him to resign. Foppoli officially resigned on May 21, 2021, after reality TV personality Farrah Abraham publicly accused him of sexually assaulting her.

=== State ===
In the California State Legislature, Windsor is located in the 2nd Senate district and the 2nd Assembly district.

In the United States House of Representatives, Windsor is in California's 2nd congressional district, represented by Democrat Jared Huffman.

According to the California Secretary of State, as of February 10, 2019, Windsor has 15,446 registered voters. Of those, 7,210 (46.7%) are registered Democrats, 3,500 (22.7%) are registered Republicans, and 3,942 (25.5%) have declined to state a political party.

== Education ==
Almost all of Windsor is in the Windsor Unified School District. A small portion of Windsor is in the Mark West Union Elementary School District and Santa Rosa High School District.

In 2009, the Windsor Middle School received award recognition as a California Distinguished School.

=== High schools ===
- Windsor High School
- Windsor Oaks Academy (located on the grounds of Windsor High School)

=== Elementary and middle schools ===
- Brooks Elementary School
- Mattie Washburn Elementary School
- Cali Calmecac Language Academy (charter school) (K-8)
- Windsor Middle School
- Windsor Christian Academy (private school) (K-8)
- New North County Consortium (special education needs)

=== Higher education ===
Local higher education facilities are located near Windsor and within Sonoma County.

- Empire College
- Santa Rosa Junior College
- Sonoma State University

== Infrastructure ==
=== Transportation ===
==== Roads and highways ====
Windsor is served by U.S. Highway 101, which extends through California, Oregon, and Washington.

Windsor has implemented neighborhood traffic management and a calming program. The Town of Windsor is a bicycle friendly community and won an award in 2015 from The League of American Bicyclists.

==== SMART service ====
Sonoma–Marin Area Rail Transit (SMART) line is a voter-approved passenger rail and bicycle-pedestrian pathway project located in Marin and Sonoma counties. The initial operating segment between San Rafael and Charles M. Schulz–Sonoma County Airport opened in 2017, three miles short of Windsor. By April 2016, SMART made known it was seeking up to $38 million in state cap-and-trade funds to extend passenger service north. Funding for the extension to Windsor was secured in June 2023. Service to Windsor station began May 31, 2025.

==== Nearby airport ====
The Charles M. Schulz - Sonoma County Airport (STS) is located just south of Windsor. The airport offers direct flights to Seattle, Portland, San Francisco, Los Angeles, Orange County, San Diego, Las Vegas, Minneapolis, and Phoenix.

The Sonoma County Airport has been home to the Wings Over Wine Country Air Show since 1997. It is the biggest air show in the North Bay, and attracts over 25,000 visitors annually.

=== Library ===
The Sonoma County Library system consists of several branches throughout the county. In 1996, when the Town of Windsor offices moved to a nearby building, the existing Town Hall building was renovated to house the Windsor Regional Library. The new full service branch library at the edge of the Town Green was dedicated on November 3, 1996.

=== Emergency services ===
==== Fire ====
Windsor is served by the Sonoma County Fire District, which was established in April 2019; it is a consolidation of the former Windsor Fire Protection District with three other nearby districts.

==== Police ====
In 1992, the Town of Windsor voted to contract with the Sonoma County Sheriff's Office for the provision of law enforcement services. The most recent agreement, to staff the Windsor Police force with Sonoma County Sheriff's Department employees, was in August 2020, for a five-year period, with the option of two additional five-year renewals.

The Town of Windsor was ranked the 34th safest city on SafeWise's list of "2016 Safest Cities of California". SafeWise has been formally conducting these reports for the past three years and the Town of Windsor has been included every year.

==== EMS ====
The Town of Windsor has a contract with Bell's Ambulance Service to provide advanced life support (ALS) 911 emergency medical services staffed with Paramedics/EMTs 24/7/365. Bell's Ambulance has had a station in Windsor since 1991.

== Notable people ==
- David Ruprecht, television game host of Supermarket Sweep
- Guy Fieri, American television personality
- Scooby Wright, linebacker for the Arizona Wildcats and the Arizona Cardinals and New England Patriots of the NFL
- Barry Mills, leader of the Aryan brotherhood
