= Duncans Point =

Archaeological site in California, United States

Coordinates: 38.393°N 123.0947°W

- Duncan's Landing Site
- U.S. National Register of Historic Places
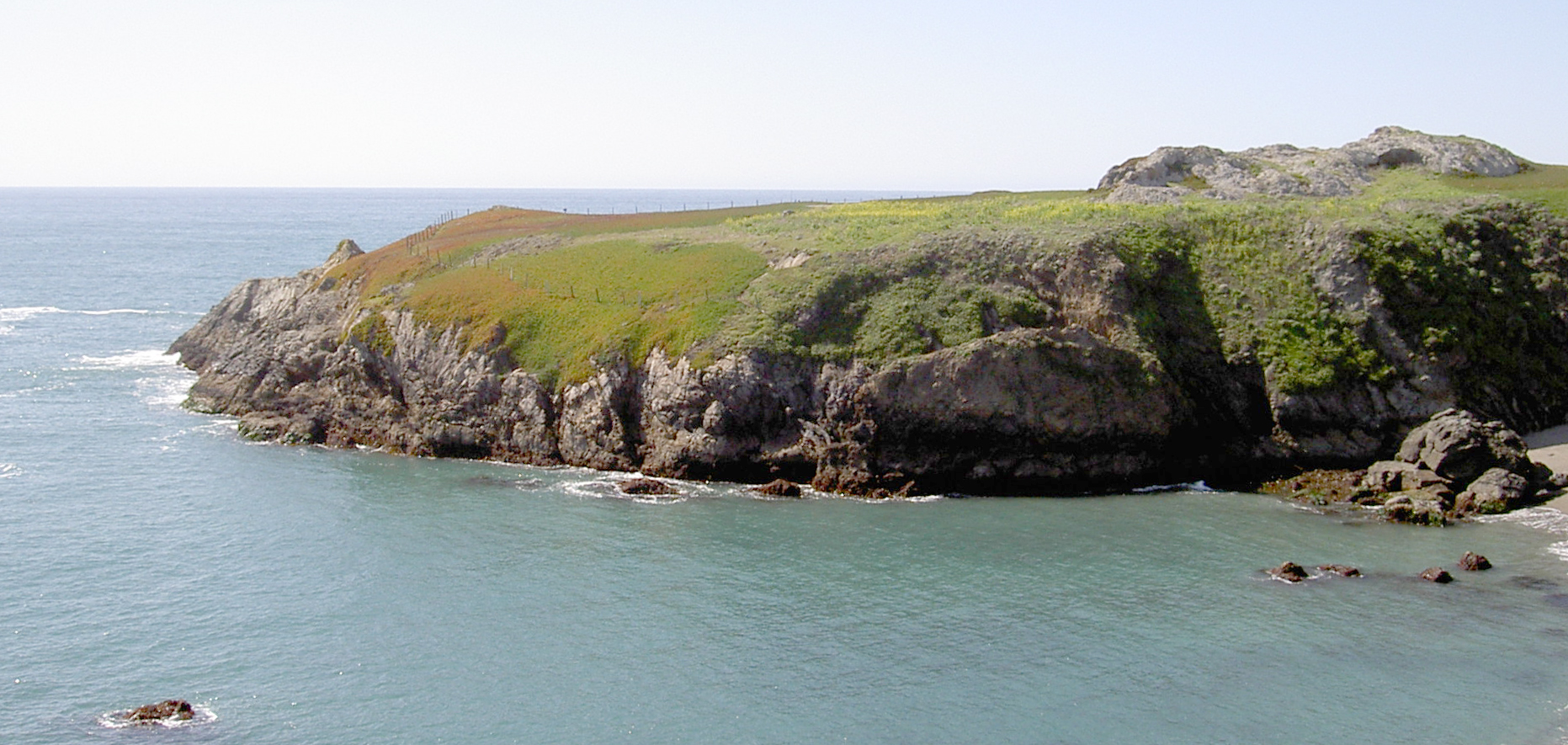
- East side of Duncans Point in 2009

- Location within California Location within the United States
- Nearest city: Jenner, California
- Area: 4 acres (1.6 ha)
- NRHP reference No.: 71000206
- Added to NRHP: November 12, 1971

Duncans Point is a cape on the Pacific Coast of northern California in the United States. It is located in Sonoma County at approximately 45 miles (70 km) northwest of San Francisco and approximately 20 miles (30 km) west of Santa Rosa.

The point lies about halfway between Bodega Head (to the south) and Goat Rock (to the north). It is easily reached from State Route 1. The unincorporated community of Ocean View lies just north of the point.

The peninsula, which is approximately 300 yd (300 m) long, emerges from the coast to the south. It shelters a rocky inlet, named Duncans Cove or Duncans Landing, which is part of the Sonoma Coast State Beach. Duncans Landing is notoriously dangerous, due to large waves and strong surf.

== History ==
Duncans Point marked the southern limit of Pomo territory, and Duncans Landing was a place where coastal ships were loaded with food and lumber for export.

The landing site was listed in the National Register of Historic Places on November 12, 1971.

== Geology ==
Duncans Point is an uplifted wave-cut platform.

== See also ==
- Bodega Head
- Coast Miwok
- National Register of Historic Places listings in Sonoma County, California
