= Joseph Henry Burgess =

American fugitive and suspected serial killer (1947–2009)

- Undated surveillance photo of Burgess taken by New Mexico State Police
- Born: 1946 or 1947; New Jersey, U.S.
- Died: July 16, 2009 (aged 62); Sandoval County, New Mexico, U.S.
- Cause of death: Gunshot wounds
- Other names: "Cookie Bandit" "Job"

Details
- Victims: 1 confirmed, 4–10+ suspected
- Span of crimes: 1972–2009 (suspected)
- Country: United States, Canada
- States: New Mexico, British Columbia

Joseph Henry Burgess (1946 or 1947 – July 16, 2009), sometimes referred to as the Cookie Bandit, was an American fugitive and suspected serial killer. He was the prime suspect in a 1972 double homicide committed in British Columbia, Canada, where he had been hiding to avoid the draft.

He died in a shootout with police in rural New Mexico after being one of Canada's most wanted criminals for 37 years.

== Early life ==
Burgess was born in 1946 or 1947 in New Jersey, where he later attended a Jesuit college and occasionally taught religion classes.

According to authorities, he was a "religious zealot" who sometimes referred to himself as Job, after the Biblical figure. He fled to Canada in the late 1960s to avoid being drafted into the Vietnam War, after which an active warrant was put out for his arrest. Eventually settling in a Children of God commune on the British Columbia Coast, he clashed with other residents due to his religious fervor and rifle ownership.

== Murders and death ==
On June 21, 1972, 20-year-old Ann Durrant and 19-year-old Leif Karlsson were shot multiple times in the head at point-blank range while lying in their sleeping bag on a beach near Tofino on Vancouver Island. According to a woman on the beach, Burgess had been witnessed cleaning a .22 caliber rifle, the type of weapon used in the double homicide. He was said to have disapproved of Durrant and Karlsson's sexual relationship, as they were unmarried. By the time investigators arrived at the scene, Burgess was gone. Present were his fingerprints, crumpled-up handwritten Bible passages, his ID, and other belongings of his.

Burgess was subsequently placed on an Interpol watchlist and was later featured on America's Most Wanted. The activities of Burgess in the following decades remain unclear, and his possible involvement in other crimes across the U.S. and Canada has been speculated.

Burgess is believed to have spent the late 1990s and 2000s burglarizing cabins in New Mexico's Jemez Mountains. During this period, he was nicknamed the Cookie Bandit due to his theft of food, liquor, and survival items. On July 16, 2009, deputies had been conducting a stakeout to catch the then-unidentified thief. After a physical struggle with Burgess, who was attempting to break through the window of a cabin, a gun battle ensued, resulting in the deaths of Burgess and Sgt. Joe Harris.

== Suspected murders ==
Police believe Burgess may have been responsible for other unsolved murders committed between 1972 and 2009. The .357 revolver used to kill Sgt. Joe Harris was registered to David Eley of New Mexico, who was reported missing in 2007 and was a resident of the area where cabins were being burglarized. Eley's remains were found on August 2, 2009, in the Jemez Mountains.

Burgess was initially considered a suspect in the 2004 double homicide of a couple on Fish Head Beach in Jenner, California. His involvement was cleared after Shaun Gallon was convicted of the crime in 2019.

== See also ==
- List of serial killers in the United States
