= Jenner Headlands Preserve =

Nature preserve in Sonoma County, California

- IUCN category V (protected landscape/seascape)
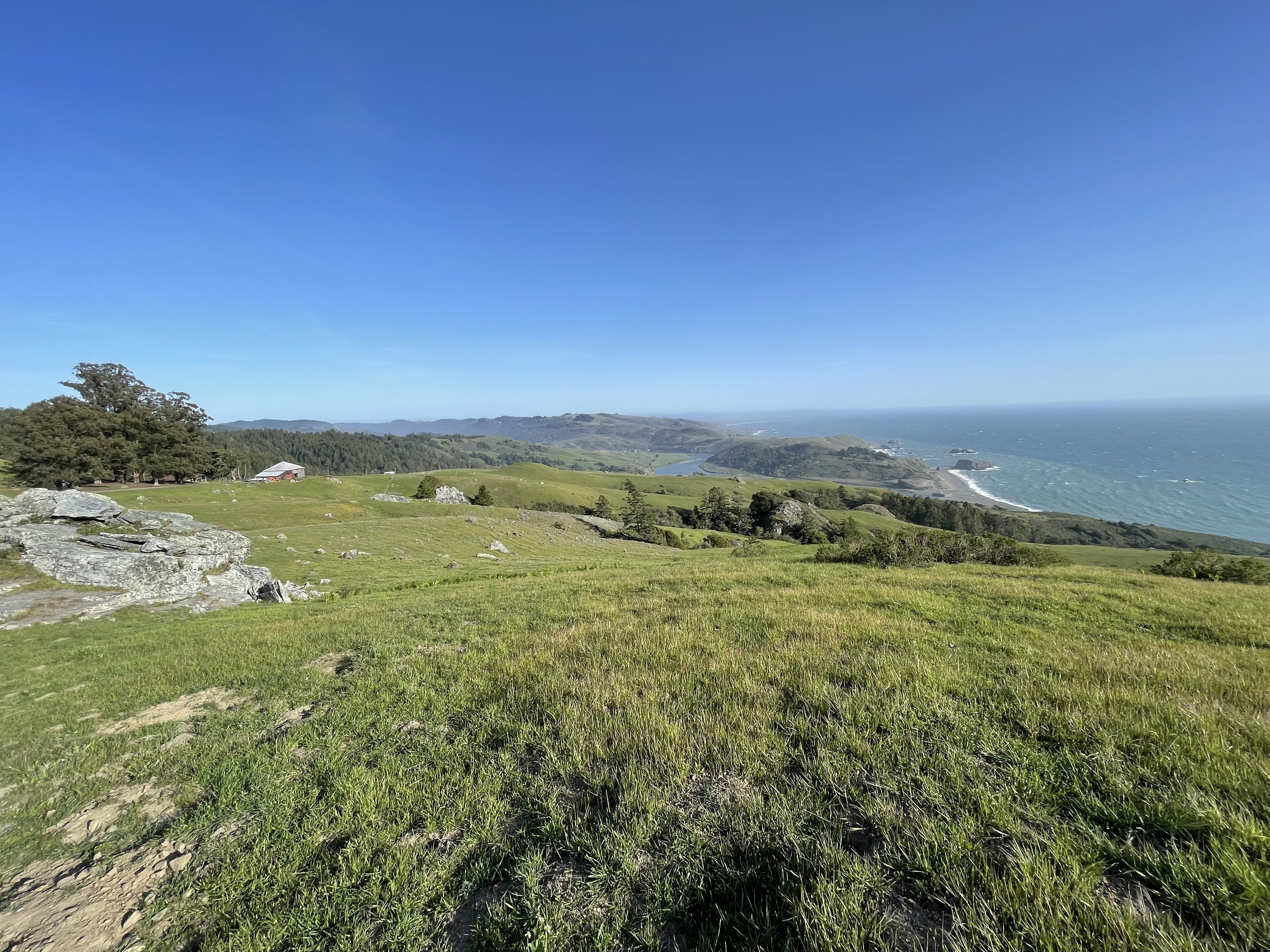
- Russian River mouth

- Location within California
- Interactive map of Jenner Headlands Preserve
- Location: Sonoma County, California
- Nearest city: Jenner, California
- Coordinates: 38°28′12″N 123°7′59″W
- Area: 5,630 acres (2,280 ha)
- Max. elevation: 2,090 ft (640 m)
- Min. elevation: 25 ft (7.6 m)
- Established: 2009
- Operator: The Wildlands Conservancy
- Website: Jenner Headlands Preserve

Jenner Headlands Preserve is a nature preserve on the Sonoma Coast overlooking the Russian River mouth, Goat Rock, and offshore sea stacks. Its landscape combines extensive coastal prairie with dome-like rock outcrops, redwood and Douglas fir forest, oak woodland, chaparral, streams, and wetlands. The ridges connect to nearby Pole Mountain, which offers far-reaching vistas, and the preserve is a site for hawk watching along the Pacific Flyway. The 5,630 acres (2,280 ha) preserve is owned and managed by The Wildlands Conservancy as part of its system of preserves.

== Geography ==
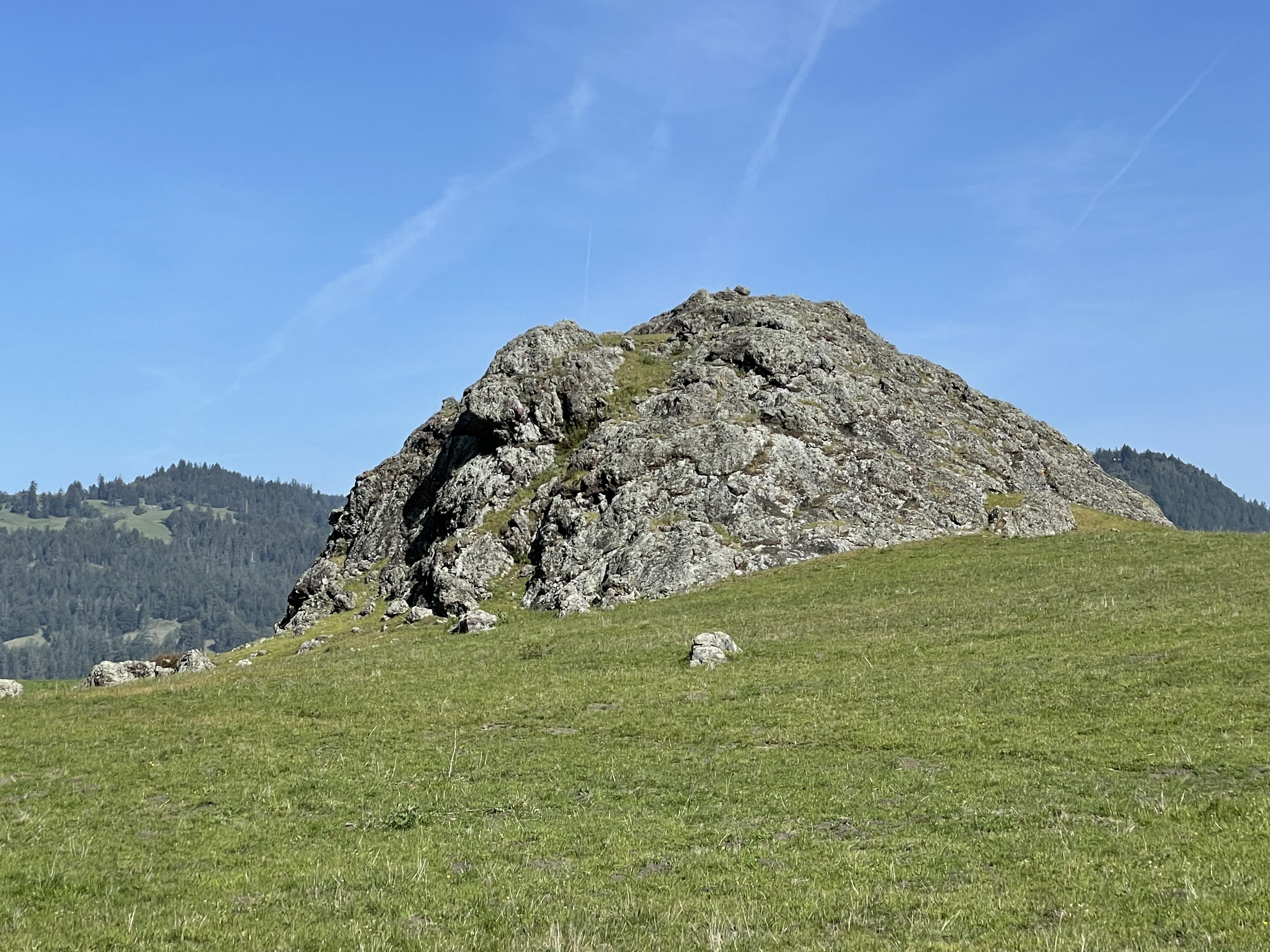
Rock outcrop in coastal prairie

The preserve rises quickly from the Pacific coastline to inland ridges at 2,090 feet (640 m), with lower slopes near 25 feet (7.6 m) above sea level. It includes Russian Gulch, which drains west into the ocean, along with several smaller coastal streams. The landscape is underlain by the Franciscan Complex, with dome-like sandstone and shale outcrops rising prominently above the prairie.

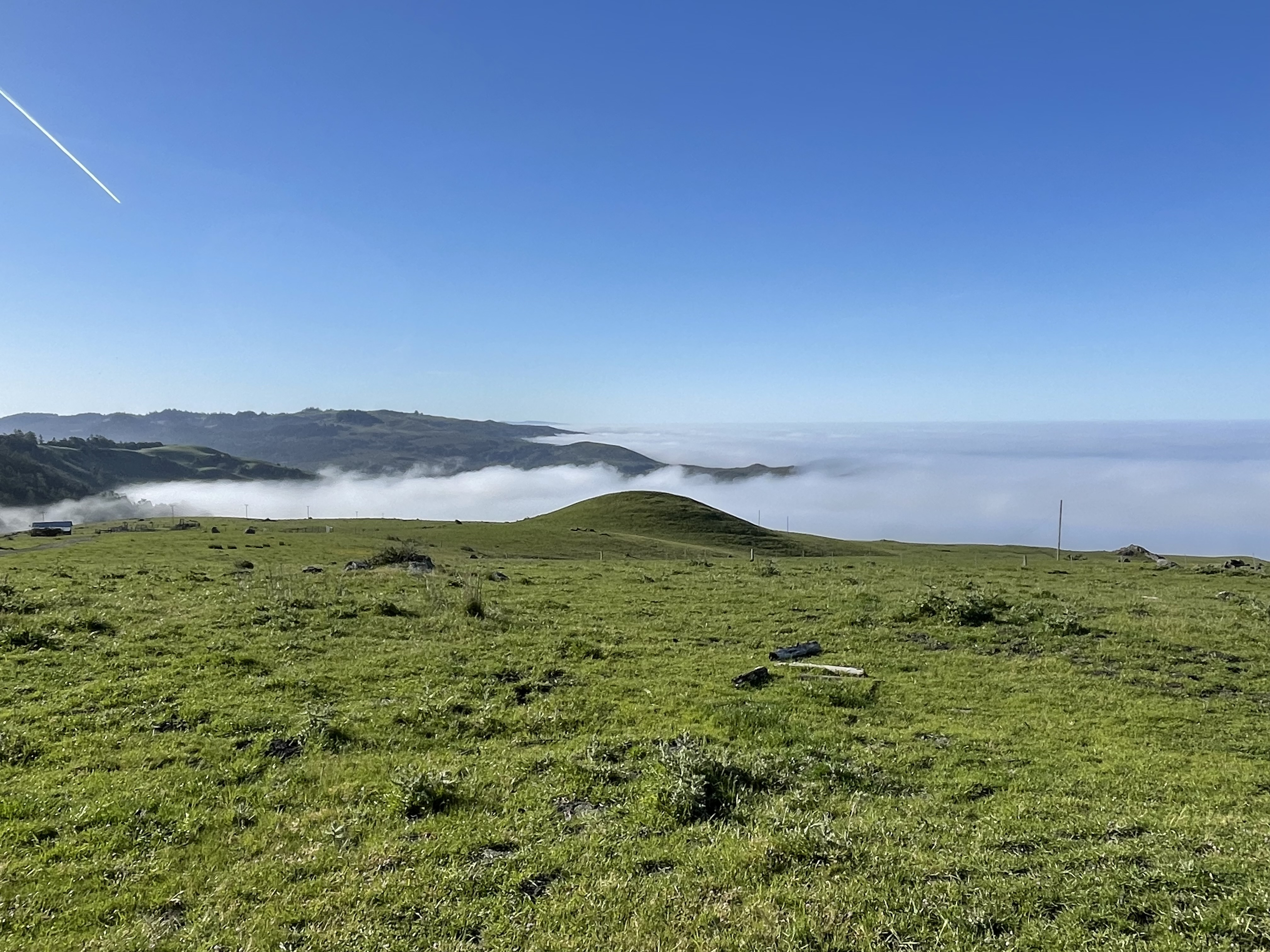
Fog over lower slopes

From the preserve, visitors overlook the Russian River mouth, Goat Rock, and the offshore sea stacks, with distant views to Point Reyes on clear days. From Pole Mountain, views extend inland to the Mayacamas including Mount St. Helena. Fog banks often cover the lower slopes while the ridgelines remain in sun, creating sharp microclimates across short distances.

== Flora and fauna ==
The preserve contains extensive coastal prairie, interspersed with redwood and Douglas fir forests, oak woodland, chaparral, and riparian habitats. Botanical surveys have documented or identified potential habitat for rare plants including coastal bluff morning-glory, Sonoma alopecurus, Franciscan onion, and Baker’s manzanita. Wildflowers include owl’s clover, goldfields, cream cups, blue-eyed grass, and purple needlegrass. Shade-loving plants such as trillium, sorrel, orchids, and ferns grow in gullies and redwood understories, alongside a remnant old-growth redwood known as the “Cathedral Tree”.

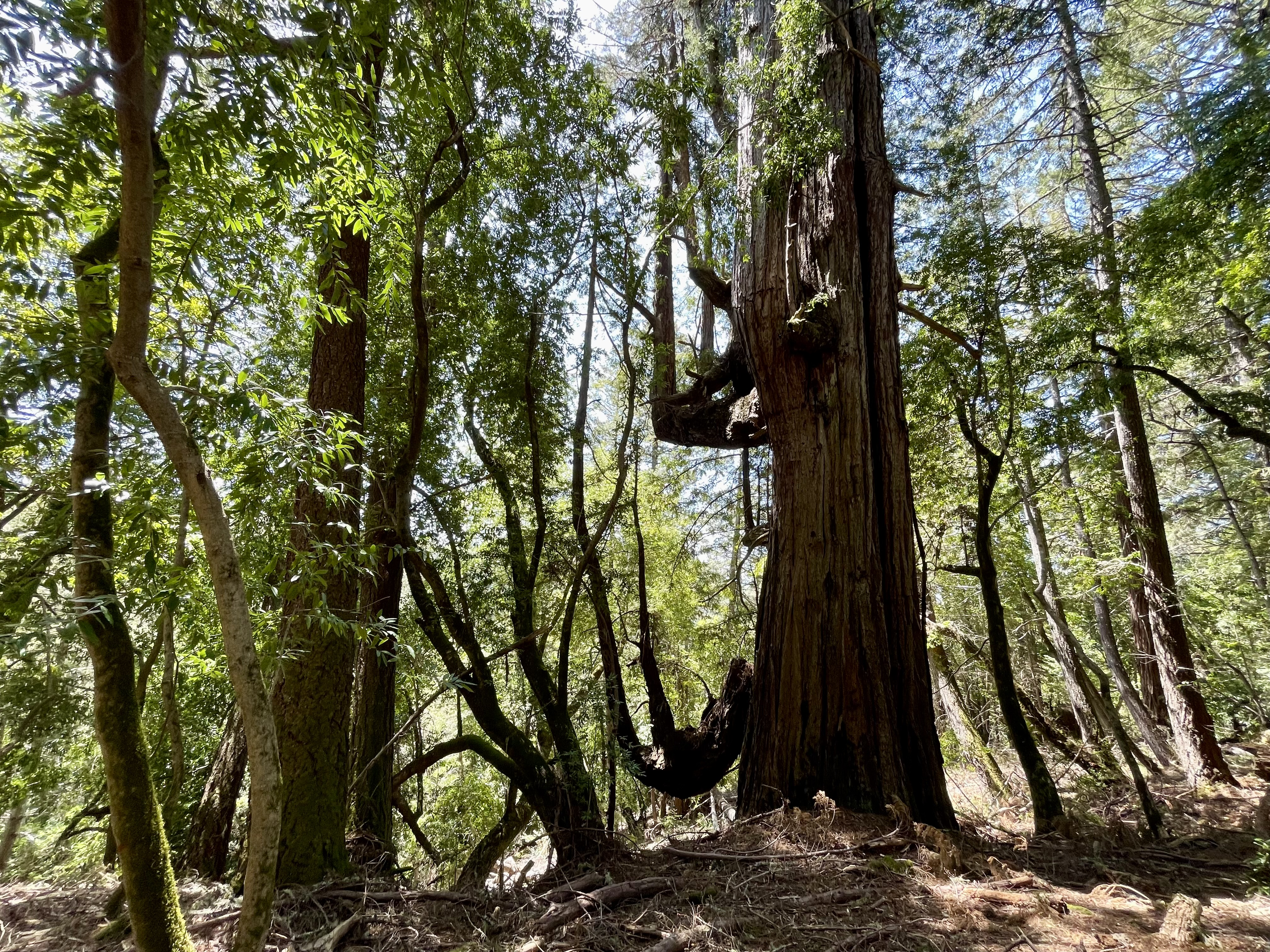
Old-growth redwood “Cathedral Tree”

Avian diversity is high. A 2010 baseline survey by PRBO Conservation Science documented grassland bird species absent from nearby Sonoma Coast State Park, including Grasshopper Sparrow, Lark Sparrow, and Horned Lark, along with special-status birds such as Bryant's Savannah Sparrow and Chestnut-collared Longspur.

A separate bird-monitoring project conducted by Point Blue Conservation Science in 2023–24 evaluated the effects of forest restoration and fuel reduction treatments by repeating baseline breeding bird surveys from 2013–14. The monitoring documented 65 bird species, including 22 focal species such as Olive-sided Flycatcher, Vaux's Swift, and Purple Martin, and found that restoration treatments did not reduce bird diversity.

The preserve lies along the Pacific Flyway, and fall raptor migration is a notable feature. Species observed include red-tailed hawks, peregrine falcons, northern harriers, osprey, bald eagles, and great horned owls.

Other wildlife includes deer, bobcats, coyotes, mountain lions, steelhead trout, red-bellied newts, slender salamanders, and western forest scorpions.

== History ==
Efforts to acquire Jenner Headlands began in 2005, led by Sonoma Land Trust and the Sonoma County Agricultural Preservation and Open Space District, which raised $36 million to purchase the property in 2009. Funding came from state and federal agencies and private foundations, with The Wildlands Conservancy providing $10.6 million in loans and guarantees when funding lagged. At the time it was the most expensive single conservation transaction in Sonoma County.

Ownership was transferred to The Wildlands Conservancy, which partnered with Sonoma Land Trust and other groups to plan for restoration and public access. In 2014, Sonoma Land Trust purchased the 238-acre Pole Mountain property, creating a ridgeline route that links it to Jenner Headlands. Between 2015 and 2018, a visitor trailhead was constructed at the highway entrance to provide facilities and trail access, and the preserve opened to the public on September 7, 2018.

== Conservation ==
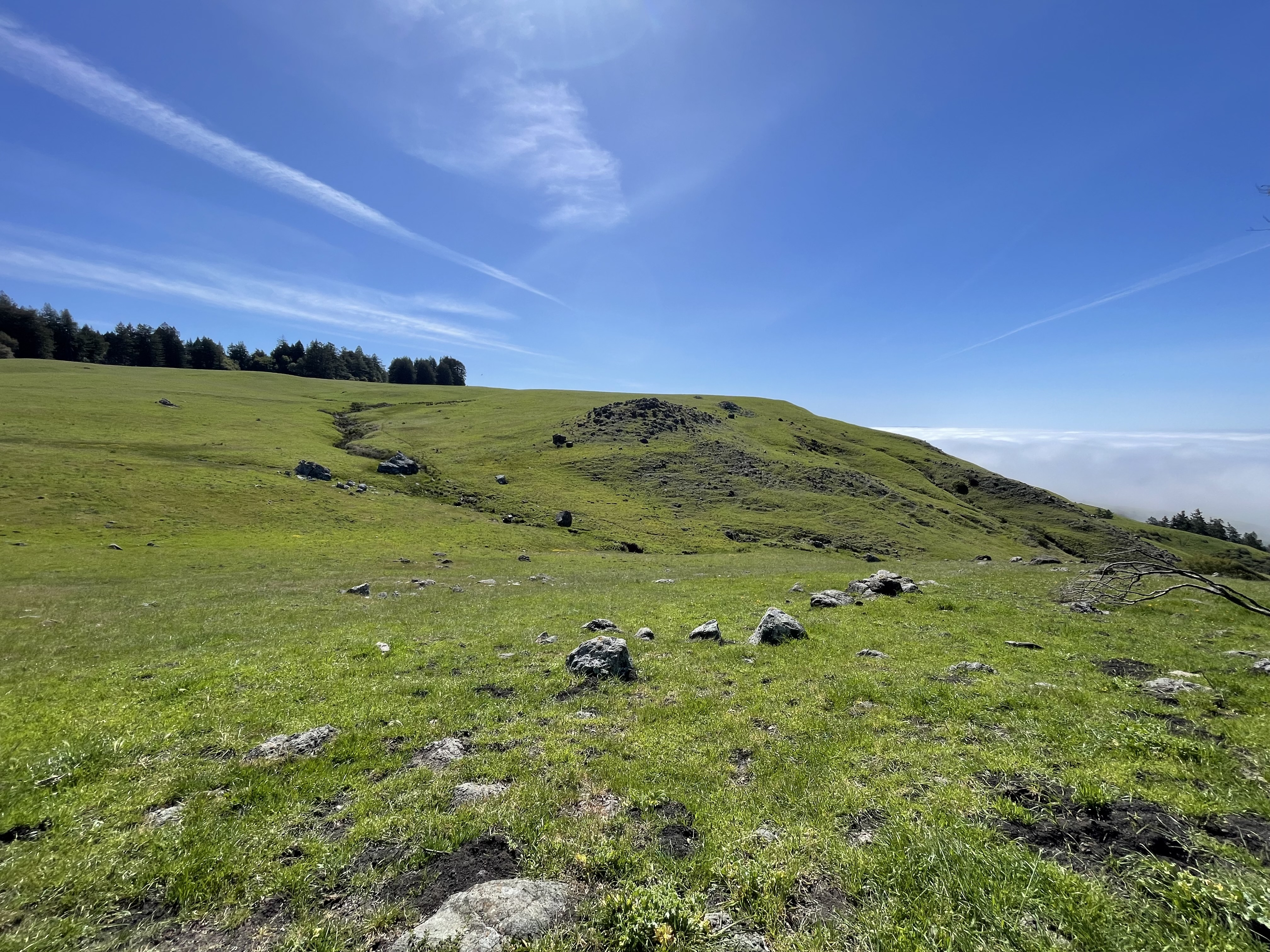
Coastal prairie managed through grazing

Conservation projects at Jenner Headlands have included restoration, habitat management, and fire resiliency. Wetland restoration and erosion control accompanied construction of public access facilities in 2016. In the East Branch of Russian Gulch, large woody debris barriers were removed to restore salmonid passage and spawning habitat, and monitoring in 2025 documented the return of juvenile endangered coho salmon for the first time since 1965. To maintain biodiversity in the 1,400-acre coastal prairie, The Wildlands Conservancy implemented rotational grazing infrastructure improvements in 2022. Vegetation management has also targeted invasive plants, Sudden Oak Death, and wildfire risk through shaded fuel breaks and prescribed fire projects.

== Recreation ==
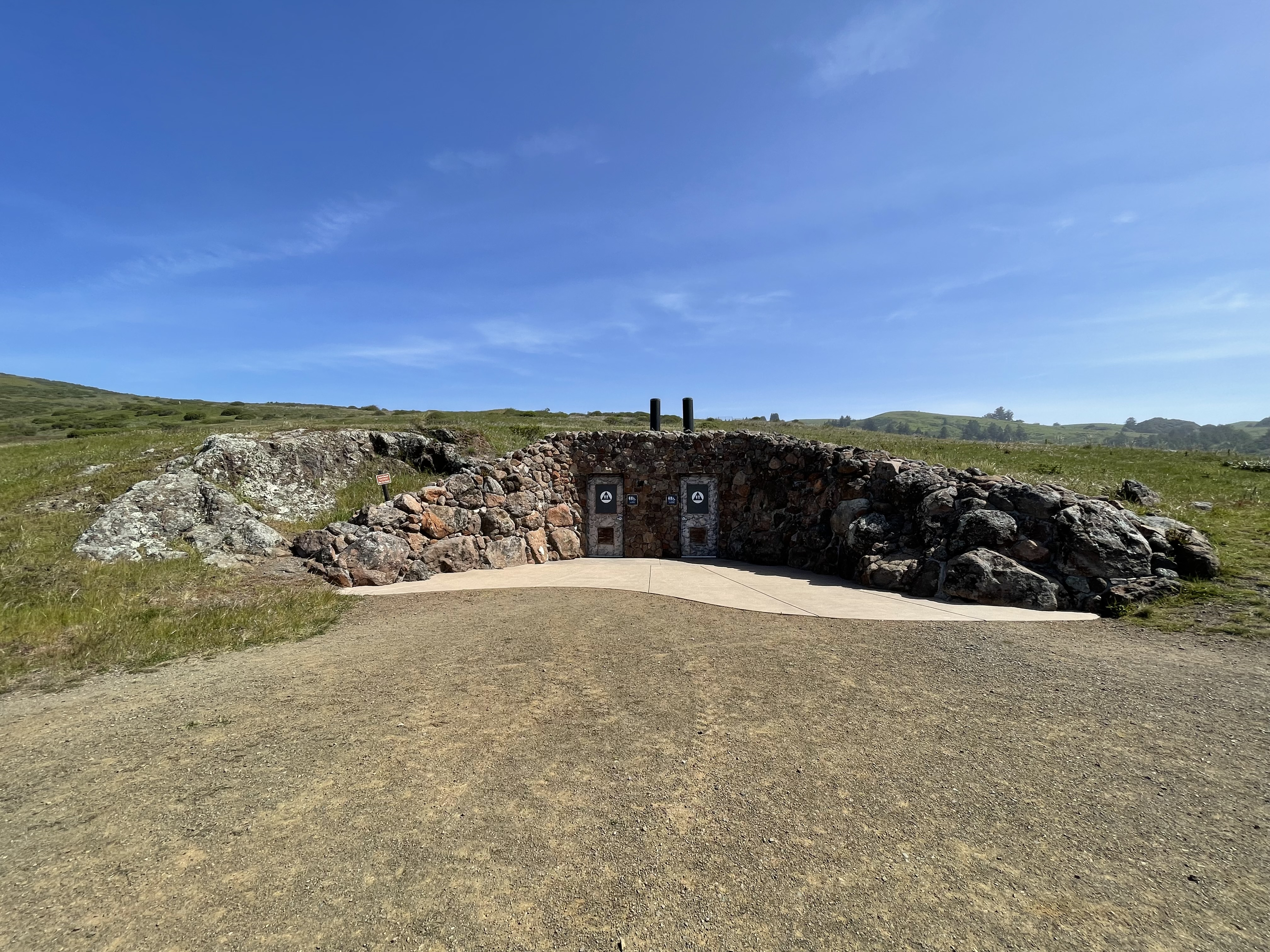
Trailhead restroom with living roof

The preserve’s entrance area on Highway 1 includes parking, picnic tables, restrooms with a living roof, interpretive kiosks, and a short ADA-accessible trail. Sentinel Point is a knoll overlooking the coast.

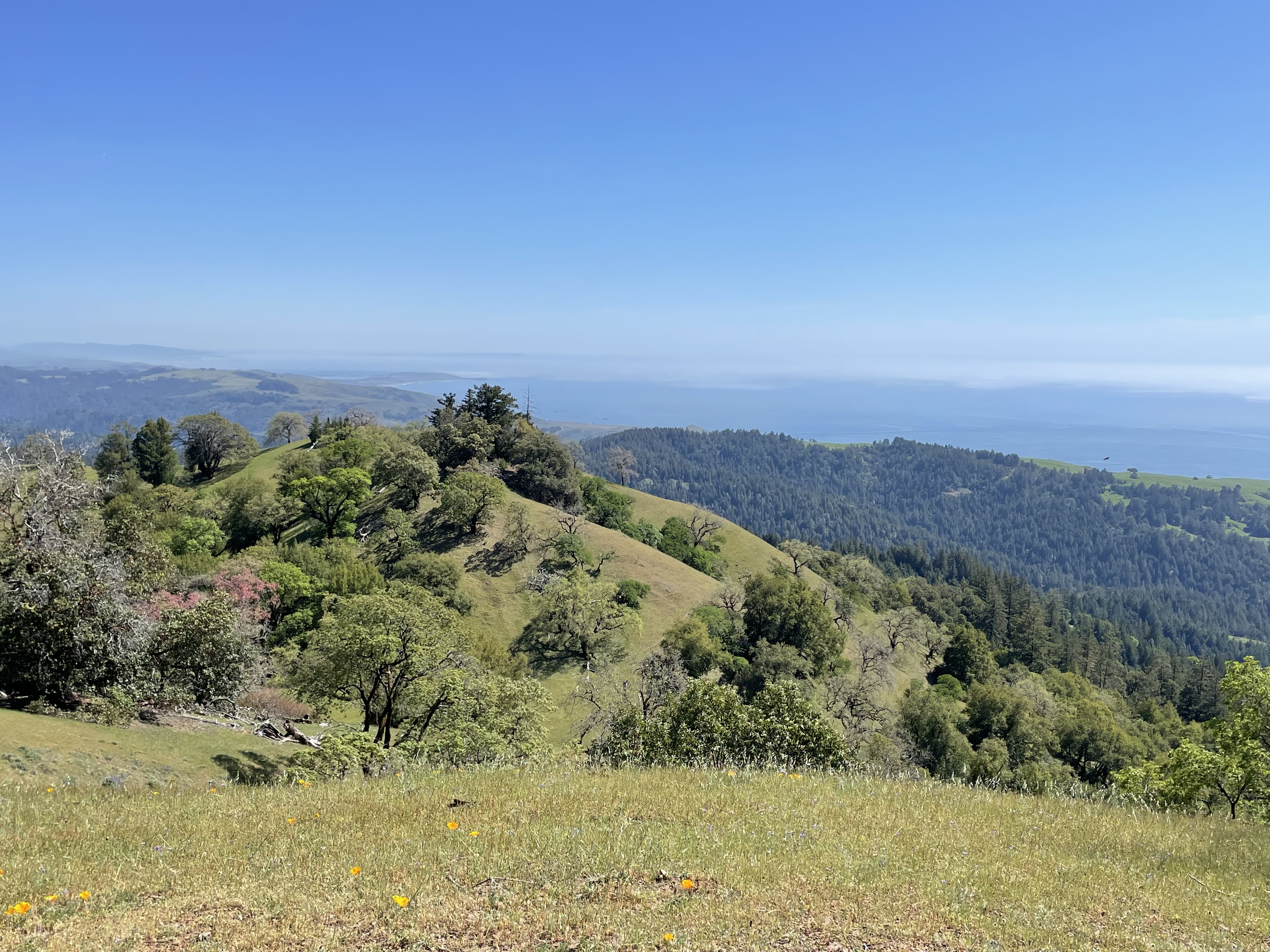
Ocean view from Pole Mountain

The Coastal Prairie Loop traverses open grassland with views of the Pacific. Hawk’s Hill is a raptor viewing area. Other trails include the Wildflower Loop and the Russian Gulch Trail, which passes through streamside habitat.

The Sea to Sky Trail connects the preserve to the summit of Pole Mountain.

== Education and programs ==
Jenner Headlands is used as a site for educational programs and volunteer activities. The preserve hosts interpretive hikes, invasive plant removal projects, and grazing demonstrations for land managers. Citizen scientists contribute to Hawk Watch raptor counts, and scientific monitoring partnerships with Point Blue Conservation Science and the Cornell Lab of Ornithology study bird communities and forest resilience.

== Works ==
- "Jenner Headlands – Pole Mountain". OpenRoad with Doug McConnell. NBC Bay Area. March 11, 2018.

== See also ==
- List of The Wildlands Conservancy preserves
- Estero Americano Coast Preserve
- Sonoma Coast State Park
