= Duncans Cove =

Duncans Cove can refer to:

- Duncans Cove, a small bay in northern California
- Duncan's Cove, Nova Scotia
