= Sonoma Coast State Park =

State of California property in Sonoma County

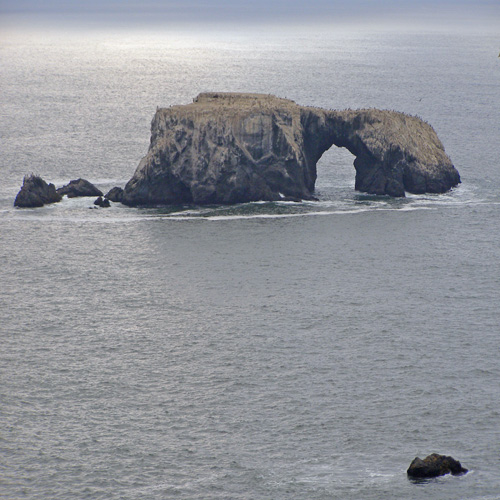
- Interactive map of Sonoma Coast State Park
- Location: Sonoma County, California
- Nearest city: Jenner
- Coordinates: 38°22′8.39″N 123°4′25.28″W
- Governing body: California Department of Parks and Recreation

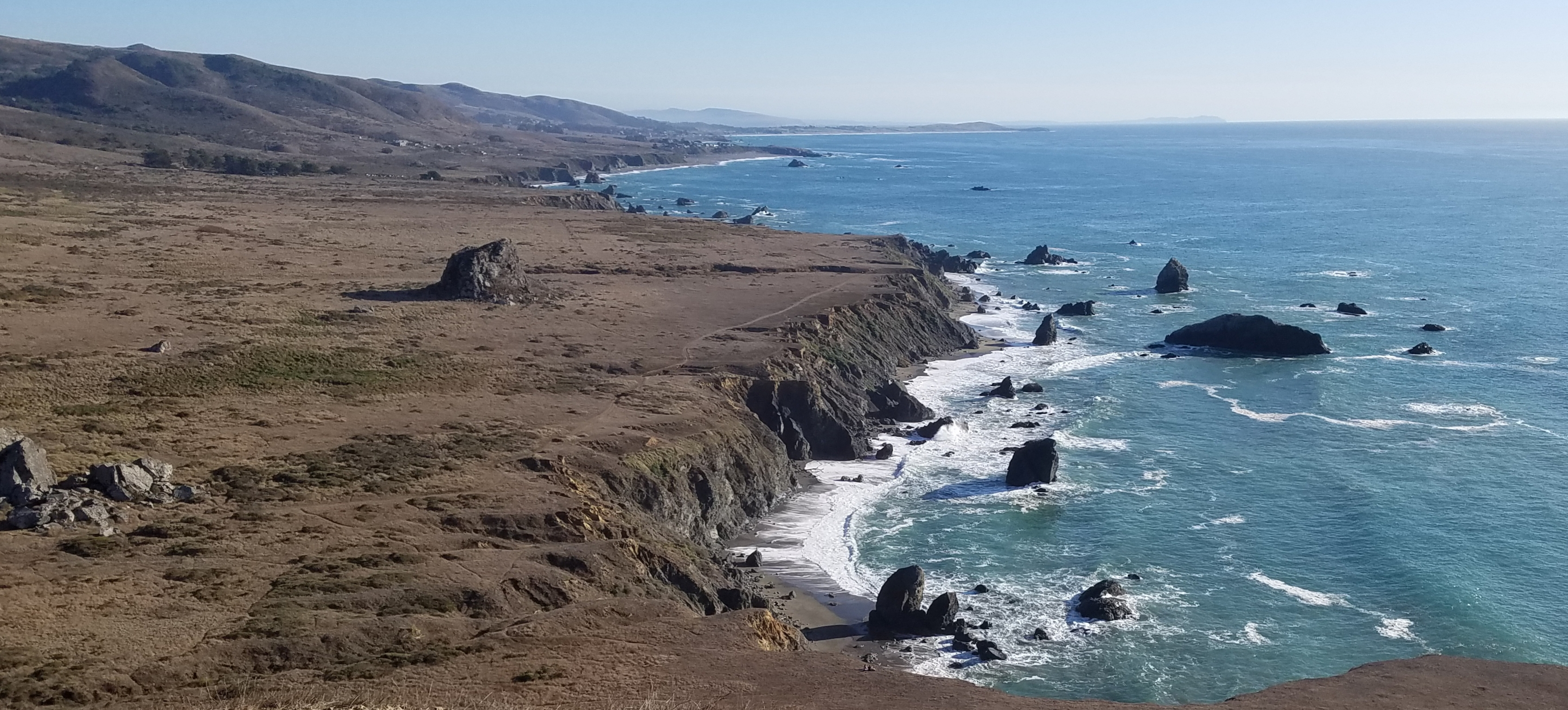
View southward from Peaked Hill near the north end of the Kortum Trail. Sunset Boulders are visible on the lower left edge of the photo.

Sonoma Coast State Park is a State of California property in Sonoma County consisting of public access use on lands adjoining the Pacific Ocean. This extent of beach runs from a coastal point about 4 miles (6 km) north of Jenner and continues for approximately 17 miles (27 km) to the south to terminate at Bodega Head. The property lies along State Route 1 and consists of a number of named beaches including Arched Rock Beach, Gleason Beach and Goat Rock Beach. The ecosystem consists of alternating sandy beaches and rocky shoreline, with a marine terrace extending above the entire extent with an upland California coastal prairie habitat.

== Geology ==
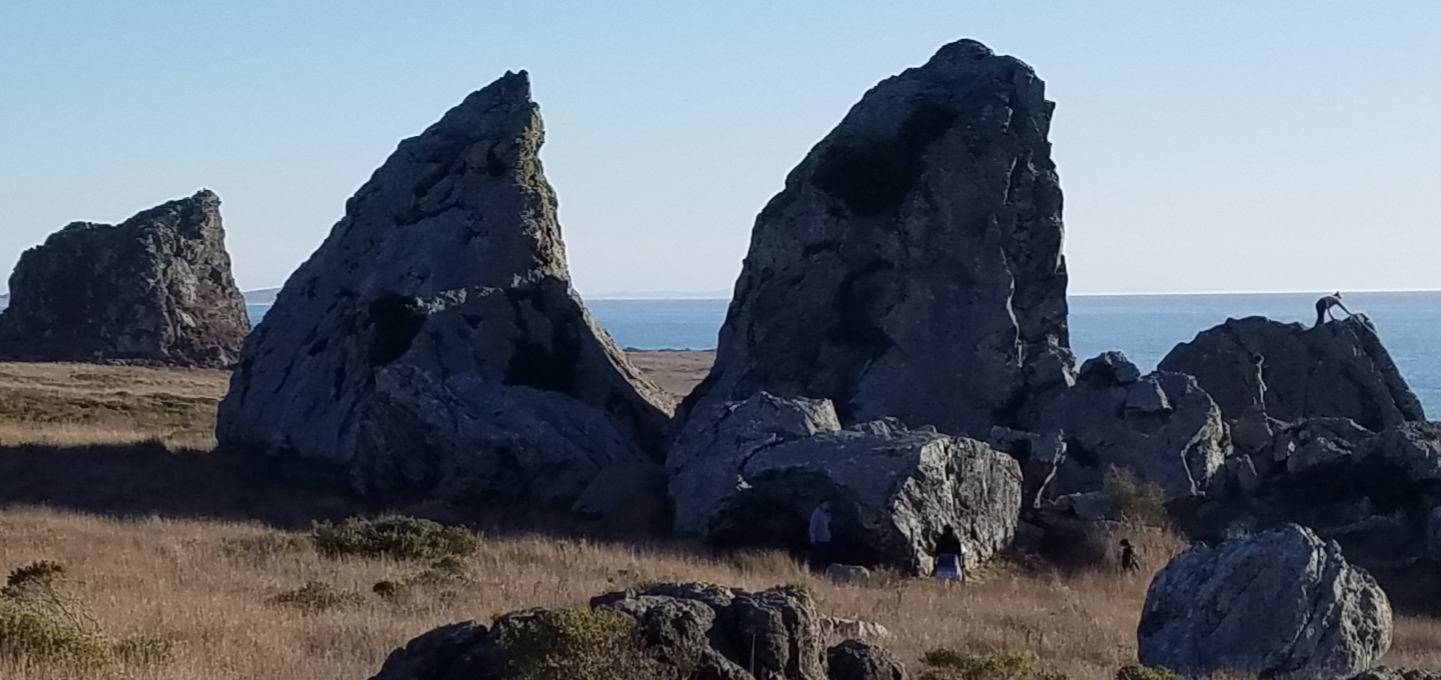
Sunset Boulders (also known as Mammoth Rocks) are a popular bouldering site with evidence of use by ancient mammoth. A climber atop the rightmost boulder illustrates scale.

This strip of coastal property is subject to continuing marine erosion as well as windborne erosion, thus creating a situation where an average of one to three feet (30 to 90 cm) per year of land mass is lost. Obviously in years of heavy storms this value can be higher, whereas, in a less stormy year the land erosion can be lower. Over the last geologic epoch the land has been subject to uplift, a process which has created a marine terrace of the entire extent of the property. This marine terrace is elevated approximately 50 to 100 feet (15 to 30 meters) above mean sea level, which results in a steep bluff directly above the littoral zone.

Vertical rock formations are a geological hallmark of this site, and have weathered far less than the bulk of the soils. These features are known as sea stacks, and they appear standing out of the water or on the beach as though as sculptures placed decoratively along the shoreline. Occasionally these stacks appear as adornments on the marine terrace, indicating their ancient origin on the sea floor prior to uplift. These rock formations are composed of sandstone with layers of quartz.

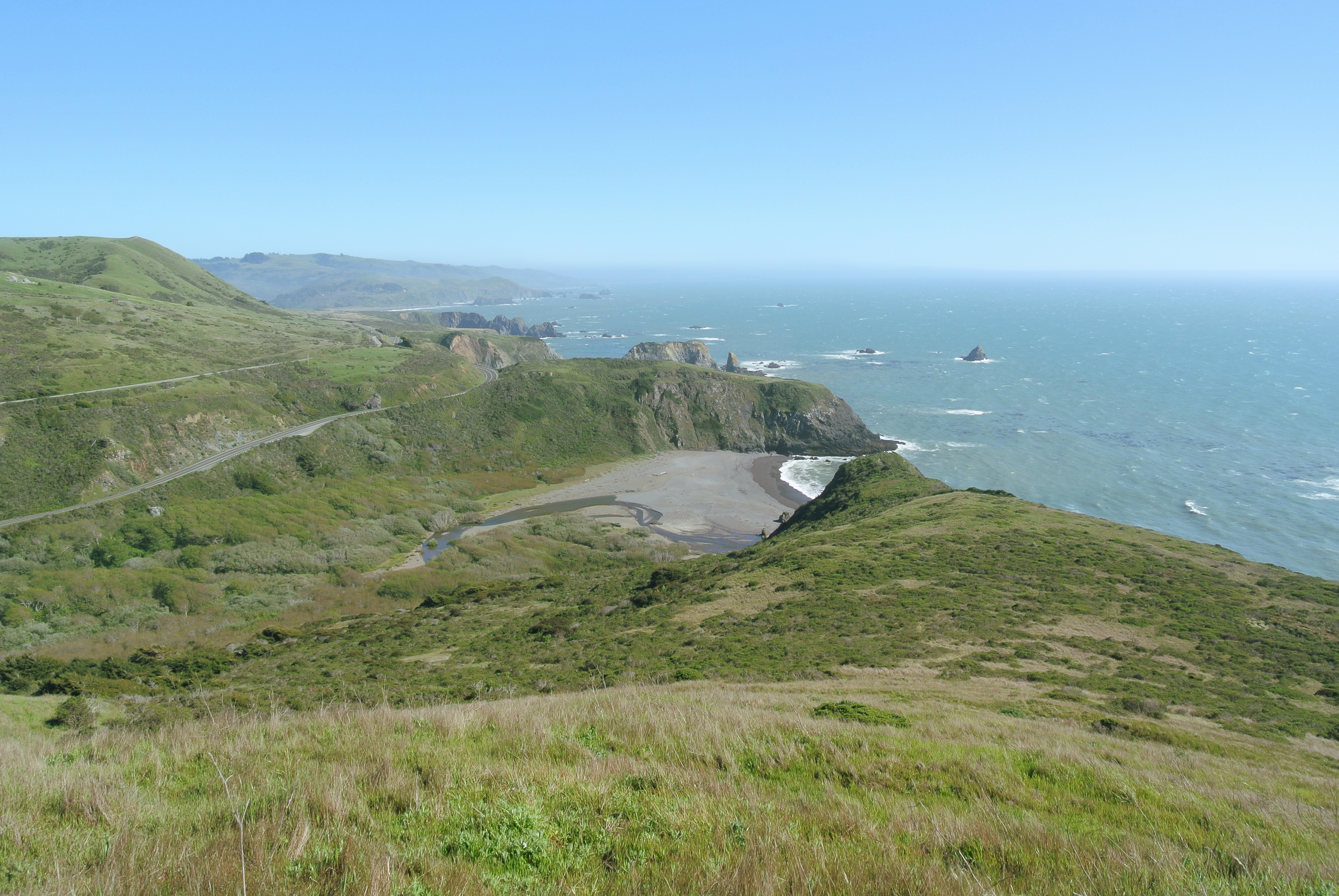
Coastal prairie in the Sonoma Coast State Park north of Jenner

The active San Andreas Fault runs roughly parallel and near to the coastline of Sonoma Coast State Park. Soils within the site are classified as coastal beach sands (where rocky shoreline is not evident) and marine escarpment group soils on the marine terrace; typically soils above the marine terrace are in the Rohnerville loam group. Most of the beach sands consist of a medium coarse brown to gray sandy materials, reflecting the high rate of erosion of escarpment soils into the ocean. There are patches of smooth pebble beach such as the approximately one hundred meter stretch lying immediately north of Goat Rock.

== Ecology ==
The habitats include marine, littoral and coastal prairie. In the marine environment are found gray whales, harbor seals and California sea lions as well as a multitude of fish species and other marine organisms. There are also modest kelp beds and other marine vegetation. The littoral beach environment has fewer organisms than more southerly zones, because of the colder temperatures; however, there are tidepools which are abundant with marine flora and fauna.

Russian River State Marine Reserve and Russian River State Marine Conservation Area and Bodega Head State Marine Reserve & Bodega Head State Marine Conservation Area protect area resources. Like underwater parks, these marine protected areas help conserve ocean and freshwater wildlife and marine ecosystems.

The coastal prairie soils are moderately well drained and granular in nature with moderate soil permeability; these features lead to slight erosion potential and moderately high bio-productivity. Acidity of these loamy soils is medium to high, and thus some vegetative stunting and hospitality to rare plants is offered. The upland environment on the coastal prairie offers a variety of grasses and wildflowers including varieties of lupine, thistle and wild oats. The typical annual plant productivity is approximately 3,300 lb (1,500 kg) per acre (3700 kg/ha) of air-dried yield per annum in an abundant moisture year, and about half that amount in a very dry year. A variety of birds and mammals thrive on the coastal prairie including numerous California Mule Deer, Odocoileus hemionus californicus. The adjacent Ocean Song preserve expands the protected area for wildlife and natural vegetation to include ridge-top habitats of the California Coast Ranges.

== History ==
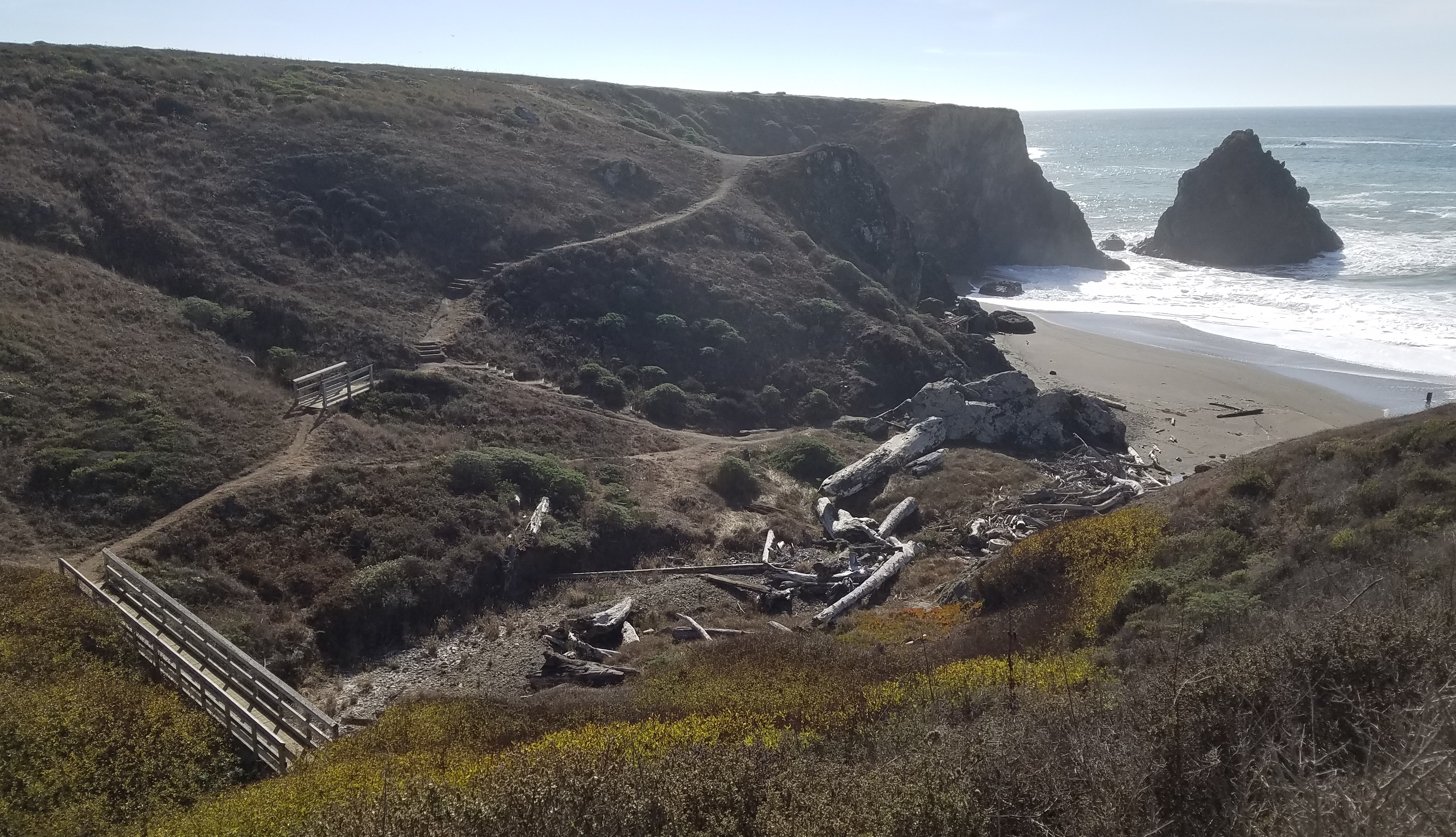
Furlong Gulch is the deepest gulch crossed by the Kortum Trail and has the easiest beach access along the trail.

Some of the oldest natural history of this area related to mammals are a blueschist rock formation about one mile (1.6 km) south of the Russian River. There is found a sea stack formation with prominent rubbing marks about two to four meters in elevation, a height too high to have been caused by modern bovids. Mammoths are believed to have roamed here as recently as 40,000 years ago, and they are thought to have created these severe rubbing marks. Mammoth fossil remains have been found at Bodega Head at the south end of Sonoma Coast State Park.

Earliest known human settlement of this site was by the Coast Miwok and Pomo tribes. As early as 1849 archaeological finds were recorded on this property, and to date dozens of prehistorical kitchen middens and other types of tribal habitation finds have been made. The property is part of the Mexican land grant Rancho Bodega. The Russians are thought to have begun logging the old-growth forests directly above the coastal prairie in the early 19th century.

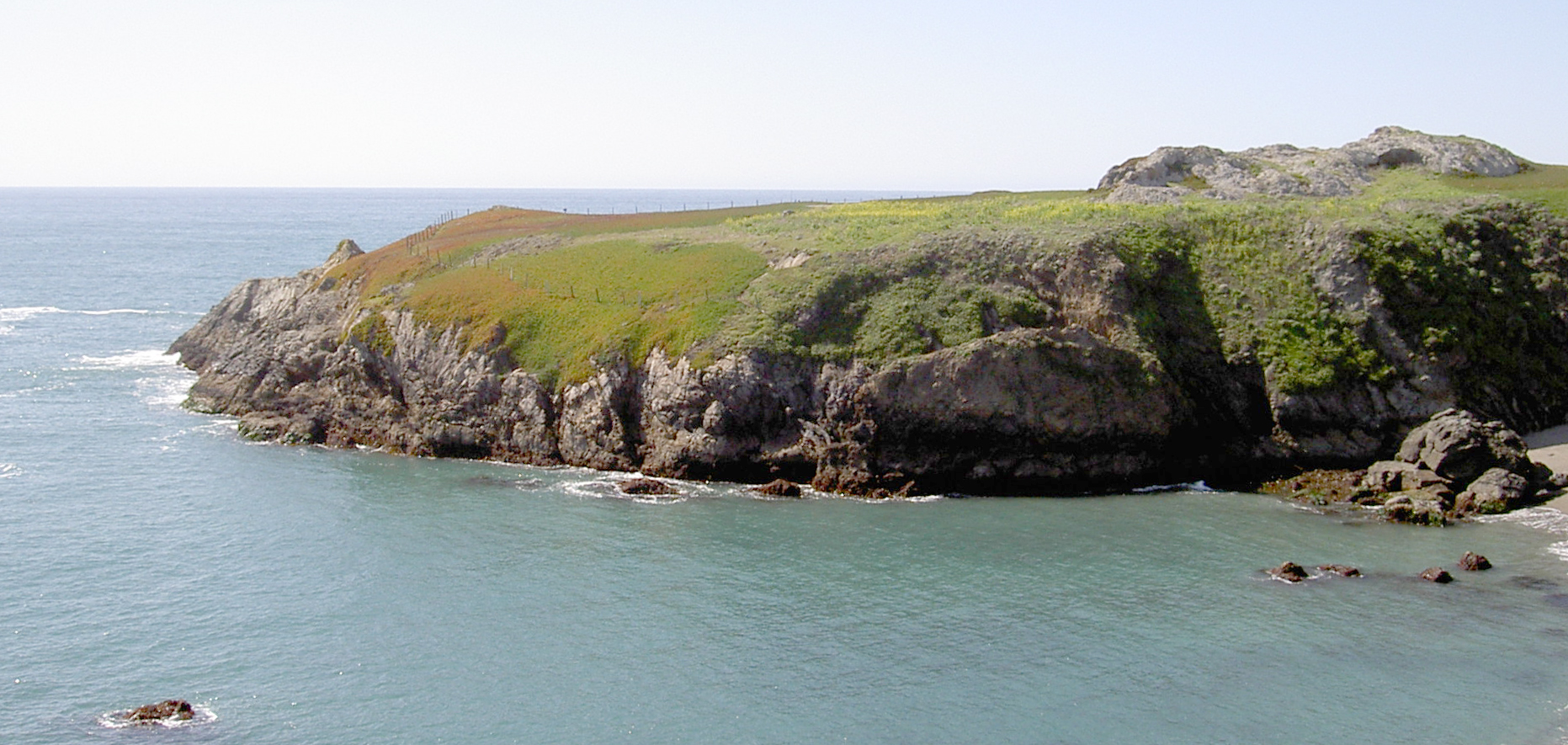
Duncans Point in 2009

The underwater delineation of the property is considered to extend to 1,000 feet (300 m) from the shoreline. While no shipwrecks have been discovered, the literature indicates that there are 17 vessels which may have been lost in these waters. There are remains of numerous historic barns and other agricultural buildings on the coastal prairie indicating 19th century settlement by Europeans; at Duncans Point there are iron pins embedded in the sandstone bluffs as evidence of the active shipping industry here in the late 19th century and early 20th century.

== California Coastal Trail ==
The park is along the California Coastal Trail. State route 1 was rerouted due to sea level rise at Gleason Beach and was repurposed to improve the trail.

=== Kortum Trail ===
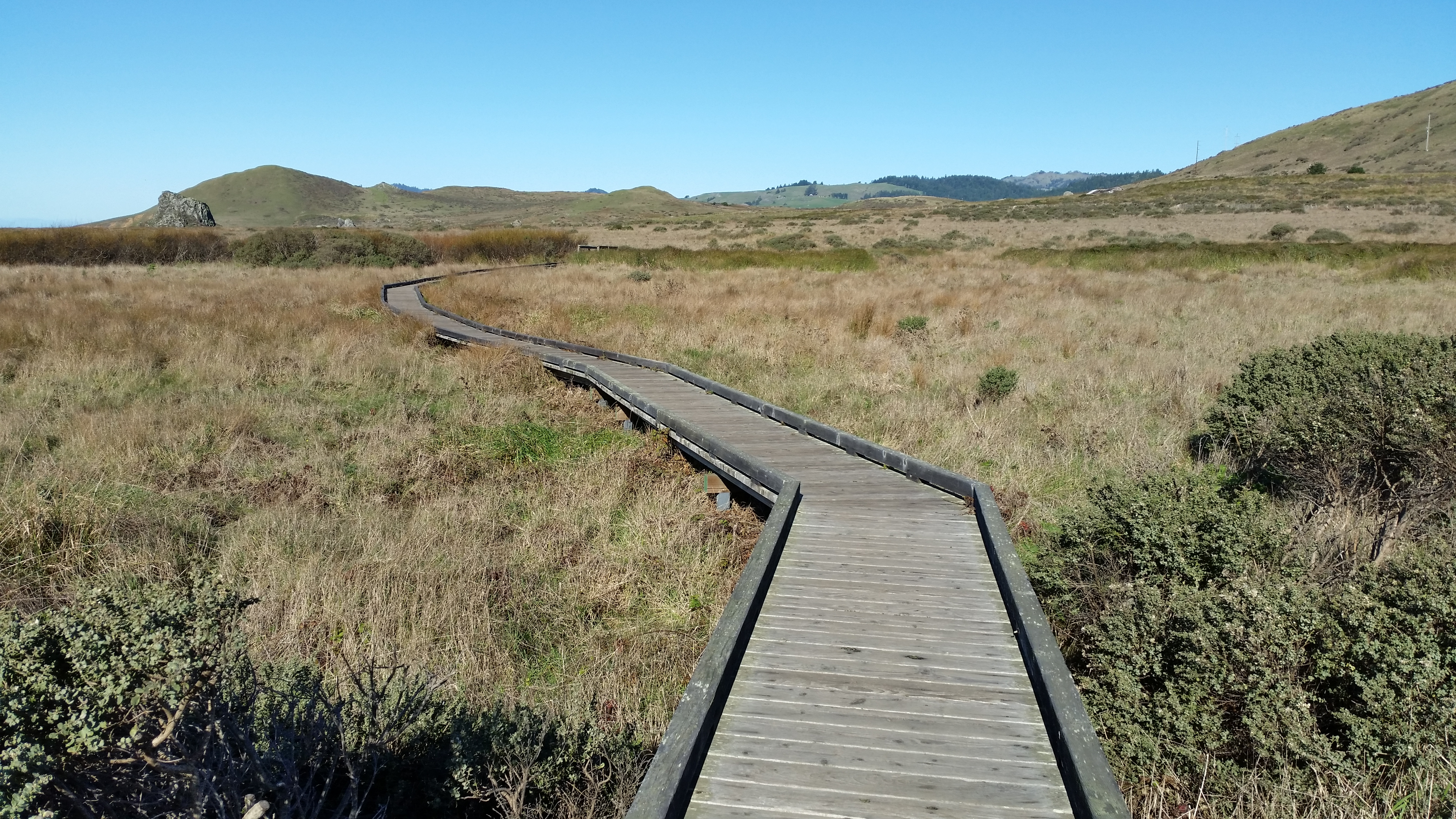
Kortum Trail includes this wooden walkway over wetlands within California's Sonoma Coast State Park.

Although some parts of the park are too steep for easy access between Route 1 and the ocean, Kortum Trail is convenient for hiking between highway access points at Goat Rock, Shell Beach, and Wright's Beach. Total trail length is approximately 3.8 mi (6.1 km). The well-maintained trail includes wooden walkways across wetlands and bridges over streams. Side trails offer access to the beach and to bouldering opportunities at Sunset Boulders. Whales may be seen offshore and wildflowers, birds, and deer can be observed within the coastal park.

The trail was named for Sonoma County environmentalist Bill Kortum (1927–2014). Bill's mother was a descendant of the Donner Party and his father's parents were early California winemakers in the upper Napa Valley. After spending his youth on a Petaluma poultry and dairy farm, Bill studied veterinary medicine at Santa Rosa Junior College and the University of California, Davis. His travels as a bovine veterinarian gave him an appreciation for California's disappearing rural landscape, and encouraged his environmental activism for formation of the California Coastal Commission.

== See also ==
- Jenner Headlands Preserve
- Doran Regional Park
- Estero Americano Coast Preserve
- Salmon Creek, California
- Sonoma Coast State Marine Conservation Area
- List of beaches in Sonoma County, California
- List of California state parks
- List of Sonoma County Regional Parks facilities
