= Goat Rock Beach =

Beach in Sonoma County, California

- Beach
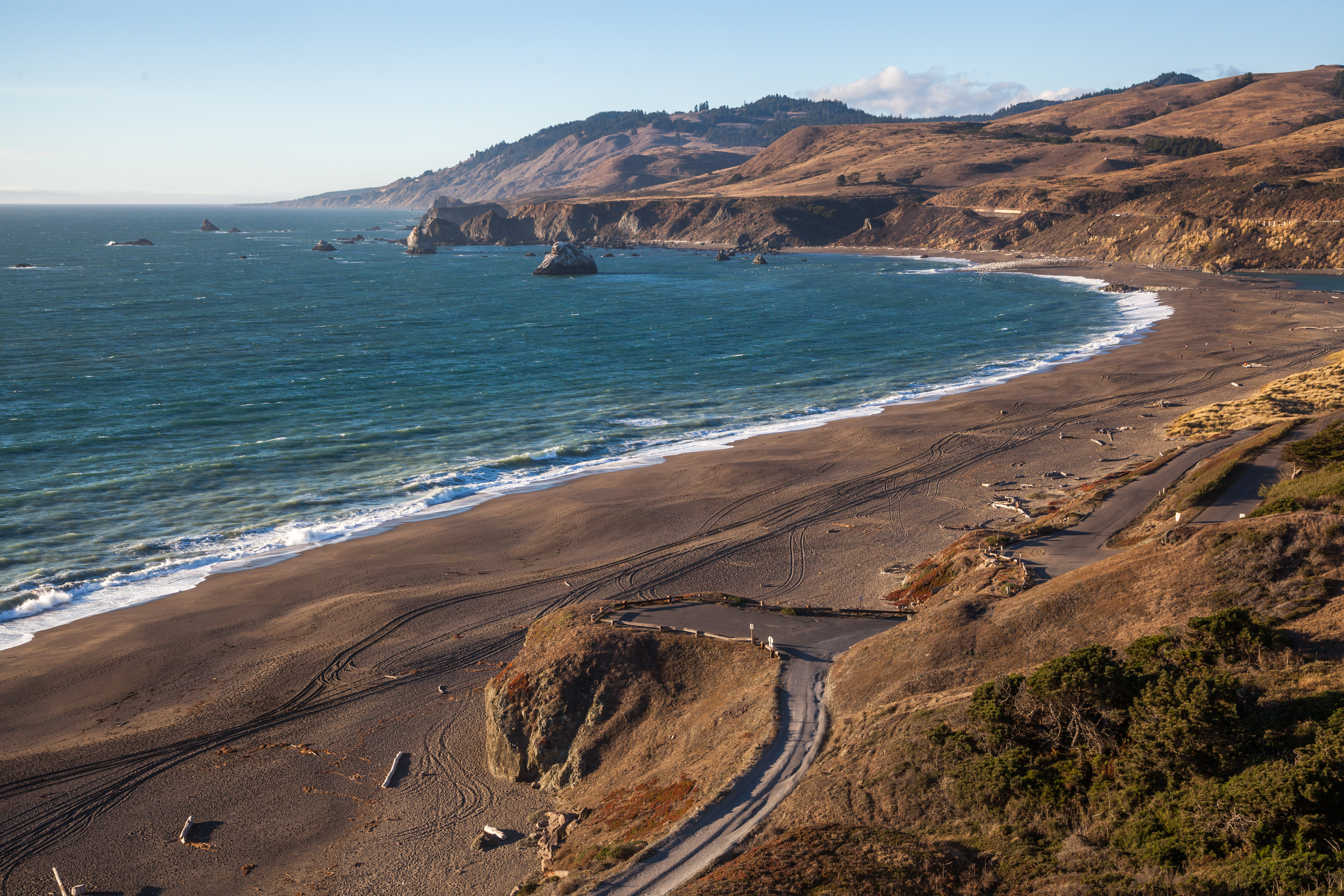
- Goat Rock Beach
- Interactive map of Goat Rock Beach
- Coordinates: 38°26′48″N 123°7′35″W
- Location: Sonoma County, California
- Part of: Sonoma Coast State Beach
- Water bodies: Russian River (California)
- Operator: State of California

Goat Rock Beach is a sand beach in northwestern Sonoma County, California, United States. This landform is a sub-unit of Sonoma Coast State Beach, owned and managed by the State of California. At the northern terminus of Goat Rock Beach is the mouth of the Russian River, and the southern end of this crescent shaped expanse is the massive Goat Rock, an iconic outcrop of the Sonoma Coast, which is barely attached to the mainland by a narrow isthmus.

Goat Rock Beach is frequented by beachcombing visitors, but usually not in high numbers, except in mid-summer; there is some wading and surfing activity, although these uses are moderated by the rip current generated by a steep gradient into the water that leads to an underwater trench parallel to the waterline. The beach is also a regular resting ground for a variety of gulls (including Western Gull, California Gull, and Ring Billed Gull), river otters, elephant seals, harbor seals, and sea lions, with the latter three species often hauling out of the Pacific Ocean. The state of California recommends that a 50-yard (46 m) distance be preserved between human visitors and the seasonal marine mammals, especially in the pupping season.

== Vicinity features ==
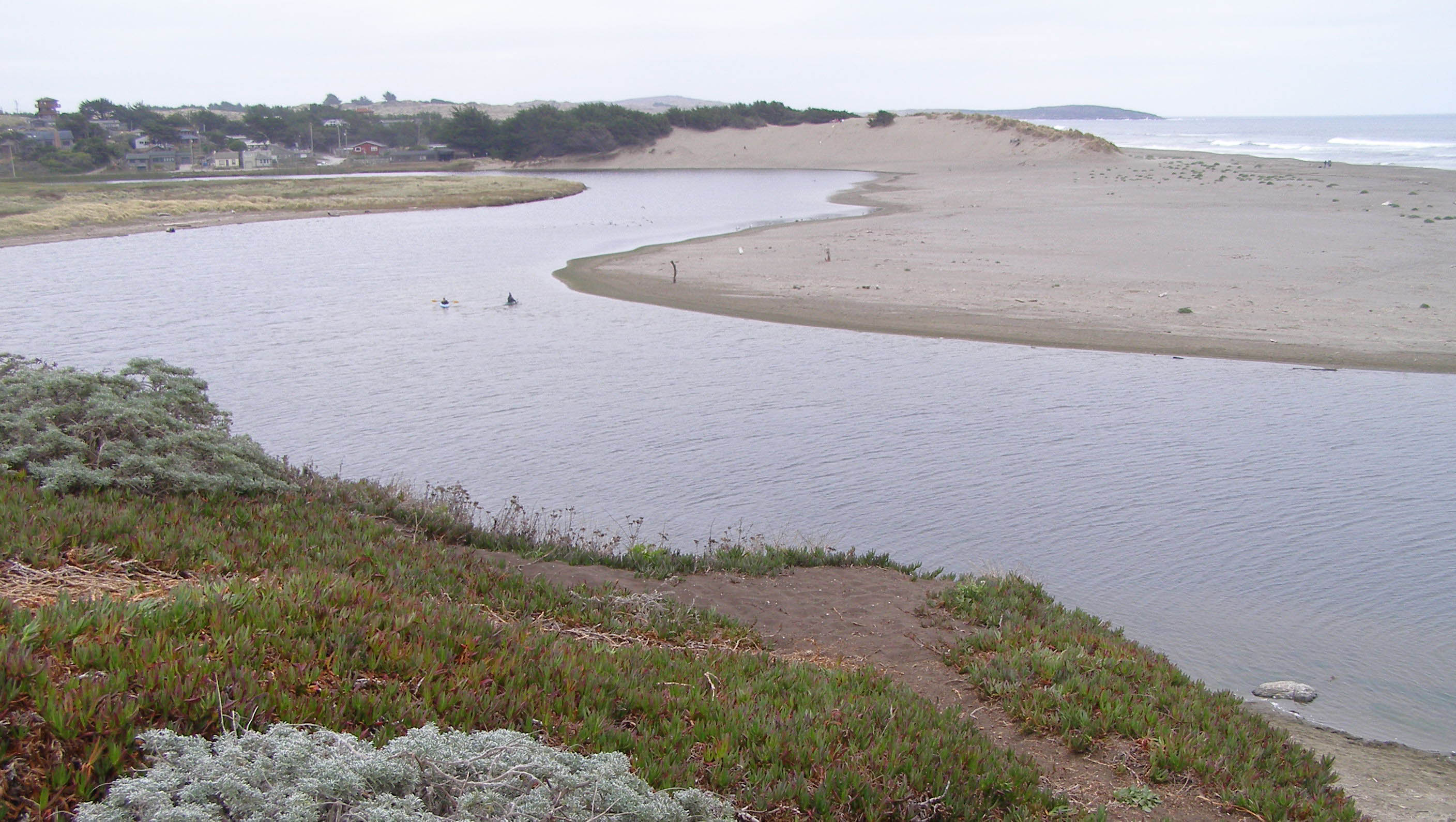
Mouth of Salmon Creek, looking south with Bodega Dunes to the South.

The Russian River, with its mouth at the north end of Goat Rock Beach, is Sonoma County's largest watercourse, both in flow rate and lineal extent. Immediately beyond the Russian River discharge to the Pacific Ocean is the coastal town of Jenner. North of the mouth of the Russian River is Jenner Beach. Goat Rock protrudes into the Pacific at the south end of Goat Rock Beach. Visitors can access the base of Goat Rock via a low lying isthmus of land which has been appropriated by the State as a parking area. The almost sheer cliffs of Goat Rock are virtually impossible to scale or to circumnavigate; in fact, signage is posted prohibiting either activity. There is considerable sloughing of broken rock from these vertical surfaces of Goat Rock. Blind Beach is situated immediately south of Goat Rock Beach, the two beaches being separated by Goat Rock itself.

Along Goat Rock Beach and the adjoining beaches, massive rock outcroppings are found both on the shore and protruding from the Pacific Ocean as small skerries. Among these rugged structures are natural arches formed by powerful wave action selectively eroding weaker strata of the rock formations. Approximately 17 mi (27 km) to the south is another major geological feature of the Northern California coast known as Bodega Head. Goat Beach lies below and slightly west of State Route 1.

During the summer months, a sandbar is built up along the beach and separates the Russian River from the Pacific Ocean. This sandbar is breached whenever the water levels reach heights between 4.5–7 feet (1.4–2.1 m) at the Jenner visitor center. Breaching of the sandbar during late fall/early winter splits the beach in two sections. The northern section is protected by the Russian River flowing into the ocean and creates an ideal location for harbor seal pupping.

The Russian River State Marine Reserve and Russian River State Marine Conservation Area protect the Russian River Estuary. Like underwater parks, these marine protected areas help conserve ocean and freshwater wildlife and marine ecosystems.

== Geology ==
Goat Rock Beach is subject to continuing marine erosion as well as windborne erosion, thus creating a situation where an average of 1 to 3 ft (0.30 to 0.91 m) per year of land mass is lost, except for the hardest of outcrop formations. In winters of heavy storms, this value can be yet higher. Over the last geologic epoch the land has been subject to uplift, a process combined with marine erosion, which has created a marine terrace above the entire extent of the beach. This marine terrace elevation varies approximately 30–150 feet (9.1–45.7 m) above mean sea level, which results in a steep bluff directly above the littoral zone, and a succession of terrace levels.

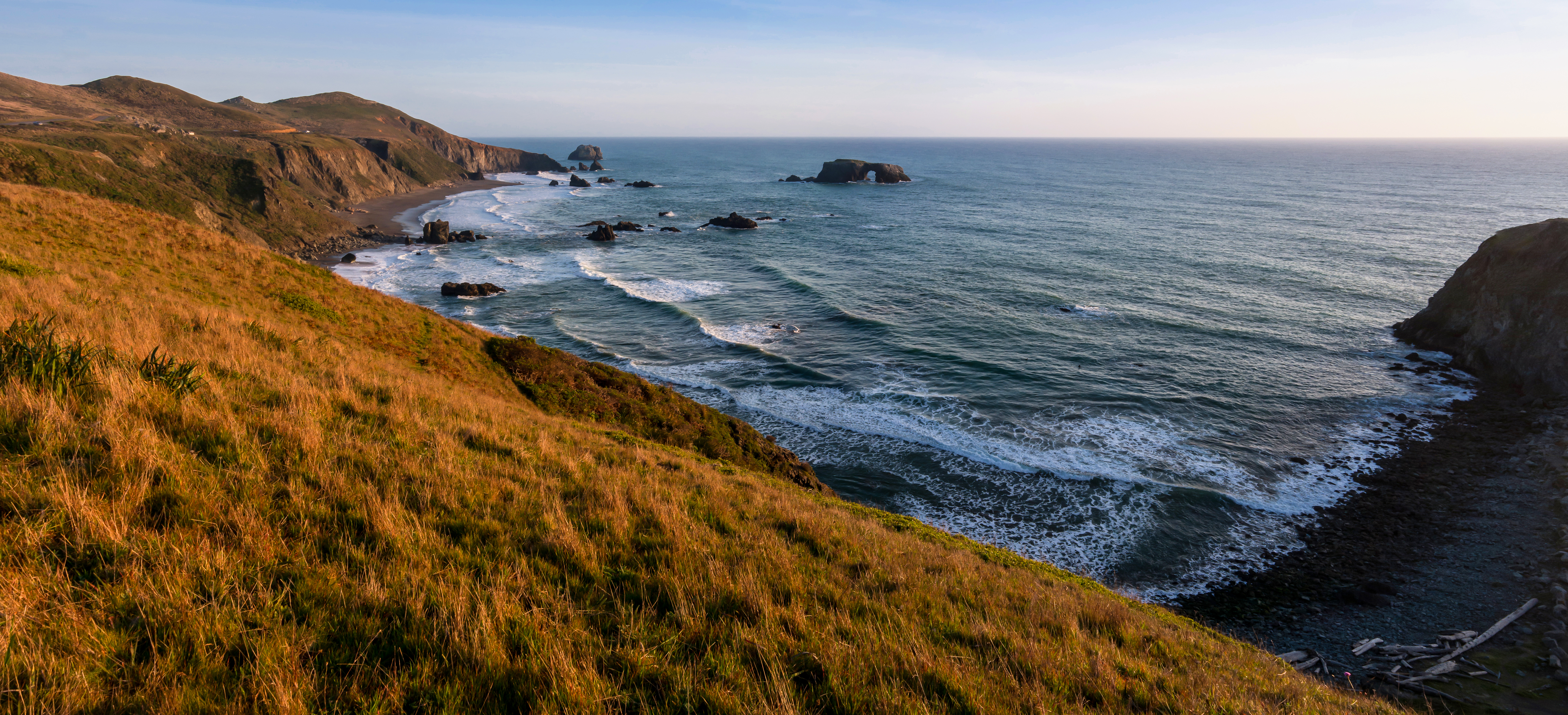
Arched Rock, as seen from Goat Rock Beach.

The sea stacks along the coast at Goat Rock Beach consist of rocks from the Franciscan Complex, formed within an era of plate collision along the western coast of North America. From about 200 to 30 million years ago, the North American Plate was in continual collision with the Farallon Plate. A variety of rock types resulted from this collision, including pillow basalt, chert, and marine sandstone. During the plate collisions, these rocks were considerably faulted and crushed into melange, which is a mixture of ground-up matrix and resistant pockets of rock floating within. When melange is eroded by wave action, the softer part of the matrix is washed away, leaving the more resistant blocks exposed in the ocean as sea stacks. Goat Rock is such a flat topped sea stack consisting of a block of resistant greywacke.

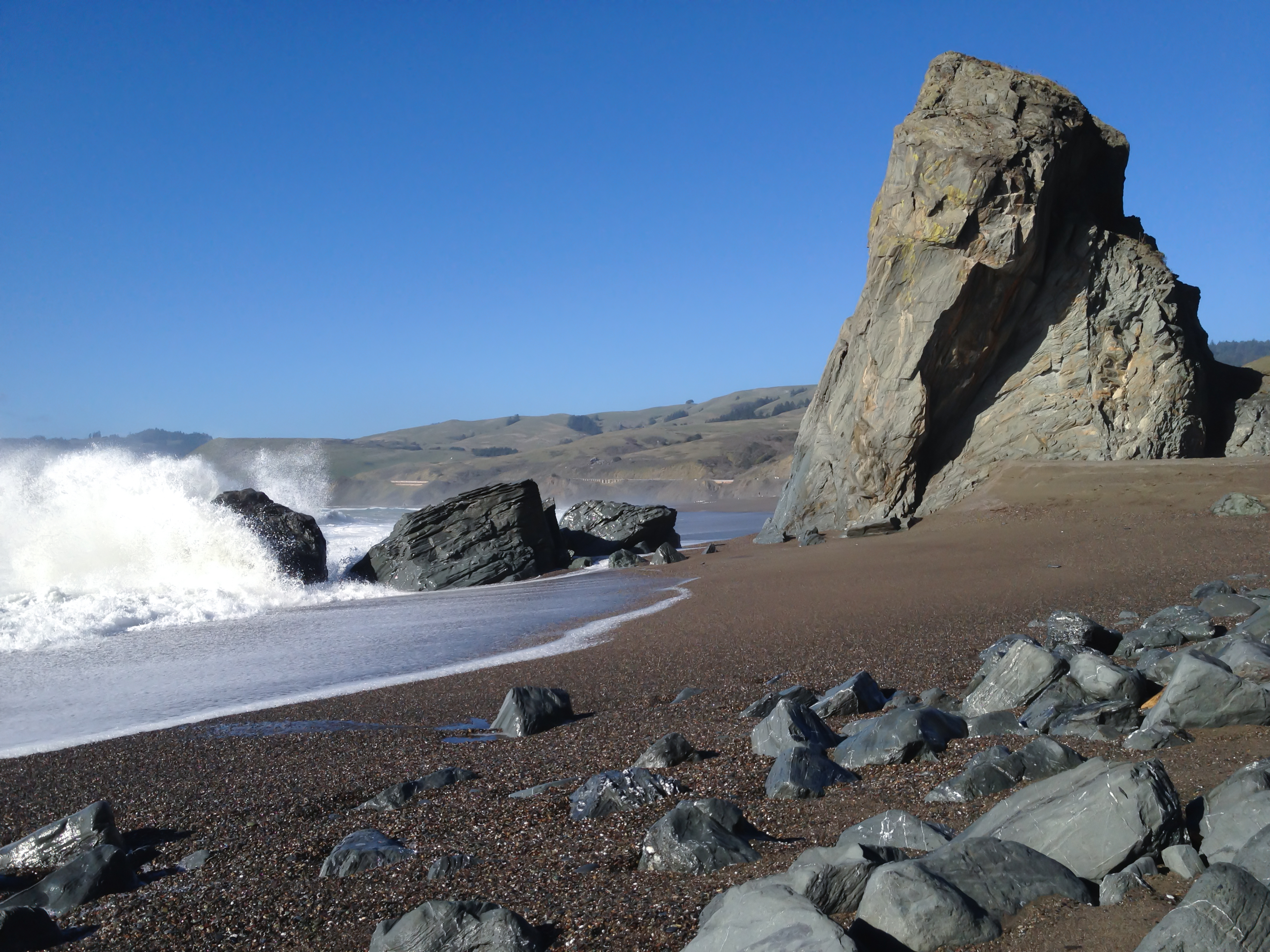
Rock formation on Goat Rock Beach

Vertical sea stack formations, a geological hallmark of this shoreline, appear standing out of the water or on the beach resembling sculptures. Occasionally these stacks appear on the marine terrace, indicating their ancient genesis on the sea floor prior to uplift. These rock formations are characteristically composed of sandstone with layers of quartz.

The active San Andreas Fault runs roughly parallel and near to the coastline of Goat Rock Beach. Soils within the site are classified as coastal beach sands (where rocky shoreline is not evident) and escarpment group soils on the marine terrace; typically soils above the marine terrace are in the Rohnerville loam group. Most of the beach sands consist of a medium coarse brown to gray sandy materials, reflecting the high rate of erosion of escarpment soils into the ocean; however, there are patches of dark gray smooth pebble beach such as the approximately 100 metres (328 ft) stretch lying immediately north of Goat Rock. The beach is changed every year.

== Area history ==
The oldest natural history of this area related to mammals manifests in a series of rock outcrops about one third of a mile south of Goat Rock Beach, positioned above the shoreline on a low lying marine terrace. There are uplifted sea stack formations with prominent rubbing marks about 2 to 4 metres (6 ft 7 in to 13 ft 1 in) in elevation above the ground surface, a height too high to have been caused by modern bovids. Mammoths are believed to have roamed here as recently as 40,000 years ago, and they are thought to have created these severe rubbing marks. Mammoth fossil remains have been found at Bodega Head at the south end of Sonoma Coast State Beach.

The earliest known human settlement of this site was by the Native American Coast Miwok and Pomo tribes. As early as 1849 archaeological discoveries were recorded in the vicinity, and to date several prehistoric kitchen middens and other types of tribal habitation finds have been made. Goat Rock Beach is part of the Mexican land grant rancho Bodega. The Russians are thought to have begun logging the old-growth forests directly above the coastal prairie in the early 19th century.

The underwater delineation of the property is considered to extend to 1,000 feet (305 m) from the shoreline. While no shipwrecks have been discovered, the literature indicates that there are at least 17 vessels which may have been lost in these waters. There are remains of numerous historic barns and other agricultural buildings on the coastal prairie several miles south of Goat Rock Beach, indicating 19th century settlement by Europeans; to the south, at Duncans Landing there are iron pins embedded in the sandstone bluffs as evidence of an active shipping industry here in the late 19th and early 20th century.

In the era circa 1920, a sizeable quarrying was conducted at Goat Rock, which activity produced the apparent separation of Goat Rock from the mainland. Quarry products were transported to the mouth of the Russian River via a now abandoned rail line; some of these materials were used to attempt the construction of a jetty in the mouth area, but that project was eventually terminated.

== Flora and fauna ==
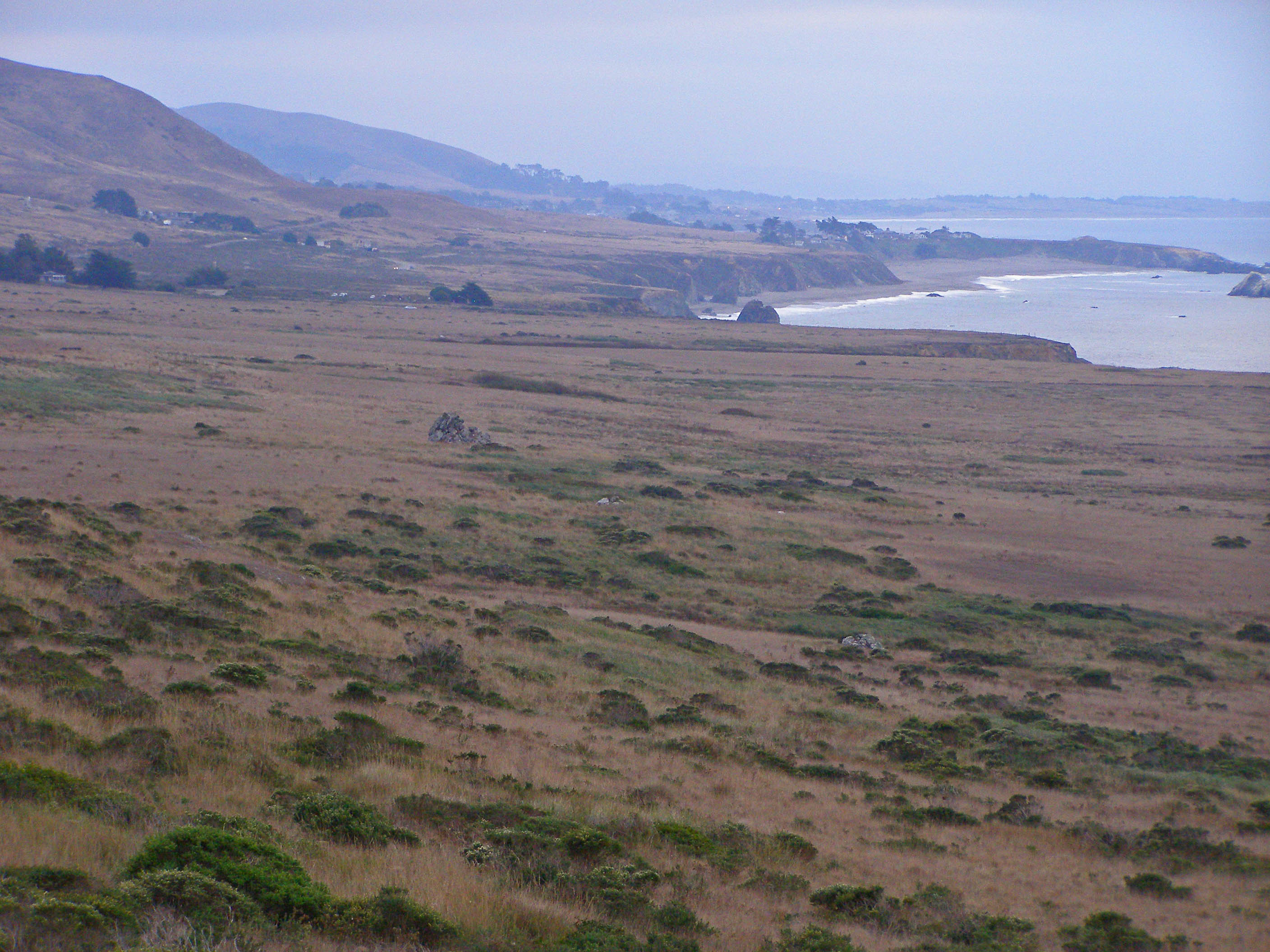
The coastal prairie above Goat Rock Beach supports a diversity of upland species.

There are three distinct habitats present at Goat Rock Beach, including marine, littoral zone and coastal prairie. The marine environment presents gray whales, harbor seals, and California sea lions, as well as a multitude of fish species and other marine organisms; in fact, several species of anadromous fish enter the Russian River estuary and migrate for tens of miles up the Laguna de Santa Rosa and other Russian River tributaries. Furthermore, a variety of pelagic birds and shorebirds are locally in evidence. Additionally, there are modest kelp beds and other marine vegetation. The littoral beach environment has fewer organisms than more southerly zones of California, because of the colder temperatures here.

The coastal prairie soils on the marine terrace above the beach are moderately well drained and granular with moderate soil permeability; these features manifest high erosion potential and moderately high bio-productivity. Acidity of these loamy soils is medium to high, and thus some vegetative stunting and hospitality to rare plants is offered; however, the tree stunting is not as pronounced as farther north along the Mendocino coast, which presents extensive and exaggerated pygmy forests. The upland environment on the coastal prairie offers a range of grass species and wildflowers including varieties of lupine, thistle and wild oats. The typical annual plant productivity is approximately 1,500 kilograms (3,307 lb) per acre of air dried yield per annum in an abundant moisture year, and about half that amount in a very dry year. A variety of birds and mammals thrive on the coastal prairie including numerous California Mule Deer, Odocoileus hemionus californicus.

== Rules and facilities ==
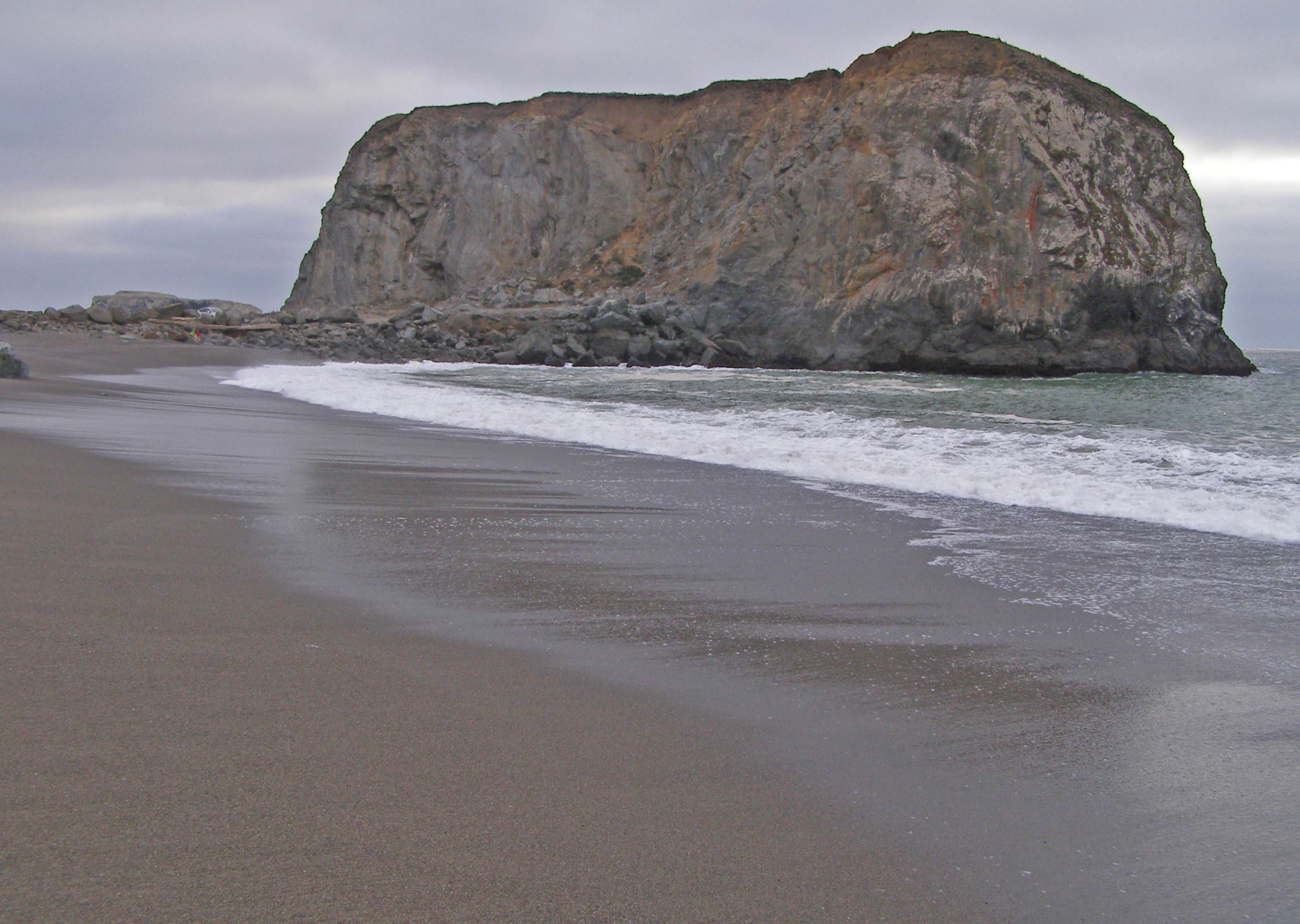
Goat Rock, looking south across Goat Rock Beach

Due to the potential safety risks of strong rip currents and sneaker waves at Goat Rock Beach, swimming is strictly prohibited. There are restroom facilities, a parking lot, and picnic tables on site. Hang-gliding is permitted from a 150 feet (46 m) high launch point on a high marine terrace above the southern part of Goat Rock Beach, provided the participant is in possession of USHGA card, Sonoma Wings card, and signed waiver card.

== Popular culture ==
- The naming of Goat Rock is disputed, but many accounts indicate some goatherds circa early 20th century used the flat grassy top of the formation for grazing goats, since few other species could scale the steep slopes.
- Goat Rock Beach polled as the second most popular beach venue in Sonoma County with readers of Metroactive.
- A group of boulders known as Sunset Boulders near the entrance road is popular with local climbers. Many top rope and bouldering problems exist, ranging from 5.2 to V10.
- Goat Rock Beach, looking towards Arched Rock, was used to portray Cauldron Point in the final scene of the 1985 cult movie The Goonies, with the Inferno, the ship of "One-Eyed Willy" seen in the distance, sailing away.

== See also ==
- Duncans Point
- Salt Point
- List of beaches in Sonoma County, California
- List of California state parks
- List of Sonoma County Regional Parks facilities
