= Bodega Head State Marine Reserve & Bodega Head State Marine Conservation Area =

Protected marine areas in California

Bodega Head State Marine Reserve (SMR) and Bodega Head State Marine Conservation Area (SMCA) are two adjoining marine protected areas off Bodega Bay in Sonoma County on California’s north-central coast. The combined area of these marine protected areas is 21.64 square miles (56.0 km^{2}), with 9.3 square miles (24 km^{2}) in the SMR, and 12.34 square miles (32.0 km^{2}) in the SMCA. Bodega Head SMR prohibits the take of all living marine resources. Bodega Head SMCA prohibits the take of all living marine resources, except the recreational and commercial take of pelagic finfish with troll fishing gear or seine, Dungeness crab by trap, and market squid by hand-held dip net and round haul net.

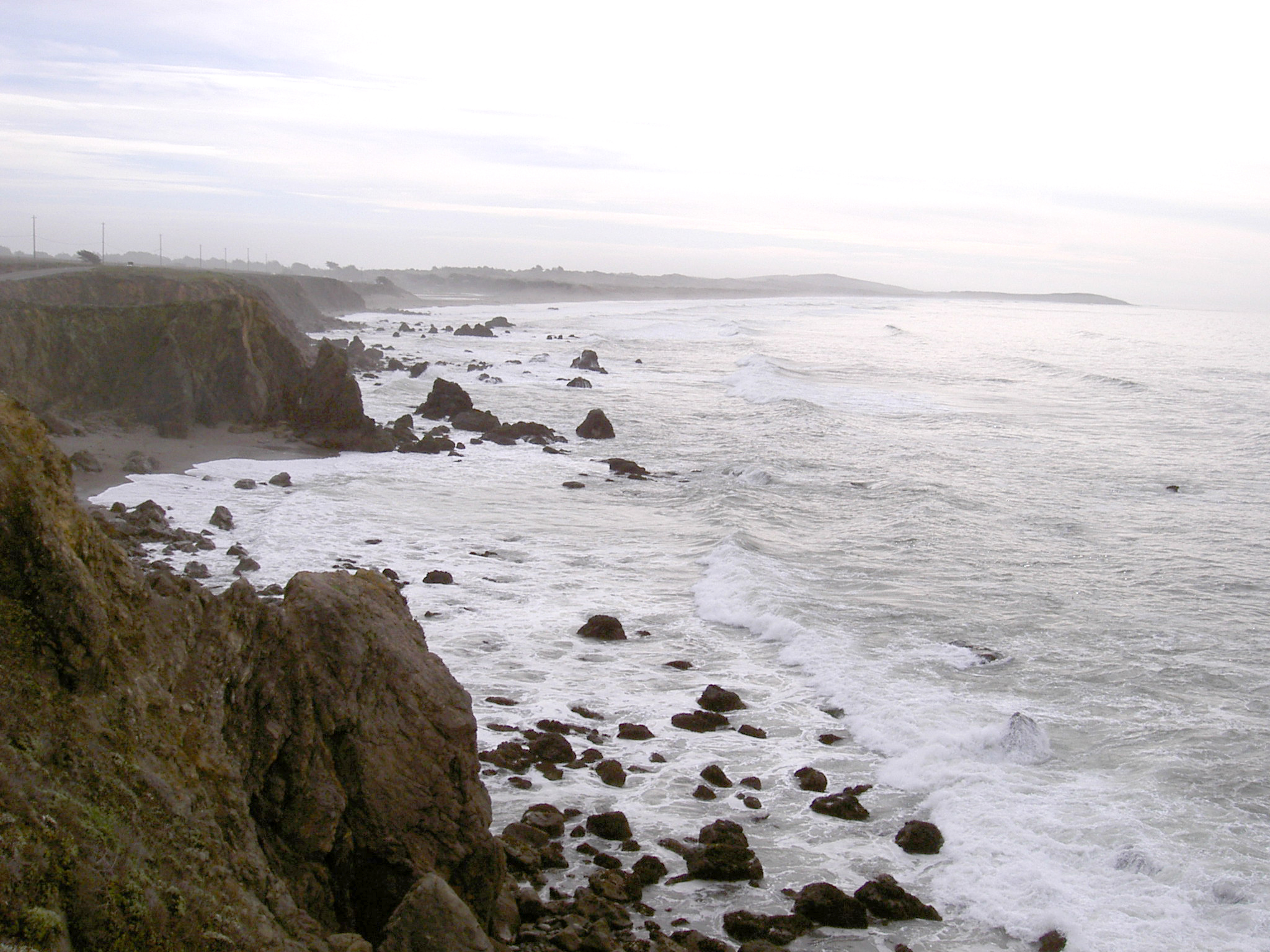
Looking south towards Bodega Head

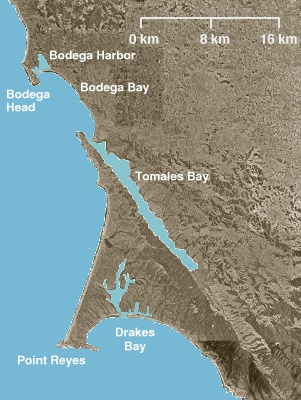

== History ==
Bodega Head SMR and Bodega Head SMCA are two of 22 marine protected areas adopted by the California Department of Fish and Game in August 2009, during the second phase of the Marine Life Protection Act Initiative. The MLPAI is a collaborative public process to create a statewide network of protected areas along California’s coastline.

The north-central coast’s new marine protected areas were designed by local divers, fishermen, conservationists, and scientists who comprised the North Central Coast Regional Stakeholder Group. Their job was to design a network of protected areas that would preserve sensitive sea life and habitats while enhancing recreation, study, and education opportunities.

The north-central coast marine protected areas took effect on May 1, 2010.

== Geography and natural features ==
Bodega Head SMR and Bodega Head SMCA are two adjoining marine protected areas off Bodega Bay in Sonoma County on California’s north-central coast. Bodega Head is a rocky peninsula that shelters Bodega Bay, an inlet and small town in Sonoma County. The 13-mile (21 km) long Sonoma Coast State Beach begins at Bodega Head and stretches north to the Russian River.

Bodega Head SMR is bounded by the mean high tide line and straight lines connecting the following points in the order listed except where noted:

- 38°20.10′N 123°04.04′W
- 38°20.10′N 123°08.38′W thence southward along the three nautical mile offshore boundary to
- 38°18.00′N 123°08.08′W and
- 38°18.00′N 123°03.64′W.

Bodega Head SMCA is bounded by the mean high tide line and straight lines connecting the following points in the order listed except where noted:

- 38°18.00′N 123°03.64′W
- 38°18.00′N 123°08.08′W thence southward along the three nautical mile offshore boundary to
- 38°13.34′N 123°03.51′W and
- 38°17.93′N 123°03.51′W.

== Habitat and wildlife ==
The Bodega Head area contains one of the most persistent and important upwelling plumes along the entire California coast and provides for significant downstream larval dispersal, resulting in an area of high abundance and natural diversity. The area provides important habitat for nearshore, shelf, and deeper nearshore rockfishes such as lingcod, kelp greenling, and cabezon, as well as a diversity of benthic invertebrates. Murres, auklets, guillemots, and marine mammals also depend on the habitat and forage fishes found here.

== Recreation and nearby attractions ==
Sonoma Coast State Beach is a series of beaches that extends 13 miles (21 km) from Bodega Bay to the Russian River. There are more than a dozen access points to Sonoma Coast State Beach along State Highway 1, and the Sonoma Coast Trail connects a number of beaches otherwise hidden by rocky coves and tall bluffs. Beachcombing, fishing and picnicking are common activities. During spring, blue lupine and Indian paintbrush are common. Sonoma Coast State Park has four campgrounds that include developed and primitive sites.

Doran Regional Park, one mile (1.6 km) south of Bodega Bay, provides a boat launch and campgrounds, while Salmon Creek Beach to the north is the most visited surf spot in Sonoma County.

Bodega Head SMR prohibits the take of all living marine resources. Bodega Head SMCA prohibits the take of all living marine resources, except the recreational and commercial take of pelagic finfish with troll fishing gear or seine, Dungeness crab by trap, and market squid by hand-held dip net and round haul net. However, California’s marine protected areas encourage recreational and educational uses of the ocean. Activities such as kayaking, diving, snorkeling, and swimming are allowed unless otherwise restricted.

== Scientific monitoring ==
As specified by the Marine Life Protection Act, select marine protected areas along California’s central coast are being monitored by scientists to track their effectiveness and learn more about ocean health. Similar studies in marine protected areas located off of the Santa Barbara Channel Islands have already detected gradual improvements in fish size and number.
