= Murder of Jason Allen and Lindsay Cutshall =

2004 double murder in California, US

- Location of shooting (red map pin) within Sonoma County (shown in green)
- Location: 38.45409°N 123.13353°W; Fish Head Beach, Jenner, California, United States
- Date: August 14, 2004 or August 15, 2004; Overnight (Pacific Time Zone)
- Attack type: Murder
- Weapon: Marlin .45-70 lever-action sawed-off rifle
- Deaths: 2
- Victims: Jason Allen; Lindsay Cutshall
- Perpetrator: Shaun Gallon
- Assailant: 1
- Motive: Mental illness
- Accused: May 14, 2018
- Charges: 2 counts: First-degree murder
- Verdict: July 15, 2019
- Convictions: 3 life terms w/o parole (consecutive) + 94 years
- Convicted: June 13, 2019

Jason Allen and Lindsay Cutshall were murdered on the night of August 14–15, 2004, when the young couple was shot to death as they slept on a state beach in Jenner, California, United States. The bodies of Lindsay Cutshall, 22, and her fiancé Jason S. Allen, 26, were found on Fish Head Beach, between Russian Gulch and the mouth of the Russian River, in the small coastal hamlet of Jenner, California. Both Cutshall and Allen were killed with a .45-caliber Marlin rifle as they slept in their sleeping bags on the beach. The Sonoma County Coroner's Office estimated that the couple was slain on either the night of August 14, 2004 or in the early morning hours of August 15, 2004.

The case has received considerable national attention, but the crime remained unsolved, until news given at a press conference on May 5, 2017, suggesting that authorities had solved the crime. In 2019, Shaun Gallon was sentenced to life in prison for the murders.

== Victims ==
Lindsay Cutshall and Jason Allen grew up in the Midwestern United States. Cutshall was from Fresno, Ohio and Allen was from Zeeland, Michigan. The couple met in 2002 while Cutshall was a student at the Appalachian Bible College in West Virginia, and became engaged six weeks later. They planned to marry in autumn of 2004.

Both Cutshall and Allen were counselors at Rock-N-Water, a Christian summer camp in El Dorado County, California. According to acquaintances, Cutshall and Allen had left the camp on a road trip the day before they were killed. Credit card receipts placed the duo at Fisherman's Wharf in San Francisco on August 14, 2004. Witnesses also reported seeing Cutshall's 1992 red Ford Tempo in the towns of Guerneville, Sebastopol, Forestville, and Jenner before the murders.

On Saturday - the probable night of the murder - it is speculated, but not confirmed, that the couple went to a local motel and restaurant called River's End but were unable to rent a room. They learned about the nearby beach, which is less than a mile from the restaurant. Since camping on the beach is illegal, it is unlikely the couple planned to camp for more than one night.

The bodies of the slain couple were not discovered until Wednesday, August 18, when the Sheriff's helicopter was dispatched following a report of a man who was stranded on a cliff above Fish Head Beach. The helicopter spotted the bodies and notified the department.

== Investigation ==
Homicide detectives from the Sonoma County Sheriff's Department launched an investigation into the deaths. The detectives quickly eliminated murder-suicide as an explanation to the killings. They also confirmed that none of Cutshall's or Allen's belongings had been taken, ruling out robbery as a motive, and that neither of them had been sexually assaulted.

Camping is prohibited on the rural stretch of beach where Cutshall and Allen met their deaths, but drifters and hitchhikers on State Route 1 (which runs alongside Fish Head Beach) are known to use the oceanfront site for sleeping. Initially, it was postulated that a drifter had murdered the young couple and then left the area. Despite an exhaustive effort by detectives, this avenue of the investigation never yielded any solid leads.

The weapon that was used was a .45-caliber Marlin Model 1894 long rifle, either a long colt style, or a carbine magazine. Although ballistics determined the gun type, police declined to publicly disclose it, in order "to eliminate false leads." The rifle is uncommon, considered too high caliber for most ranchers, and most likely would have required hand loaded ammunition. Shell casings were not found at the scene of the crime, suggesting the killer retrieved them.

On July 16, 2009, a 62-year-old drifter named Joseph Henry Burgess was killed in a shoot-out in the remote of Jemez Mountains of New Mexico. Initially believed to be a suspect, Burgess's DNA was tested, and did not match that left at the Jenner crime scene.

=== 2006 evidence ===
In May 2006, 21 months after Cutshall and Allen were slain, Sonoma County Sheriff's detectives released new evidence in the case, which they hoped would generate new leads. New evidence included poems found near the crime scene, writings contained in a journal left for visitors inside a nearby driftwood hut, an empty 40-ounce bottle of Camo beer, and drawings inked onto pieces of driftwood near the site of the killings. Camo beer originates in Wisconsin, is no longer made, and is an uncommon beer in California. They also found a distinctive hat on a turnout above the beach on Hwy 1. Police wanted to know how the hat and beer bottle came to be in the places they were found.

The case remained unsolved at that time. The Sonoma County Sheriff's department offered a $50,000 reward for information.

=== 2017 police press conference ===
The Sonoma County Sheriff's Office held a press conference on Friday, May 5, 2017, regarding major developments in the 2004 Jenner double murder case. The press conference was held at the Sheriff's Office building at 2796 Ventura Avenue in Santa Rosa. Attendees had been instructed to arrive by 10:15 AM. No additional information was provided until the press conference.

At 10:30 AM on May 5, 2017, Sonoma County Sheriff Steve Freitas read the following statement regarding the 2004 Jenner double murder case:

"Good morning ladies and gentlemen. I'm Steve Freitas, the Sheriff here in Sonoma County. I'd like to make a brief statement and then I will take some questions.

I'm pleased to announce that the Sheriff's Office has made a major break-thru in the investigation surrounding the murders of Jason Allen and Lindsay Cutshall that took place in August, 2004 in Jenner.

Many of us will never forget when Sonoma County was rocked by the discovery of a young innocent couple found murdered on a secluded beach where they spent the night. Jason and Lindsay were just 26 and 22 years old at the time of their deaths. Jason, from Michigan, and Lindsay, from Ohio, were in California working at a Christian youth white water rafting camp in El Dorado County and were on a three day sight-seeing trip of the Northern California coast.

The Sheriff's Office has identified Shaun Gallon, a 38 year old resident of Forestville, California, as Jason and Lindsay's killer. Gallon was recently arrested for the murder of his brother in their Forestville home. Gallon is well known to Sheriff's Office Investigators, and early on in the Jenner murder investigation Gallon was a person of interest who detectives never ruled out as a possible suspect.

Upon Gallon's arrest for the murder of his brother, Sheriff's Office Detectives took another opportunity to talk to him about the murders in Jenner. Gallon made statements to the detectives with new information (he spontaneously confessed) and additional investigative leads into the case. He had information about the killings that no other person could have known and we have located evidence that corroborates his information. Based on what detectives have been able to learn, we feel confident that we have Jason and Lindsay's killer in custody.

Sheriff's Office detectives are continuing to follow-up on leads and are working hard to complete the investigation. We will be presenting our report to the District Attorney's Office in the near future. However, we are still encouraging anyone with information about this case and/or Shaun Gallon to contact our detectives. For that reason, we are releasing a photo of Shaun Gallon. Sergeant Crum has that picture for those who want it and it will be posted at the end of this press conference.

I'd like to a take moment to thank the other law enforcement agencies who assisted on this investigation over the years: The Santa Rosa Police Department, Federal Bureau of Investigation, Alcohol Tobacco and Firearms, California State Parks and the California Department of Justice. Additionally, I want to thank the members of our community who have come forward with information on this case.

I also want to thank the many men and women of the Sheriff's Office who have worked on this investigation over the years. I'm grateful to the dozens of detectives, from all of the Sheriff's Office investigative units, who persistently and faithfully worked on this case for nearly 13 years. I wish I could name them all, but there are too many to list. I would like to acknowledge and thank the current investigative team: Lieutenant Tim Duke, Sgt. Shannon McAlvain, Lead Detective Joe Horsemen, Detectives Jeff Toney, Jayson Fowler and Jesse Hanshew.

This case is further proof that the men and women of the Sheriff's Office will never give up in protecting our community and seeking justice for crime victims.

Most importantly I want to thank the Cutshall and Allen families, who have consistently been supportive and patient during this 13 year investigation. I'd like to read a statement from Bob and Delores Allen and Chris and Kathy Cutshall:

"We are extremely pleased that our children's murderer is in custody where he belongs. We praise the Lord for his capture and we trust in the due process of the law. We would like to thank the heartfelt concern of the people of Jenner and Sonoma County. We have appreciated your support for this case throughout our thirteen-year ordeal.

We are especially grateful to the Sonoma County Sheriff's Office for their tireless pursuit of Jason's and Lindsay's killer. The strong support for us and for the case by the former sheriff, Sheriff Cogbill, and the current sheriff, Sheriff Freitas, has been outstanding. And the dedication of all the lieutenants, sergeants, detectives, and support personnel of Sheriff's Office Investigations throughout the years has totally amazed us. The combination of their humanity and professionalism would not allow them to give up on this case. And when we at times wondered if this day would ever come, the detectives in particular wouldn't allow us to lose hope. To all who have worked this case over the years, we can't thank you enough . You are true heroes to us and we thank God for you. Finally and most importantly, we want to thank our Lord and Savior Jesus Christ for sustaining us and our families throughout this long journey. We know that we have miles to go before the case is closed with a conviction, but we also know the power and wonder of God's grace.

Our prayers continue to be for the Sheriff's Office as they build their case, for the families of the deputies, who have given them their undying support, for all the dear folks of Sonoma County who have prayed for us, and even for Shaun Gallon who heartlessly committed this senseless and wicked crime. Thank you."

I will now take some questions...and while I want to be as transparent as possible, please understand that I don't want to jeopardize the continued investigation and prosecution of this case, so I will not be answering any questions that might disclose information that should be saved for the courtroom."

With this statement, police believe that they have identified the perpetrator of the double homicide as 38-year-old Shaun Gallon, a resident of Forestville, California. Gallon had previously been arrested for the shooting death of his brother Shamus at their mother's home. Sheriff Steve Freitas of Sonoma County said that Gallon made statements about the crime that only the killer would know (Gallon described where exactly in their bodies he shot the victims), and that his office had also found corroborating evidence tying Gallon to the murders. The nature of this evidence has not been released by the authorities. (Gallon in fact led them to a soda can with the two bullet casings).

Gallon's motive for the killings of the couple and his brother have not yet been ascertained. No known connection to him between Lindsay Cutshall or Jason Allen has been uncovered yet either.

=== Charges and sentencing ===
On May 17, 2018, Gallon was officially charged with the murders. Gallon had a history of criminal misconduct, including attempted murder with a package bomb in June 2004, a conviction for wounding a man with an arrow and allegedly killing his younger brother in March 2017.

In June 2019 Gallon entered no-contest pleas and admitted guilt in the crimes. The following month he was sentenced to serve three consecutive life terms without parole plus another 94 years in state prison for his crimes: the murders of Cutshall and Allen; the 2017 killing of his brother, Shamus Gallon; and an attempted murder in 2004 of a man in Monte Rio.

== See also ==
- List of homicides in California
