= Russian River State Marine Reserve and Russian River State Marine Conservation Area =

Marine protected areas in California

- Location: Sonoma County, California, United States

Russian River State Marine Recreational Management Area (SMRMA) and Russian River State Marine Conservation Area (SMCA) are two adjoining marine protected areas in the Russian River estuary area in Sonoma County, California, on the north-central coast of the state. The combined area of these marine protected areas is 1.21 square miles (3.1 km^{2}), with 0.35 square miles (0.91 km^{2}) in the SMRMA and 0.86 square miles (2.2 km^{2}) in the SMCA.

In the Russian River SMRMA, the taking of all living marine resources except recreational hunting of waterfowl is prohibited, unless otherwise restricted by hunting regulations. In the Russian River SMCA, the taking of all living marine resources is prohibited, except the recreational and commercial trapping of Dungeness crab and the taking of Hypomesus pretiosus (surf smelt) by hand-held dip nets or beach nets.

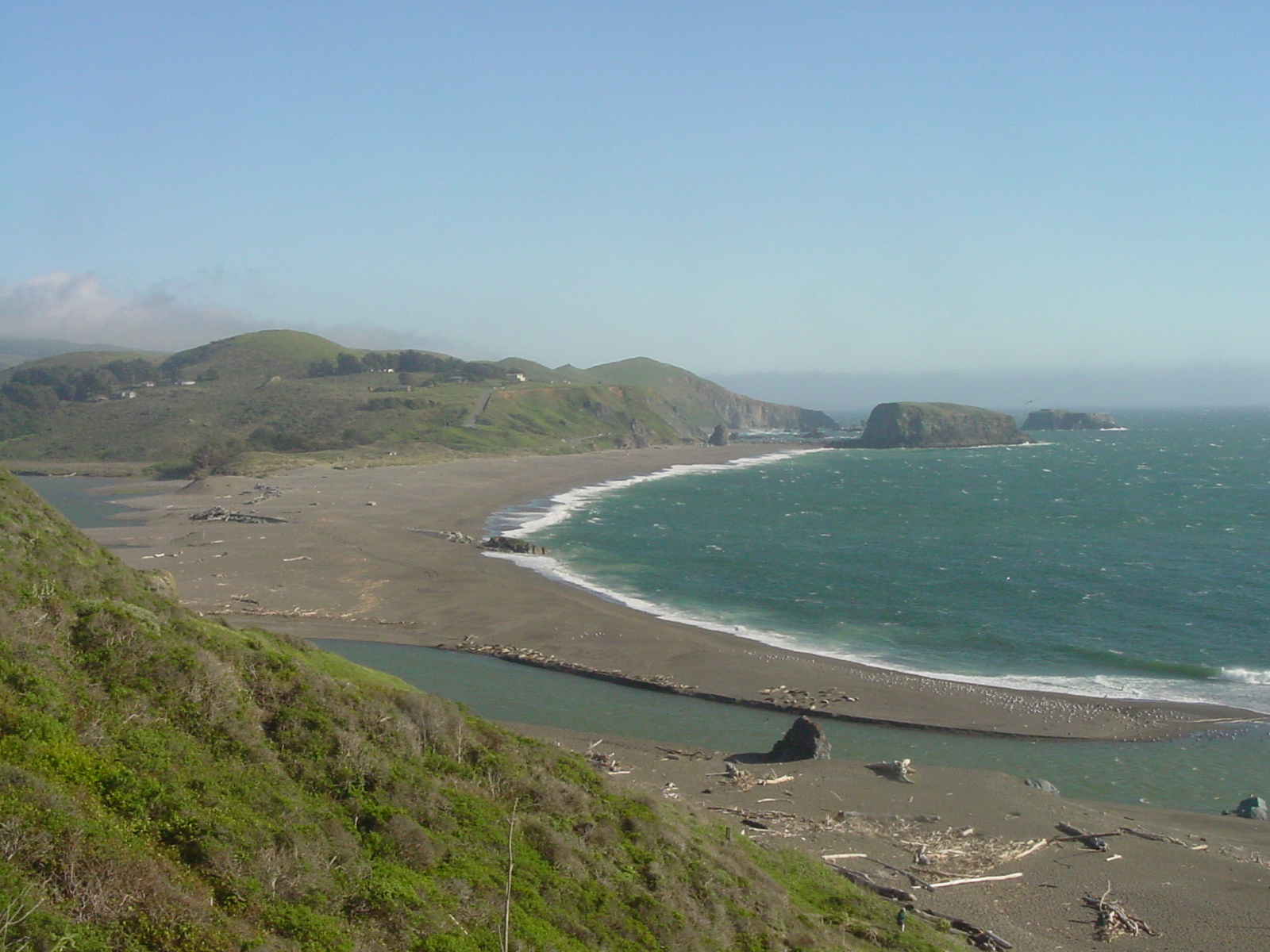
The mouth of the Russian River

== History ==
The areas are two of the 22 marine protected areas adopted by the California Department of Fish and Wildlife in August 2009, during the second phase of the Marine Life Protection Act Initiative. The MLPAI is a collaborative public process to create a statewide network of protected areas along California's coastline.

The north central coast's new marine protected areas were designed by local divers, fishermen, conservationists and scientists who comprised the North Central Coast Regional Stakeholder Group. Their job was to design a network of protected areas that would preserve sensitive sea life and habitats while enhancing recreation, study and education opportunities.

The north central coast marine protected areas took effect May 1, 2010.

== Geography and natural features ==
Russian River SMRMA and Russian River SMCA are two adjoining marine protected areas that protect the Russian River Estuary in Sonoma County on California's north central coast. The Russian River flows through Goat Rock Beach within Sonoma Coast State Beach into the Pacific Ocean. The estuary is closed seasonally by a sandbar.

Russian River SMRMA includes the waters below the mean high tide line eastward of the mouth of the Russian River Estuary defined as a line connecting the following two points:

- 38°27.16′N 123°7.91′W and
- 38°27.01′N 123°7.74′W

and westward of the Highway 1 Bridge.

Russian River SMCA bounded by the mean high tide line, the mouth of the Russian River estuary as defined in subsection 632(b)(14)(A), and straight lines connecting the following points in the order listed:

1. 38°27.38′N 123°8.58′W
2. 38°26.38′N 123°8.58′W and
3. 38°26.38′N 123°7.7′W.

== Habitat and wildlife ==
The Russian River Estuary is an important nursery for crab and salmon and has diverse estuarine habitats such as eelgrass beds and mudflats. The seasonal sandbar provides an important harbor seal haul out and hosts various seabird colonies. The Russian River SMR and SMCA protect steelhead and Russian River chinook and coho salmon, which aggregate at the mouth of the estuary during seasonal sandbar closures.

== Recreation and nearby attractions ==
Sonoma Coast State Beach is a series of beaches that extends 13 miles (21 km) from Bodega Bay to the Russian River. There are more than a dozen access points to Sonoma Coast State Beach along State Highway 1, and the Sonoma Coast Trail connects many of the secret beaches hidden by rocky coves and tall bluffs. Beachcombing, fishing and picnicking are common activities. During spring, flowers like blue lupine and Indian paintbrush are common. Sonoma Coast State Park has four campgrounds that include developed and primitive sites.

Russian River SMRMA prohibits the take of all living marine resources, except recreational hunting of waterfowl, unless otherwise restricted by hunting regulations. Russian River SMCA prohibits take of all living marine resources, except recreational and commercial take of Dungeness crab by trap and take of surf smelt by hand-held dip nets or beach nets. However, California's marine protected areas encourage recreational and educational uses of the ocean. Activities such as kayaking, diving, snorkeling, and swimming are allowed unless otherwise restricted.

== Scientific monitoring ==
As specified by the Marine Life Protection Act, select marine protected areas along California's central coast are being monitored by scientists to track their effectiveness and learn more about ocean health. Similar studies in marine protected areas located off of the Santa Barbara Channel Islands have already detected gradual improvements in fish size and number.
