= Sonoma Coast State Marine Conservation Area =

Protected area in California

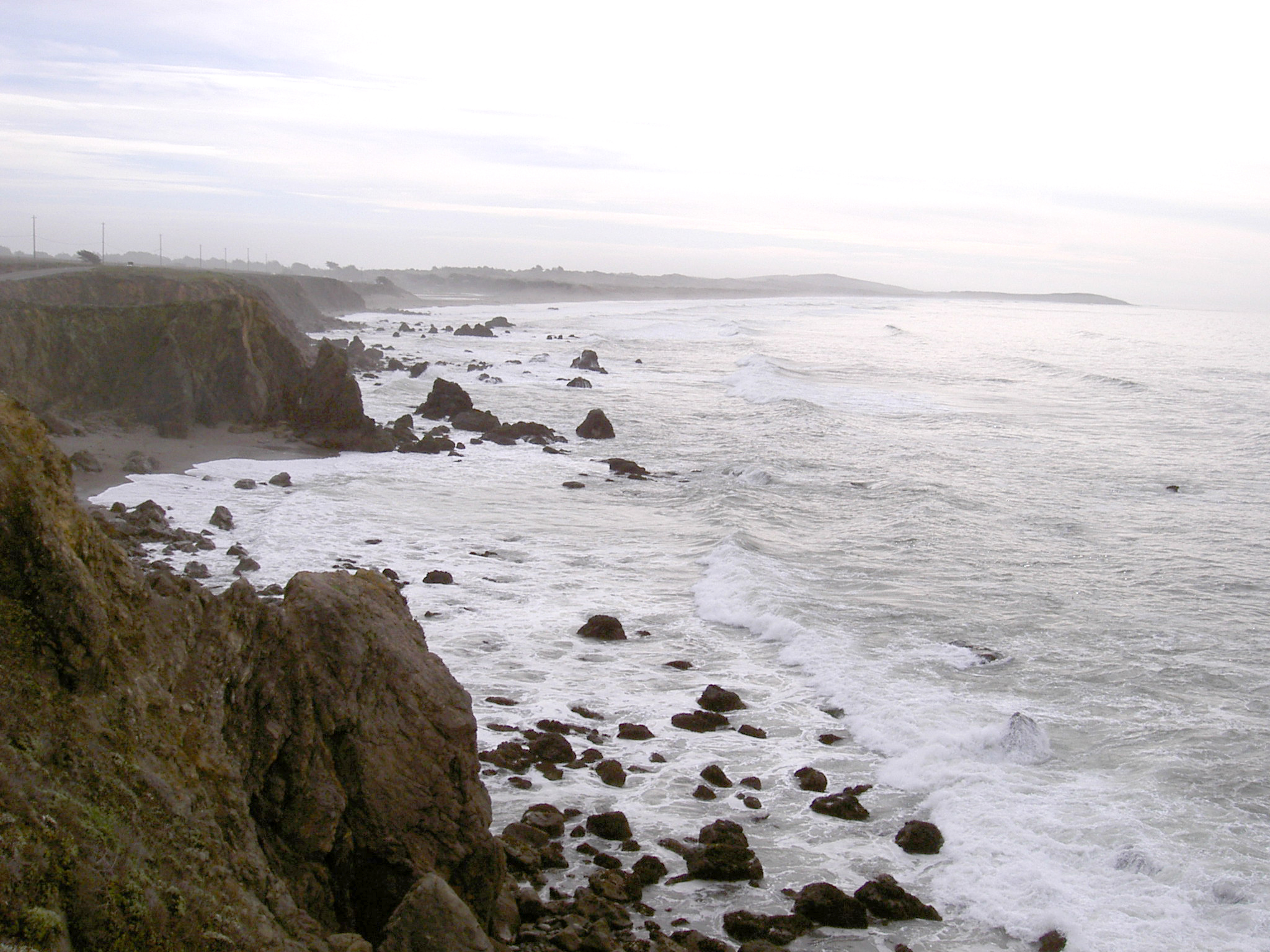
- Interactive map of Sonoma Coast State Marine Conservation Area
- Location: Sonoma County, California
- Nearest city: Bodega Bay, California
- Coordinates: 38.3492°N 123.068°W
- Area: Sonoma Coast

Sonoma Coast State Marine Conservation Area is a protected area along the coast of northern California, part of the North Central Coast Study Region.

It is bounded by the mean high tide line, the 3-fathom depth contour, and several points along 3 miles (4.8 km) of coast between Mussel Point and Schoolhouse Beach in Sonoma County.

Within this Area, the recreational taking of all marine aquatic plants and some invertebrates is prohibited. Commercial taking of giant kelp and bull kelp is also prohibited.

== See also ==
- Sonoma Coast State Park
