= Bodega Head =

Promontory in California, United States

Coordinates: 38°18′40″N 123°03′57″W

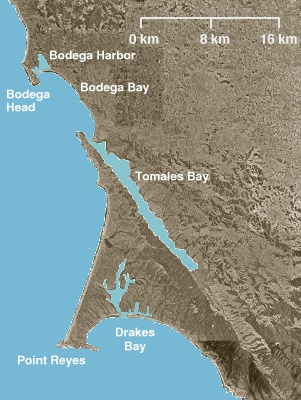
Bodega Head

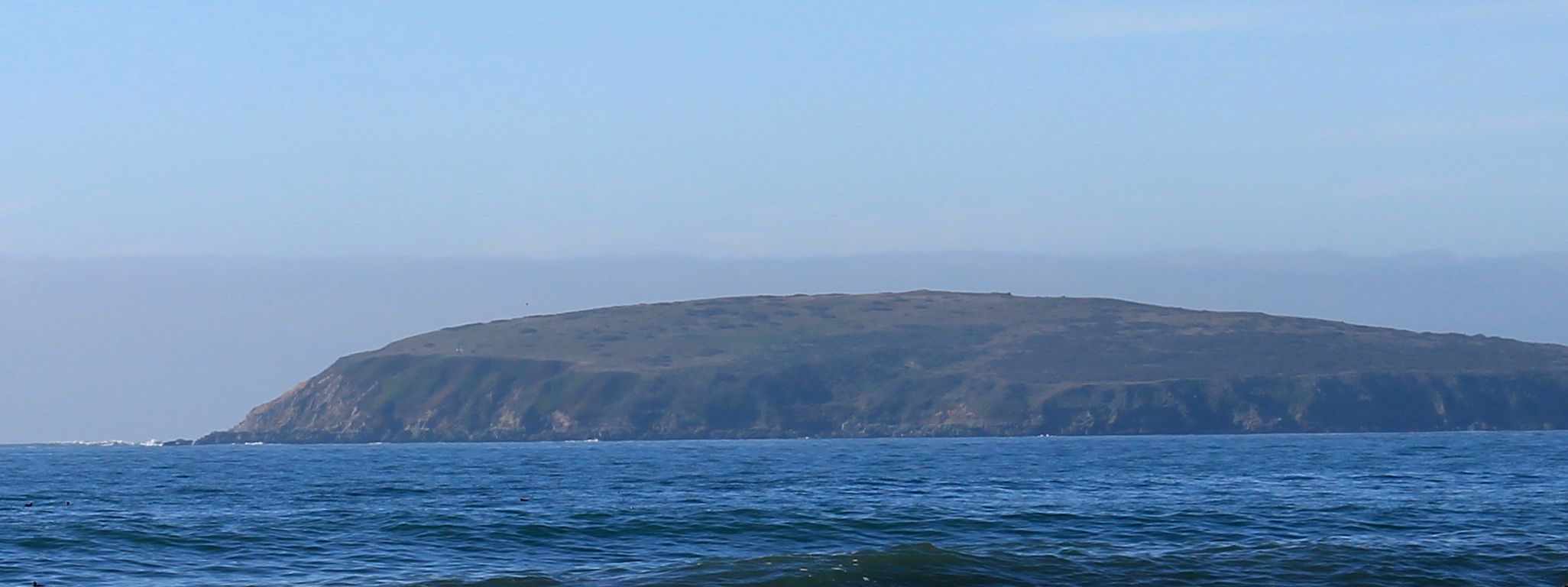
Bodega Head in 2013, seen from Pinnacle Gulch.

Bodega Head is a small promontory on the Pacific coast of northern California in the United States. It is located in Sonoma County, approximately 40 mi (64 km) northwest of San Francisco and approximately 20 mi (32 km) west of Santa Rosa.

The peninsula, which is approximately 4 mi (6.4 km) long and 1 mi (1.6 km) wide, emerges from the coast to the north. It shelters the shallow, sandy Bodega Bay and the inner portion known as Bodega Harbor. Sonoma Coast State Beach comprises beaches and dunes along the south side of the promontory. The University of California, Davis runs an ongoing marine biology program at the Bodega Marine Laboratory. The laboratory is located on the grounds of Bodega Marine Reserve, which is part of the UC Natural Reserve System. The peninsula is considered a prime spot to observe the migration of whales. It is also one of the three points of the Red Triangle, a major feeding ground for great white sharks. A series of trails are a popular destination for recreational hiking.

Bodega Head State Marine Reserve & Bodega Head State Marine Conservation Area protect area waters. Like underwater parks, these marine protected areas help conserve ocean wildlife and marine ecosystems.

The peninsula was probably inhabited by the Coast Miwok people before the arrival of Europeans. Campbell Cove, on the east side of the promontory, is a candidate for Sir Francis Drake's 1579 landing site.

== Geology ==
Bodega Head lies just on the west side of the San Andreas Fault, which runs between the base of the promontory and the mainland. During the 1906 San Francisco earthquake, the promontory shifted approximately 15 ft (4.6 m), displacing the harbor to the north relative to the mainland.

Geologically, the rocks of Bodega Head differ greatly from those on the mainland just to the east. Whereas the rocks of Bodega Head are exposed continental granite, the mainland rocks are of oceanic origin from the Franciscan Complex. Bodega Head is the northern tip of a vast geologic province known as the Salinian Block whose core is of the same origins as the core of the Sierra Nevada Mountains. The block was torn off the continent as the San Andreas Fault came into existence about 20 million years ago, and was transported northward hundreds of miles. Other nearby examples of the Salinian Block are the Point Reyes Peninsula and the Farallon Islands.

A controversial attempt by Pacific Gas & Electric Company to construct a nuclear power plant on the peninsula was thwarted in 1964 due to environmental concerns and the susceptibility of the site to earthquakes.

== See also ==
- Point Reyes
