= Jenner, California =

Jenner
- Census-designated place
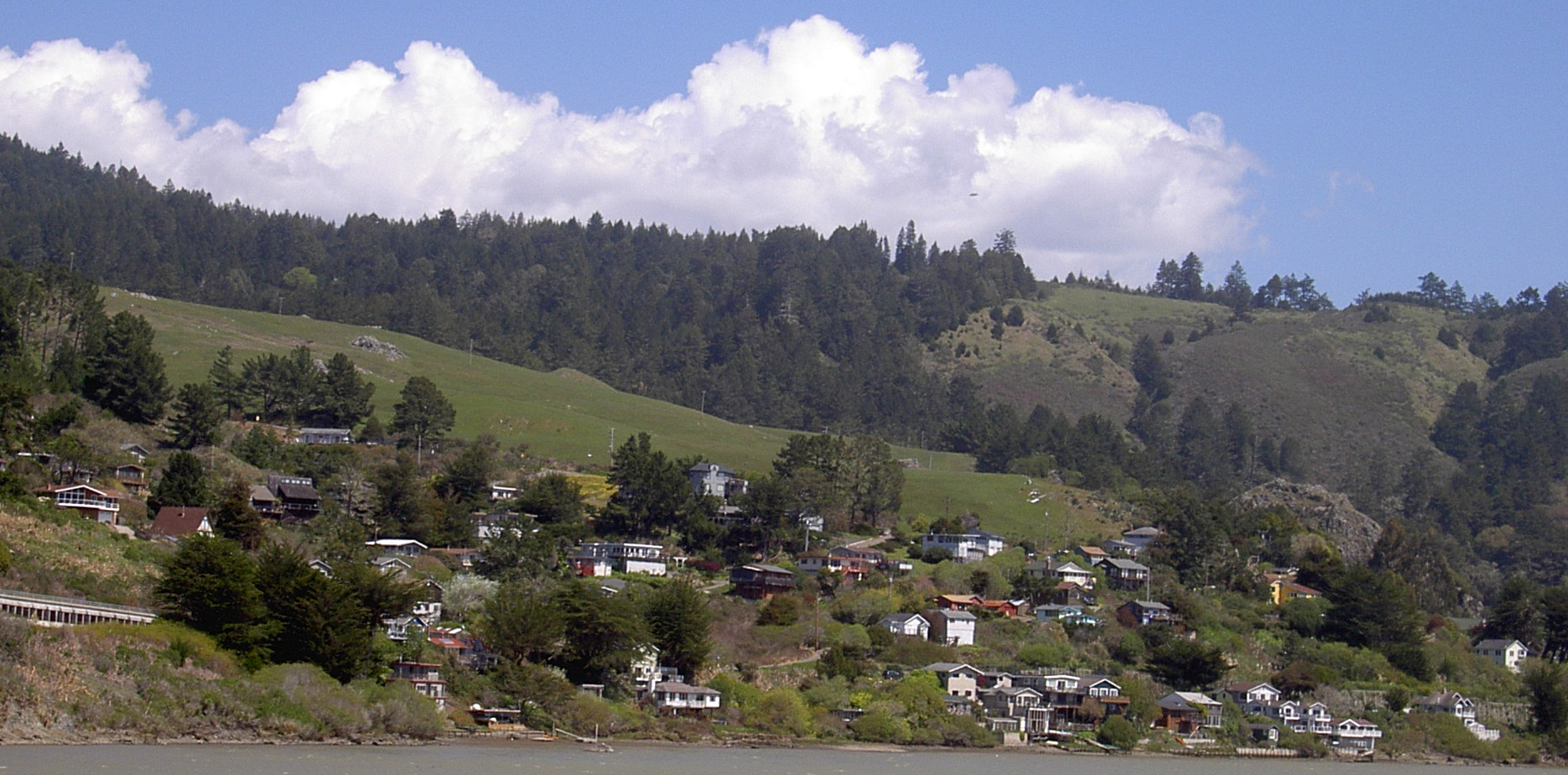

- Location within the state of California
- Coordinates: 38°26′59″N 123°6′56″W
- Country: United States
- State: California
- County: Sonoma

Area
  - Total: 2.397 sq mi (6.209 km^{2})
  - Land: 2.110 sq mi (5.464 km^{2})
  - Water: 0.288 sq mi (0.745 km^{2}) 12.00%
- Elevation: 13 ft (4 m)

Population (2020)
  - Total: 122
  - Density: 57.8/sq mi (22.3/km^{2})
- Time zone: UTC-8 (PST)
  - Summer (DST): UTC-7 (PDT)
- ZIP code: 95450
- Area code: 707
- FIPS code: 06-37274
- GNIS feature ID: 1656100

Jenner, also known as Jenner-by-the-Sea, is a small coastal town and census-designated place (CDP) in Sonoma County, California, United States, with a population of 122 per the 2020 Census. It is located on the Pacific coast near the mouth of the Russian River. State Route 1 runs through the town and State Route 116 runs nearby, along the Russian River. Immediately south of Jenner is Goat Rock Beach, a unit within the Sonoma Coast State Beach. Directly north, the Jenner Headlands Preserve offers scenic overlooks of the Jenner Estuary and surrounding areas.

== History ==
Historically, Jenner was part of the Rancho Muniz. The town's namesake, Dr. Elijah K. Jenner, was a dentist and inventor from Vermont. When his son Charles K. was born in 1846, the family was living in Wisconsin. Elijah came west in 1850 and sought his fortune in the California goldfields. Working as a miner, he designed a pump that could raise water one hundred feet (30 m) high. His patent application included a model pump made of pure gold, which is the only golden model that the Patent Office has ever received.

Jenner's family joined him in 1852. Traveling by ship from the Great Lakes to Panama, it crossed the Isthmus and sailed up the Pacific Coast. By 1854, the Jenners had settled near the mouth of the Russian River and built a house in what became known as Jenner Gulch, the site of the town. Charles K. Jenner would go on to be a prominent attorney in early Seattle, arguing several cases in front of the U.S. Supreme Court.

Stillwater Cove Regional Park, located 16 miles (26 km) north of Jenner, features picnic facilities, beach access, and a historic one-room schoolhouse.

Jenner received media attention in 2004 after the bodies of Lindsay Cutshall and Jason S. Allen were discovered on Fish Head Beach just north of town. The incident became known as the Jenner, California double-murder of 2004.

== Geography ==
According to the United States Census Bureau, the CDP covers an area of 2.4 square miles (6.2 km^{2}), of which 2.1 square miles (5.5 km^{2}) is land, and 0.3 square miles (0.7 km^{2}) is (12.00%) water.

== Demographics ==
Historical population
| Census | Pop. | Note | %± |
|---|---|---|---|
| 2010 | 136 | | — |
| 2020 | 122 | | −10.3% |
U.S. Decennial Census; 1860–1870 1880-1890; 1900 1910 1920; 1930 1940 1950; 1960 1970 1980; 1990 2000 2010; 2020

Jenner first appeared as a census designated place in the 2010 U.S. census.

=== Racial and ethnic composition ===
Jenner CDP, California – Racial and ethnic composition Note: the US Census treats Hispanic/Latino as an ethnic category. This table excludes Latinos from the racial categories and assigns them to a separate category. Hispanics/Latinos may be of any race.
| Race / Ethnicity (NH = Non-Hispanic) | Pop 2010 | Pop 2020 | % 2010 | % 2020 |
|---|---|---|---|---|
| White alone (NH) | 119 | 91 | 87.50% | 74.59% |
| Black or African American alone (NH) | 2 | 1 | 1.47% | 0.82% |
| Native American or Alaska Native alone (NH) | 0 | 0 | 0.00% | 0.00% |
| Asian alone (NH) | 2 | 7 | 1.47% | 5.74% |
| Native Hawaiian or Pacific Islander alone (NH) | 0 | 0 | 0.00% | 0.00% |
| Other race alone (NH) | 0 | 0 | 0.00% | 0.00% |
| Mixed race or Multiracial (NH) | 5 | 9 | 3.68% | 7.38% |
| Hispanic or Latino (any race) | 8 | 14 | 5.88% | 11.48% |
| Total | 136 | 122 | 100.00% | 100.00% |

=== 2020 ===
The 2020 United States census reported that Jenner had a population of 122. The population density was 57.8 inhabitants per square mile (22.3/km^{2}). The racial makeup of Jenner was 94 (77.0%) White, 1 (0.8%) African American, 0 (0.0%) Native American, 7 (5.7%) Asian, 0 (0.0%) Pacific Islander, 2 (1.6%) from other races, and 18 (14.8%) from two or more races. Hispanic or Latino of any race were 14 persons (11.5%).

The whole population lived in households. There were 80 households, out of which 6 (7.5%) had children under the age of 18 living in them, 27 (33.8%) were married-couple households, 6 (7.5%) were cohabiting couple households, 25 (31.3%) had a female householder with no partner present, and 22 (27.5%) had a male householder with no partner present. 29 households (36.2%) were one person, and 18 (22.5%) were one person aged 65 or older. The average household size was 1.52. There were 42 families (52.5% of all households).

The age distribution was 5 people (4.1%) under the age of 18, 1 person (0.8%) aged 18 to 24, 19 people (15.6%) aged 25 to 44, 42 people (34.4%) aged 45 to 64, and 55 people (45.1%) who were 65 years of age or older. The median age was 63.8 years. There were 58 males and 64 females.

There were 161 housing units at an average density of 76.3 units per square mile (29.5 units/km^{2}), of which 80 (49.7%) were occupied. Of these, 63 (78.8%) were owner-occupied, and 17 (21.3%) were occupied by renters.

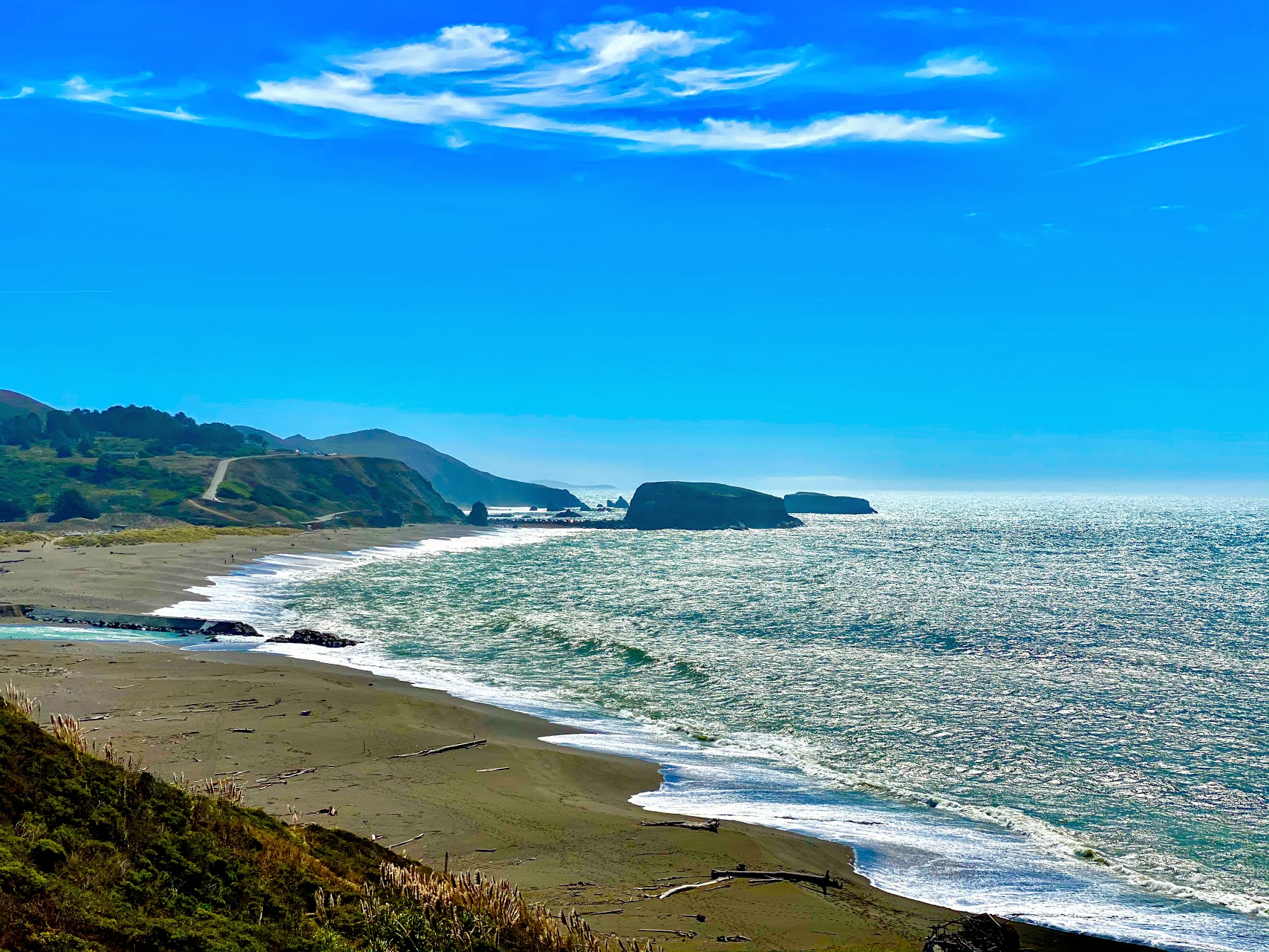
Jenner California

=== Languages ===
As of Census 2000, figures for Jenner's zip code showed that of the primary languages spoken in Jenner 94% spoke English while 6% did not; of those, 2% spoke French, 2% spoke Spanish, 1% spoke German, 1% spoke Urdu, and less than 1% spoke a Native American language.

== Climate ==
Jenner experiences a cool summer Mediterranean climate (Köppen climate classification Csb) typical of coastal areas of California. The wet season, typified by heavy rainfall, is from October to May. Summers are often overcast, the sun blocked by marine layer clouds that keep it cool, humid, and often drizzly in the night and morning hours.

Climate data for Jenner
| Month | Jan | Feb | Mar | Apr | May | Jun | Jul | Aug | Sep | Oct | Nov | Dec | Year |
|---|---|---|---|---|---|---|---|---|---|---|---|---|---|
| Mean daily maximum °F (°C) | 57 (14) | 58 (14) | 59 (15) | 61 (16) | 63 (17) | 65 (18) | 66 (19) | 67 (19) | 68 (20) | 66 (19) | 61 (16) | 57 (14) | 62 (17) |
| Mean daily minimum °F (°C) | 40 (4) | 42 (6) | 42 (6) | 42 (6) | 44 (7) | 46 (8) | 48 (9) | 49 (9) | 48 (9) | 46 (8) | 43 (6) | 40 (4) | 44 (7) |
| Average precipitation inches (mm) | 7.21 (183) | 6.21 (158) | 5.59 (142) | 2.41 (61) | 1.05 (27) | 0.33 (8.4) | 0.14 (3.6) | 0.26 (6.6) | 0.64 (16) | 2.22 (56) | 5.35 (136) | 5.67 (144) | 37.08 (942) |

== Education ==
The school districts are Monte Rio Union Elementary School District and West Sonoma County Union High School District.
