= Estero de San Antonio =

Estero de San Antonio San Antonio Creek
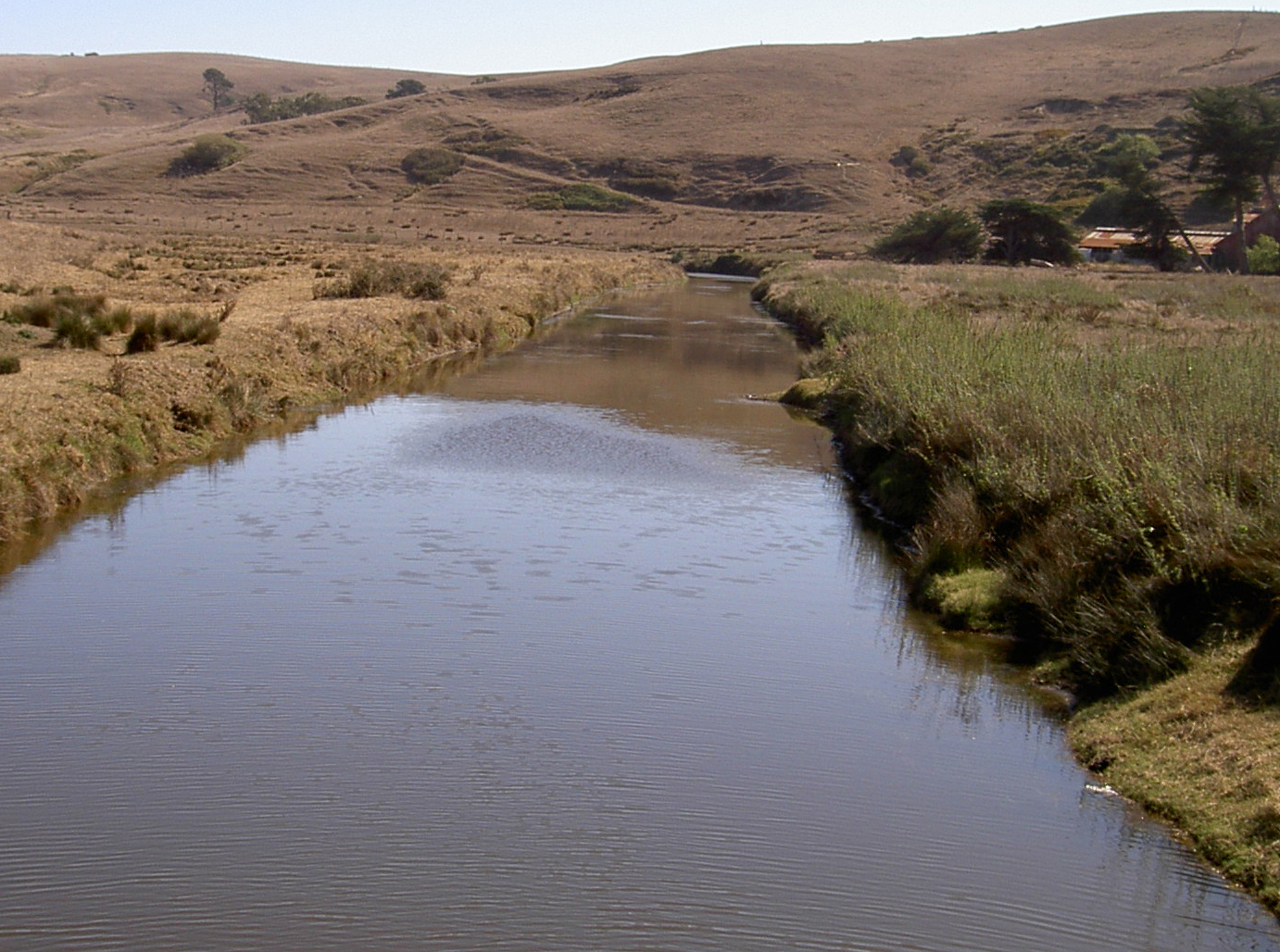
- Estero de San Antonio in 2008

- Location of the mouth of Estero de San Antonio in California
- Etymology: Spanish Saint Anthony's Estuary

Location
- Country: United States
- State: California
- Region: Marin and Sonoma counties

Physical characteristics
- Source
  - location: 1.5 mi (2.4 km) southwest of Bloomfield, California
  - coordinates: 38°18′11″N 122°52′37″W
  - elevation: 400 ft (120 m)
- Mouth: Bodega Bay
  - coordinates: 38°16′12″N 122°58′46″W
  - elevation: 0 ft (0 m)
- Length: 9.5 mi (15.3 km)
- Basin size: 50 sq mi (130 km^{2})

Basin features
- Tributaries
  - left: Stemple Creek

Estero de San Antonio is a stream in the northern California counties of Marin and Sonoma which empties into Bodega Bay.

== Course ==
The Estero springs just north of the Marin-Sonoma county line (from a hill overlooking Bloomfield, California) and runs south along Gericke Road into Marin County. Just north of Fallon-Two Rock Road, it turns west, flowing under the road just east of State Route 1. It flows south along the highway for 0.25 mi (0.4 km), then crosses under the highway at milepost 47.6 and continues west to a confluence with Stemple Creek 0.3 mi (0.5 km) southeast of Fallon, California. From there, it winds its way westward, passing under Middle Road and Valley Ford Franklin School Road before emptying into Bodega Bay 1.5 mi (2.4 km) north of Dillon Beach, California.

== Ecology ==
The Estero de San Antonio has a variety of habitat types, including freshwater ponds, mudflats, eelgrass and saltgrass area, and wooded ravines. It is estimated that the Estero has 923 acres (374 ha) of associated wetlands.

In the summer or early fall, a sandbar often forms at the mouth of the Estero, damming it until the winter rains arrive. Area residents used to blast the sandbar to dispel high salt concentrations in the Estero.

== Nomenclature ==
The United States Geological Survey's Geographic Names Information System cites ten variant names for this stream, including Stemple Creek (the name of its main tributary), Estero De Americano (almost identical to the parallel estuary 2 mi (3 km) north), Arroyo de San Antonio (also applied to Walker Creek, a parallel estuary 5 mi (8 km) south), and San Antonio Creek (the name of a creek further east along the county line). In particular, the Estero's watershed is often referred to as the Stemple Creek watershed. The stream is also referred to as Fallon Creek.

== Bridges ==
The Estero de San Antonio is crossed by three concrete continuous slab bridges:

- The Valley Ford Franklin School Road bridge, built in 1964, is 242 ft (74 m) long.
- The Middle Road bridge, built in 1958, is 196 ft (60 m) long.
- The State Route 1 bridge, built in 2001, is 62 ft (19 m) long.

It is also crossed at Fallon-Two Rock Road by a 22 ft (7 m) concrete tee beam bridge built in 1932.

== See also ==
- Estero Americano
- List of watercourses in the San Francisco Bay Area
- San Antonio Creek (Marin County, California)
