= Helen Putnam (mayor) =

American public health reformer (1857 – 1951)

Helen DuMont Putnam
- Born: May 4, 1909; Bakersfield, California
- Died: July 2, 1984 (aged 75); Petaluma, California
- Education: UC Berkeley
- Occupations: Schoolteacher, principal, mayor, county supervisor
- Known for: Historic preservation, slow-growth movement, urban green belt promotion
- Spouse: Rutherford ”Rudd” Putnam

Helen DuMont Putnam (4 May 1909 – 2 July 1984) was an American schoolteacher and local government official.

== Biography ==
Putnam was the first female mayor of Petaluma, serving from 1966 to 1978, and the second female member of the Sonoma County Board of Supervisors. She was the first woman president of the League of California Cities.

Her motto, inspired by her address at the corner of “B” and “Fair” Streets, was “Be Fair.” Putnam was the principal and first grade teacher of Two Rock Union School from 1963 to 1978, President of the local Democratic Club, and spearheaded an initiative to revitalize Petaluma, California's historic downtown.

In 1975, Putnam brought a legal dispute over urban growth limits to the Supreme Court and won a stay of order. The Supreme Court later refused to overturn a Ninth Circuit Court of Appeals ruling supporting Petaluma's goal "to preserve its small town character, its open spaces, and low density of population, and to grow at an orderly and deliberate pace."

Putnam was honored by the County of Sonoma with the 216-acre Helen Putnam Regional Park and by the League of California Cities with the Helen Putnam Award for Excellence to recognize and promote outstanding and innovative programs by California's cities that improve service delivery and community life.
