= Rancho San Jose (Pacheco) =

Mexican land grant in California

Coordinates: 38.080°N 122.550°W

Rancho San Jose was a 6,659-acre (26.95 km^{2}) Mexican land grant in present-day Marin County, California given in 1840 by Governor Juan Alvarado to Ygnacio Pacheco. The grant included the lands of Hamilton Air Force Base and the community of Ignacio.

== History ==
Ygnacio Pacheco (1808 - 1864) was the grandson of Juan Salvio Pacheco (1729 - 1777) and Maria Carmen del Valle, who came to California in 1776 with the Anza Expedition. Ygnacio Pacheco was born in San Jose, the only child of Ygnacio Bernardino Pacheco, the alcalde of San Jose and cousin of Salvio Pacheco, founder of Concord. Ygnacio Pacheco was a soldier at the Presidio of San Francisco. He retired in 1838 and was granted one and a half leagues in 1840. In 1846 he was alcalde of San Rafael.

With the cession of California to the United States following the Mexican-American War, the 1848 Treaty of Guadalupe Hidalgo provided that the land grants would be honored. As required by the Land Act of 1851, a claim for Rancho San Jose was filed with the Public Land Commission in 1852, and the grant was patented to Ygnacio Pacheco in 1861.

Ygnacio Pacheco was married three times (Josefa Higuera, Guadalupe Duarte and Maria Loreto Duarte). When Pacheco died in 1864, he left the rancho to his five sons and one daughter. Maria Loreto Duarte, Ygnacio Pacheco’s widow married James Black, grantee of Rancho Cañada de Jonive and owner of Rancho Cañada de Herrera.

== See also ==
- Ranchos of California
- List of Ranchos of California
