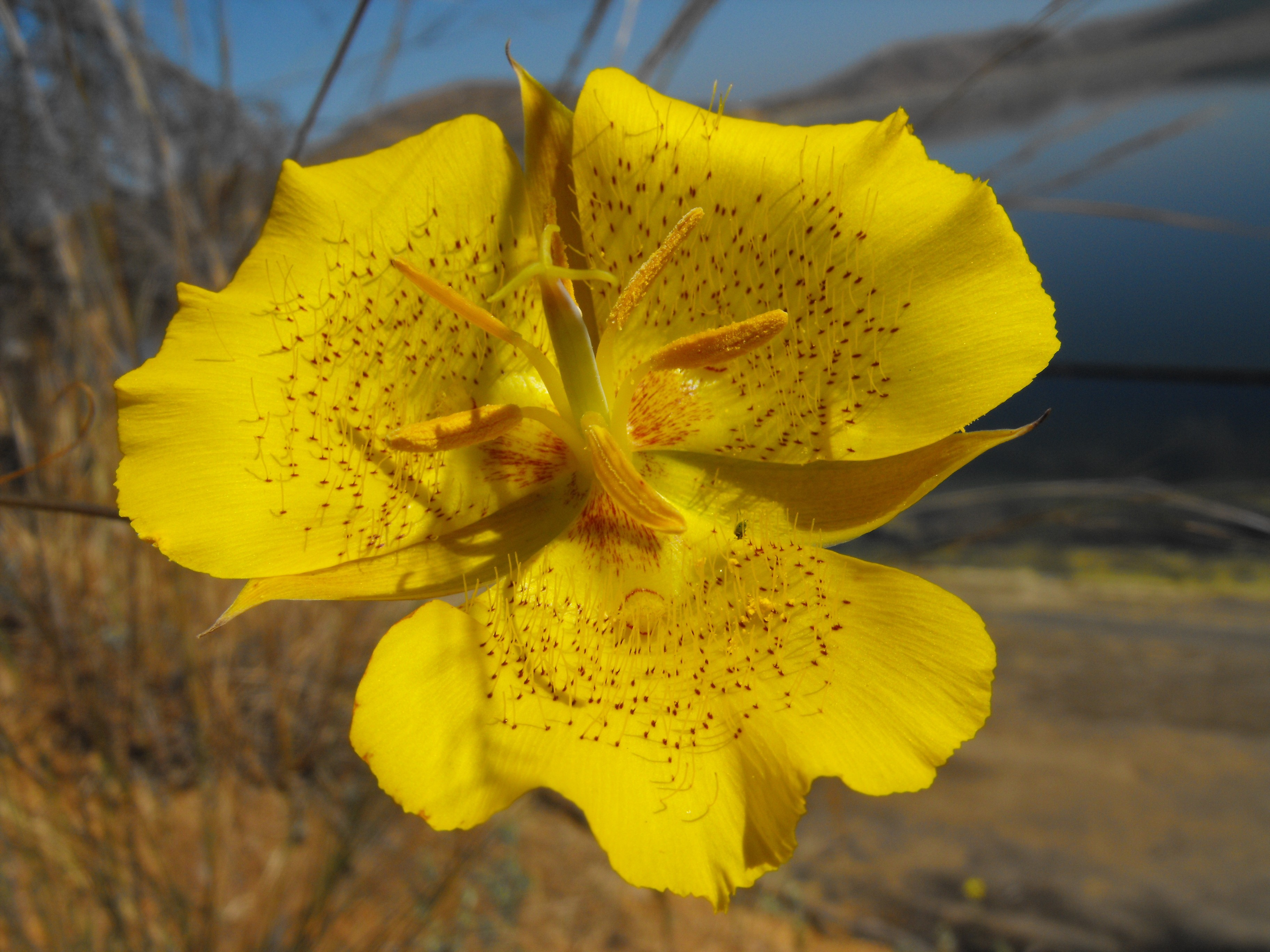

Conservation status
- Vulnerable (NatureServe)

Scientific classification
- Kingdom: Plantae
- Clade: Tracheophytes
- Clade: Angiosperms
- Clade: Monocots
- Order: Liliales
- Family: Liliaceae
- Genus: Calochortus
- Species: C. weedii

Binomial name
- Calochortus weedii Alph.Wood

Synonyms
- Calochortus luteus var. weedii (Alph.Wood) Baker; Cyclobothra weedii (Alph.Wood) Hoover; Calochortus citrinus Baker; Calochortus weedii var. albus Purdy

= Calochortus weedii =

Species of flowering plant

Calochortus weedii is a North American species of flowering plants in the lily family known by the common name Weed's mariposa lily.

It is native to the Outer Southern California Coast Ranges and the Transverse Ranges in Southern California, and the Peninsular Ranges in Southern California and Baja California. It is a member of the chaparral flora. Most of the California locales occur between Santa Barbara County and San Diego County, but there is a report of an isolated population along Salmon Creek in southern Monterey County.

== Description ==
Calochortus weedii is a perennial herb producing a slender, branching stem 30 to 90 centimeters tall.

There is a basal leaf up to 40 centimeters long which withers by the time the plant blooms.

The inflorescence bears 2 to 6 erect, widely bell-shaped to spreading flowers. Each flower has three narrow sepals and three wider and sometimes shorter petals, each segment up to 3 centimeters long. The petals are oval or wedge-shaped and may be any of a variety of colors, from cream to deep yellow to reddish purple. The petals often have reddish brown borders and flecks, and a coating of hairs on the inner surface.

The fruit is an angled capsule 4 to 5 centimeters long.

=== Varieties ===
Image	Scientific name	Distribution
	Calochortus weedii var. intermedius Ownbey	Orange, Los Angeles, + Riverside Counties
	Calochortus weedii var. peninsularis Ownbey	Baja California
	Calochortus weedii var. weedii	California + Baja California

=== formerly included ===
Three taxa once considered varieties of Calochortus weedii are now generally classified as distinct species:

- Calochortus weedii var. obispoensis, now called Calochortus obispoensis
- Calochortus weedii var. purpurascens, now called Calochortus fimbriatus
- Calochortus weedii var. vestus, now called Calochortus fimbriatus
