= Rancho Cañada de Pogolimi =

Mexican land grant in California

Coordinates: 38.340°N 122.880°W

Rancho Cañada de Pogolimi (also called "Cañada de Pogolome" and "Cañada de Pogolomi") was a 8,781.81-acre (35.5387 km^{2}) Mexican land grant in present-day Sonoma County, California given in 1844 by Governor Manuel Micheltorena to María Antonia Cazares, widow of James Dawson. The grant encompasses present-day Bloomfield.

== History ==
At the direction of Governor José Figueroa in 1835, Mariano Guadalupe Vallejo began construction of the Presidio of Sonoma to counter the Russian presence at Fort Ross. To extend the settlements in the direction of Fort Ross, Vallejo sent three men, Edward McIntosh, James Black (1810–1870), and James Dawson, in that direction. These three men came to California as sailors with Captain John B.R. Cooper, brother-in-law of General Vallejo. Black settled upon what is now known as Rancho Cañada de Jonive, while Dawson and McIntosh settled upon Rancho Estero Americano. They formed a partnership to build a saw-mill on Salmon Creek, near the town of Freestone. The Russian-American Company left Fort Ross and sold it to John Sutter in 1841. The mill on Rancho Cañada de Jonive operated until 1849, when they sold all the lumber they had and left for the gold mines.

McIntosh and Dawson agreed to make application jointly to the Mexican government for the two square league grant known as the Rancho Estero Americano, to confirm the title given them by General Vallejo. McIntosh went the capital in Monterey to get the necessary papers in 1839. However at that time, the Mexican authorities did not like making grants to multiple owners. When McIntosh returned, Dawson on examining the papers, found that they were made out only in the name of McIntosh. Tradition has it that when Dawson made this discovery, he sawed the house, in which McIntosh and Dawson had been living, in two parts, and removed his half to what would become Dawson's Rancho Cañada de Pogolimi grant. In June 1840, James Dawson married 14-year-old María Antonia Cazares (also spelled Caceres and Caseres), born the daughter of a Spanish sergeant of dragoons in 1826. Dawson continued to reside on his rancho with his wife until his death in October 1843. The Rancho Cañada de Pogolimi grant was made to his widow, María Antonia Cazares (1826–1880) in February 1844.

María Antonia Cazares de Dawson married Frederick Gustavus Blume (1815–1890), a Sonoma, California physician, surgeon and merchant, in November 1847. Blume was born in Bautzen, Kingdom of Saxony in 1815, and first traveled to California in late 1842. From Sonoma, Blume put his brother-in-law Henry Hagler in charge of his wife's rancho for the winter. The Blumes moved from Sonoma to live on the rancho in 1848, on a prominence overlooking the town of Freestone. The town of Bloomfield, located on the rancho, was named in honor of Blume. Though not an American citizen at the time, Blume was elected to the first Territorial Legislature which met in San Jose, California in 1849. Blume was appointed postmaster of Freestone in 1870, and justice of the peace in 1873.

With the cession of California to the United States following the Mexican-American War, the 1848 Treaty of Guadalupe Hidalgo provided that the land grants would be honored. As required by the Land Act of 1851, a claim for Rancho Cañada de Pogolimi was filed with the Public Land Commission in 1852, and the grant was patented to María Antonia Cazares in 1858.

In the 1840s, María Antonia Caceres de Blume cared for her elderly mother and father, who had moved from San Francisco to be near her. Francisco Caceres died in Freestone in 1848 at the age of 76 and his wife Anastasia Boronda Caceres died the next year. María Antonia Caceres de Blume died childless at the age of 54 in 1880. Frederick Blume was forced by a settlers' league to sell much of his valuable estate at nominal prices; at his death in 1890 he owned little of the original grant.
