= Two Rock (disambiguation) =

Two Rock is a mountain in Ireland.

Two Rock(s) may also refer to:

- Two Rock, California
- Two Rocks, Western Australia

== See also ==
- Two Rock Ranch Station, former name of a Coast Guard training facility in Sonoma and Marin Counties, California
