= Rancho Estero Americano =

Mexican land grant in California

Coordinates: 38.37°N 122.95°W

Rancho Estero Americano was a 8,849-acre (35.81 km^{2}) Mexican land grant in present-day Sonoma County, California given in 1839 by Governor Pro-tem Manuel Jimeno to Edward Manuel McIntosh. The rancho takes its name from Estero Americano.

== History ==
At the direction of Governor José Figueroa in 1835, Mariano Guadalupe Vallejo began construction of the Presidio of Sonoma to counter the Russian presence at Fort Ross. To extend the settlements in the direction of Fort Ross, Vallejo sent three men, Edward McIntosh, James Black (1810–1870), and James Dawson (–1843), in that direction. These three men came to California as sailors with Captain John B.R. Cooper, brother-in-law of General Vallejo. Black settled upon what is now known as Rancho Cañada de Jonive, while Dawson and McIntosh settled upon Rancho Estero Americano. They formed a partnership to build a saw-mill on Salmon Creek, near the town of Freestone. The Russian-American Company left Fort Ross and sold it to John Sutter in 1841. The mill on Rancho Cañada de Jonive operated until 1849, when they sold all the lumber they had and left for the gold mines.

McIntosh and Dawson agreed to make application jointly to the Mexican government for the 2 square league grant known as the Rancho Estero Americano, to confirm the title given by General Vallejo. McIntosh went the capital in Monterey to get the necessary papers in 1839. When he returned, Dawson on examining the papers, found that they were made out only in the name of McIntosh. Well authenticated tradition says that when Dawson made this discovery, he sawed the house, in which McIntosh and Dawson had been living, in two parts, and removed his half to what would become Dawson's Rancho Cañada de Pogolimi grant. Edward McIntosh, who never married, became alcalde of San Rafael. In 1849 Jasper O'Farrell bought Rancho Estero Americano from McIntosh.

With the cession of California to the United States following the Mexican-American War, the 1848 Treaty of Guadalupe Hidalgo provided that the land grants would be honored. As required by the Land Act of 1851, a claim for Rancho Estero Americano was filed with the Public Land Commission in 1852, and the grant was patented to Jasper O'Farrell in 1858.

O’Farrell also obtained Rancho Cañada de Jonive by trading his Rancho Nicasio holding for Black's Rancho Cañada de Jonive in 1848. O'Farrell married Mary McChristian in 1849 and they moved to Rancho Cañada de Jonive, and resided there until his death in 1875.
