= Shirlee Zane =

American politician

Member of the Sonoma County Board of Supervisors from District 3
- In office January 6, 2009 – January 5, 2021
- Preceded by: Tim Smith
- Succeeded by: Chris Coursey

Chair Pro Tem of the Sonoma County
- In office January 6, 2020 – January 5, 2021
- Preceded by: Lynda Hopkins
- Succeeded by: Chris Coursey

Personal details
- Born: 1959 (age 66–67)
- Party: Democratic
- Education: Chico State University (BA); Trinity Evangelical Divinity School (MA); Sonoma State University (MA)
- Occupation: Politician
- Profession: Nonprofit executive, family therapist
- Website: Board of Supervisors; District 3 website

Shirlee Zane is an American politician. She served as a member of the Sonoma County Board of Supervisors representing Supervisorial District 3, which includes part of the cities of Santa Rosa and Rohnert Park.

== Early life and education ==
Zane was raised in Southern California. She received her Bachelor of Arts in speech pathology from Chico State University in 1982, a Master of Arts in family counseling from Sonoma State University, and a Master of Arts in divinity from Trinity Evangelical Divinity School.

== Career ==
Before election to the Board of Supervisors, Zane worked as a family therapist, minister, hospital chaplain, special education professional, and social worker. Zane worked in Caracas, Venezuela, and inner city settings of Humboldt Park, Chicago and South Los Angeles, before moving to Sonoma County in 1990.

She was appointed Executive Director of Hospital Chaplaincy Services in 1994, and later served as CEO of the Council on Aging for ten years.

Zane was first elected to the Sonoma County Board of Supervisors in the November 2008 election, defeating former Santa Rosa city councilwoman Sharon Wright with 55% of the vote. She was sworn in on January 6, 2009.

She defeated former Rohnert Park city councilman Tim Smith in June 2012 for election to a second term, with 63.2% of the vote.

Zane's reelection to a third term in 2016, along with the reelection of Susan Gorin and election of Lynda Hopkins, created a female majority on the board for the first time.

She lost reelection to former Santa Rosa mayor Chris Coursey on March 3, 2020, with 46% of the vote. Coursey's win marked the first successful challenge to an incumbent of the Sonoma County Board of Supervisors since 1984.

== Personal life ==
Zane married Greg Herrick, a descendant of Mexican land grantees Henry D. Fitch and María Ygnacia López de Carrillo, in 1982. She gave birth to a son in 1988, who she raised as a single mother.

Her second husband, Peter Kingston, committed suicide in 2011. She spoke out about social stigma after his death, saying "we can not prevent suicide if we don’t talk about it."

Zane dated the widower Coursey, her 2020 election opponent, from 2011 to 2014.

Following the death of Zane's mother in 2014, she adopted Lucy, a therapy horse.
