= Stemple =

A stemple ia a shelf set into a mineshaft for storing waste material, or for use as a step or support.

It may also refer to:

- Adam Stemple, an American musician
- Stemple Creek, a stream in California
- Lisa Stemple, a character in the sitcom Mad About You

== See also ==
- Stempel
