= Stempel =

A stempel is a shelf set into a mineshaft for storing waste material, or for use as a step or support.

Stempel is also a surname. Notable people with the surname include:

- Gary Stempel (born 1957), English-Panamanian football manager
- Herbert Stempel (1926-2020), television game show contestant who exposed the rigging of results in the 1950s quiz show Twenty One
- Robert Stempel (1933–2011), Chairman and CEO of General Motors
- Wolf-Dieter Stempel (1929-2026) German Romance Scholar

Fictional characters:

- Aaron Stempel, fictional character on the television show Here Come the Brides and the Star Trek novel Ishmael (as Aaron Stemple)

== See also ==
- Stemple
- D Stempel AG type foundry
- Stempel Garamond typeface
