= Helen Putnam Regional Park =

Regional park in Petaluma, California

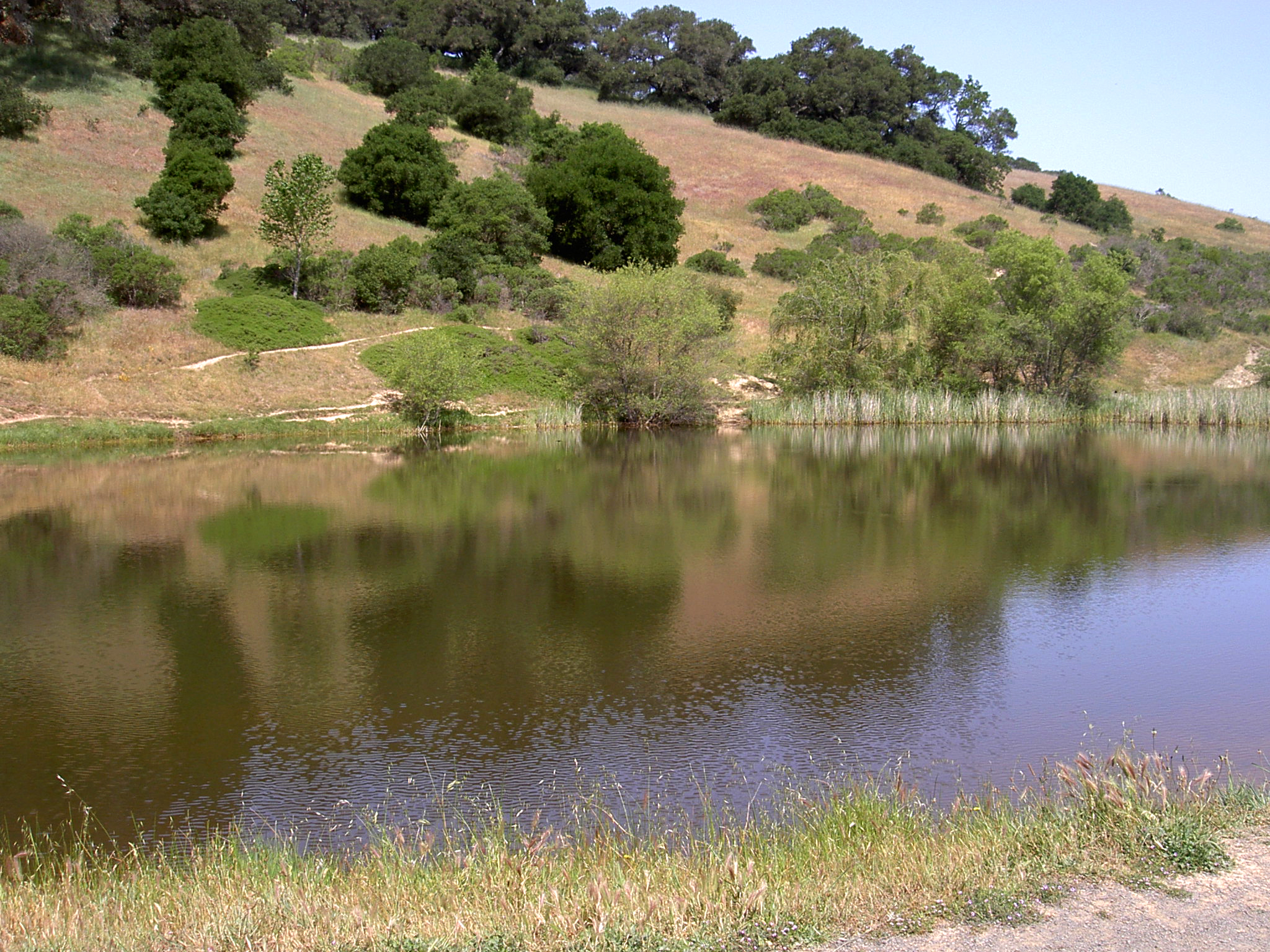
- Fish pond at Helen Putnam Regional Park
- Interactive map of Helen Putnam Regional Park
- Type: regional park
- Location: Petaluma, California, United States
- Area: 216 acres (87 ha)
- Created: 1985
- Operator: Sonoma County Regional Parks Department
- Open: Daily, sunrise to sunset
- Status: Open all year

Helen Putnam Regional Park is a regional park southwest of Petaluma, California, which is maintained by the Sonoma County Regional Parks Department. It covers an area of 216 acres (87 ha). The park entrance is at 411 Chileno Valley Road.

== History ==
The park is named after Helen Putnam (mayor), a former teacher who was the first female mayor of Petaluma, serving from 1966 to 1978, and the second female member of the Sonoma County Board of Supervisors.

In 1975, Putnam spearheaded Petaluma's right to control urban growth limits. The city was sued by developers. The case went all the way to the Supreme Court and won a stay of order. The Supreme Court later refused to overturn a Ninth Circuit Court of Appeals ruling supporting Petaluma's goal "to preserve its small town character, its open spaces, and low density of population, and to grow at an orderly and deliberate pace."

The park's official dedication took place in 1985.

== Facilities and features ==
The park features numerous trails suitable for hiking, bicycling, and horseback riding. The trails include a segment of the Bay Area Ridge Trail.

The main parking lot at 411 Chileno Valley Road has 37 spaces, including spaces for handicapped and equestrian users. There is a gazebo, a picnic area, and a children's playground near the parking area, and a pond stocked with bluegill.

Another parking lot was opened in 2021 at 373 Windsor Drive, at the West Wind Trailhead. It has 31 parking spaces and bike parking.
