= Chris Coursey =

American politician

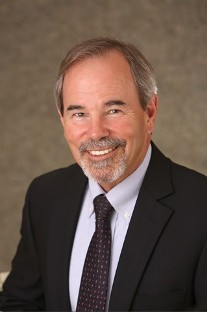

Member of the Sonoma County Board of Supervisors from the 3rd district
- Incumbent
- Assumed office January 5, 2021
- Preceded by: Shirlee Zane

Chair of the Sonoma County Board of Supervisors
- In office January 10, 2023 – January 9, 2024
- Preceded by: James Gore
- Succeeded by: David Rabbitt

Vice Chair of the Sonoma County Board of Supervisors
- Incumbent
- Assumed office January 6, 2026
- Preceded by: Rebecca Hermosillo
- In office January 4, 2022 – January 10, 2023
- Preceded by: James Gore
- Succeeded by: David Rabbitt

Chair Pro Tem of the Sonoma County Board of Supervisors
- In office January 5, 2021 – January 4, 2022
- Preceded by: Shirlee Zane
- Succeeded by: David Rabbitt

Mayor of Santa Rosa, California
- In office December 6, 2016 – December 18, 2018
- Succeeded by: Tom Schwedhelm

Personal details
- Born: November 21, 1954 (age 71)
- Education: University of Northern Colorado (BA)

Chris Coursey (born November 21, 1954) is an American politician and former journalist serving as a member of the Sonoma County Board of Supervisors. Representing District 3, Coursey assumed office in 2021. He previously served as the mayor of Santa Rosa, California from December 6, 2016 to December 18, 2018.

== Early life and education ==
The son of a military officer, Coursey attended six different schools before graduating from Regis Jesuit High School in Aurora, Colorado. He had previously lived in twelve cities across five states. He earned a Bachelor of Arts degree in journalism and sociology from the University of Northern Colorado.

== Career ==
Coursey worked as a daily journalist in Colorado Springs, Colorado before moving to Santa Rosa, where he covered crime, government, and politics The Press Democrat. In 2007, he left his job to work on the Sonoma–Marin Area Rail Transit, (SMART) train project. Coursey was elected to the Santa Rosa City Council in 2014, and served as mayor from 2016 to 2018. His vice mayor was Jack Tibbets, the youngest council member in city history.

Coursey won election to the Sonoma County Board of Supervisors on March 3, 2020, with 54% of the vote over three-term incumbent supervisor Shirlee Zane. Coursey’s win marked the first successful challenge to an incumbent of the Sonoma County Board of Supervisors since 1984.

== Personal life ==
Coursey's wife died of cancer in 2010. He has four children. Coursey dated the widow Zane, his 2020 election opponent, from 2011 to 2014.
