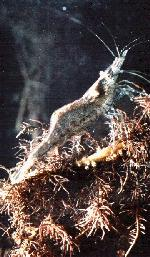
- Syncaris pacifica

Scientific classification
- Kingdom: Animalia
- Phylum: Arthropoda
- Class: Malacostraca
- Order: Decapoda
- Suborder: Pleocyemata
- Infraorder: Caridea
- Family: Atyidae
- Genus: Syncaris; Holmes, 1900

Species
- Syncaris pacifica †Syncaris pasadenae

= Syncaris =

Genus of crustaceans

Syncaris is a genus of shrimp, containing only two species: the endangered California freshwater shrimp, Syncaris pacifica, and the extinct Pasadena freshwater shrimp, Syncaris pasadenae. This genus is one of only two genera of freshwater Atyid shrimp found in North America, with the other being the genus Palaemonias, which contains two endangered, cave-dwelling shrimp species. The genus Syncaris may have arisen during the Mesozoic, with the family Atyidae likely being of Jurassic origin.
