= Syncaris pasadenae =

Conservation status
- Extinct (yes) (IUCN 3.1)

- Presumed Extinct (yes) (NatureServe)

Scientific classification
- Kingdom: Animalia
- Phylum: Arthropoda
- Clade: Pancrustacea
- Class: Malacostraca
- Order: Decapoda
- Suborder: Pleocyemata
- Infraorder: Caridea
- Family: Atyidae
- Genus: Syncaris
- Species: †S. pasadenae

Binomial name
- †Syncaris pasadenae (Kingsley, 1897)

Synonyms
- Caridina pasadenae Kingsley, 1897; Syncaris pasadenas (Kingsley, 1897); Syncaris trewi Holmes, 1900

Extinct species of crustacean

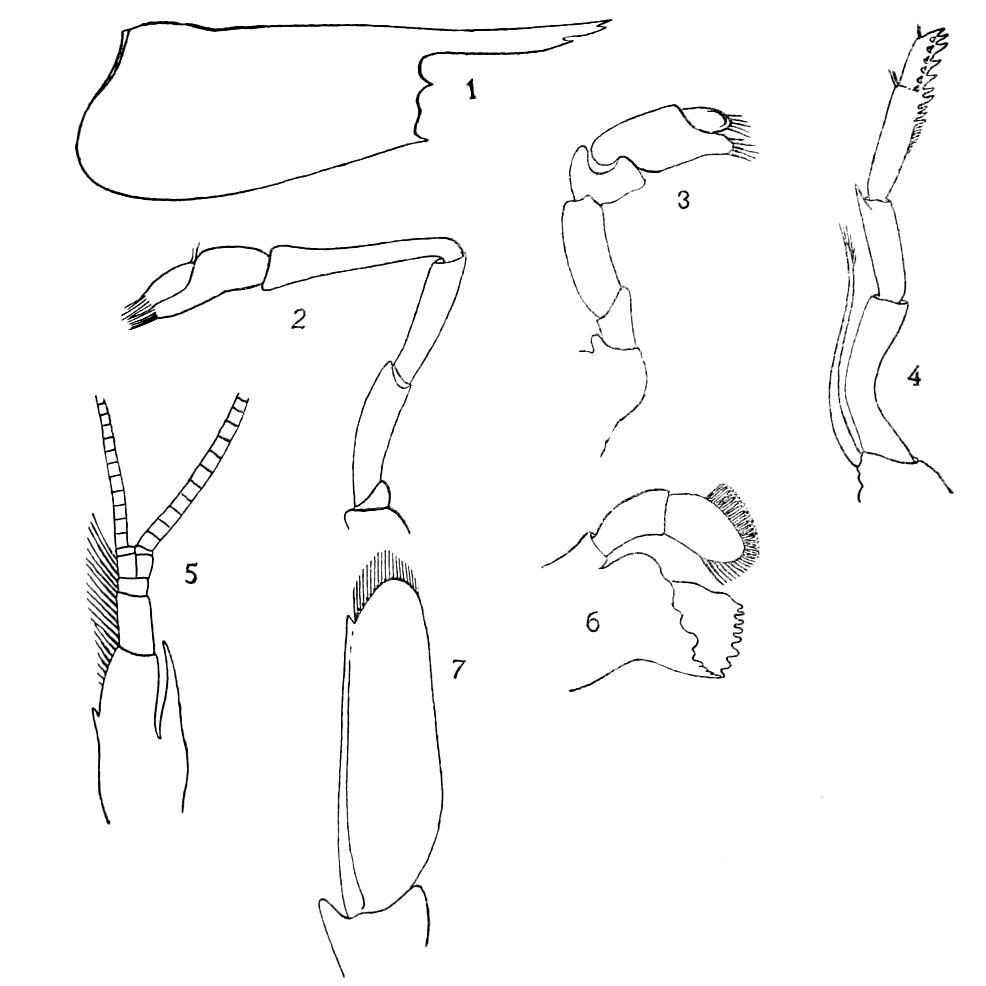
Figs. 1-7. Syncaris pasadenae (Caradina pasadena). 1. Carapax. 2. Second pereiopod. 3. First pereiopod. 4. External maxilliped. 5. Base of antennæ. 6. Mandible. 7. Antennal scale.

Syncaris pasadenae is an extinct species of freshwater shrimp in the family Atyidae.

It lived in the drainage basin of the Los Angeles River, near Pasadena, San Gabriel and Warm Creek, and was originally described from material collected near where the Rose Bowl now stands. A reference to "freshwater shrimps" in a tributary of the Santa Ana River from 1927 may also refer to S. pasadenae. At the time it was described, in 1897, it was noted as "common" in the streams where it was found.

Its habitat was destroyed by channelization of streams and none of the streams where this species was once found remain in a natural state. It has not been seen alive since 1933, despite extensive searching, and is the only recent species of shrimp known to have gone extinct.

Due to its extinction prior to detailed study, little is known of the natural history of this species. However, based on collected specimens, it seems likely that this species had a winter breeding season, as does its closest relative, Syncaris pacifica. Breeding in the winter is likely an adaptation to the annual precipitation cycle of the area, which results in the freshwater streams where this species occurred nearly drying up in the summer, making summer a disadvantageous time for reproduction.
