= Ignacio, California =

Unincorporated community in Marin County, California, US

Ignacio
- Unincorporated community
- Location in California Ignacio (the United States)
- Coordinates: 38°04′13″N 122°32′19″W
- Country: United States
- State: California
- County: Marin
- Elevation: 23 ft (7 m)

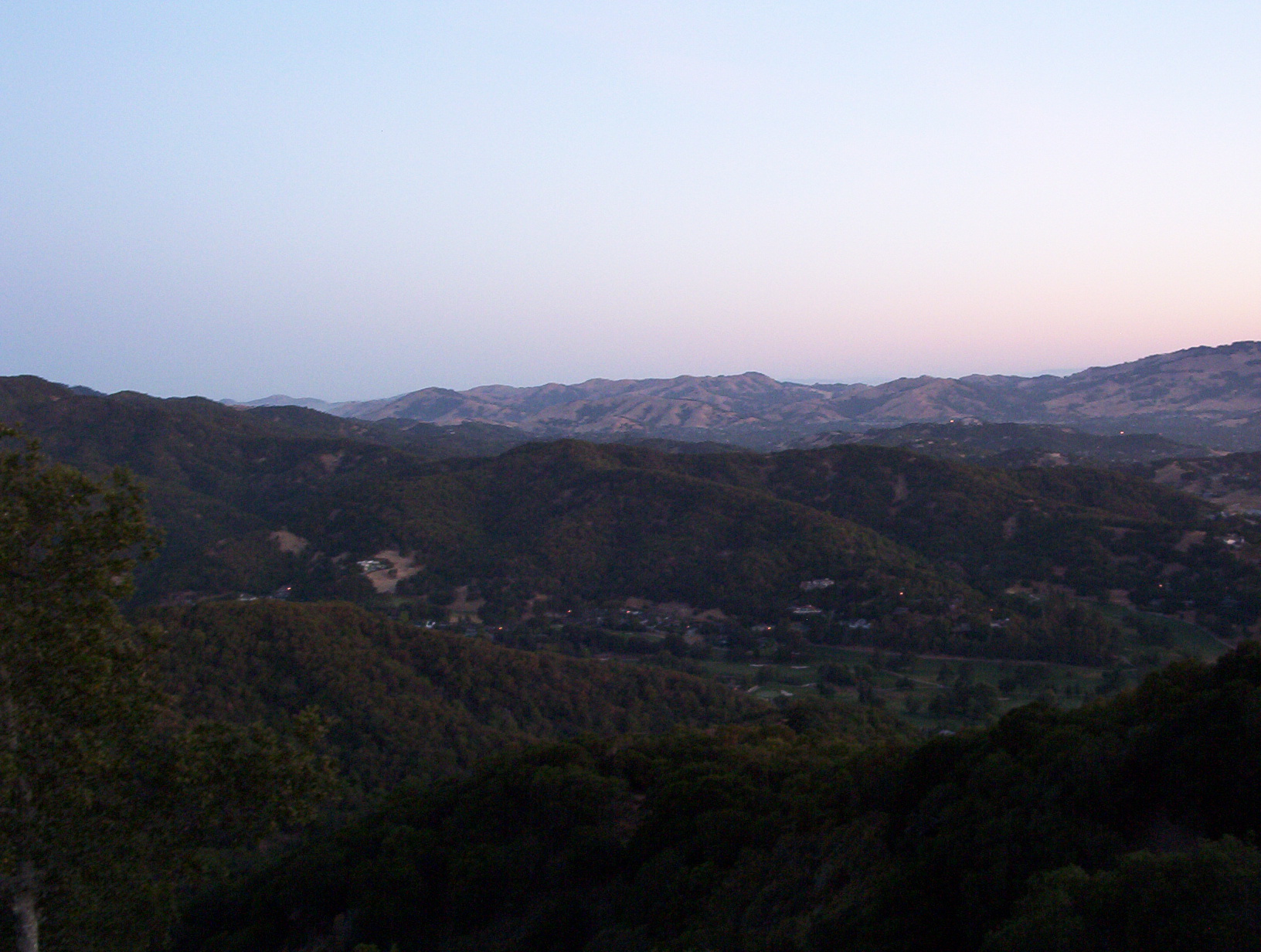
An early morning view from Big Rock Ridge trail.

Ignacio (formerly Pacheco) is an unincorporated community in Marin County, California, United States. It is located 3 miles (4.8 km) southeast of downtown Novato, at an elevation of 30 feet (9 m).

Ignacio is a neighborhood located west of Bel Marin Keys. According to the U.S. Geological Survey (USGS), it is located at 38°04′13″N 122°32′19″W, placing it north of the interchange of U.S. Route 101 and Ignacio Boulevard in Novato.

== History ==
Two authenticated Coast Miwok villages existed near Ignacio: Puyuku (south of the town) and Shotokmo-cha (to the southeast).

During the 1840s and 1850s, Ignacio was part of Rancho San Jose, a 6,659-acre (26.95 km^{2}) land grant which Governor Alvarado awarded to Ignacio Pacheco. After Ignacio died in 1864, his estate was divided among his heirs.

During World War II, Ignacio became the site of military housing for Hamilton Air Force Base. These military houses were eventually torn down and replaced by a more suburban community.

The Ignacio post office opened in 1893, closed in 1944, and re-opened in 1961.

== See also ==
- Northwestern Pacific Railroad
