= Stemple Creek =

Stream in Sonoma and Marin Counties, CA

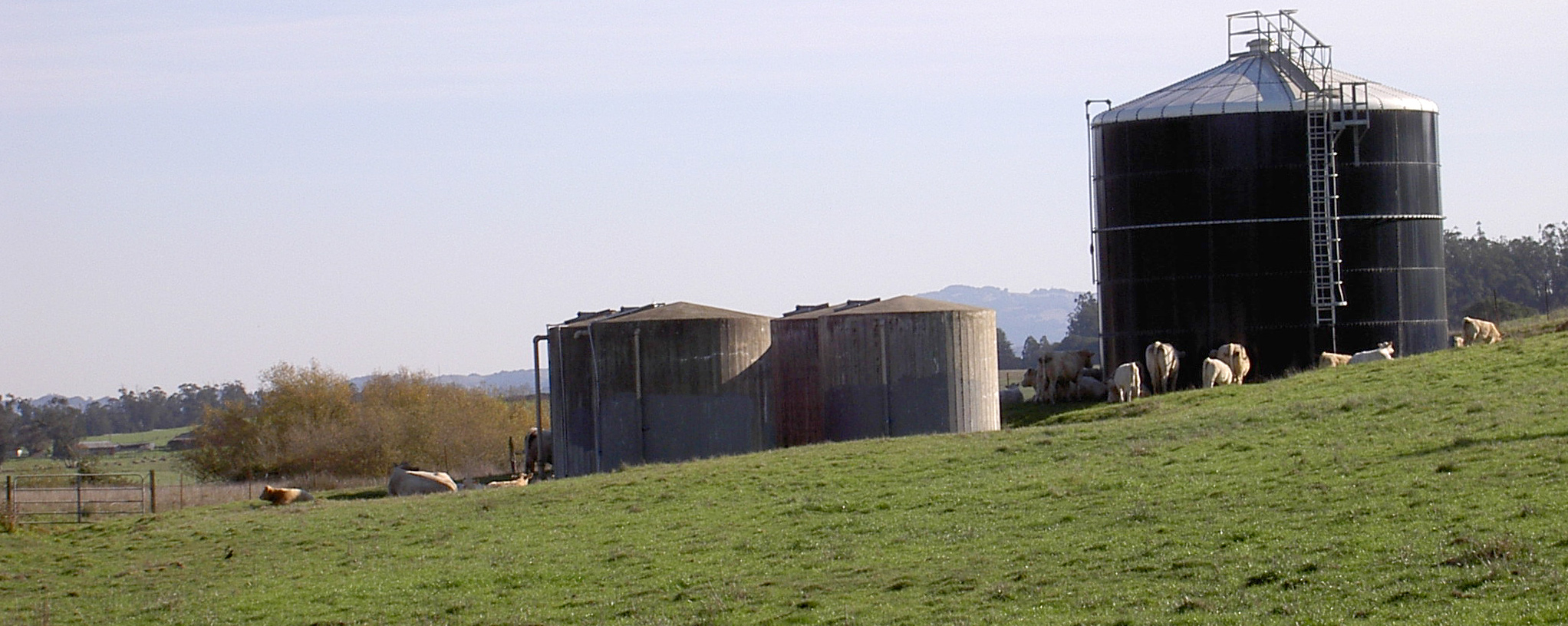
- Cattle in a pasture near the headwaters of Stemple Creek

- Location of the mouth of Stemple Creek in California

Location
- Country: United States
- State: California
- Region: Sonoma and Marin counties
- City: Fallon, California

Physical characteristics
- Source
  - location: 2 mi (3 km) southwest of Cotati, California
  - coordinates: 38°18′38″N 122°43′51″W
- Mouth: Estero de San Antonio
  - coordinates: 38°16′20″N 122°54′7″W
  - elevation: 13 ft (4.0 m)
- Length: 16 mi (26 km)

Stemple Creek is a 16 mi (26 km) long, westward-flowing stream in the California counties of Sonoma and Marin, which feeds into the Estero de San Antonio. Its waters ultimately reach Bodega Bay, part of the Gulf of the Farallones National Marine Sanctuary on the Pacific Ocean.

== Course ==
Stemple Creek springs from low-lying coastal hills 2 mi (3 km) southwest of Cotati. It crosses under Stony Point Road and runs about 1 mi (1.6 km) southeast before turning westward. It passes south of Two Rock, California, then crosses into Marin County just west of Training Center Petaluma. The creek follows a sinuous course across northern West Marin, with bridges at Alexander Road, Twin Bridge Road, and State Route 1, to a confluence with the Estero de San Antonio just west of State Route 1.

== Environmental factors ==
California's 1994 water quality report designated Stemple Creek as an "impaired" streamway as defined in section 303(d) of the Federal Water Resource Statutes, due to runoff from pasture land and feedlots. Pollutants found at hazardous level in the creek have included copper, ammonia, and zinc.

== Bridges ==
Bridges cross Stemple Creek at Route One, Pepper Road, Twin Bridge Road, Alexander Road, Tomales Road, Valley Ford Road, Mecham Road, and Pepper Road. The newest and longest of these, built in 1982, is the 210 ft (64 m) long concrete slab structure at milepost 47.41 on State Route 1. The oldest, built in 1915, is the 39 ft (11.9 m) concrete tee beam bridge carrying Valley Ford Road, located 7.5 mi (12.1 km) from State Route 1.

== See also ==
- Americano Creek
- List of watercourses in the San Francisco Bay Area
