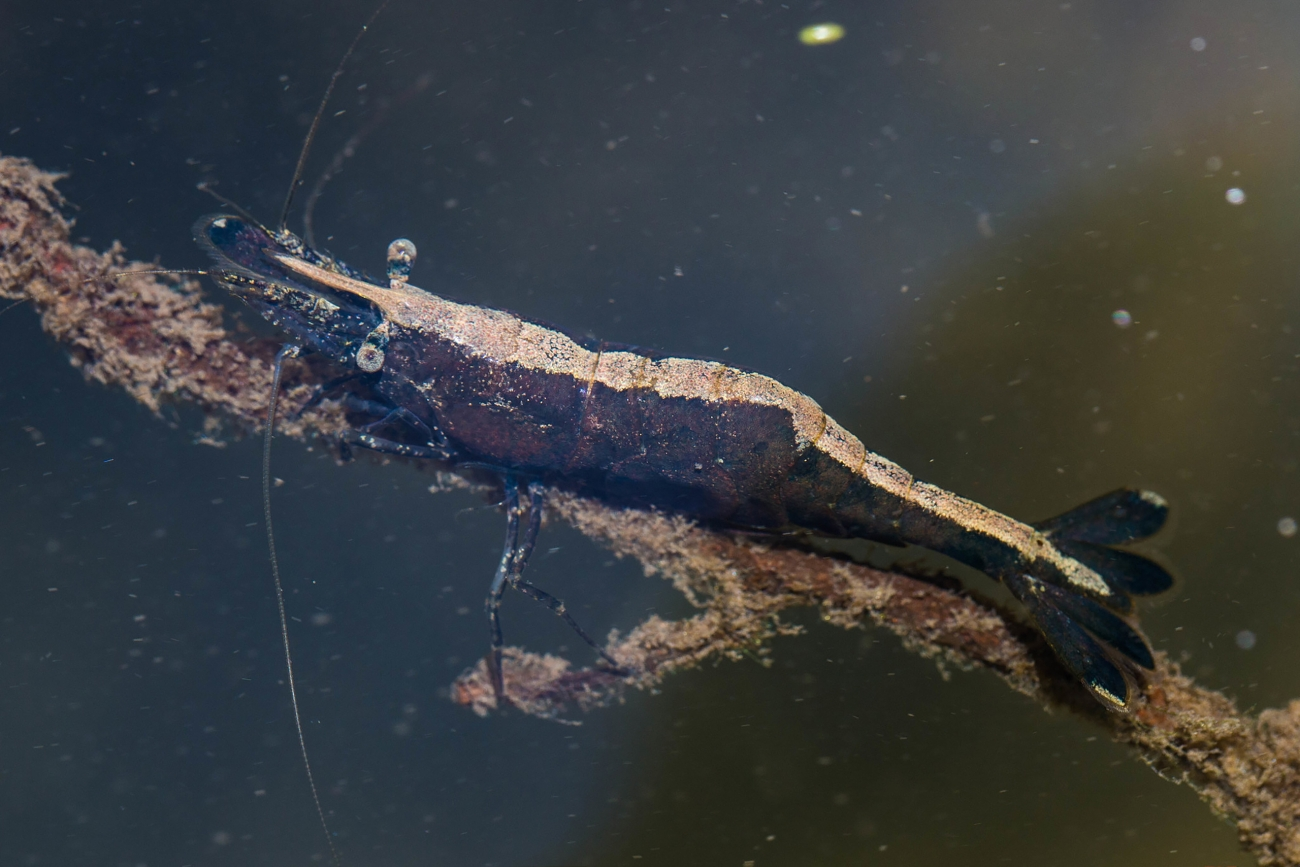

Conservation status
- Endangered (IUCN 3.1)

- Critically Imperiled (NatureServe)
- Endangered (ESA)

Scientific classification
- Kingdom: Animalia
- Phylum: Arthropoda
- Clade: Pancrustacea
- Class: Malacostraca
- Order: Decapoda
- Suborder: Pleocyemata
- Infraorder: Caridea
- Family: Atyidae
- Genus: Syncaris
- Species: S. pacifica

Binomial name
- Syncaris pacifica (Holmes, 1895)

Synonyms
- Miersia pacifica Holmes, 1895

= Syncaris pacifica =

Species of crustacean

Syncaris pacifica is an endangered species of freshwater shrimp in the family Atyidae that occurs only in a limited range within the northern San Francisco Bay Area, California, USA. Specifically, this species occurs only in 17 stream segments within Sonoma, Napa and Marin Counties. This species is often translucent to transparent, with both sexes capable of considerable coloration altering, as a sophisticated form of camouflage. This decapod is commonly known as California freshwater shrimp, and is the only extant decapod shrimp in California that occurs in non-saline waters (its congener Syncaris pasadenae from the basin of the Los Angeles River is extinct).

S. pacifica is one of only four members of the family Atyidae in North America. Genetic studies have been conducted to compare specimens of Syncaris pacifica from various drainages, with the results showing a variety of well-defined genetic variations within these populations. The species has a superficial appearance to its better known marine relatives, and may attain a body length of about 5 centimetres (2.0 in).

== Morphology ==
Syncaris pacifica is a ten-legged crustacean that employs a two-pronged approach to camouflage: it uses a technique of translucency coupled with strategically placed chromatophores, which occur internally as well as on the surface. As a result, the clustered color-producing cells combined with translucency masks the body outline and blends the organism to its subsurface environment. Consequently, an illusion is presented that S. pacifica are submerged, decaying vegetation. California freshwater shrimp move quite torpidly and are practically invisible among water column leaf and twig substrates, and among the slender, exposed, living roots of riparian vegetation along undercut stream banks.

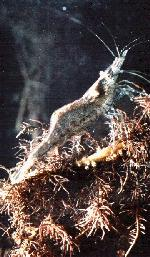
Syncaris pacifica

Males and juveniles are always translucent or transparent, while coloration of the sometimes translucent females ranges from dark brown to purple, some with a broad tan dorsal band. Females may change rapidly from this very dark cryptic color to nearly transparent with diffuse chromatophores. Moreover, females are typically longer and deeper bodied than males. Out of the water, the species' general color is a mix of green and gray.

All members of family Atyidae can be distinguished from other shrimp by their overall length as well as the extent length of their pincer-like claws and manifestation of terminal bristles (setae) at the tips of the first and second chelae. A short spine above the eye and the angled articulation of the second chelae with the carpus differentiate the California freshwater shrimp from other shrimp that occur California. A carapace length (reckoned from eye socket to tail-tip) of slightly more than five centimeters can be attained.

== Range ==
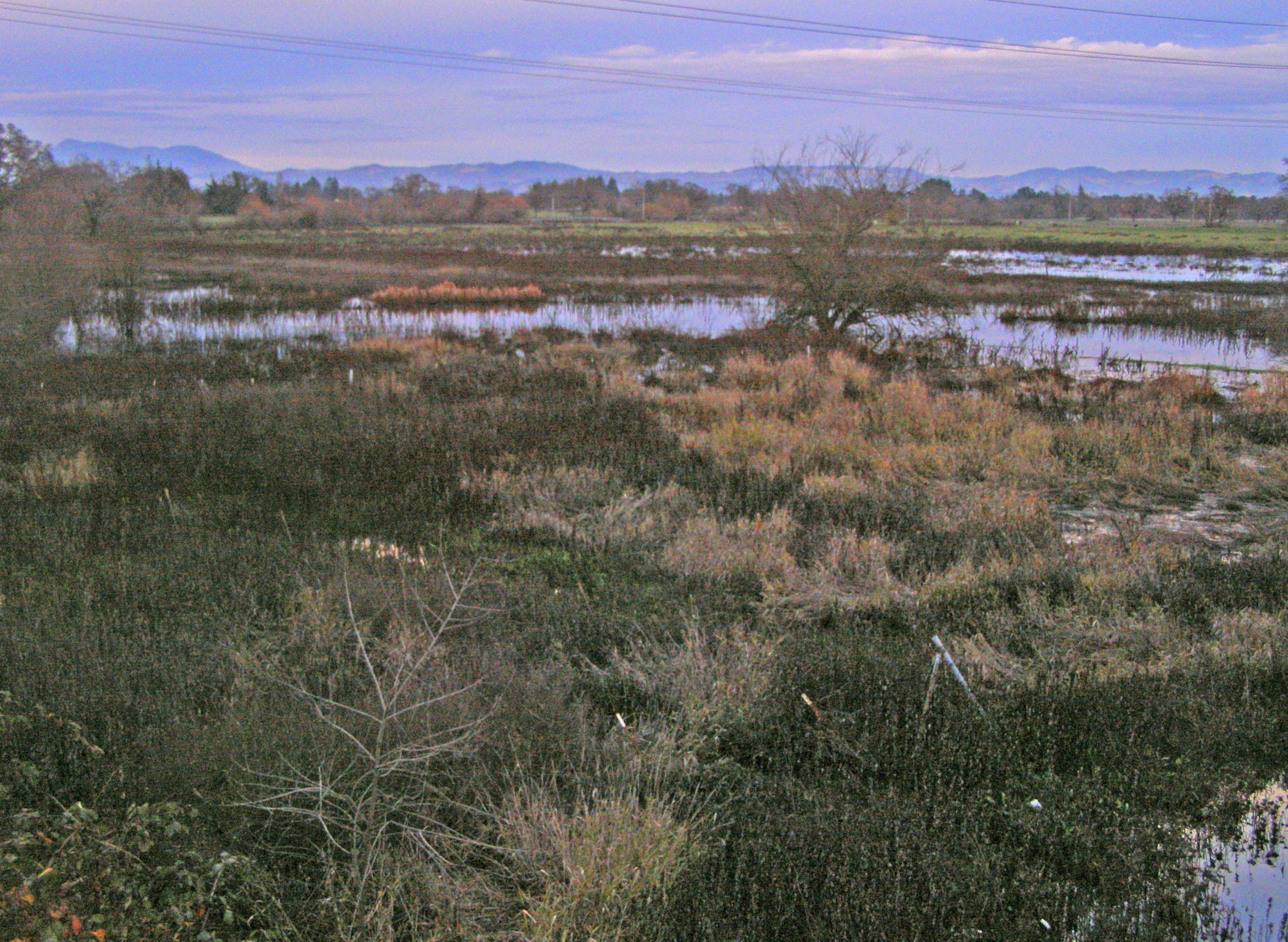
Laguna de Santa Rosa, the second largest wetland of Northern California and habitat of Syncaris pacifica

The precise historic distribution of Syncaris pacifica is not known, since geologic and climatic changes since the early Quaternary Period have significantly altered river courses of the Northern California coast. Historically, Syncaris pacifica may have occurred as far north as the Klamath River, but reductions of habitat, especially from overgrazing of cattle, along with chemical water pollution has greatly diminished the present range to 17 stream segments in Sonoma, Napa and Marin Counties, with the largest population currently being in Salmon Creek, Sonoma. These habitat stream segments are sometimes separated by degraded portions of a given creek, effectively leading to a fragmented population. Occurrence is restricted to perennial streams below 100 meters above sea level in elevation and of gradient less than one percent. The stream segments can be grouped as follows:

- Certain stream segments which drain directly to the Pacific Ocean, including Tomales Bay, in Marin and Sonoma Counties
- Sonoma Creek, lower Napa River, Tolay Creek and Petaluma River, all of which drain to the San Pablo Bay
- Certain lower tributaries of the Russian River including the Laguna de Santa Rosa and certain of its tributaries such as Blucher Creek

== Habitat and behavior ==
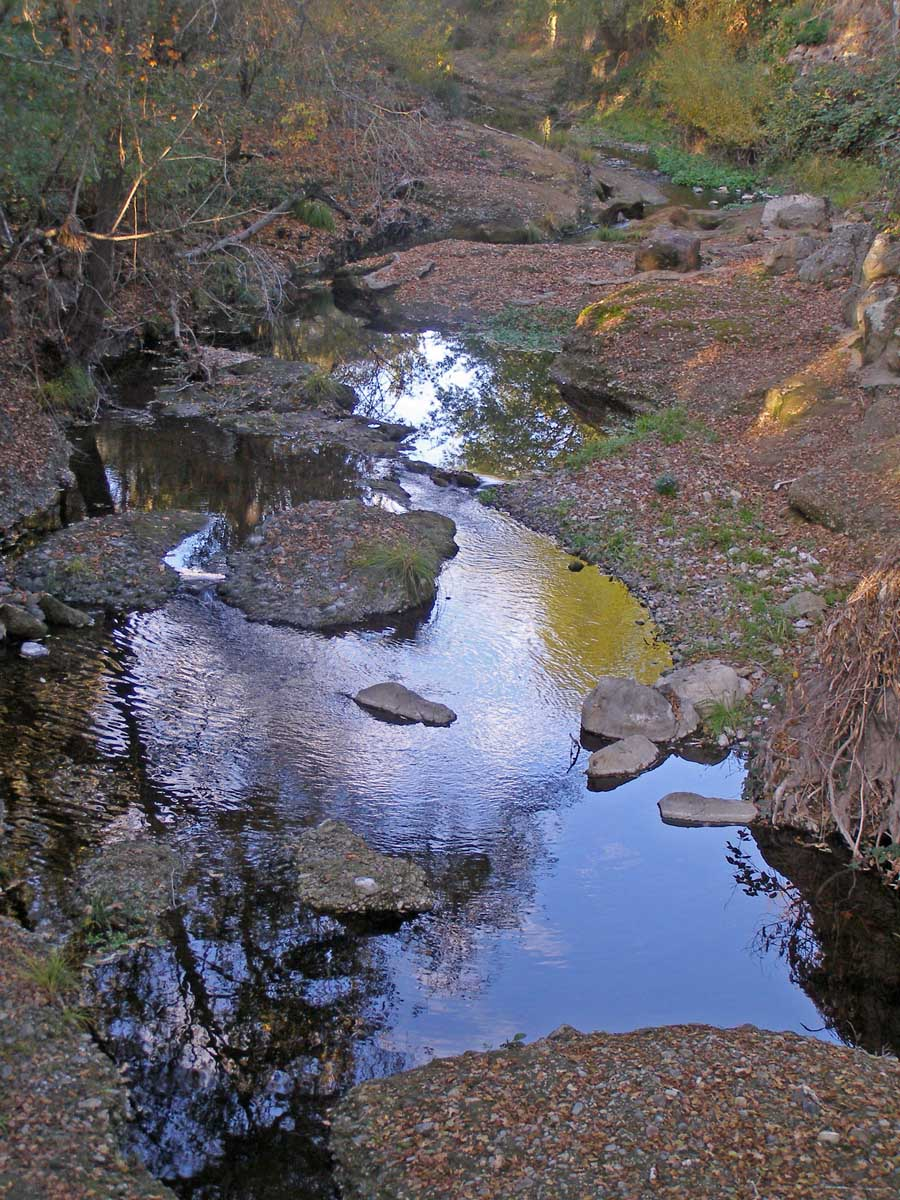
Sonoma Creek, a habitat of Syncaris pacifica

California freshwater shrimp prefer streams that have water flowing year round with predominately low gradient flows. In the summer months with little precipitation and surface runoff the flow rates can be very low with larger pools but they characteristically transport heavy runoff during the rainy winter season. Within a given stream, S. pacifica prefers slow- to medium-flowing pools and glide areas with overhanging banks. They do not inhabit even slightly brackish stream segments, but have been found to survive a minimum of 13 days in 50% seawater, perhaps allowing seed populations to colonize nearby streams as was possibly seen in Olema Creek.

As a slow moving species S. pacifica are usually found attached and feeding decomposing vegetation and other detritus, consuming minute diverse particles conveyed by currents to downstream pools. As the water slows, the particles are filtered by the fine network of exposed roots from trees, such as from willows and alders. The California freshwater shrimp merely brush up the food with tufts at the tips of their small claws, and lift to their mouths the collected morsels. Colonized by algae, bacteria, fungi, and microscopic animals, the particle agglomerates are quite nutritious. Although most species of shrimp walk slowly about the roots as they feed, S. pacifica will undertake short swimming bursts to obtain particularly desirable items.

Breeding occurs once per annum during the autumn. Adults attain sexual maturity by the end of their second summer. A female can be expected to generate approximately 50 to 120 eggs per breeding season, which remain attached to the mother for the entire winter (most common in December and January). Studies on other family members suggest a lifespan for this species of several years.

== Conservation ==
Syncaris pacifica is a federally listed endangered species, protected under the Endangered Species Act of 1973 since its initial listing in 1988. Conservation priorities for S. pacifica and associated native aquatic species include:

- Protect and manage S. pacifica populations and habitat once the threats are removed and restoration has been completed
- Monitor and evaluate S. pacifica habitat conditions and populations
- Assess effectiveness of various conservation efforts
- Conduct research on the biology of the species
- Restore and maintain viable S. pacifica populations at extirpated locations
- Increase public awareness and involvement in the protection of S. pacifica and native cohabiting species
- Assess effects of various conservation efforts on cohabiting native species
- Assemble an S. pacifica recovery team

There are individual efforts occurring in various stream segments, one of the most notable being Students and Teachers Restoring A Watershed (STRAW), a grassroots conservation program to restore over 1,400 meters (4,600 ft) of Stemple Creek by students at Brookside School in Marin County. In this case students raised money, lobbied legislators and succeeded in obtaining grant funds to prevent cattle grazing within the creek, one of the greatest habitat threats.

Although a new location of Syncaris pacifica was found in the 1990s at Olema Creek, during a survey, very few S. pacifica were found. All organisms that were captured during this survey were within 1km of the mouth of the river, suggesting that colonization downstream created unfavorable conditions for the species. 1999 surveys in Marin County found fewer individuals present than a comparable 1997 survey. Suggesting the general trend for the population of this organism is decline.

== See also ==
- Endangered arthropod
- Miwok
