= Freestone, California =

Unincorporated community in California, United States

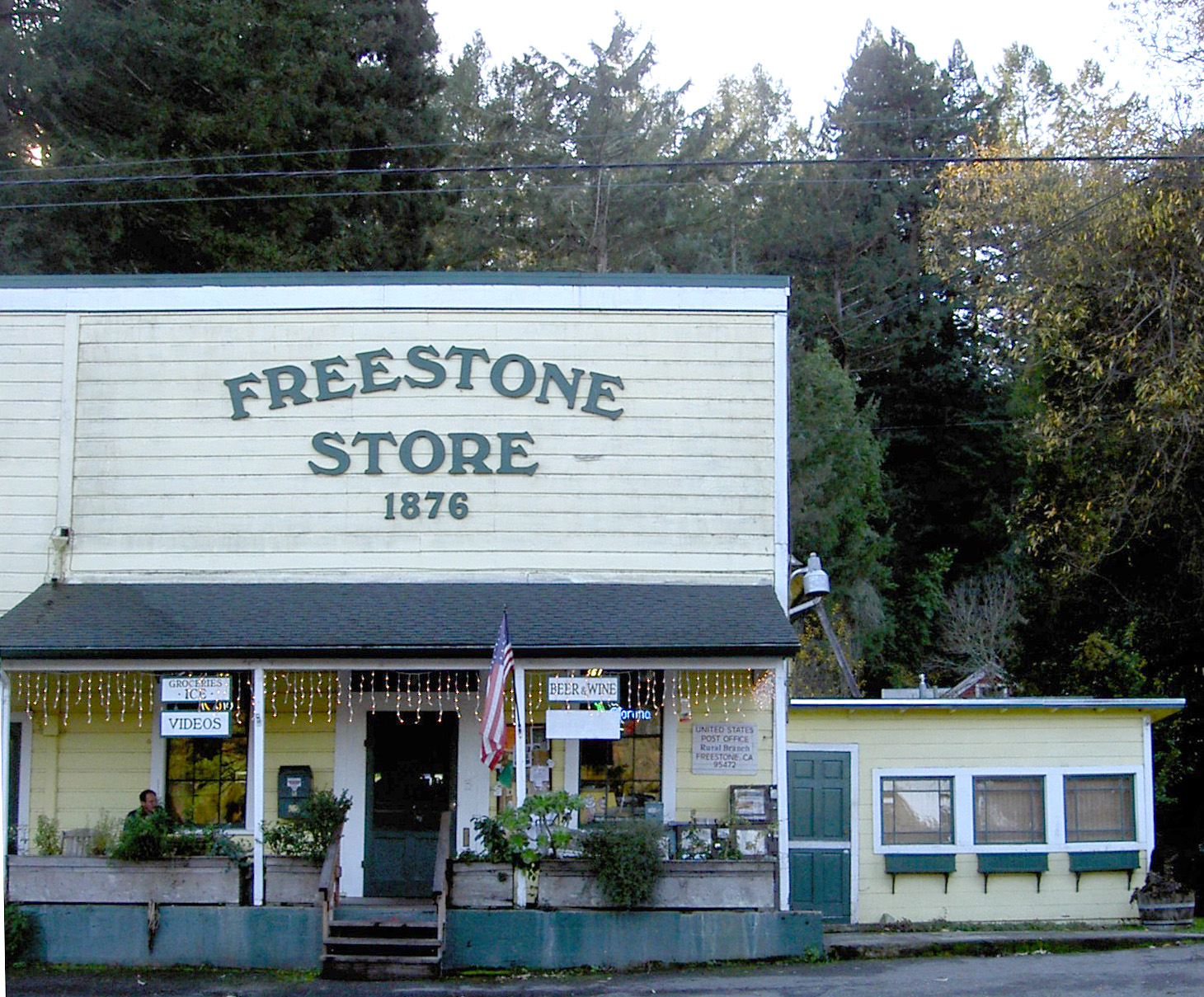
- The Freestone general store as of 2007.

- Location within the state of California
- Coordinates: 38°22′21″N 122°54′56″W
- Country: United States
- State: California
- County: Sonoma
- Elevation: 220 ft (67 m)
- Time zone: UTC-8 (PST)
  - Summer (DST): UTC-7 (PDT)
- ZIP code: 95472
- Area code: 707
- FIPS code: 06-25618
- GNIS feature ID: 1658578

Freestone is an unincorporated community in Sonoma County, California, United States. A former stone and logging town, Freestone is the gateway to the Bohemian Highway. In 1974, Freestone became the first historic district named by Sonoma County. The downtown comprises a handful of historic buildings with a selection of local businesses, including a cheese shop, winery, bakery, and a day spa. Freestone has a population of 32.

== History ==
Freestone is named after a sandstone quarry that was developed in the area around 1861. The area once consisted of three ranchos: Rancho Cañada de Jonive, Rancho Estero Americano, and Rancho Cañada de Pogolimi. The area was split into three ranchos as the result of a dispute between three early settlers, James McIntosh, James Black, and James Dawson. The three men were allowed to settle on the land by Mariano Guadalupe Vallejo in the 1830s, where they built a saw mill. Eventually the three men left the area.

Jasper O'Farrell moved into the area in 1849, after exchanging Nicasio Rancho for Rancho Cañada de Jonive. He eventually purchased Rancho Estero Americano. A land surveyor, O'Farrell surveyed the surrounding area, which he called Analy Township. O'Farrell found success in the area, acquiring a total of 560 acres of land. He was elected to the California State Senate in 1859. Within a year he had to sell his land and in 1870 he moved back to San Francisco.

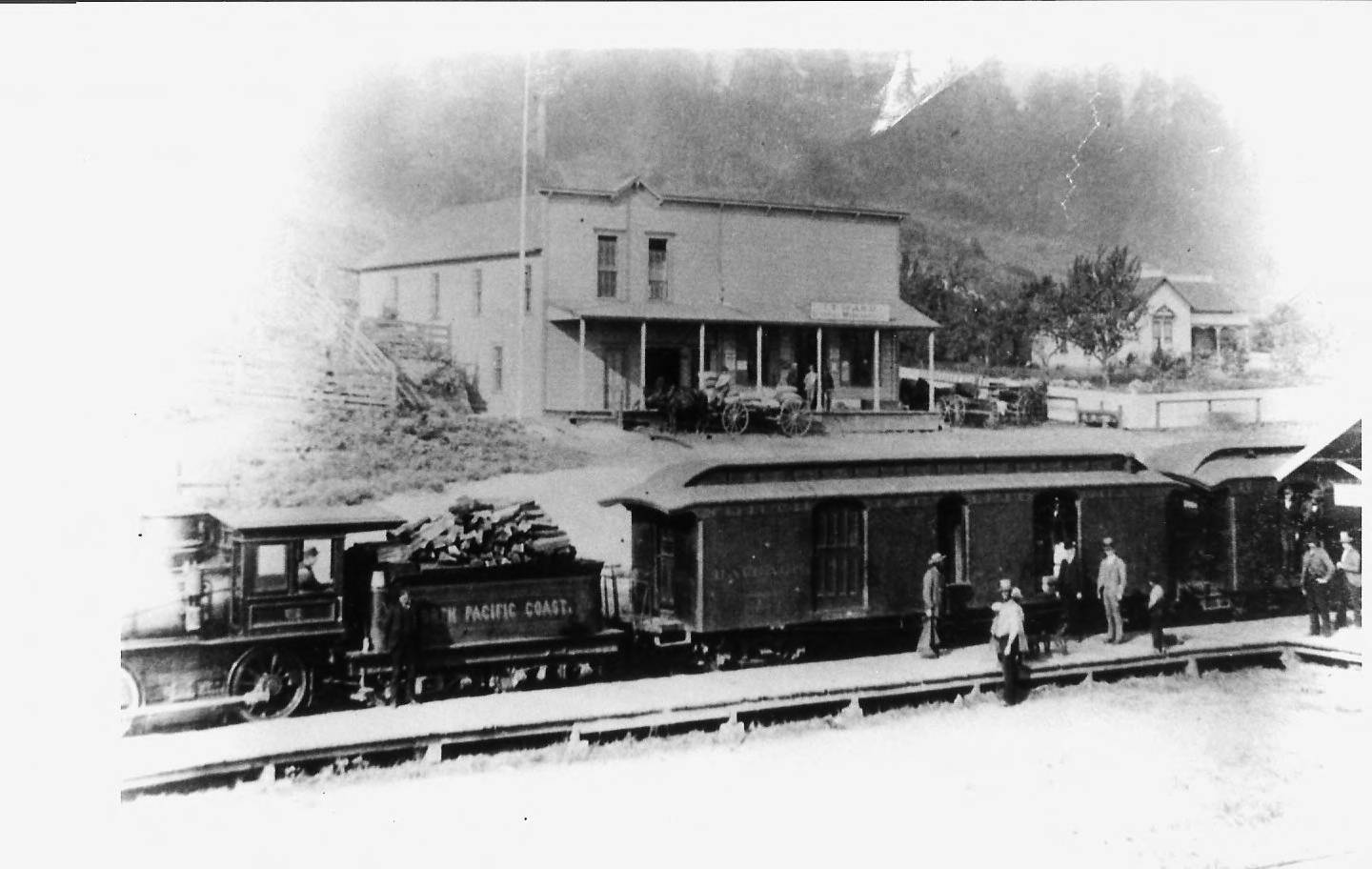
North Pacific Coast Railroad train in Freestone, 1893

Freestone had a saloon by 1849, followed by a general store the next year. Freestone became a stop on a new stagecoach line in 1853. That same year, an inn was built as well as two blacksmith shops. The inn burned down in 1861. A depot for the North Pacific Coast Railroad was built in Freestone, with the train starting to stop in the village in September 1876. A second inn, the Hinds Hotel was built by the depot in August, just prior to the train stop opening. The railroad transported lumber and produce to and from San Francisco. In 1930, the railroad stopped operating due to the growing popularity of cars and trucks.

The first school was built in Freestone by the 1880s, which was used for schooling until 1958. In 1881, the first church was built in Freestone, a Methodist church. That church was eventually destroyed and a second church was built in 1907, only to be demolished in the 1960s. The town had a post office by the 1880s. The end of the railroad service to Freestone is considered the end of "the era of development and prosperity" historically.

In 1974, Freestone was deemed a historic district by the County of Sonoma, making it the first historic landmark designated by the County. The district comprises 30 properties, consisting mainly of residential and commercial buildings in the Greek Revival, Italianate and Queen Anne architectural styles. The Hind's Hotel was designated Landmark #2 in the County that same year, followed by the now-demolished Morgan Williams Residence, and the remaining Freestone Schoolhouse and Freestone Country Store.

== Economy ==
Historically, Freestone was first a lumber town, with a saw mill on the Salmon Creek. Eventually, a sandstone quarry was operated in the area. Railroad service eventually began, transporting lumber and produce to San Francisco. The railroad depot closed in 1930, halting economic growth in Freestone. Today, the economy is primarily hospitality based.

=== Tourism ===
Freestone comprises a handful of businesses, including a bakery, cheese store, general store, a gift shop, and a spa.
