= Two Rock, California =

Unincorporated community in California, United States

- unincorporated community
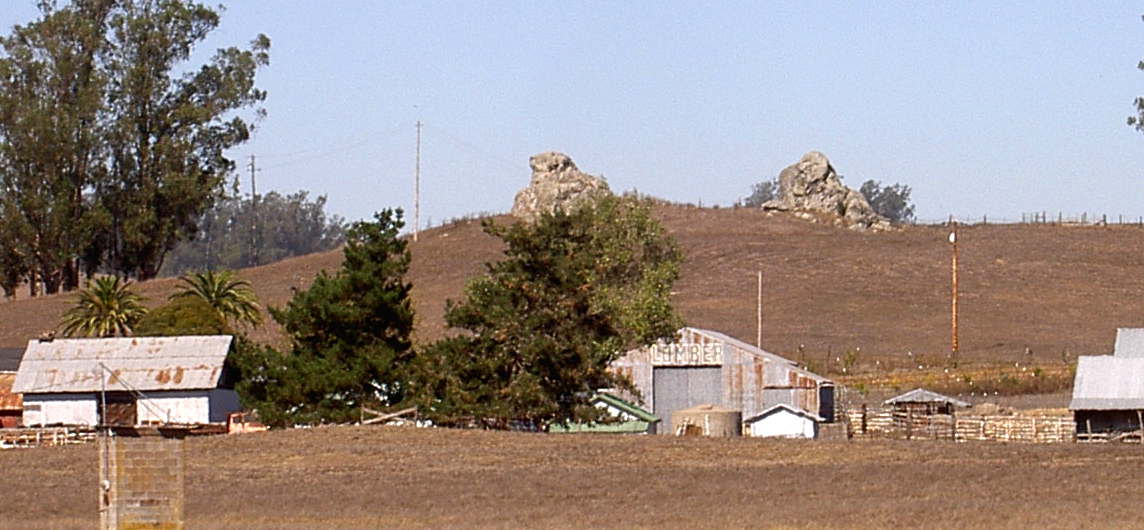
- Two Rock and Dos Piedras in 2008

- Location within the state of California
- Coordinates: 38°15′59″N 122°47′32″W
- Country: United States
- State: California
- County: Sonoma
- Elevation: 82 ft (25 m)
- Time zone: UTC−8 (Pacific)
  - Summer (DST): UTC−7 (PDT)
- ZIP code: 94952
- Area code: 707
- FIPS code: 06-81108
- GNIS feature ID: 1660064

Two Rock is an unincorporated community in Sonoma County, California, United States. It is located on Stemple Creek in a rural area west of Petaluma. A hill named Dos Piedras (Spanish for "two rocks", 157 feet (48 m) above sea level) overlooks the community from the north. The community is named for the two rocks, a landmark for the ancient Native American trail to the Sierras shared by the Washoe, Pomo, and Coast Miwok tribes. Two Rock had a fire department, a post office located at the intersection of Bloomfield and Tomales Road, as well as a school 1.3 miles west of the former post office, on Tomales Road. A new school has since been built further east, but the original school building still stands. The principal of Two Rock Union School from 1963-1978, Helen Putnam, became mayor of Petaluma, California in 1965.

The main road is Valley Ford Road, which passes northwest–southeast through Two Rock. The Coast Guard's Training Center Petaluma is located just south of Two Rock. Two Rock used to provide basic services to local ranches, but little remains today.

The Mexican Empire under General Vallejo established the Dos Piedras settlement as a military outpost making Americano Creek the bulwark to Russia's Fort Ross, Russian River, Sebastopol and Bodega Bay claims in Northern California .

Dos Piedras marked the corners of the Blucher and Balsa de Tomales ranchos. The trail from San Rafael to Bodega and Ross passed between the two rocks. Early Sonoma County historian Robert A. Thompson said, "It was the custom among the Indians in the back country to take two or three journeys each year [along the path] to the coast for the purpose of feasting on shell-fish, and gathering shells for the manufacture of Indian money."
