= Rancho Cañada de Herrera =

Mexican land grant in California

Coordinates: 38.020°N 122.600°W

Rancho Cañada de Herrera was a 6,658-acre (26.94 km^{2}) Mexican land grant in present-day Marin County, California given in 1839 by Governor pro tem Manuel Jimeno to Domingo Sais (also spelled Saens or Saez). The grant encompassed present day Fairfax, Sleepy Hollow and a part of San Anselmo.

== History ==
Domingo Sais (1806–1853), eldest of sixteen children of Juan Maria Sais and Maria Dominga Valenzuela, was a soldier at the Presidio of San Francisco (1826–1833) and a soldier in the San Francisco militia in 1837. Domingo Sais married Maria Manuela Miranda in 1830. In 1839, Sais was granted the one and a half square league Rancho Cañada de Herrera in return for his military service.

With the cession of California to the United States following the Mexican-American War, the 1848 Treaty of Guadalupe Hidalgo provided that the land grants would be honored. As required by the Land Act of 1851, a claim for Rancho Cañada de Herrera was filed with the Public Land Commission in 1852, and the grant was patented to Domingo Sais in 1876.

When Domingo Sais died in 1853, the rancho was divided amongst his heirs. James Black, grantee of Rancho Cañada de Jonive, and married to Maria Agustina Sais (1828–1864), sister of Domingo Sais, bought part of the rancho. Black's daughter, Mary, married Dr. Galen Burdell. Black's wife, Maria Agustina Sais, died in Dr. Burdell's dental chair in 1864. In 1866 Black married Maria Loreto Duarte, Ygnacio Pacheco's widow. James Black died in 1870.

== See also ==
- Ranchos of California
- List of Ranchos of California
