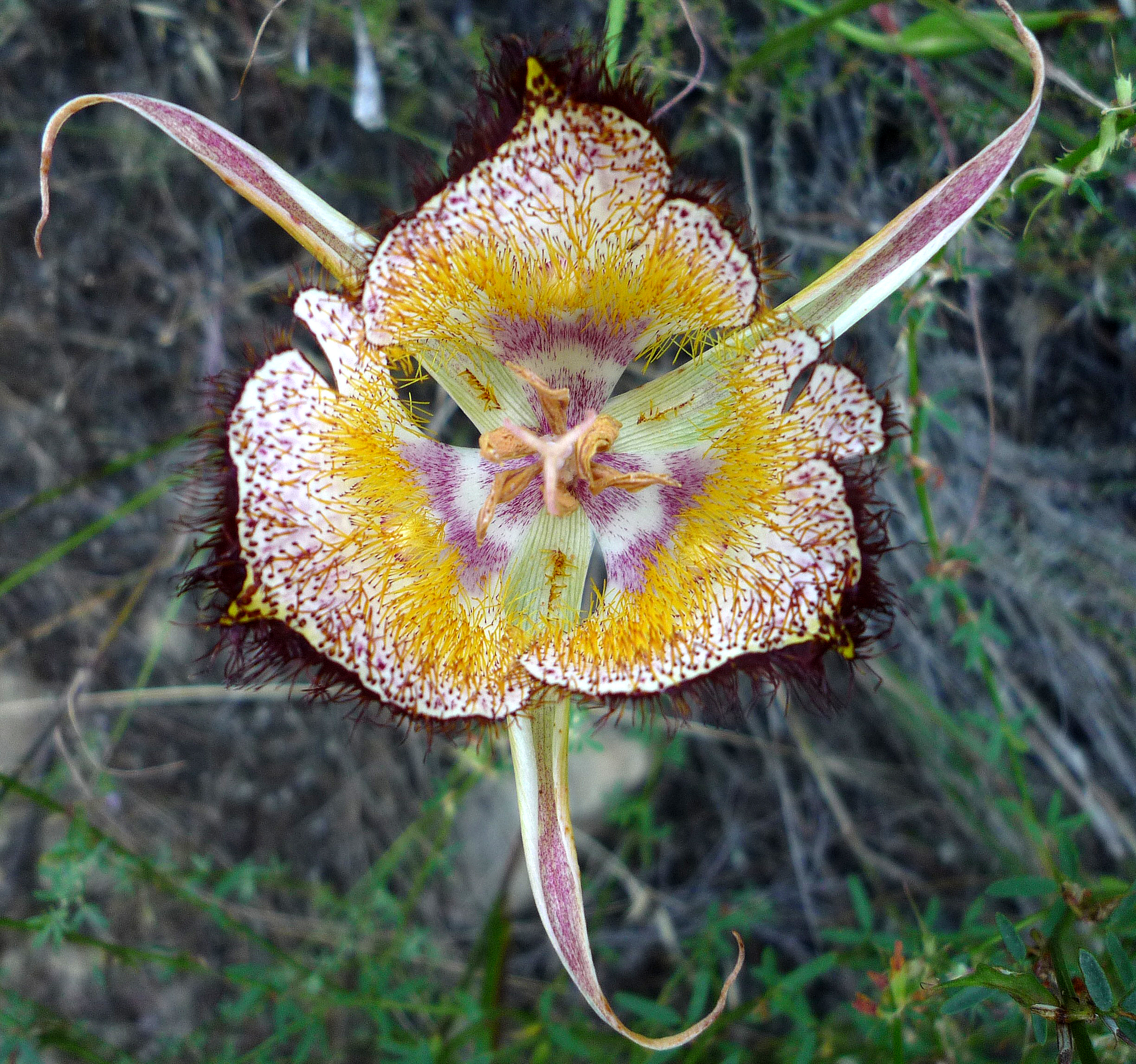

Conservation status
- Vulnerable (NatureServe)

Scientific classification
- Kingdom: Plantae
- Clade: Tracheophytes
- Clade: Angiosperms
- Clade: Monocots
- Order: Liliales
- Family: Liliaceae
- Genus: Calochortus
- Species: C. fimbriatus

Binomial name
- Calochortus fimbriatus H.P.McDonald

Synonyms
- Calochortus weedii var. purpurascens S.Watson; Calochortus weedii var. vestus Purdy; Cyclobothra vesta (Purdy) Hoover 1966, not Calochortus vestae (Purdy) Wallace 1894

= Calochortus fimbriatus =

Species of flowering plant

Calochortus fimbriatus is a California species of flowering plant in the lily family known by the common name late-blooming mariposa lily. It is native to the coastal mountain ranges of southern Monterey, San Luis Obispo, Santa Barbara and northern Ventura counties, where it is a member of the chaparral flora.

This species is listed as "rare, threatened or endangered in California and elsewhere" and "fairly endangered in California" (CNPS: 1B.2).

== Description ==
Calochortus fimbriatus is a bulb-forming perennial herb producing a slender, branching stem 30 to 110 centimeters tall. There is a basal leaf up to 40 centimeters long which appears in January and withers long before the plant blooms in late June or early July. The bloom continues until mid-August. The inflorescence consists of 2 to 6 erect, bowl-shaped flowers. Each flower has three narrow sepals and three wider petals. The petals are usually tan or cream colored on the outside and yellowish on the inside with variable number of flecks of dark purple, and a coating of hairs on the inner surface and top rim. The fruit is a three-angled capsule. Calochortus fimbriatus blooms more vigorously the year after a wildfire.

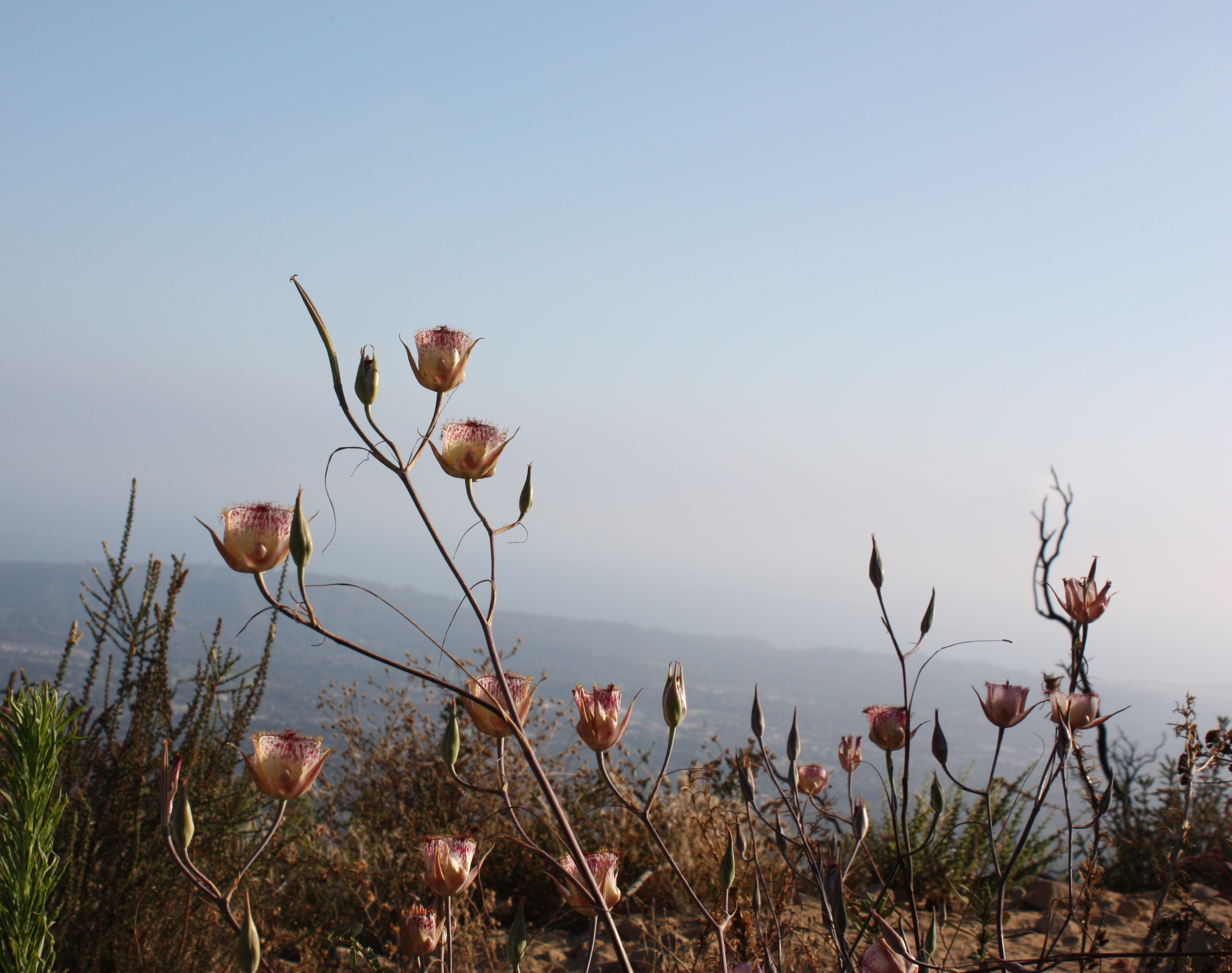
Inflorescence

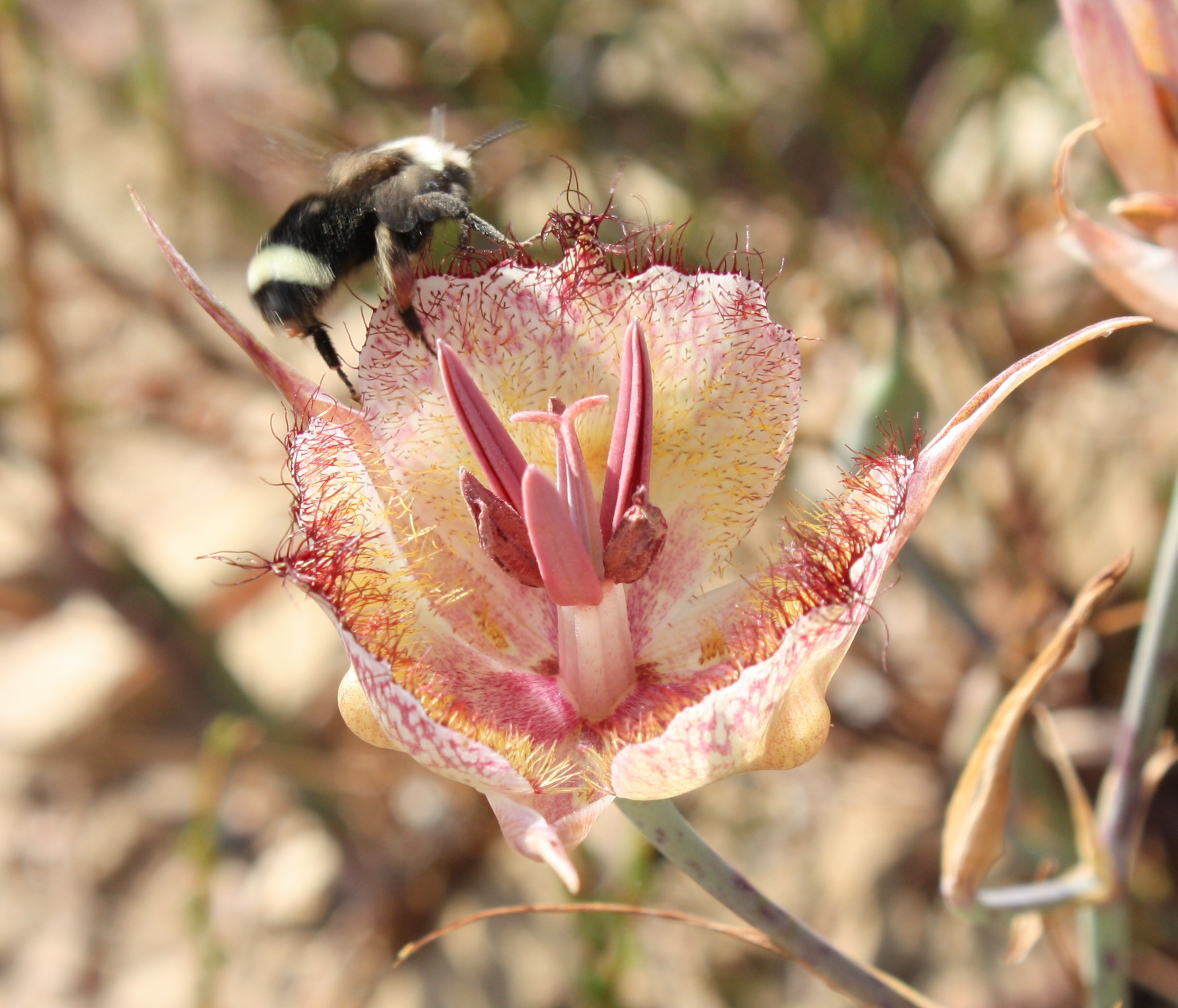
Flower with bumblebee
