= Americano Creek =

Stream in California

Americano Creek Avacha River, Estero Americano
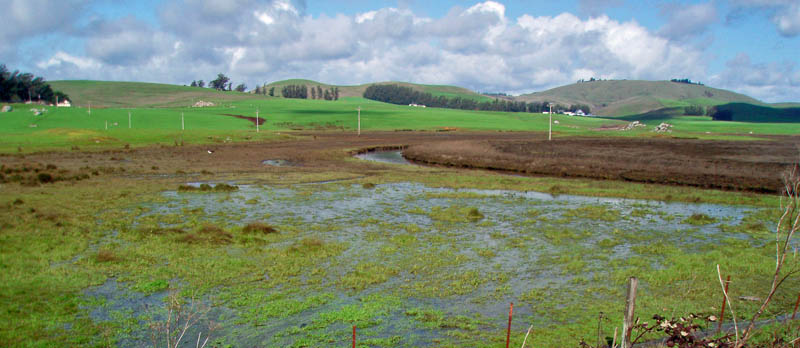
- Upper reach of Americano Creek

- Location of the mouth of Americano Creek in California
- Etymology: Spanish

Location
- Country: United States
- State: California
- Region: Sonoma County
- City: Bloomfield, California

Physical characteristics
- Source
  - location: 4 mi (6 km) west of Cotati, California
  - coordinates: 38°19′18″N 122°46′58″W
  - elevation: 265 ft (81 m)
- Mouth: Estero Americano (below)
  - location: 1 mi (1.6 km) east of Valley Ford, California
  - coordinates: 38°19′0″N 122°54′0″W
  - elevation: 20 ft (6.1 m)
- Length: 7.5 mi (12.1 km)

Estero Americano
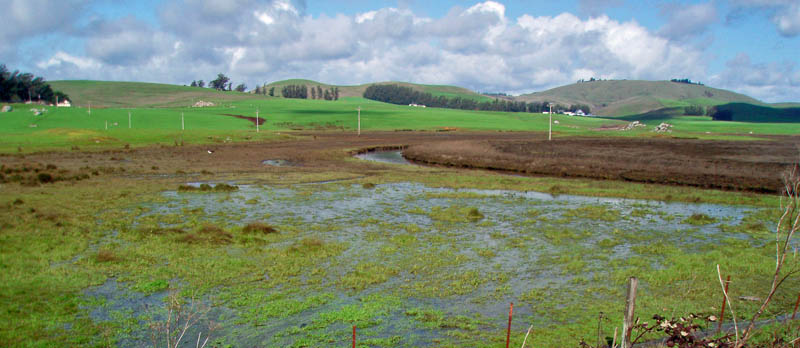
- Etymology: Spanish

Location
- Country: United States
- State: California
- Region: Sonoma and Marin counties
- City: Valley Ford, California

Physical characteristics
- Source: Americano Creek (above)
  - location: 1 mi (1.6 km) east of Valley Ford, California
  - coordinates: 38°19′0″N 122°53′56″W
  - elevation: 20 ft (6.1 m)
- Mouth: Bodega Bay
  - location: 3 mi (5 km) southeast of Bodega Bay, California
  - coordinates: 38°17′44″N 123°0′9″W
  - elevation: 0 ft (0 m)
- Length: 9.2 mi (14.8 km)
- Basin size: 49 mi^{2} (130 km^{2})

Basin features
- Tributaries
  - right: Ebabias Creek

Americano Creek is a 7.5-mile (12 km) long westward-flowing stream in the California counties of Sonoma and Marin. It flows into the Estero Americano, a 9.2 mi (15 km) long estuary, and thence to the Pacific Ocean. This article covers both watercourses.

== Course ==
Americano Creek springs from low-lying coastal hills 4 mi (6 km) west of Cotati and runs westward, paralleling Roblar Road. It passes a closed landfill and crosses the Valley Ford Road. At this point the channel becomes better defined and also deep enough for kayaking during the winter months. Kayakers access the creek here by means of an unpaved boat launch road that is reachable from Marsh Road.

The lower reach of the creek flows westward past the small community of Bloomfield, paralleling Valley Ford Road, and passes under State Route 1, known locally as "Highway 1" or "the Shoreline Highway", at which point it begins to define the Sonoma-Marin county line.

Just west of the highway, the watercourse's official name changes to Estero Americano. It meanders past the town of Valley Ford. Valley Ford-Franklin School Road crosses at the last bridge across the estero. Shortly thereafter, Ebabias Creek enters from the north. The last 6 mi (10 km) of the estero are virtually without road access or visibility from public roads.

The estero continues to define the county boundary until it reaches the coast, where it empties into Bodega Bay about 4 mi (6 km) southeast of the town of Bodega Bay. Its mouth lies near the north end of the Gulf of the Farallones National Marine Sanctuary.

== Environmental factors ==
California's 1994 water quality report designated all of Americano Creek and most of the Estero Americano as "impaired" streamways as defined in section 303(d) of the Federal Water Resource Statutes, due to runoff from pasture land and feedlots. As recently as 1987, a single gully near Americano Creek released 4,000 tons/year of sediment, contributing to flooding in downstream communities and making the creek non-navigable. Pollutants found at hazardous level in the creek have included fecal bacteria, copper, ammonia, and zinc.

The creek's headwaters area is a historic habitat for a number of rare and endangered species including Sebastopol meadowfoam, Limnanthes vinculans; showy Indian clover, Trifolium amoenum; and Pitkin Marsh lily, Lilium pardolinum ssp pitkinese. This area also contains a closed landfill, and as of 2006, a hard rock quarry was proposed for it.

Americano Creek is dry 4 to 6 months each year. For its first 8 mi (13 km), the stream meanders through a broad valley dominated by agricultural uses, principally cattle grazing. The valley floor is flat and wide, especially at the lower elevations. Due to siltation, virtually no rocks are evident in the streambed. Grazing occurs in the streambed itself, putting pathogens directly into the water. During the rainy season (November to April), this bottomland consists in places of an expansive marshy area. Most native wetland vegetation has been destroyed by ongoing grazing. Grazing is so intense that cattle are seen wading in a broad marshy streambed over 16 in (40 cm) deep and over 300 ft (100 m) wide.

The lower reach of Americano Creek is also surrounded by agricultural uses. However, the channel becomes better separated from grazing areas. The estero itself is a federally protected area.

Flow rates are highly seasonal with the heaviest flows occurring in the rainy winter months. Water testing of Americano Creek and Estero has generally found pH (acidity) levels in the range of 7.5 to 8.0, which satisfies the guidelines in the State of California Basin Plan.

In some years, a sand bar forms at the mouth of the estero, restricting tidal exchange. At other times, tidal influences extend up to 4 miles (6 km) from the mouth. High levels of salinity have been observed in the estero.

The Estero Americano is protected by the Estero Americano State Marine Recreational Management Area. Like an underwater park, this marine protected area helps conserve ocean wildlife and marine ecosystems.

== History ==
Two permanent Coast Miwok villages were located on the Estero Americano: one named Uli-yomi at the head of the estero, and another named Awachi at its mouth. The earliest Spanish maps show the creek and its estuary as Estero Americano. At the time of the Russian colony at Fort Ross, the Americano Creek was known as the Avacha River. To counter the Russian settlement General Vallejo sent three "Americanos", Edward McIntosh, James Black (1810–1870), and James Dawson, to settle just southeast of Bodega Bay. These three men came to California as sailors with Captain John B.R. Cooper, brother-in-law of General Vallejo. Black settled upon what is now known as Rancho Cañada de Jonive, while Dawson and McIntosh settled upon Rancho Estero Americano. Rancho Cañada de Pogolimi was a Mexican land grant given in 1844 by Governor Manuel Micheltorena to María Antonia Cazares, widow of James Dawson.

The Ebabias Creek tributary is shown on a diseño of the Rancho Cañada de Pogolimi grant in 1844 but the possible Indian origin has not been determined.

== Bridges ==
Bridges cross Americano Creek in three locations: Gericke Road, Roblar Road and Valley Ford Road. The newest of these, built in 1985, is the 73 ft (22.3 m) long concrete slab structure at Valley Ford Road, 3.6 mi (5.8 km) east of the junction with State Route 1. The oldest of these, built in 1964, is the Roblar Road crossing, a 27 ft (8.2 m) concrete culvert situated 0.7 mi (1.1 km) east of Valley Ford Road. The Gericke Road bridge is a 107 ft (32.6 m) long concrete continuous slab built in 1972 about 0.2 mi (300 m) south of Valley Ford Road.

The Estero Americano is crossed in three places: Valley Ford-Franklin School Road, Highway One, and Slaughter House Road. All three crossing are concrete continuous slab structures. The State Route 1 bridge, built in 1925, is 144 ft (43.9 m) long and located near milepost 50.47. The Valley Ford-Franklin School bridge, built in 1961, is 198 ft (60.4 m) long. The Slaughter House Road bridge, built in 1990, is only 75 ft (22.9 m) long.

== See also ==
- Estero Americano State Marine Recreational Management Area
- List of watercourses in the San Francisco Bay Area
- Overgrazing
- Water pollution
