= Sonoma County Board of Supervisors =

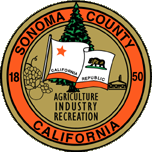

Type
- Type: Unicameral
- Term limits: None

Leadership
- Chair: Chris Coursey
- Vice Chair: David Rabbitt
- Chair Pro Tem: Lynda Hopkins

Structure
- Seats: 5
- Political groups: Officially nonpartisan Democratic Party (5)
- Length of term: 4 years

Elections
- Voting system: Instant runoff voting Single-member districts
- Last election: March 5, 2024
- Next election: 2026

Meeting place
- 575 Administration Drive, Room 102A; Santa Rosa, California

Website
- Sonoma County Board of Supervisors

The Sonoma County Board of Supervisors is a governing body with jurisdiction over Sonoma County, California. Among other things, the Board is responsible for managing Sonoma Water, the Northern Sonoma County Air Pollution Control District, the Agricultural Preservation and Open Space District, County Sanitation Districts, and the Community Development Commission.

== Background ==
The board is composed of five supervisors, each elected to serve four-year terms. Members of the Sonoma County Board of Supervisors receive a salary of $160,958 per year.

The current chair of the Board of Supervisors is Lynda Hopkins, who represents District 5, and was elected by her colleagues on the Board.

== Districts ==
District	Supervisor	Neighborhoods and areas represented
1	Rebecca Hermosillo	Santa Rosa (Bennett Valley, Rincon Valley and the community of Oakmont), City of Sonoma, Kenwood, Agua Caliente, Glen Ellen, El Verano, Boyes Hot Springs, Schellville and Vineburg
2	David Rabbitt	Petaluma, Cotati, a portion Rohnert Park, Penngrove, Two Rock and Bloomfield
3	Chris Coursey	Central Santa Rosa and Rohnert Park (east of Highway 101)
4	James Gore	Northwest City of Santa Rosa (Fulton and Larkfield-Wikiup area), Windsor, Healdsburg, Geyserville and the Cloverdale
5	Lynda Hopkins	Sonoma Coast, Russian River, Sebastopol, southwest Santa Rosa (west of Highway 101)
