= Salmon Creek, California =

Unincorporated community in California, United States

Salmon Creek
- census-designated place & unincorporated community
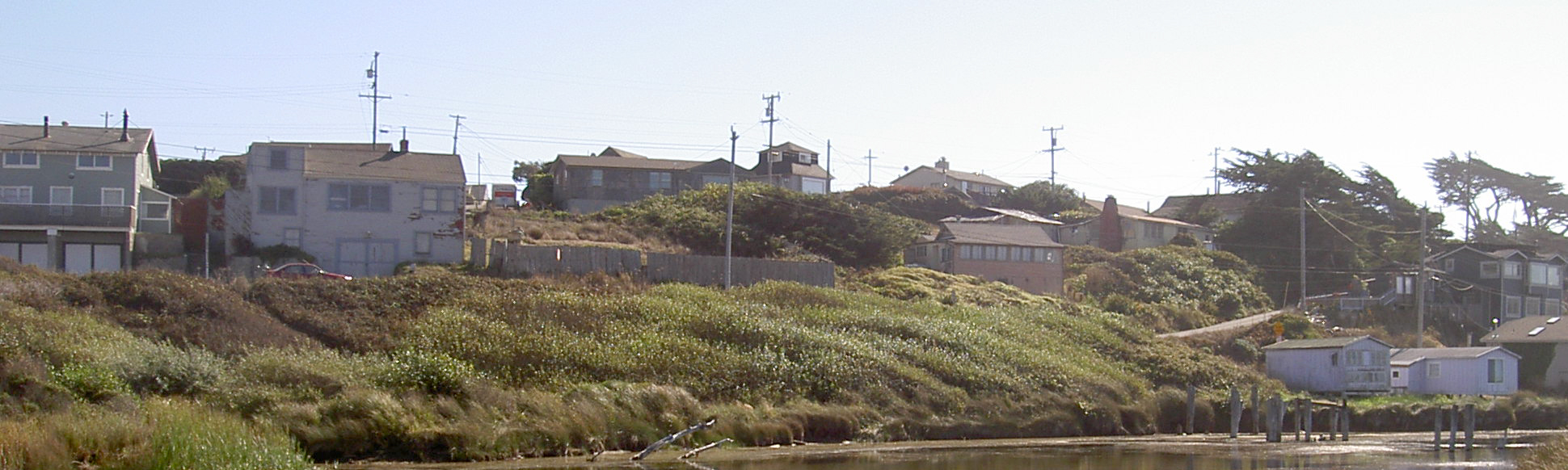
- houses in Salmon Creek

- Location within the state of California
- Coordinates: 38°21′2″N 123°3′44″W
- Country: United States
- State: California
- County: Sonoma
- Metro Area: San Francisco Bay Area

Area
  - Total: 1.114 sq mi (2.886 km^{2})
  - Land: 1.114 sq mi (2.886 km^{2})
  - Water: 0 sq mi (0 km^{2}) 0%
- Elevation: 46 ft (14 m)

Population (2020)
  - Total: 111
  - Density: 99.6/sq mi (38.5/km^{2})
- Time zone: UTC-8 (PST)
  - Summer (DST): UTC-7 (PDT)
- ZIP code: 94923
- Area code: 707
- FIPS code: 06-64252
- GNIS feature ID: 1659573

Salmon Creek is a settlement and census-designated place (CDP) in Sonoma County, California, United States. It is located on the Pacific coast approximately 90 minutes' drive north of San Francisco, between the towns of Jenner and Bodega Bay. The population was 111 at the 2020 census.

The settlement is bounded to the north by Salmon Creek, to the east by State Route 1 and to the west and south by Sonoma Coast State Beach.

== History ==
The Coast Miwok village of Pulya-lakum was formerly located near the mouth of Salmon Creek. In 1812, the Russian-American Company established Fort Ross about 12 miles (19 km) northwest of present-day Salmon Creek, bringing the area into the Russian Empire's sphere of influence.

== Geography ==
According to the United States Census Bureau, the CDP covers an area of 1.1 square miles (2.9 km^{2}), all land.

== Demographics ==
Historical population
Census	Pop.	Note	%±
2010	86		—
2020	111		29.1%
U.S. Decennial Census; 2010

Salmon Creek first appeared as a census designated place in the 2010 U.S. census.

=== Racial and ethnic composition ===
Salmon Creek CDP, California – Racial and ethnic composition Note: the US Census treats Hispanic/Latino as an ethnic category. This table excludes Latinos from the racial categories and assigns them to a separate category. Hispanics/Latinos may be of any race.
Race / Ethnicity (NH = Non-Hispanic)	Pop 2010	Pop 2020	% 2010	% 2020
White alone (NH)	85	77	98.84%	69.37%
Black or African American alone (NH)	0	1	0.00%	0.90%
Native American or Alaska Native alone (NH)	0	0	0.00%	0.00%
Asian alone (NH)	0	2	0.00%	1.80%
Native Hawaiian or Pacific Islander alone (NH)	0	0	0.00%	0.00%
Other race alone (NH)	0	7	0.00%	6.31%
Mixed race or Multiracial (NH)	0	6	0.00%	5.41%
Hispanic or Latino (any race)	1	18	1.16%	16.22%
Total	86	111	100.00%	100.00%

=== 2020 census ===
The 2020 United States census reported that Salmon Creek had a population of 111. The population density was 99.6 inhabitants per square mile (38.5/km^{2}). The racial makeup of Salmon Creek was 79 (71.2%) White, 1 (0.9%) African American, 0 (0.0%) Native American, 2 (1.8%) Asian, 0 (0.0%) Pacific Islander, 11 (9.9%) from other races, and 18 (16.2%) from two or more races. Hispanic or Latino of any race were 18 persons (16.2%).

The whole population lived in households. There were 47 households, out of which 4 (8.5%) had children under the age of 18 living in them, 18 (38.3%) were married-couple households, 4 (8.5%) were cohabiting couple households, 12 (25.5%) had a female householder with no partner present, and 13 (27.7%) had a male householder with no partner present. 18 households (38.3%) were one person, and 8 (17.0%) were one person aged 65 or older. The average household size was 2.36. There were 23 families (48.9% of all households).

The age distribution was 10 people (9.0%) under the age of 18, 6 people (5.4%) aged 18 to 24, 15 people (13.5%) aged 25 to 44, 36 people (32.4%) aged 45 to 64, and 44 people (39.6%) who were 65 years of age or older. The median age was 58.8 years. There were 57 males and 54 females.

There were 111 housing units at an average density of 99.6 units per square mile (38.5 units/km^{2}), of which 47 (42.3%) were occupied. Of these, 24 (51.1%) were owner-occupied, and 23 (48.9%) were occupied by renters.

== Education ==
Salmon Creek is served by the Shoreline Unified School District.
