= Bloomfield, California =

Bloomfield
- census-designated place
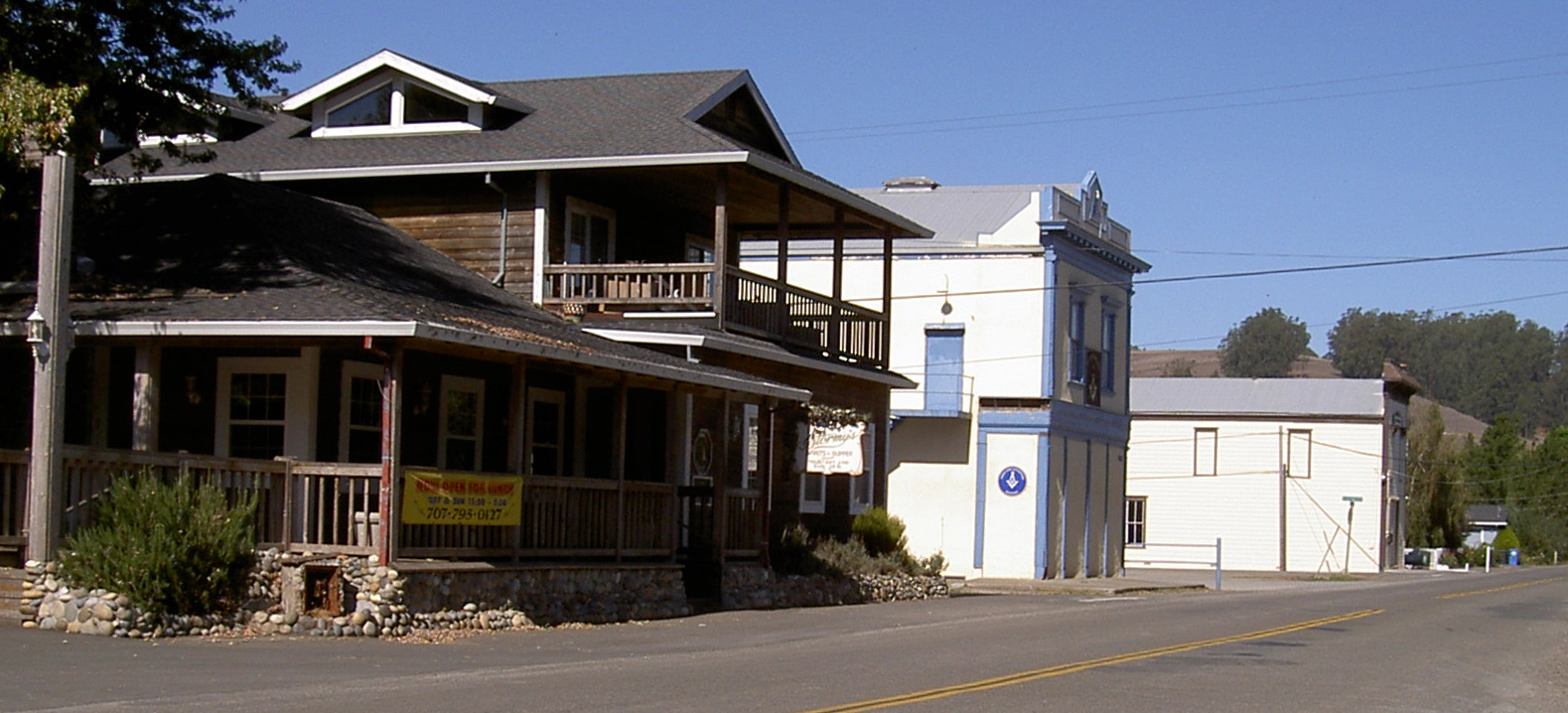
- Bloomfield in 2008: Stormy's Restaurant, masonic lodge, and town hall

- Location within the state of California
- Coordinates: 38°18′50″N 122°51′4″W
- Country: United States
- State: California
- County: Sonoma

Area
  - Total: 8.14 sq mi (21.09 km^{2})
  - Land: 8.14 sq mi (21.08 km^{2})
  - Water: 0.0077 sq mi (0.02 km^{2}) 0.08%
- Elevation: 56 ft (17 m)

Population (2020)
  - Total: 338
  - Density: 41.5/sq mi (16.04/km^{2})
- Time zone: UTC-8 (PST)
  - Summer (DST): UTC-7 (PDT)
- ZIP code: 94952
- Area code: 707
- FIPS code: 06-07036
- GNIS feature IDs: 1658081, 2582946

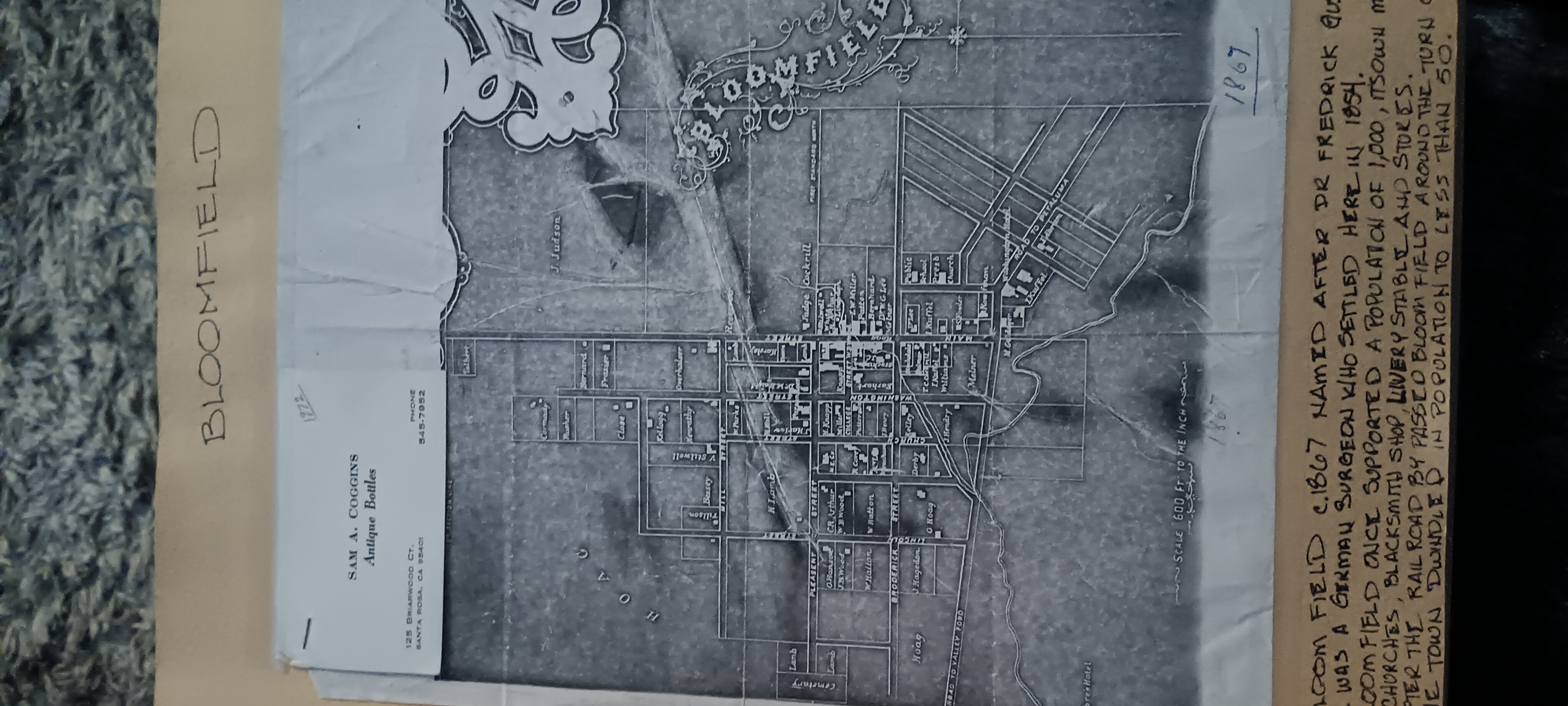

Bloomfield is a census-designated place in Sonoma County, California, United States. As of the 2020 census, Bloomfield had a population of 338. It is located in a rural area about 11 miles (18 km) southwest of Santa Rosa at the junction of Bloomfield Road and Valley Ford Road. Americano Creek flows westward along the south edge of the town.

== History ==
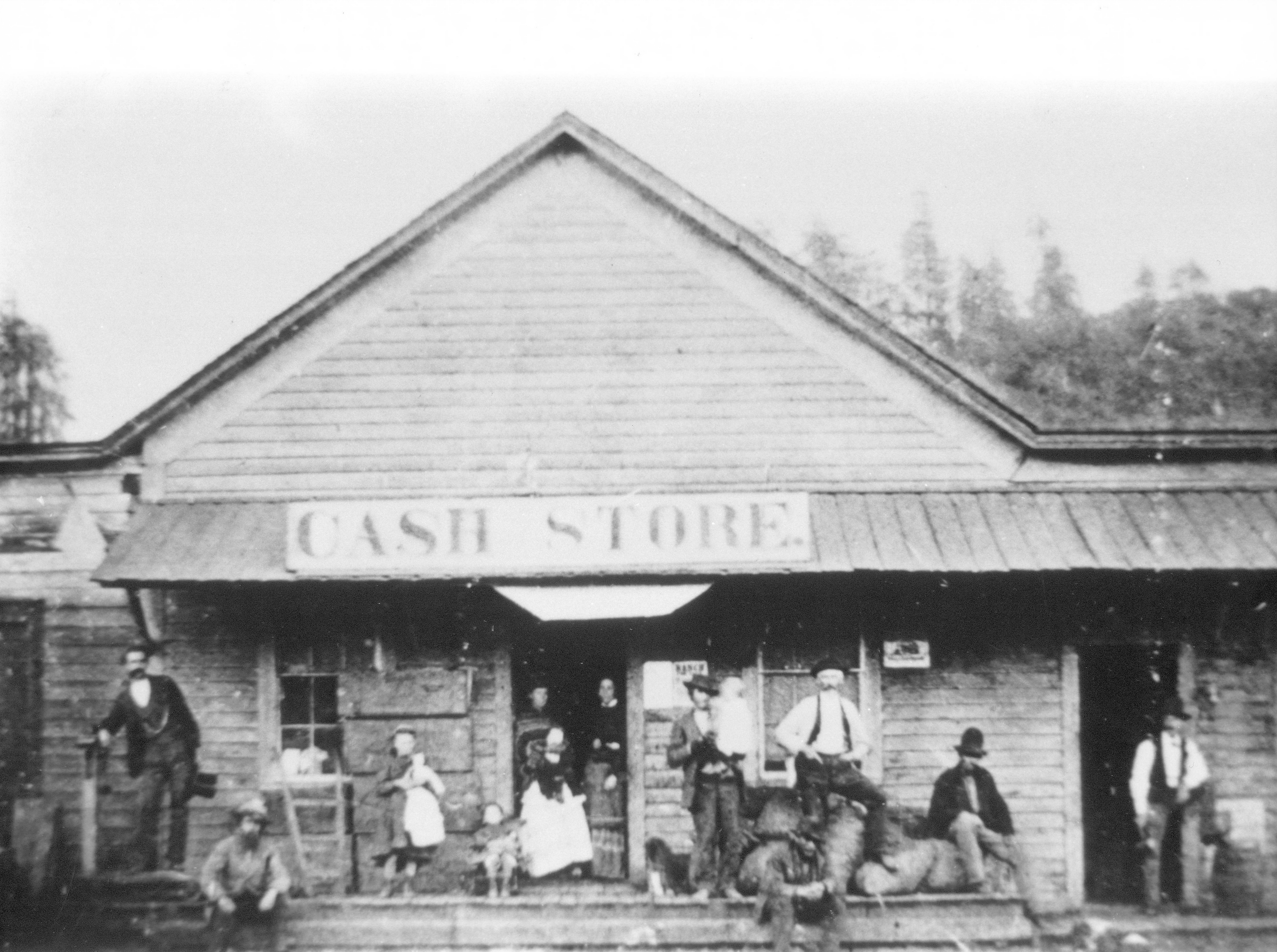
Cash store in Bloomfield, circa 1870

Bloomfield is located on part of Rancho Cañada de Pogolimi. In 1853, William Zellhardt built a house on the site of present-day Bloomfield, which attracted other immigrants and led to plans for a town in 1856. At one point in the late 1850s, Bloomfield was the second largest town in Sonoma County, and in 1877 it had four hotels and a population of 250. However, the town never recovered from being bypassed by the railroads, and its growth tapered off.

== Geography ==
According to the United States Census Bureau, the CDP covers an area of 8.1 square miles (21.1 km^{2}), of which 99.92% is land and 0.08% is water.

== Demographics ==
Historical population
Census	Pop.	Note	%±
2010	345		—
2020	338		−2.0%
U.S. Decennial Census; 1860–1870 1880-1890; 1900 1910 1920; 1930 1940 1950; 1960 1970 1980; 1990 2000 2010; 2020

Bloomfield first appeared as a census designated place in the 2010 U.S. census.

=== Racial and ethnic composition ===
Bloomfield CDP, California – Racial and ethnic composition Note: the US Census treats Hispanic/Latino as an ethnic category. This table excludes Latinos from the racial categories and assigns them to a separate category. Hispanics/Latinos may be of any race.
Race / Ethnicity (NH = Non-Hispanic)	Pop 2010	Pop 2020	% 2010	% 2020
White alone (NH)	270	278	78.26%	82.25%
Black or African American alone (NH)	0	0	0.00%	0.00%
Native American or Alaska Native alone (NH)	0	2	0.00%	0.59%
Asian alone (NH)	3	3	0.87%	0.89%
Native Hawaiian or Pacific Islander alone (NH)	0	0	0.00%	0.00%
Other race alone (NH)	5	2	1.45%	0.59%
Mixed race or Multiracial (NH)	5	8	1.45%	2.37%
Hispanic or Latino (any race)	62	45	17.97%	13.31%
Total	345	338	100.00%	100.00%

=== 2020 census ===
As of the 2020 census, Bloomfield had a population of 338. The population density was 41.5 inhabitants per square mile (16.0/km^{2}). The median age was 51.8 years. The age distribution was 46 people (13.6%) under the age of 18, 24 people (7.1%) aged 18 to 24, 80 people (23.7%) aged 25 to 44, 94 people (27.8%) aged 45 to 64, and 94 people (27.8%) who were 65 years of age or older. For every 100 females, there were 94.3 males, and for every 100 females age 18 and over there were 87.2 males age 18 and over.

0.0% of residents lived in urban areas, while 100.0% lived in rural areas.

There were 136 households in Bloomfield, of which 24.3% had children under the age of 18 living in them. Of all households, 51.5% were married-couple households, 10 (7.4%) were cohabiting couple households, 14.0% were households with a male householder and no spouse or partner present, and 27.2% were households with a female householder and no spouse or partner present. About 23.5% of all households were made up of individuals and 11.0% had someone living alone who was 65 years of age or older. The average household size was 2.49. There were 91 families (66.9% of all households).

There were 141 housing units at an average density of 17.3 units per square mile (6.7 units/km^{2}), of which 136 (96.5%) were occupied. Of the occupied units, 76 (55.9%) were owner-occupied and 60 (44.1%) were occupied by renters. The homeowner vacancy rate was 3.8% and the rental vacancy rate was 1.6%.

Racial composition as of the 2020 census
Race	Number	Percent
White	293	86.7%
Black or African American	2	0.6%
American Indian and Alaska Native	2	0.6%
Asian	4	1.2%
Native Hawaiian and Other Pacific Islander	0	0.0%
Some other race	17	5.0%
Two or more races	20	5.9%

== Education ==
Bloomfield is served by the Shoreline Unified School District.
