= Salmon Creek (Sonoma County, California) =

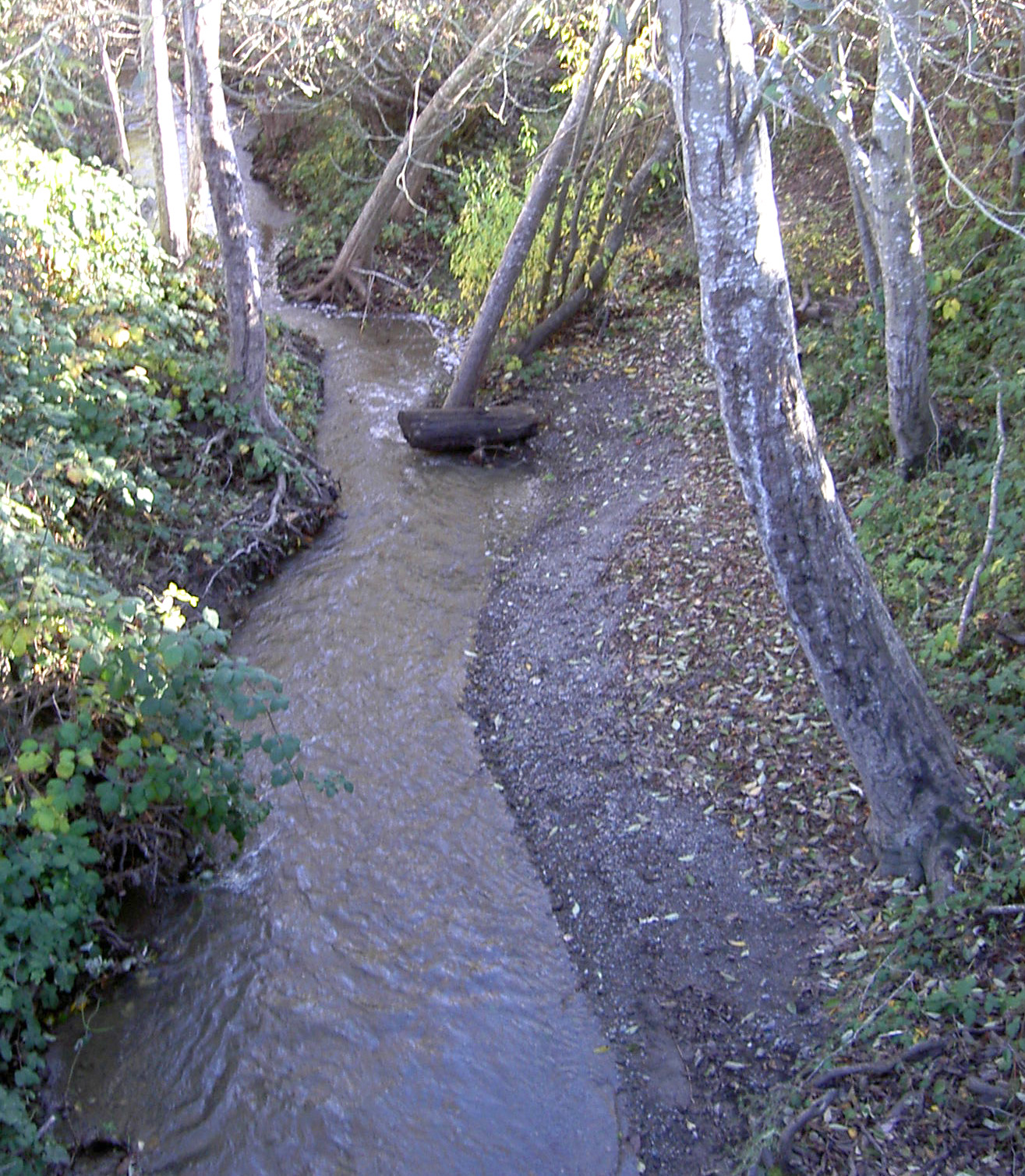
- Salmon Creek near Freestone, California

Location
- Country: United States
- State: California
- Region: Sonoma County
- Cities: Occidental, Freestone, Bodega, Salmon Creek

Physical characteristics
- Source
  - location: 2 mi (3 km) west of Occidental, California
  - coordinates: 38°23′34″N 122°58′22″W
  - elevation: 800 ft (240 m)
- Mouth: Pacific Ocean
  - location: west of Salmon Creek, California
  - coordinates: 38°21′18″N 123°4′4″W
  - elevation: 0 ft (0 m)

Basin features
- Tributaries
  - right: Nolan Creek, Tannery Creek, Fay Creek, Coleman Valley Creek, Finley Creek

Salmon Creek is an 18.3-mile-long (29.5 km) stream in western Sonoma County, California that springs from coastal hills west of the town of Occidental and empties into the Pacific Ocean north of Bodega Head.

In 1843–44, most of the Salmon Creek watershed was included in the 35,000-acre (140 km^{2}) Rancho Bodega land grant awarded to Captain Stephen Smith.

== Ecology ==
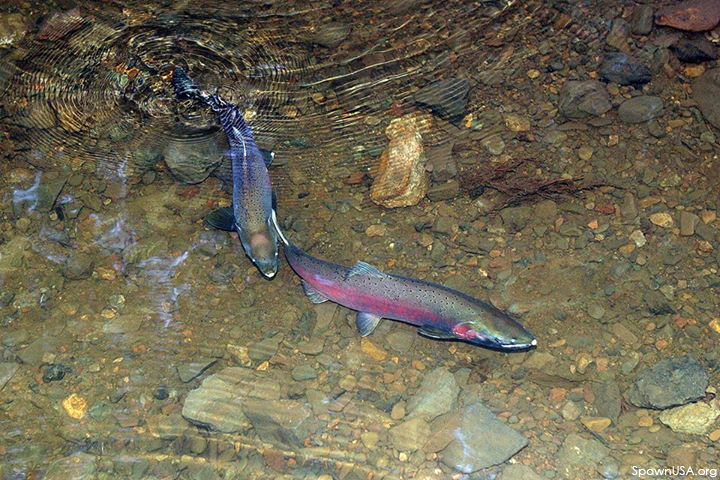
Coho salmon: Currently listed under the Federal Endangered Species Act and the California Endangered Species Act.

As of 2000, Salmon Creek and its five named tributaries all supported steelhead trout (Oncorhyncus mykiss). Salmon Creek also harbored California freshwater shrimp (Syncaris pacifica), and coho salmon (Oncorhyncus kisutch) were known to inhabit both Salmon Creek and Tannery Creek. By 2006, however, the salmon run had ceased. On July 2, 2010, the Salmon Creek Water Conservation Plan was released with important recommendations for restoring dry season instream flows, which have been exacerbated primarily by man-made water diversions. The Plan included such innovative solutions such as rooftop water harvesting and re-introduction of Golden Beaver. The historic presence of beaver was evident in the first Russian-American Company voyage by Ivan Kuskov who sailed into Bodega Bay in 1809 on the Kodiak and returned to Novo Arkhangelsk, Alaska (Sitka), with beaver skins and over 2,000 sea otter pelts. French naval captain Cyrille Laplace visited the Russian farms with the Aleksandr Rotchev, the last manager of Fort Ross, in 1839. After spending time at the Chernykh farm (near Graton probably on Purrington Creek) they rode to the Kirill Timofeevich Khlebnikov farm (near Bodega Corners) on Salmon Creek and wrote, "we had stopped a moment by a little river on the banks of which my traveling companion pointed out to me the former habitations of beaver, probably destroyed by the Indians in order to catch the rich prize that lay within." In 2009 and 2010 the California Department of Fish and Game have re-introduced coho salmon into Salmon Creek.

It is also the only extant location of the nearly extinct Baker's larkspur.

== Bridges ==
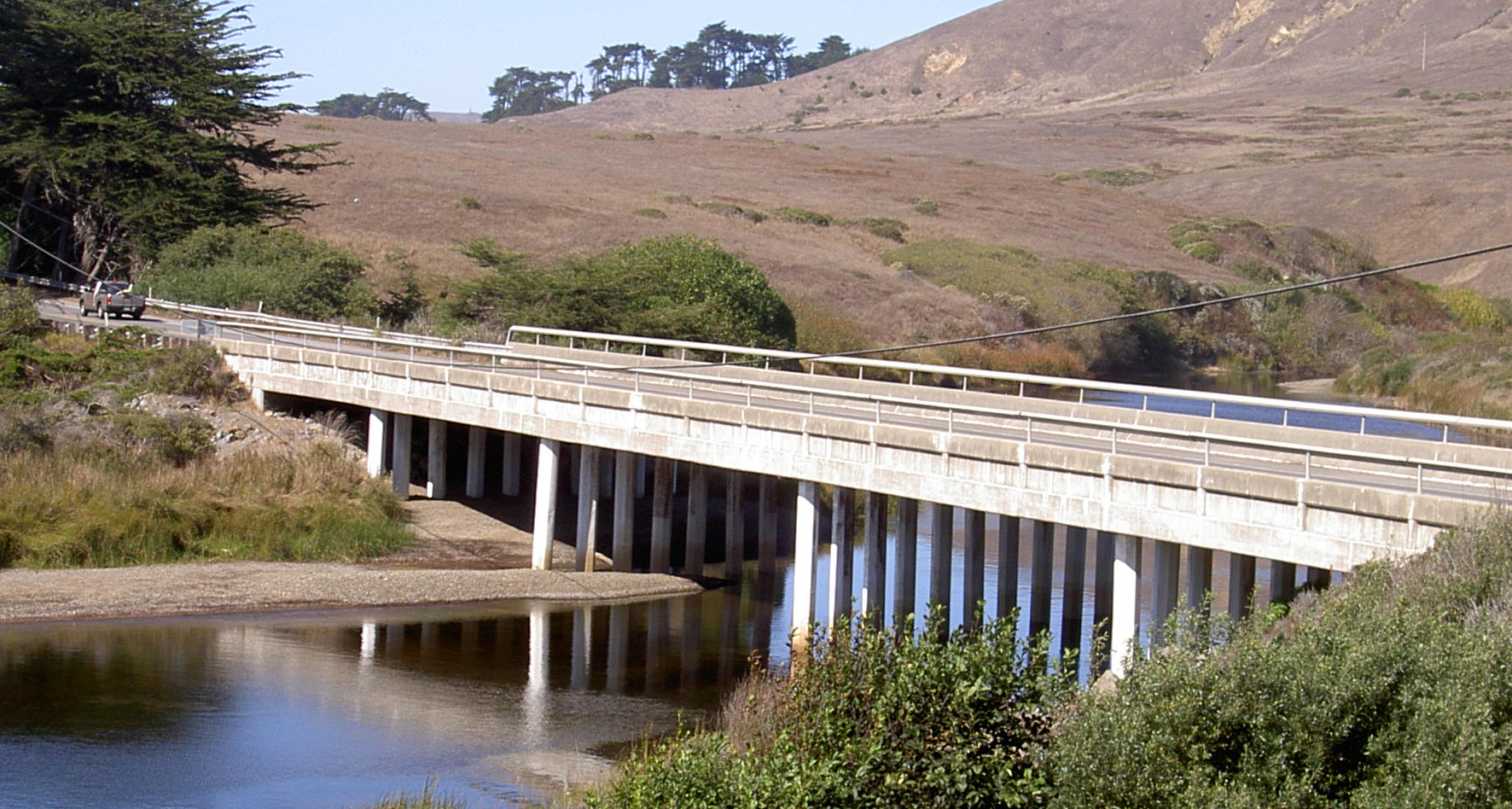
State Route 1 bridge at milepost 12.49

At least seven bridges span Salmon Creek. The newest and longest of these is the State Route 1 bridge, which is 200 feet (61 m) long and was built in 1983. Freestone Flat Road crosses on a steel truss 103 feet (31 m) long which was built in 1955, making it the oldest of the seven. Bodega Highway crosses in two places: 0.9 miles (1.4 km) from State Route 1 on a bridge 92 feet (28 m) long built in 1962 and at Valley Ford-Freestone Road on a 76 ft (23 m) bridge built in 1968. Salmon Creek Road spans the creek on a 78 ft (24 m) bridge dating from 1958, Bohemian Highway crosses on a 70 ft (21 m) bridge from 1971, and Scouts Camp Road crosses on a 57 ft (17 m) structure from 1960.

== See also ==
- List of watercourses in the San Francisco Bay Area
- Salmon Creek Middle School
