= Rancho Cañada de Jonive =

Mexican land grant in California

Coordinates: 38.39°N 122.88°W

Rancho Cañada de Jonive was a 10,787-acre (43.65 km^{2}) Mexican land grant in present day Sonoma County, California given in 1845 by Governor Pío Pico to James Black. The grant encompassed the town of Freestone.

== History ==
At the direction of Governor José Figueroa in 1835, Mariano Guadalupe Vallejo began construction of the Presidio of Sonoma to counter the Russian presence at Fort Ross. To extend the settlements in the direction of Fort Ross, Vallejo sent three men, Edward McIntosh, James Black (1810–1870), and James Dawson (–1843), in that direction. These three men came to California as sailors with Captain John B.R. Cooper, brother-in-law of General Vallejo. The Russian-American Company left Fort Ross and sold it to John Sutter in 1841. Black settled upon what would become Rancho Cañada de Jonive, while Dawson and McIntosh settled upon Rancho Estero Americano. They formed a partnership to build a saw-mill on Salmon Creek, near the town of Freestone. The mill on Rancho Cañada de Jonive operated until 1849, when they sold all the lumber they had and left for the gold mines.

James Black (1810–1870) was born in Inverness, Scotland. He went sea at an early age, and came to Monterey in 1832. In 1842, when the Russians pulled out of California, Black had already left this frontier outpost to cut timber for John Cooper on his Rancho Punta de Quentin. In 1844, Black married Maria Agustina Sais (1828–1864), sister of Domingo Sais (1806–1853), grantee of Rancho Cañada de Herrera. Black moved back to Rancho Cañada de Jonive, where he received the two square league grant in 1845. Black traded holdings with Jasper O’Farrell in 1848; Black ending up with O’Farrell’s Rancho Nicasio holding and O’Farrell with Rancho Cañada de Jonive.

With the cession of California to the United States following the Mexican-American War, the 1848 Treaty of Guadalupe Hidalgo provided that the land grants would be honored. As required by the Land Act of 1851, a claim for Rancho Cañada de Jonive was filed with the Public Land Commission in 1852, and the grant was patented to Jasper O'Farrell in 1858.

O'Farrell married Mary McChristian in 1849 and they moved to Rancho Cañada de Jonive, and resided there until his death in 1875.

== See also ==
- Ranchos of Sonoma County, California
- Ranchos of California
