= Fallon, California =

Unincorporated community in California, United States

Fallon
- Unincorporated community
- Location in California Fallon (the United States)
- Coordinates: 38°16′29″N 122°54′21″W
- Country: United States
- State: California
- County: Marin
- Elevation: 75 ft (23 m)
- Area code: 707

Fallon is an unincorporated community in Marin County, California, United States. Fallon is located at 38°16′29″N 122°54′21″W, 2 miles (3.2 km) north of Tomales, at an elevation of 75 feet (23 m). It lies just west of State Route 1 along the abandoned North Pacific Coast Railroad.

== History ==
The name Fallon honors Luke and James Fallon, early local settlers. Starting in the 1870s, Fallon was a stop on the North Pacific Coast Railroad connecting Cazadero to the Sausalito ferry to San Francisco. The Fallon family operated a dairy and creamery in the area, and shipped dairy products to San Francisco and beyond by rail. Following soon after, in 1898, the first post office in Fallon opened. The town survived the 1906 San Francisco Earthquake with little damage, but in 1912, the creamery, train station, and other businesses burned to the ground, and Fallon began to decline as the creamery relocated to the Tomales area.

Rail service to Fallon ended in 1930.

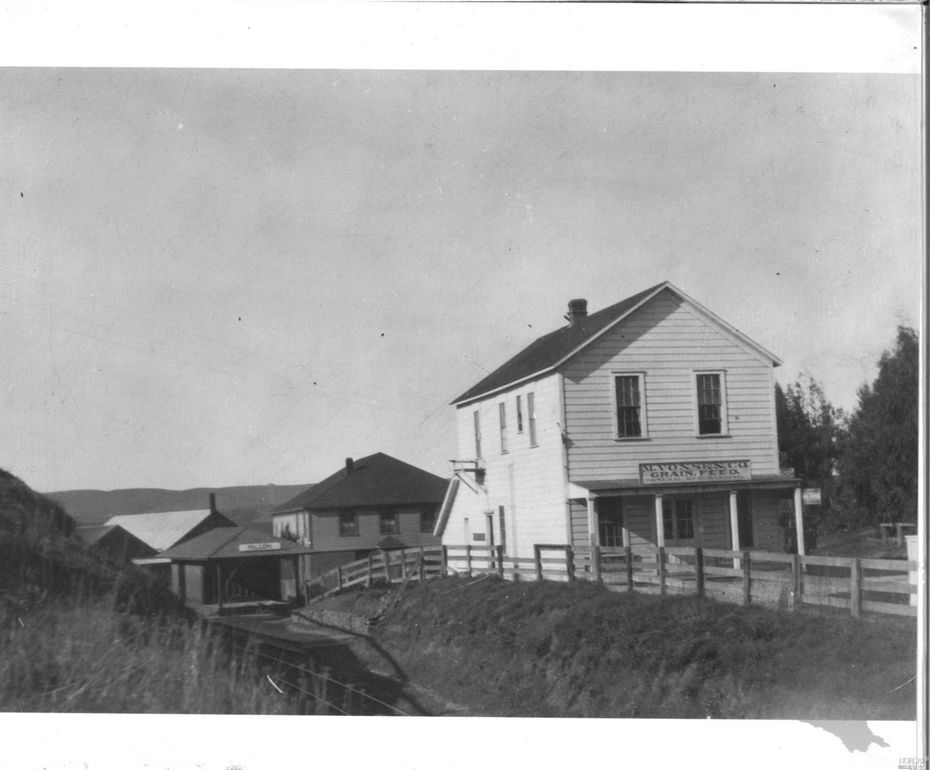
Fallon Station And Nearby Grain & Feed Store 1898-1907
