= Sonoma County Historic Landmarks and Districts =

This is a list of Sonoma County Landmarks as designated by the Sonoma County's Landmark Commission.

It is intended to include all Sonoma County government-designated landmarks in unincorporated areas of Sonoma County, but to exclude landmarks in separately incorporated cities and towns. In general, the county will not designate landmarks within the borders of the county's cities and towns. However, within the current area of Windsor, California, which was not incorporated until 19xx, the county had already designated several landmarks. Windsor has assumed responsibility for these historic sites and has collected the documentation of those sites' histories. These Windsor sites are listed now within Windsor historical landmarks article and are not repeated here.

Some degree of preservation of historic nature of the Sonoma County Landmarks is performed by the County of Sonoma's Permit and Resource Management Department. (Which does not itself designate landmarks, but follows requirements for it to protect duly designated sites.)

Click the "Map of all coordinates" link to the right to view a Google map of all properties and districts with latitude and longitude coordinates in the table below.

== Sonoma County listings ==
Image		Landmark name	Location	City or town	Summary
Upload Photo	1	Freestone Historic District	38°22′21″N 122°54′56″W	Freestone	District designated in 1974 comprising 30 properties.
Freestone House	2	Freestone House	306 Bohemian Highway; 38°22′20″N 122°54′59″W	Freestone	Designated in 1974. Also known as the Hinds Hotel, Park House and the Wayside Inn.
Upload Photo	3	Morgan Williams Residence	301 Bohemian Highway; 38°22′21″N 122°54′58″W	Freestone	Designated in 1974. Demolished.
Freestone Schoolhouse	4	Freestone Schoolhouse	201 Bohemian Highway; 38°22′23″N 122°54′49″W	Freestone	Designated in 1974.
Freestone Country Store	5	Freestone Country Store	500 Bohemian Highway; 38°22′24″N 122°55′06″W	Freestone	Designated in 1974.
Sweetwater Springs Historic District	8	Sweetwater Springs Historic District	38°32′10″N 122°52′04″W	Healdsburg	Designated in 1976. Comprises four buildings and two properties including the former Hop Kiln Winery (pictured).
Church of Occidental	12	Church of Occidental	3637 Church Street; 38°24′24″N 122°56′48″W	Occidental	Designated in 1980.
Upload Photo	13	Union Hotel	3639 Church Street; 38°24′29″N 122°56′51″W	Occidental	Designated in 1980. Also known as the Union Saloon and Hotel.
Upload Photo	14	Taylor Building	3611 Main Street; 38°24′24″N 122°56′50″W	Occidental	Designated in 1980.
C.F. Leiding House	15	C.F. Leiding House	19772 8th Street East; 38°17′04″N 122°25′58″W	Sonoma	Designated in 1975.
Upload Photo	16	Cutter House	1275 MacArthur Street; 38°16′56″N 122°26′02″W	Sonoma	Designated in 1975.
Upload Photo	17	Magnolia Farm	19745 8th Street East; 38°17′07″N 122°26′15″W	Sonoma	Designated in 1975. Also known as McCracken Home.
Buena Vista Winery	18	Buena Vista Winery	18000 Old Winery Road; 38°17′58″N 122°25′19″W	Sonoma	Designated in 1975. Also listed a California Historic Landmark and is listed on the U.S. National Register of Historic Places.
Upload Photo	19	Count Haraszthy Villa	1990 Castle Road; 38°18′01″N 122°25′35″W	Sonoma	Designated in 1975. Also a California Historic Landmark.
Upload Photo	20	Fetter’s Hot Springs Depot	215 Depot Road; 38°19′11″N 122°29′13″W	Sonoma, California	Designated in 1975.
Upload Photo	21	Agua Caliente Springs Hotel	17250 Vailetti Drive; 38°19′18″N 122°29′32″W	Sonoma, California	Designated in 1975 and 1980. Also known as Agua Caliente Villa.
Upload Photo	22	Our Lady of Mount Carmel Church	26270 Asti Road; 38°45′47″N 122°58′41″W	Cloverdale, California	Designated in 1976. Also known as Asti Chapel, La Madonna del Carmine, El Carmelo, and Italian Swiss Colony Church.
Watson School & Wayside Park	23	Watson School & Wayside Park	15000 Bodega Highway; 38°21′21″N 122°56′18″W	Valley Ford, California	Designated in 1976.
Running Fence	24	Running Fence	14459 Valley Ford Road; 38°19′04″N 122°55′28″W	Valley Ford, California	Designated in 1976. Temporary art installation.
Cyrus Alexander Adobe and Cemetery	25	Cyrus Alexander Adobe and Cemetery	8640 Highway 128; 38°39′29″N 122°47′18″W	Healdsburg, California	Designated in 1977. Located at Alexander Valley Vineyards.
Upload Photo	27	Fort Ross School	Stillwater Cove Regional Park, 22455 Highway 1	Stewarts Point, California	Designated in 1978.
Upload Photo	28	Clemente Inn	17341 Highway 12; 38°19′14″N 122°29′10″W	Sonoma, California	Designated in 1989. Demolished.
Upload Photo	29	Haystack Ranch	3355 Petaluma Boulevard South; 38°13′15″N 122°36′20″W	Petaluma, California	Designated in 1976. Also called Haystack Landing. Demolished.
Potter School	30	Potter School	17110 Bodega Lane; 38°20′45″N 122°58′19″W	Bodega, California	Designated in 1978.
Upload Photo	31	St. Philip's Church	3730 Bohemian Highway; 38°24′30″N 122°56′56″W	Occidental, California	Designated in 1978.
Geyserville School	32	Geyserville School	21225 Geyserville Avenue; 38°42′28″N 122°54′24″W	Geyserville, California	Designated in 1978. Demolished.
Madrona Knolls Rancho	33	Madrona Knolls Rancho	1001 Westside Road; 38°36′17″N 122°53′07″W	Healdsburg, California	Designated in 1978. Also on listed on the U.S. National Register of Historic Places.
Upload Photo	34	Wegenerville Resort	1883 London Ranch Road; 38°21′38″N 122°32′31″W	Glen Ellen, California	Designated in 1979. Located at Benziger Family Winery.
Upload Photo	35	Massey House	4845 Grange Road; 38°22′35″N 122°38′21″W	Santa Rosa, California	Designated in 1979. Also known as Tara.
Upload Photo	36	Bennett Valley Grange Hall	4145 Grange Road; 38°23′32″N 122°38′23″W	Santa Rosa, California	Designated in 1979. Also called Bennett Valley Guild.
Upload Photo	37	Benjamin Ranch	4232 Grange Road	Santa Rosa, California	Designated in 1979.
Upload Photo	38	Thompson Ranch and Cemetery	7301 Enterprise Road	Glen Ellen, California	Designated in 1979.
Upload Photo	39	Bennett Valley Cemetery	4760 Bennett Valley Road; 38°24′58″N 122°39′41″W	Santa Rosa, California	Designated in 1979.
Upload Photo	40	Eucalyptus School	4674 Hessel Road	Sebastopol, California	Designated in 1979.
Washoe House	41	Washoe House	2840 Roblar Road; 38°18′51″N 122°44′09″W	Petaluma, California	Designated in 1979.
Upload Photo	42	Llano Road House	4353 Gravenstein Highway South; 38°21′27″N 122°46′08″W	Sebastopol, California	Designated in 1979.
Upload Photo	43	Witham House	14201 Bodega Highway; 38°21′21″N 122°55′23″W	Bodega, California	Designated in 1979.
Upload Photo	44	Dry Creek Store	3485 Dry Creek Road; 38°39′17″N 122°55′18″W	Healdsburg, California	Designated in 1979. Now known as Dry Creek General Store.
Upload Photo	45	Hicks House	3160 Hicks Road; 38°26′16″N 122°51′56″W	Graton, California	Designated in 1979. Also known as the Moses C. Hicks House.
Kenwood Depot	46	Kenwood Depot	314 Warm Springs Road; 38°24′38″N 122°33′01″W	Kenwood, California	Designated in 1980. Also known as the Kenwood Railroad Depot and South Los Guillicos Station.
Upload Photo	47	Nicholas Carriger Grand View	2151 Grove Street; 38°17′36″N 122°31′03″W	Sonoma, California	Designated in 1979. Also known as the Nicholas Carriger Ranch or House.
Nicholas Carriger Estate	48	Nicholas Carriger Estate	18880 Carriger Road; 38°17′48″N 122°30′43″W	Sonoma, California	Designated in 1979. Also listed on the National Register of Historic Places.
Upload Photo	49	Cooper House	600 Harris Road; 38°16′37″N 122°28′24″W	Sonoma, California	Designated in 1980.
Temelec Hall, Guest Cottages and Carriage House	50	Temelec Hall, Guest Cottages and Carriage House	220 and 221 Temelec Circle; 38°15′57″N 122°29′59″W	Sonoma, California	Designated in 1981 and 1998.
Upload Photo	51	Kiser House	755 Watmaugh Road; 38°15′47″N 122°28′30″W	Sonoma, California	Designated in 1980. Also called Agnew Ranch.
Upload Photo	52	Rosser Ranch	405 Watmaugh Road; 38°15′53″N 122°28′11″W	Sonoma, California	Designated in 1980.
Upload Photo	53	Circle Bar Ranch Barn	25730 Arnold Drive; 38°12′05″N 122°26′52″W	Sonoma, California	Designated in 1980.
Upload Photo	54	Salt Ranch & Residence	24737 Arnold Drive; 38°12′53″N 122°27′31″W	Sonoma, California	Designated in 1980. Located at Cline Cellars.
Upload Photo	55	Laidlaw House	22101 Arnold Drive; 38°14′40″N 122°28′08″W	Sonoma, California	Designated in 1980.
Upload Photo	56	Kiser Residence	23450 Highway 121; 38°13′46″N 122°27′29″W	Sonoma, California	Designated in 1980.
Upload Photo	57	Haraszthy Ranch	27000 Ramal Road; 38°13′34″N 122°22′42″W	Sonoma, California	Designated in 1980. Located at Carneros Hills Winery.
Upload Photo	58	Schellville Baptist Church	23109 Central Road	Sonoma, California	Designated in 1980. Also called New Life Assembly of God Church and Chula Vista School.
Upload Photo	59	Sonoma Mission Inn	18140 Highway 12; 38°18′46″N 122°28′59″W	Sonoma, California	Designated in 1986.
Upload Photo	60	James Kruse House	4918 Old Redwood Highway; 38°30′12″N 122°45′24″W	Santa Rosa, California	Designated in 1980. Also called the Jim Voss Ranch.
Upload Photo	61	Jim Voss Commemorative Cottonwood Grove	4600 Lavell Road; 38°30′14″N 122°45′31″W	Santa Rosa, California	Designated in 1980. Grove of cottonwood trees at Mark West School.
Upload Photo	62	Maddux Home	5063 Old Redwood Highway North; 38°30′21″N 122°45′34″W	Santa Rosa, California	Designated in 1980.
Upload Photo	63	John Rosseter Stables	4900 Carriage Lane; 38°30′18″N 122°44′39″W	Santa Rosa, California	Designated in 1980. Also called Wikiup Stables.
Upload Photo	64	Finley Hop Ranch	208 Ursuline Road; 38°17′26″N 122°28′09″W	Santa Rosa, California	Designated in 1980.
Upload Photo	65	Joshua Chauvet House	13760 Arnold Drive; 38°21′43″N 122°31′35″W	Glen Ellen, California	Designated in 1980.
Upload Photo	66	Wohler Ranch	10630 Wohler Road; 38°29′51″N 122°52′39″W	Healdsburg, California	Designated in 1980.
Upload Photo	67	Gaige House	13540 Arnold Drive; 38°22′01″N 122°31′29″W	Glen Ellen, California	Designated in 1980.
Upload Photo	69	Calvin H. Holmes House	13540 Arnold Drive; 38°38′31″N 122°42′12″W	Calistoga, California	Designated in 1980.
Upload Photo	70	Jackson Place	12001 Franz Valley Road; 38°37′55″N 122°40′46″W	Calistoga, California	Designated in 1980. Also called the Bavarian Lion Company Property.
Upload Photo	71	Franz Valley District School	9295 Franz Valley School Road; 38°34′53″N 122°38′59″W	Calistoga, California	Designated in 1980.
Upload Photo	72	Laufenburg Barn & Residence	17104 Spencer Lane; 38°37′01″N 122°40′06″W	Calistoga, California	Designated in 1980.
Old Horicon School	74	Old Horicon School	33300 Annapolis Road; 38°43′08″N 123°21′35″W	Annapolis, California	Designated in 1981. Also called Horicon Schoolhouse.
Upload Photo	75	Mervyn Hotel Site	13751 Arnold Drive; 38°21′44″N 122°31′32″W	Glen Ellen, California	Designated in 1990. Demolished in the 1930s, it was a social center in Glen Ellen built in 1885.
Chateau Saint Jean	76	Chateau Saint Jean	843 Saint Jean Court; 38°21′44″N 122°31′32″W	Kenwood, California	Designated in 1981. Also called the Goff Residence.
Upload Photo	77	Partis Residence	98 Shaw Avenue; 38°25′02″N 122°33′04″W	Kenwood, California	Designated in 1981.
Kenwood Winery	78	Kenwood Winery	9592 Highway 12; 38°24′51″N 122°32′45″W	Kenwood, California	Designated in 1981.
Upload Photo	80	Wildwood Vineyards	11011 Highway 12; 38°23′59″N 122°32′14″W	Kenwood, California	Designated in 1981. Also called James Shaw Ranch.
Kenwood Community Church	82	Kenwood Community Church	9655 Channing Row; 38°24′45″N 122°32′49″W	Kenwood, California	Designated in 1981. Also called First Congregational Church of Los Guilicos.
Upload Photo	83	Superintendent's House, Sonoma State Hospital	15000 Arnold Drive; 38°20′55″N 122°31′03″W	Eldridge, California	Designated in 1981. Also called the Mansion and the California Home for the Care and Training of Feeble-Minded Children.
Upload Photo	84	Shone’s Country Market	13750 Arnold Drive; 38°21′45″N 122°31′34″W	Glen Ellen, California	Designated in 1981. Also called C.J. Poppe’s Store.
Upload Photo	85	Chauvet Building	13740 Arnold Drive; 38°21′46″N 122°31′32″W	Glen Ellen, California	Designated in 1981.
Upload Photo	86	Hotel Chauvet	13756 Arnold Drive; 38°21′44″N 122°31′34″W	Glen Ellen, California	Designated in 1981. Also called the Glen Ellen Hotel and Four Nations Restaurant.
Upload Photo	87	Jack London Village: Stone Winery Building	14301 Arnold Drive; 38°21′16″N 122°31′27″W	Glen Ellen, California	Designated in 1981. Now the site of Aventine.
Upload Photo	88	Calabezas Creek Bridge	O'Donnell Lane	Glen Ellen, California	Designated in 1981. Also called O’Donnell Lane Bridge.
Upload Photo	89	Zane House	3443 Warm Springs Road; 38°22′26″N 122°32′50″W	Glen Ellen, California	Demolished
Upload Photo	90	Wake Robin Lodge	4100 Wake Robin Drive; 38°22′07″N 122°32′20″W	Glen Ellen, California	Designated in 1981.
Upload Photo	91	Glen Oaks	13255 Highway 12; 38°22′18″N 122°30′48″W	Glen Ellen, California	Designated in 1981. Also called Glen Oaks Vineyards.
Upload Photo	92	Ten Oaks Ranch	12783 Dunbar Road; 38°22′29″N 122°31′05″W	Glen Ellen, California	Designated in 1981. Also called Kate Warfield Ranch, Decker House, and Cook Ranch.
Upload Photo	93	Cavedale Road Marker	255 Cavedale Road; 38°20′25″N 122°29′22″W	Sonoma, California	Designated in 1981.
Upload Photo	94	General Joseph Hooker’s Ranch	16601 Meadow Oaks Drive; 38°19′46″N 122°29′24″W	Sonoma, California	Designated in 1981.
Upload Photo	96-99	Sobre Vista Farm	1225 Sobre Vista Drive; 38°19′51″N 122°30′50″W	Sonoma, California	Designated in 1981.
Bosworth Residence	100	Bosworth Residence	21238 Geyserville Avenue; 38°42′31″N 122°54′25″W	Geyserville, California	Designated in 1981. Also called Bosworth House and The Palms.
Old Geyserville Hotel	101	Old Geyserville Hotel	Geyserville Avenue; 38°42′29″N 122°54′30″W	Geyserville, California	Designated in 1981.
Upload Photo	102	Watson Ranch	498 Pepper Road; 38°17′05″N 122°42′01″W	Petaluma, California	Also called Garden Valley Ranch and Pepper Farm.
Upload Photo	103	Watmaugh Road Bridge	300 Watmaugh Road; 38°16′06″N 122°28′14″W	Sonoma, California	Designated in 1981.
Heart's Desire Nursery & Trentadue Winery	104	Heart's Desire Nursery & Trentadue Winery	19165 Redwood Highway; 38°40′51″N 122°52′47″W	Geyserville, California	Designated in 1981. Also called Trentadue Vineyards.
Upload Photo	105	Kenny Residence	19280 Riverside Drive; 38°17′50″N 122°28′56″W	Sonoma, California	Designated in 1981.
Alexander Valley Community Church	106	Alexander Valley Community Church	6650 Alexander Valley Road; 38°39′58″N 122°49′13″W	Geyserville, California	Designated in 1981. Also called the People’s Protestant Church.
Upload Photo	107	The Sea Ranch Stable & Barn	37600 Highway 1; 38°42′56″N 123°27′20″W	Sea Ranch, California	Designated in 1981. Also called the People’s Protestant Church.
Upload Photo	108	The Sea Ranch Condominium #1	110-128 Sea Walk Dr. 38°40′45″N 123°25′43″W	Sea Ranch, California	Designated in 1981.
Upload Photo	109	Stewarts Point Hotel, School & Store	31000 Highway 1; 38°38′42″N 123°23′52″W	Stewarts Point, California	Designated in 1982.
Upload Photo	112	Saw Mill Teepee	31090 Seaview Road; 38°33′37″N 123°16′16″W	Cazadero, California	Designated in 1982.
Upload Photo	113	Bufano Statue	21780 CA-1; 38°32′00″N 123°16′38″W	Jenner, California	Designated in 1982.
Fort Ross State Historic Park	114	Fort Ross State Historic Park	19005 Highway 1; 38°31′06″N 123°14′18″W	Jenner, California	Designated in 1981.
Upload Photo	116	Duncans Mills Depot	23600 Moscow Road; 38°27′12″N 123°03′13″W	Duncans Mills, California	Designated in 1982.
Upload Photo	117	Duncans Mills School	25250 Main Street	Duncans Mills, California	Designated in 1982.
Upload Photo	118	Superintendent's House	24951 Highway 116; 38°27′23″N 123°03′13″W	Duncans Mills, California	Designated in 1982.
Upload Photo	119	Gleason Ranch	6000 Highway 1; 38°23′14″N 123°04′43″W	Carmet, California	Designated in 1982. Also called Mann Ranch.
Upload Photo	120	Carrington Ranch	4300 Highway 1; 38°21′56″N 123°04′00″W	Salmon Creek, California	Designated in 1982. Also called Genazzi Dairy Ranch.
Upload Photo	121	Stage Stop	255 McChristian Avenue; 38°20′59″N 123°03′46″W	Bodega Bay, California	Designated in 1982.
Upload Photo	122	Greek Revival Cottage	14210 Highway 1; 38°19′08″N 122°55′12″W	Valley Ford, California	Designated in 1982.
Upload Photo	123	James Fowler House	14270 Valley Ford Road; 38°19′06″N 122°55′13″W	Valley Ford, California	Designated in 1982.
Upload Photo	124	Italianate Cottage	14395 Mill Street; 38°18′56″N 122°51′26″W	Valley Ford, California	Designated in 1982.
Upload Photo	125	Kirkland House	14380 Valley Ford Road; 38°19′04″N 122°55′25″W	Valley Ford, California	Designated in 1982.
Upload Photo	126	Valley Ford Hotel	14415 Valley Ford Road; 38°19′03″N 122°55′29″W	Valley Ford, California	Designated in 1982. Also called Sandy's and Rocker Oysterfellers.
Upload Photo	128	Meeker Residence	5555 Sylvania Heights Road; 38°25′36″N 122°57′29″W	Camp Meeker, California	Designated in 1983.
Upload Photo	129	Belden House	13555 Highway 116; 38°29′59″N 122°59′21″W	Guerneville, California	Designated in 1982.
Upload Photo	130	Travis House & Orchard	5925 Van Keppel Road; 38°28′31″N 122°52′50″W	Forestville, California	Designated in 1982. House demolished. Orchard remains.
Upload Photo	131	The Gables	4257 Petaluma Hill Road; 38°23′37″N 122°41′35″W	Santa Rosa, California	Designated in 1983.
Upload Photo	133	Denman Creamery	5433 Old Redwood Highway North; 38°16′55″N 122°40′05″W	Penngrove, California	Designated in 1984.
Upload Photo	134	Coleman Valley Ranch	17220 Coleman Valley Road; 38°16′55″N 122°40′05″W	Occidental, California	Designated in 1984.
Upload Photo	135	Rose Villa	644 Grant Street; 38°36′56″N 122°51′48″W	Healdsburg, California	Also called Powell’s Place.
Bodega Historic District	136	Bodega Historic District	38°20′43″N 122°58′26″W	Bodega, California	Historic district comprising 34 properties.
Occidental Historic District	137	Occidental Historic District	38°24′27″N 122°56′54″W	Occidental, California	Historic district comprising 27 properties.
Penngrove Historic District	138	Penngrove Historic District	38°17′59″N 122°40′00″W	Penngrove, California	Historic district comprising 27 properties.
Duncans Mills Historic District	139	Duncans Mills Historic District	38°27′14″N 123°03′18″W	Duncans Mills, California	Historic district comprising 27 properties.
Upload Photo	140	Sobre Vista Overview Farm	15650 Arnold Drive; 38°20′04″N 122°30′54″W	Sonoma, California	Designated in 1984.
Upload Photo	141	Preston Ranch	33000 Geysers Road; 33000-32300 Highway 101; 38°50′33″N 123°00′40″W	Geyserville, California	Designated in 1990. The ranch comprises a cemetery, home, and church.
Upload Photo	142	Laughlin House	414 Aviation Boulevard; 38°30′45″N 122°47′09″W	Santa Rosa, California	Designated in 1984. Also called Kenny Residence.
Green Valley School	143	Green Valley School	4060 Green Valley School Road; 38°26′27″N 122°53′50″W	Sebastopol, California	Designated in 1992.
Upload Photo	144	Alexander Valley Community Hall	5512 Highway 128; 38°40′55″N 122°50′23″W	Geyserville, California	Designated in 1992.
Upload Photo	145	Leveroni Ranch	601 Leveroni Road; 38°16′39″N 122°28′20″W	Sonoma, California	Designated in 1980.
Upload Photo	146	James Watson / Hollis Hitchcock Ranch	14100 Bodega Highway; 38°21′09″N 122°55′54″W	Bodega, California	Also called Mache Dairy Ranch.
Upload Photo	147	Sweeney Ranch	156-155 San Antonio Rd. 38°11′08″N 122°36′22″W	Petaluma, California	
Upload Photo	149	Dunham School	4001 Roblar Road; 38°19′16″N 122°45′24″W	Petaluma, California	
Upload Photo	150	Bloomfield Masonic Lodge Hall	6640 Bloomfield Rd. 38°18′47″N 122°51′06″W	Petaluma, California	
Upload Photo	151	Bloomfield Cemetery	13051 Sutton Street; 38°18′49″N 122°51′30″W	Petaluma	
Upload Photo	152	Two Rock Grange Hall	7065 Bodega Avenue; 38°15′29″N 122°46′48″W	Petaluma, California	
Upload Photo	153	Kastania Ranch	4412 Kastania Road; 38°12′45″N 122°36′13″W	Petaluma, California	Designated in 1985.
Upload Photo	154	Mills-Stump Ranch	12528 Valley Ford Road; 38°18′47″N 122°51′56″W	Valley Ford, California	
Upload Photo	155	Octagon House	3925 Spring Hill Road; 38°14′13″N 122°45′14″W	Petaluma, California	
Upload Photo	156	Bloomfield IOOF Hall	6600 Bloomfield Road; 38°18′49″N 122°51′06″W	Petaluma, California	Also called the Bloomfield Town Hall.
Upload Photo	157	Bloomfield School	6691 Moro Street; 38°18′41″N 122°50′59″W	Petaluma, California	
Upload Photo	158	Presbyterian Church Cemetery	7063 Bodega Avenue; 38°15′25″N 122°46′48″W	Petaluma, California	Also called Two Rock Cemetery.
Upload Photo	159	Triniti School	11790 Dunbar Road; 38°23′11″N 122°31′29″W	Glen Ellen, California	
Upload Photo	160	Liberty Cemetery	Liberty Road	Petaluma, California	
Upload Photo	163	Holy Ghost Hall	4649 Bodega Avenue; 38°15′13″N 122°42′10″W	Petaluma, California	Designated in 1996.
Upload Photo	164	Del Mar Ranch	40500-40600 Leeward Road; 38°44′33″N 123°29′55″W	Sea Ranch, California	Designated in 1996. Comprises two buildings.
Upload Photo	165	Walker-Case House	7446 Poplar Drive; 38°28′56″N 122°54′01″W	Forestville, California	Designated in 1995.
Upload Photo	166	Kee Ranch House	1895 Bay Flat Road; 38°19′45″N 123°03′35″W	Bodega Bay, California	Designated in 1996.
Upload Photo	167	Highland Dell Resort	21058-21050 River Blvd. 38°27′58″N 123°00′30″W	Monte Rio, California	Designated in 1997.
Upload Photo	168	Sanders House	2020 Sanders Rd. 38°22′29″N 122°50′37″W	Sebastopol, California	Designated in 2000.
Upload Photo	169	Arnold Drive Bridge	Arnold Drive	Sonoma, California	Designated in 1998.
Upload Photo	170	Geysers Road Over Big Sulphur Creek Bridge	Geysers Road	Cloverdale, California	Designated in 1998.
Upload Photo	171	Chalk Hill Road Over Maacama Creek Bridge	Chalk Hill Road	Healdsburg, California	Designated in 1998.
Upload Photo	172	Clarks Crossing Bridge	Annapolis Road	Annapolis, California	Designated in 1998.
Upload Photo	173	Guerneville Bridge	Highway 116 / River Road	Guerneville, California	Designated in 1998.
Upload Photo	174	Hacienda Bridge	River Road	Guerneville, California	Designated in 1998.
Upload Photo	175	Haupt Creek Bridge	Skaggs Springs Road	Annapolis, California	Designated in 1998.
Upload Photo	176	Lambert Bridge	Lambert Bridge Road	Healdsburg, California	Designated in 1998.
Upload Photo	177	North Fork Bridge	Old Highway 1	Gualala, California	Designated in 1998.
Upload Photo	190	Wharff-Aggesen House	38°17′24″N 122°40′46″W	Penngrove	Designated in 2002.
Upload Photo	191	Asti Villa Pompei	38°45′52″N 122°55′47″W	Cloverdale	Designated in 2004.
Soda Rock Winery	192	Soda Rock Winery	8025 Highway 128; 38°39′39″N 122°47′58″W	Healdsburg	Designated in 2007. Burned in 2020.
