= Matapan =

Matapan may refer to:

- Cape Matapan, southernmost point of mainland Greece
- Battle of Cape Matapan, naval battle of 1941
- Battle of Matapan, naval battle of 1717
- HMS Matapan (D43), battle-class fleet destroyer of the Royal Navy

== See also ==
- Matapang
- Mattapan, Massachusetts
- Hembree House, Windsor, California, also known as Mattapan
