= Cunningham House =

Cunningham House may refer to:

- Cunningham House (Windsor, California), a Windsor historical landmark
- Cunningham House (Salvisa, Kentucky), listed on the National Register of Historic Places (NRHP) in Mercer County
- Cunningham House (Glens Falls, New York), listed on the NRHP in Warren County
- Captain James & Susannah Cunningham Homestead, near Comanche, Texas, listed on the NRHP in Comanche County
