= Hinds Hotel =

- U.S. National Register of Historic Places
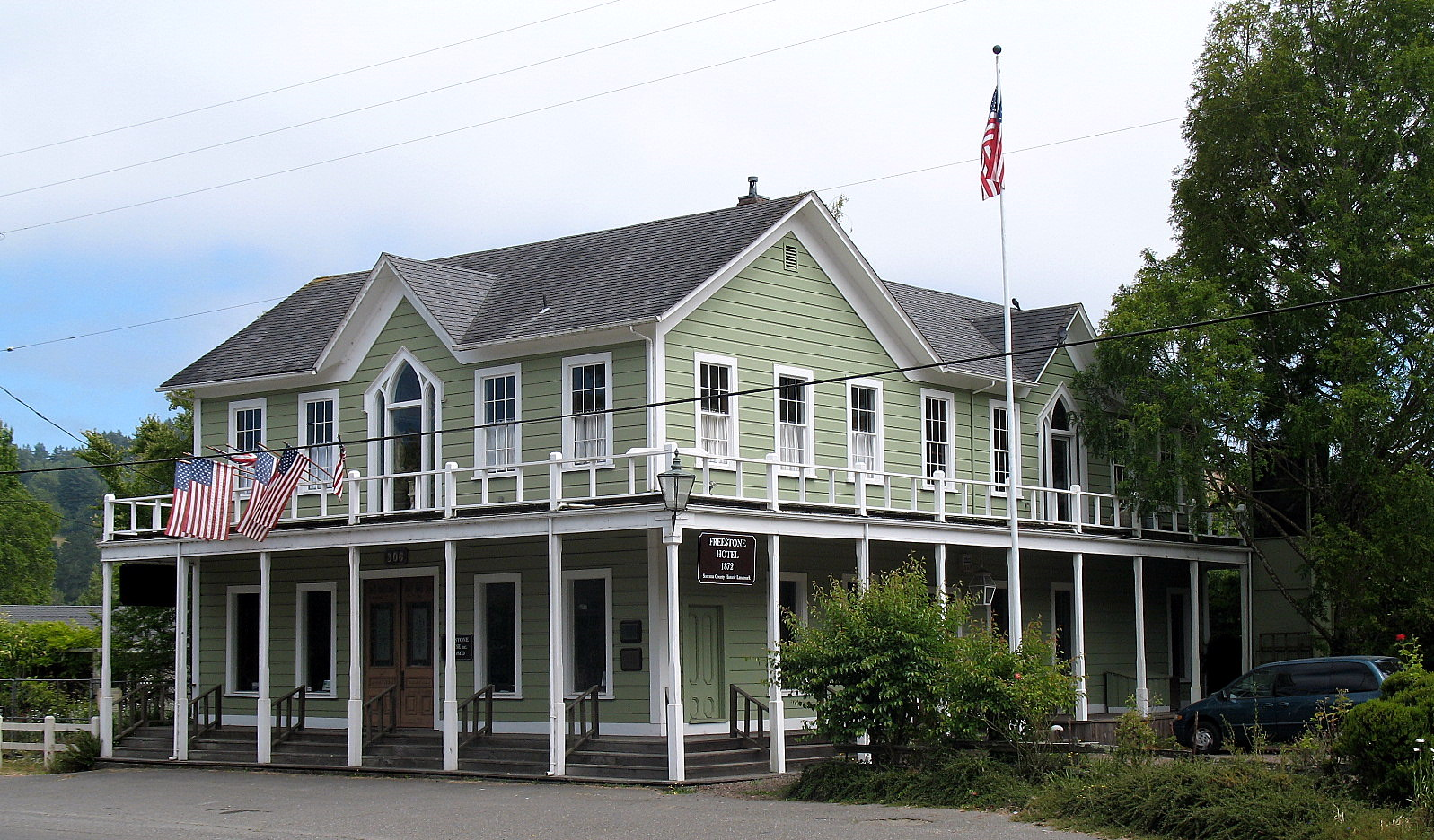
- Hinds Hotel in 2010

- Location within California Location within the United States
- Location: 306 Bohemian Highway, Freestone, California, United States
- Coordinates: 38°26′14″N 122°51′54″W
- Built: 1876
- Architectural style: Gothic Revival
- NRHP reference No.: 79000557
- Added to NRHP: January 31, 1979

The Hinds Hotel (also known as the Freestone House, Freestone Hotel, Park House, and Wayside Inn) is a historic building located in Freestone, California in the United States. Built in 1876, the Hinds Hotel is a former hotel, antique store and plant nursery. Today, it serves as a private commercial business and home. It is listed on the National Register of Historic Places and has been named a California Historic Landmark and a Sonoma County Historic Landmark.

== History ==
The 32-room Hinds Hotel was built in August 1876 by Hollis B. Hinds. A farmer, Hinds moved to Sonoma County in 1863 from Tennessee. He built the hotel upon the announcement that the North Pacific Coast Railroad would start serving Freestone, which would serve as the terminus. The hotel was frequently used by carpenters working on the railroad line. According to first hand reports, the innkeeper at the Hinds Hotel intentionally had parts of a nearby bridge, that the carpenters were building, burned at night, delaying the completion of work in order to retain his client base longer. The innkeeper would serve time in jail for his efforts.

As of 1910, the building was called Park House and in the 1930s it was called the Wayside Inn. By 1930, railroad service had stopped and the train tracks were removed in Freestone.

By the mid-20th century, the property served as a plant nursery. The building, as well as the surrounding 22-acres, was purchased by Tom Golden and Jim Kidder in 1970. The building served as their private home. The home served as the "social headquarters" during the design and installation of the landmark installation art piece, Running Fence by Christo and Jeanne-Claude.

In 1974, the Sonoma County Landmarks Commission designated the Hinds Hotel as a historic landmark. The Hinds Hotel is a part of the Freestone Historic District.

== Architecture ==
A two-story wood-frame building, the hotel is built in the Gothic Revival style. It was originally built as an L-shaped building. Prior to 1902, a balcony was added to the building. The original three step platform in the front of the building was restored. The building is built using shiplap siding. Flat trim surrounds the six over six double hung sash windows. The entry doors on the lower floor are symmetrically placed and are embellished with stained glass. The side door entry has a single, paned door with colored glass sidelights and traces.

The gable has center gables in two main sections of the front facades. The roof is trimmed with a plain cornice and wide frieze board. The board extends down the corners to the trim around the top of the platform. There are Gothic windows under the center gables, comprising a central pointed arch glass door with narrower, shorter pointed arched windows at each side, which are topped with label molding.

== Gallery ==
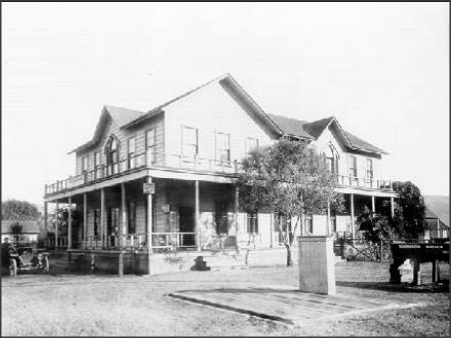
Hinds Hotel circa 1876

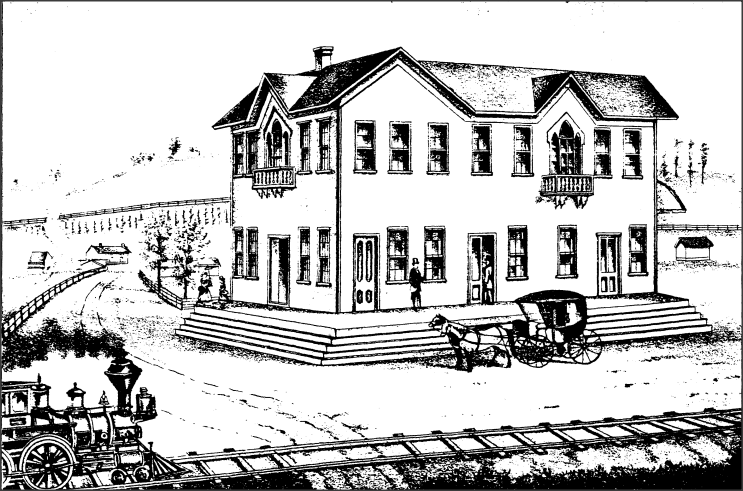
Hinds Hotel as illustrated in the Historical Atlas Map of Sonoma County California in 1877

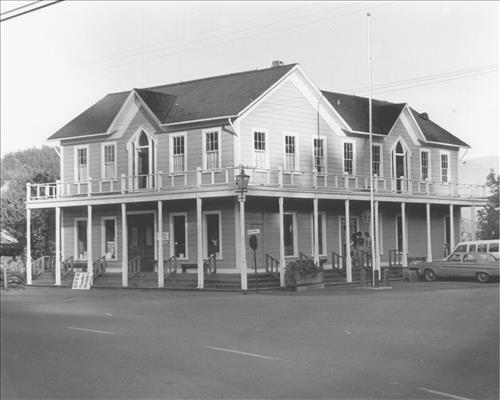
Hinds Hotel in 1979
