= Running Fence =

1976 art installation by Christo and Jeanne-Claude

Coordinates: 38°19′4″N 122°55′28″W

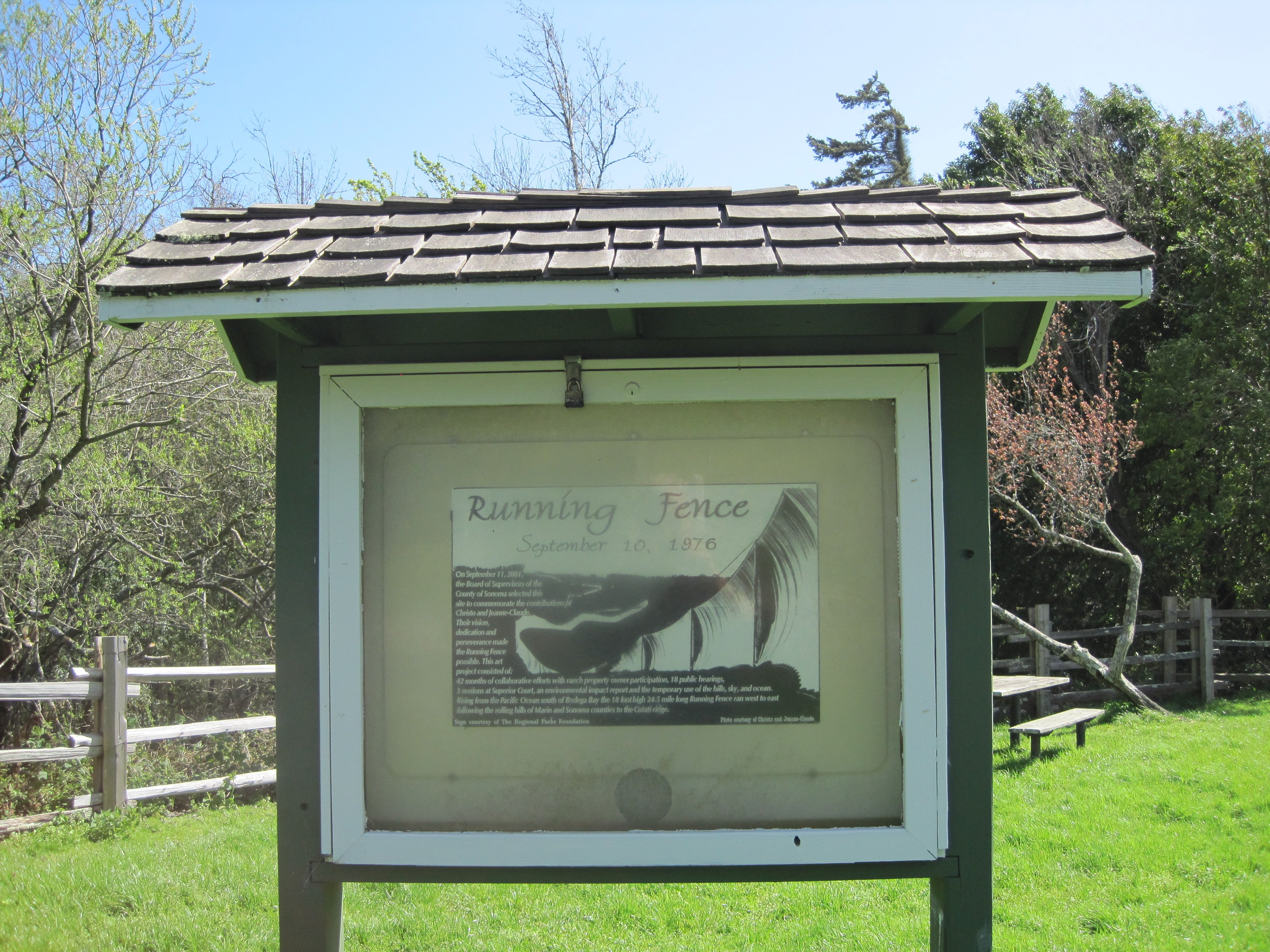
- Artist: Christo and Jeanne-Claude
- Year: September 10, 1976
- Type: Installation art

Running Fence was an installation art piece by Christo and Jeanne-Claude, which was completed in California on September 10, 1976. The art installation was first conceived in 1972, but the actual project took more than four years to plan and build. After it was installed, the builders removed it 14 days later, leaving no visible trace behind.

== Installation ==
The art installation consisted of a veiled fence 24.5 miles (39.4 km) long extending across the hills of Sonoma and Marin counties in northern California, United States. The 18-foot (5.5 m) high fence was made of 200,000 square meters (2,222,222 square feet) of heavy woven white nylon fabric, which created 2,050 panels, and was hung from steel cables by means of 350,000 hooks. The cables were supported by 2,050 steel poles (each: 6.4 meters / 21 feet long or 9 centimeters / 3.5 inches in diameter) embedded 1 meter (3 feet) into the ground, braced by steel guy wires (145 kilometers / 90 miles of steel cable), 14,000 earth anchors, and without any concrete.

The route of the fence began near U.S. Highway 101 and crossed 14 roads and the private property of 59 ranchers to reach the Pacific Ocean south of Bodega Bay. The fence entered the Pacific Ocean at a point about midway between the Estero Americano and the Estero de San Antonio, in northwestern Marin County. The art project required 42 months of collaborative efforts, 18 public hearings, 3 sessions at the Superior Courts of California, and the drafting of an Environmental Impact Report (EIR); the required EIR for the piece was 450 pages long.

All expenses for the temporary work of art were paid by Christo and Jeanne-Claude through the sale of studies, preparatory drawings and collages, scale models and original lithographs.

Originally conceived in 1972 as Curtains for West Berlin to block the view of the Berlin Wall, the project relocated to rural Sonoma and Marin Counties just south of the historic Russian settlements of Fort Ross and Port Rumyantsev at Bodega Bay in the Mexican bulwark of Rancho Americano. It is also said to have been partly inspired by fences demarcating the Continental Divide in Colorado. Christo emphasized that he considered Running Fence to encompass its social, legal, and technical dimensions.

An alternative location at Harmony, California for a 24.5 mile fence installation was scouted by Jeanne-Claude and Christo in 1973.

== Legacy ==
The piece is commemorated by historic markers at Watson School near Bodega, California and at State Route 1 in Valley Ford, California. In December 1976, the County Landmarks Commission, County of Sonoma designated the Valley Ford site (pole #7-33) as History Landmark #24.

The largest remaining intact and continuous section of the Running Fence hangs below the ceiling of the Rio Theater in Monte Rio, California.

Between April 1, 2010 through September 25, 2010, Christo and Jeanne-Claude: Remembering the Running Fence was on display at the Smithsonian American Art Museum. The exhibition comprised over 350 archival and related works and photographs, and visitors could touch the actual nylon fabric panels and steel poles from the original work of art.

The Charles M. Schulz Museum in Santa Rosa has a permanent exhibit on Christo featuring a portion of fabric from the Running Fence. Schulz's Peanuts comic strip featured Christo's art and the Running Fence in 1978.

== Documentary ==
The piece was the subject of a 1978 documentary film Running Fence by Albert and David Maysles. The film includes scenes showing the local response to the project, which ranged from excitement to resentment and active protest. Several Californians including Expressionist painter Byron Randall protested the piece on the grounds of both land infringement and lack of artistic merit; however others appreciated the beauty of the work and in the end the project was completed.

== Gallery ==
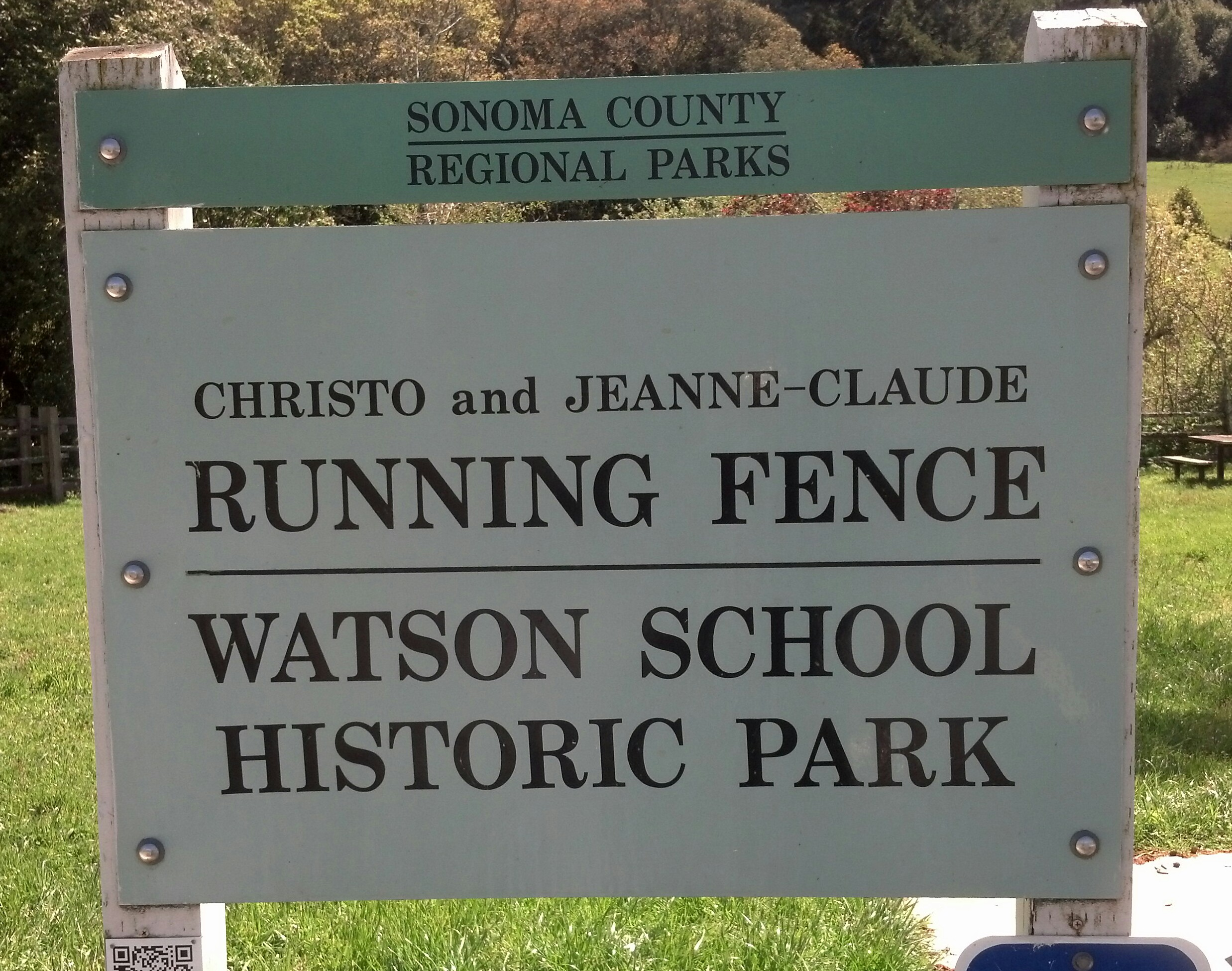
Sign at Watson School

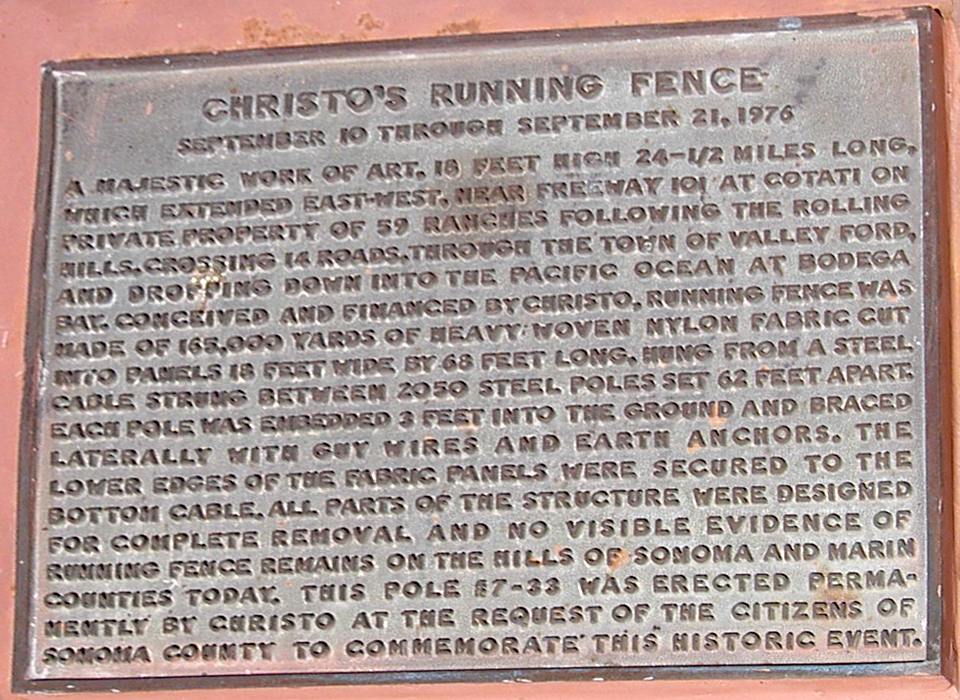
One of two commemorative markers in Valley Ford, California

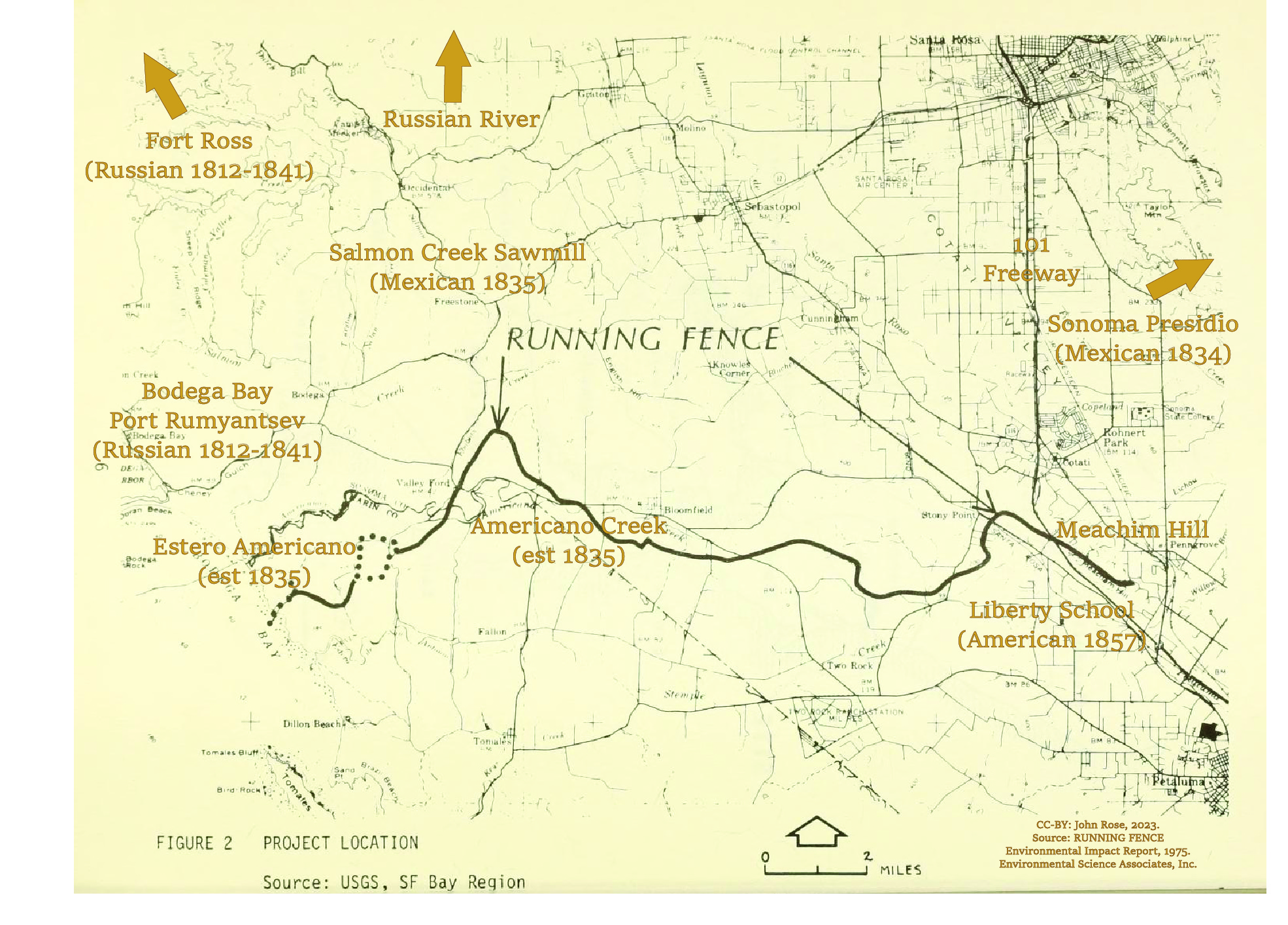
The Running Fence's 24.5 mile course with Russian, Mexican, and American historic features noted.

== See also ==
- Site-specific art
- Land art
- Public art
- List of Sonoma County Regional Parks facilities
- Sonoma County Historic Landmarks and Districts
