= St. Teresa of Avila Church (Bodega, California) =

Catholic church in California, US

Saint Teresa of Avila Church
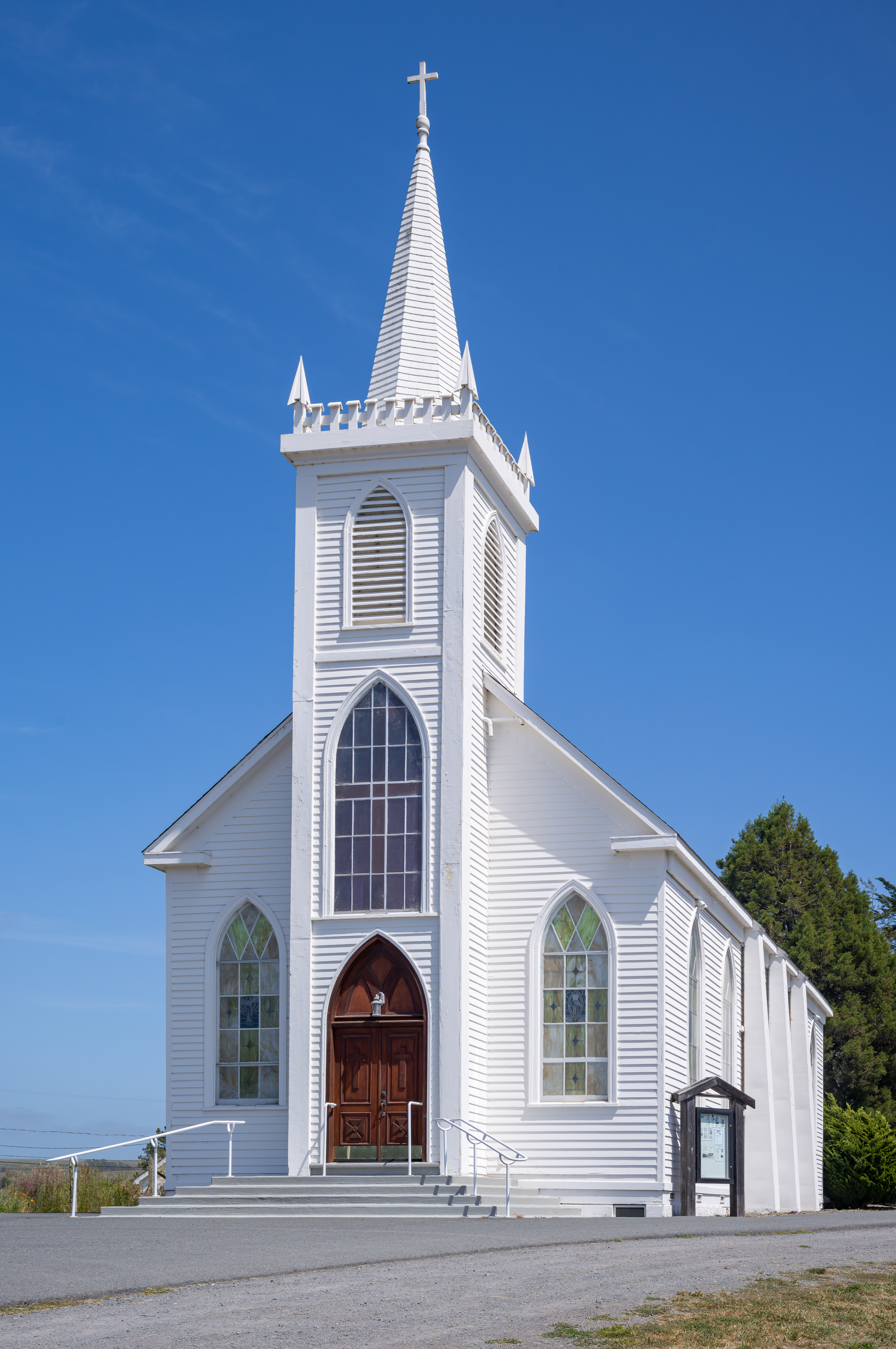
- Saint Teresa of Avila Church
- Interactive map of Saint Teresa of Avila Church
- 38°20′46″N 122°58′21″W
- Location: Bodega, California, United States

History
- Built: 1859

Site notes
- Governing body: Diocese of Santa Rosa in California (Catholic Church)

California Historical Landmark
- Reference no.: 820

Saint Teresa of Avila Church is a Catholic church in Bodega, California. The white, wooden church with a steeple sits on a hilltop overlooking Bodega Highway.

== History ==
The church was built by shipbuilders in 1860 on land donated by Jasper O’Farrell. It was named after St. Teresa of Avila by local Spanish and Portuguese immigrants. Archbishop Alemany dedicated the church on June 2, 1861. Originally it was part of the Archdiocese of San Francisco. Today the parish belongs to the Diocese of Santa Rosa in California. A California Historical Landmark, the church is still in use today and is the oldest church in continuous use in Sonoma County.

In 1872, the original building was expanded by cutting the church in half, pulling the two ends of the small church away from each other, and then building new ceiling, walls, and stained glass windows to close the gap.

In 1886, an 850-pound cast iron bell was added to the belfry, but it was removed when it was discovered that it was too heavy for the structure.

Also notable, the church interior has no center aisle, but rather two side aisles.

Ansel Adams made the church the subject of a black and white photograph in 1953. The church is located directly next to the Bodega schoolhouse, which was the setting for the schoolhouse scene in Alfred Hitchcock's 1963 film, The Birds. The church was also seen in the film and Hitchcock attended services in the church.
