= Windsor historical landmarks =

This is a list of 10 historic sites in Windsor, California which have been designated as sites on the Town of Windsor Historic Register by Windsor's town council.

There are a number of historic places in Windsor.

Windsor has a local historical society, the Windsor Historical Society, which was founded in 1959 and operates a local history museum. The society publishes a local history walking tour guide.

Sonoma County, California designates historic landmarks in unincorporated areas outside towns and cities of the county.

There is one historic site in Windsor which is listed on the National Register of Historic Places: the Cunningham-Hembree Estate, which was listed in 2018. (Note: As determined by comparing locations of all National Register of Historic Places listings in Sonoma County, California to Windsor's boundaries.)

There are two historic sites near Windsor which were designated by Sonoma County and by the National Register of Historic Places: the Mount Weske Stables, just outside the north border of Windsor, and the James H. and Frances E. Laughlin House, south of Windsor.

== Windsor historical landmarks ==
	Landmark/ APN	Location	Image	Dates	Notes
1	Masonic Temple	371 Windsor River Road; 38.547423°N 122.816315°W 38.54745°N 122.81637°W		1898 built	First constructed in 1898, rebuilt after fire in 1905, then damaged by the earthquake of 1906 and rebuilt!
2	Gutchell Residence	321 Windsor River Road; 38.547481°N 122.815290°W; 38.54752°N 122.81526°W		1890 built 1975 SCHL-designated	1890 home used as the telephone exchange from at least 1918.
3	Cunningham House	9229 Foxwood Drive; 38.552392°N 122.810816°W		c.1850 built	The oldest known structure in Windsor.
4	Hembree House	9225 Foxwood Drive; 38.552721°N 122.810604°W		1931 built	Called “Mattapan”, an Indian word meaning “I sit down” according to family members.
5	Bell Ranch House	294 Windsor River Road 38.547575°N 122.814506°W; 38.54708°N 122.81471°W		1860 built	House reflecting Greek Revival influence, built in 1860.
6	Heritage Bay Tree; 162-041-001	Cerrada Court/Foothill Drive; 38.55812°N 122.79302°W		It may be a large Umbellularia californica (California bay laurel) tree.|-	
7	Shiloh Cemetery; 065-260-002	7100 Windsor Road; 38.525444°N 122.815073°W			Originally a Methodist church site, the first burials are believed to have occurred as early as 1836. The church burned in 1867 and the Shiloh Cemetery Association was formed in 1885.
8	David H. DuVander House	295 Windsor River Road; 38.547505°N 122.814937°W 38.54754°N 122.81492°W			Late 1880s house believed used in the undertaking business.
9	Odd Fellows Hall; Odd Fellows Osceola No. 215.	337 Windsor River Road; 38.547581°N 122.813433°W			When built in 1933, the most substantial building in Windsor. The lodge is upstairs and a grocery store is located downstairs.
10	Old Redwood Highway Palm Trees	Old Redwood Highway: 1. 8635 Old Redwood Hwy, north tree (38.54506°N 122.80400°W); 2. 8635 Old Redwood Hwy, south tree (38.54501°N 122.80391°W); 3. 15 Bluebird Dr., north tree (38.54470°N 122.80320°W); 4. 15 Bluebird Dr., center tree (38.54460°N 122.80302°W); 5. 15 Bluebird Dr., south tree (38.54451°N 122.80283°W); 6. 8499 Old Redwood Hwy, north tree (38.54403°N 122.80185°W); 7. 8499 Old Redwood Hwy, center tree (38.54393°N 122.80166°W); 8. 8499 Old Redwood Hwy, south tree (38.54384°N 122.80147°W); 9. 8499 Old Redwood Hwy, center (transplanted) (Note: Palm tree 9 appears to be gone, per Google Satellite and Streetview and Bing Satellite and Streetside views. Replacements are scattered around the parking area, but none have background matching photo, and there is no palm tree in center.); 10. 8465 Old Redwood Hwy, farthest north (38.54374°N 122.80127°W); 11. 8465 Old Redwood Hwy, center (38.54365°N 122.80108°W); 12. 8465 Old Redwood Hwy, farthest south (38.54355°N 122.80089°W); 13. 8465 Old Redwood Hwy, frontage btwn Bldgs 200 & 500 (38.54340°N 122.80071°W); 14. 8465 Old Redwood Hwy, frontage north of Bldg 200, farthest north (38.54328°N 122.80046°W); 15. 8465 Old Redwood Hwy, frontage north of Bldg 200, farthest south (38.54318°N 122.80032°W); 16. 8465 Old Redwood Hwy, along Bldg 200 (38.54311°N 122.80016°W); 17. 8465 Old Redwood Hwy, south frontage of Bldg 200 (38.54305°N 122.79992°W)			17 palm trees designated as "landmark trees"

== See also ==
- National Register of Historic Places listings in Sonoma County, California
- List of cemeteries in California
