= Nicholas Carriger Estate =

Historic house in California, United States

- U.S. National Register of Historic Places
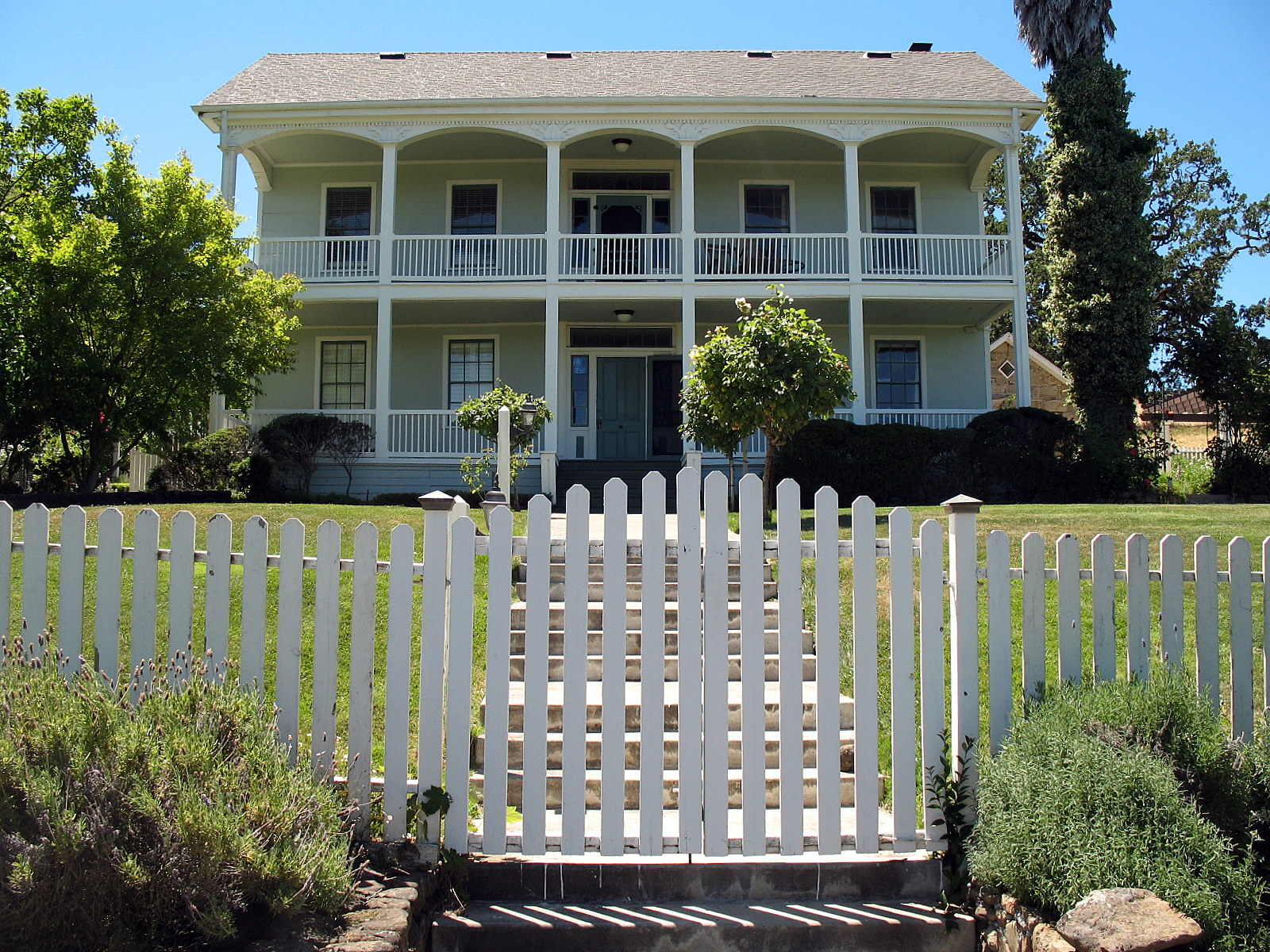

- Location within California Location within the United States
- Location: 18880 Carriger Rd., Sonoma, California, United States
- Coordinates: 38°17′48″N 122°30′43″W
- Built: 1847
- Architectural style: Greek Revival
- NRHP reference No.: 01001234
- Added to NRHP: November 16, 2001

The Nicholas Carriger Estate (16-acre) is a collection of buildings located in Sonoma, California. The estate consists of three buildings: the main house built in 1847, a small house, which is a replica of the main house, built in 1860, and a winery, built in 1875. The main house and the Little Carriger house fall in the architectural Greek Revival style. There also is a locally quarried "candy rock" stone small building next to the main house that may have been used as an ice house. The everflowing Yulupa Spring, which supplied water to the houses and is still flowing, is a short walk along a hillside pathway from the main house. In 1979 the estate was designated a Sonoma County Historic Landmark, and in 2001, it was added to the National Register of Historic Places.

Nicholas Carriger built the property after traveling west with his family as a settler of California. Carriger was welcomed to the area by Mariano Guadalupe Vallejo. Vallejo and Carriger would remain lifelong friends. Carriger chose his estate property based on the scenery and the good drainage of the area. He purchased the property, 1,000 acres, from Vallejo. It was on this land that Carriger was reportedly the first American to grow wine grapes in Sonoma Valley. Cattle, purchased from Vallejo, also grazed the property. After an absence to participate in the Gold Rush, Carriger returned after great success finding gold, to complete the main house in 1850. In 1875, he began construction of his winery building with a large celebration where he laid the cornerstone and a box containing personal items relating to the Carriger family and Sonoma. Nicholas Carriger died in 1885 at his home and is buried with family and other notable pioneers of the area at the Sonoma's Mountain Cemetery. After the death of his wife, Mary Ann Wardlow Carriger, in 1891, the property remained in the Carriger family until sold by daughter Levisa Carriger Lewis.
