= Rio Theater (Monte Rio) =

Movie theater in Monte Rio, California, US

Coordinates: 38°28′3″N 123°0′38″W

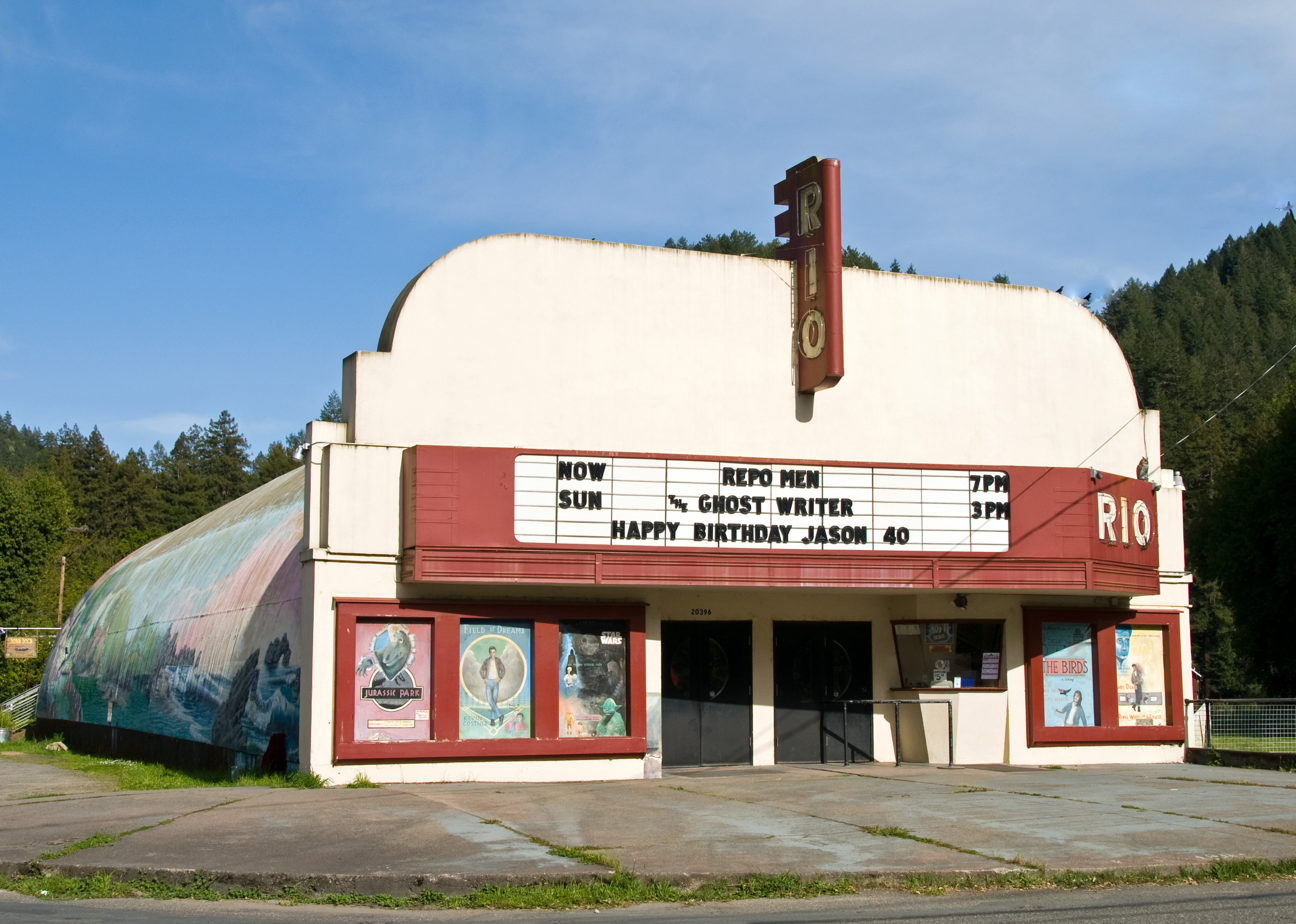
Rio Theater

The Rio Theater is a single-screen movie theater in Monte Rio, California, United States. The largest extant piece of Christo and Jeanne-Claude's Running Fence drapes the ceiling of the theater's auditorium.

== History ==
Sid Bartlett, a Monte Rio merchant, bought a surplus Quonset hut from the U.S. Navy in 1949 and began converting it into a movie theater, which opened the following year. In 1972, the Theater was leased to Dr.Robert Newport and operated as Cinema Rio until 1974. Gregory Hill was general manager. It was known as "a dollar house" which was the price of admission, and featured four separate programs including a selections from the Janus Classical Catalogue, popular films, a kids program of cartoons with the entire Three Stooges repertoire and an Advant Guard Cinema curated by Ken Valentine. Wibur Paola, a local artist, did the marquee.

Bartlett later sold the Rio to Thomas Dean, who was a personal friend of Christo Vladimirov Javacheff and Jeanne-Claude Denat de Guillebon. Christo and Jeanne-Claude erected their 24.5 mile long Running Fence across Sonoma and Marin counties in September 1976. When it was ready to be dismantled, Dean obtained a section and installed it above the seats in his theater. The Rio continues to house the largest intact and continuous piece of the Christos' Running Fence in the world.

The Rio fell into foreclosure in 1984 and was acquired by an Israeli family, the Mandelbrots, who hired a manager to run it. In January 1993 it was purchased by Monte Rio residents Don and Suzi Schaffert. The Schafferts had intended to allow the Mandelbrots' manager to continue overseeing the theater until they learned he was allowing a friend to live in the Rio and engage in illicit activities. After the Schafferts asked the manager to evict his friend, the two men vandalized the interior by spray-painting the screen and damaging the electrical panel.

The Schafferts also were faced with a $4,000 fine for allowing neighborhood children to perform chores in the Rio in exchange for a movie ticket, a hot dog and a drink. A judge reduced the fine by 50 percent after the parents and other residents of Monte Rio commended the Schafferts for giving the children a useful activity they enjoyed. According to the Schafferts, the children claim that the theater is haunted by a female ghost.

== Kickstarter campaign ==
In March 2013 the Schafferts launched a Kickstarter campaign to raise $60,000 to purchase the digital projection equipment necessary for the theater to continue showing first-run films. The campaign reached its goal on May 1, 2013, with 440 backers, including a $500 donation from actor Zach Braff.
