= James H. and Frances E. Laughlin House =

- U.S. National Register of Historic Places
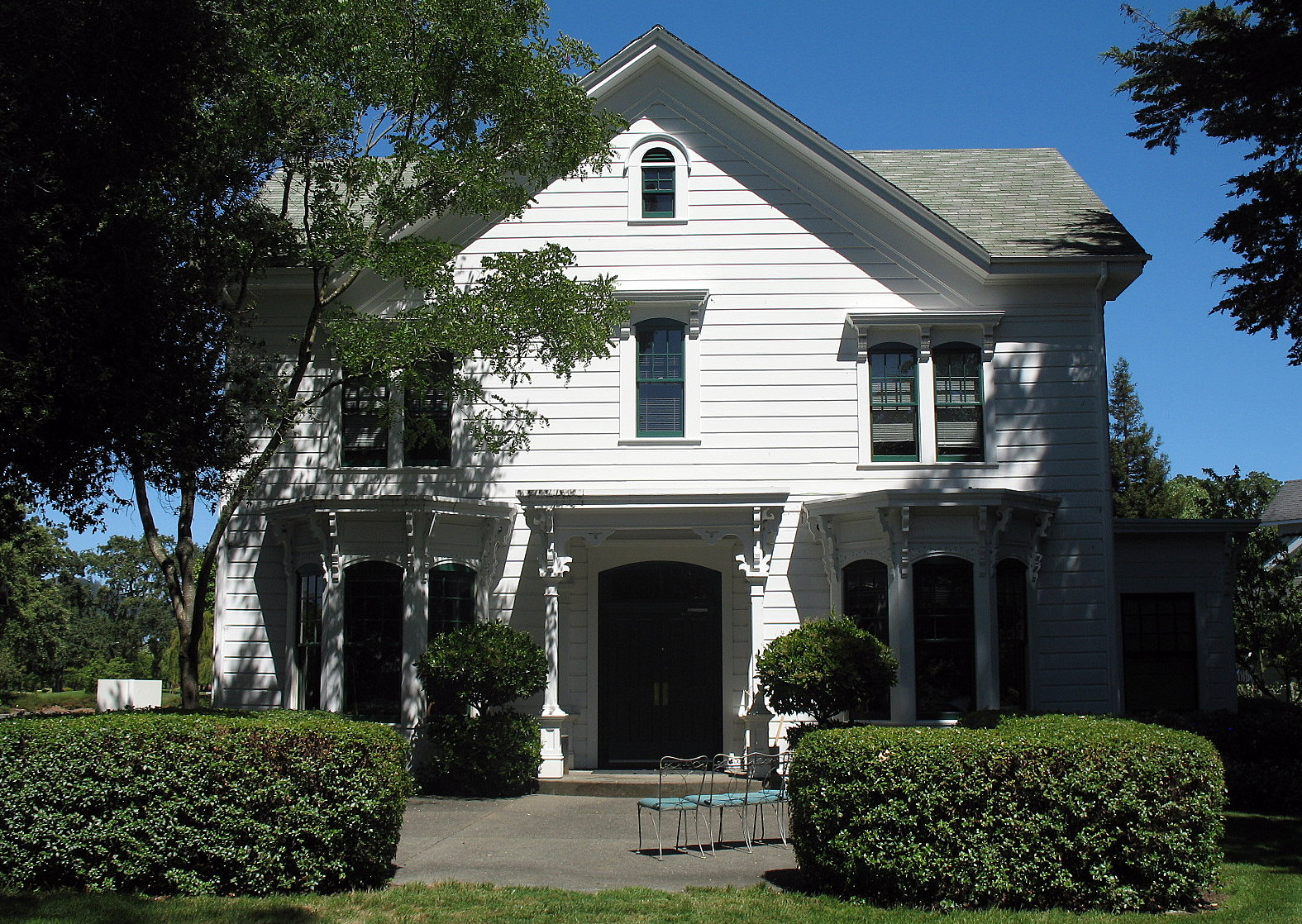

- Location within California
- Location: Southeast of Windsor, California on Lone Redwood Rd.
- Coordinates: 38°30′46″N 122°47′02″W
- Area: 8.5 acres (3.4 ha)
- Built: c.1876
- Built by: J.T. Ludwig
- Architectural style: Greek Revival, Italianate
- NRHP reference No.: 79000563
- Added to NRHP: April 26, 1979

The James H. and Frances E. Laughlin House, in Sonoma County, California, near Windsor, was built around 1876. It has also been known as Shady Farm. The listing includes four contributing buildings and a contributing structure. It was listed on the National Register of Historic Places in 1979.

It was designed and built by builder J.T. Ludwig, who had his own lumberyard and manufactured his own bricks.

It includes Greek Revival and Italianate elements.

== See also ==
- Windsor historical landmarks
