= Watson School =

- U.S. National Register of Historic Places
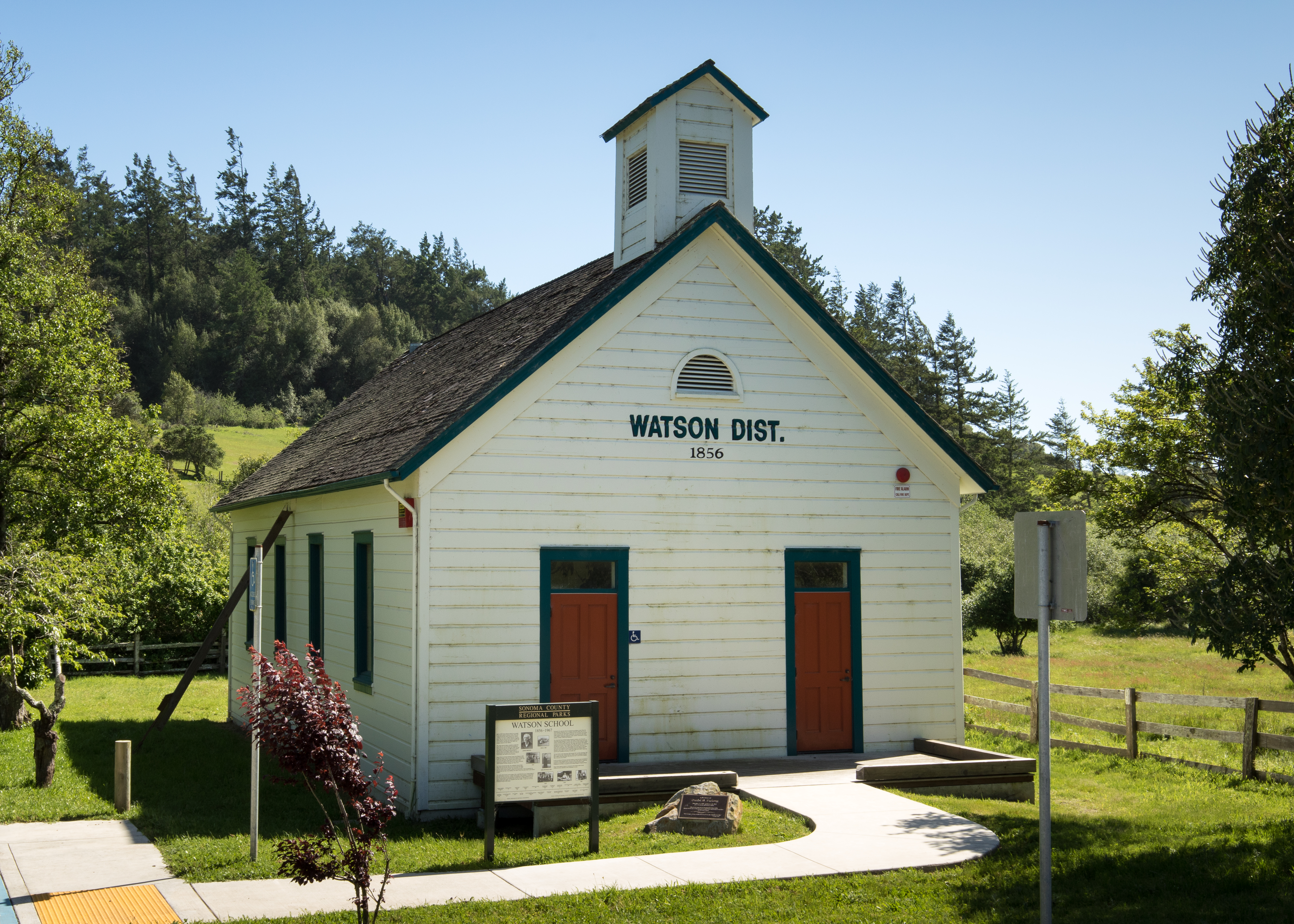
- Watson School

- Location within California Location within the United States
- Nearest city: Bodega, California
- Coordinates: 38°21′21″N 122°56′18″W
- Area: less than one acre
- Built: 1856
- Architectural style: Greek Revival
- NRHP reference No.: 78000800
- Added to NRHP: August 18, 1978

Watson School is a Sonoma County Regional Parks Department historic park, covering approximately 0.75 acres (0.30 ha), located about 2 miles (3.2 km) east of Bodega, California, on the south side of the road, at 15000 Bodega Highway in Sonoma County, California, United States. It was listed on the National Register of Historic Places in 1978.

== History ==
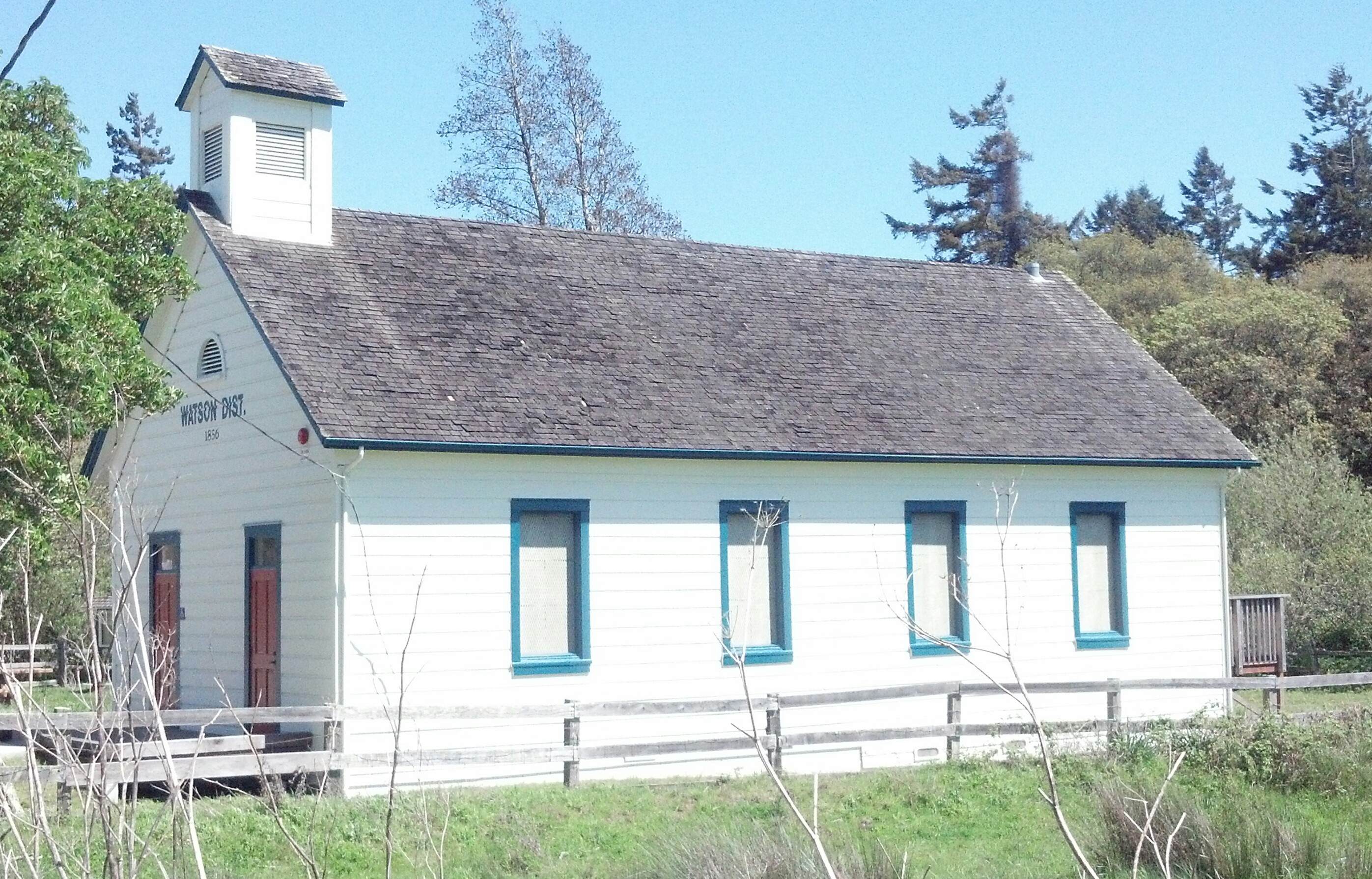
Watson School

The land was donated by James Watson in 1855, for a school to serve the communities of Freestone, Bodega, and Valley Ford. Open from 1856 to 1967, it served as a public school for 111 years, longer than any other one room school in California. The schoolhouse remains today in its original condition on its original site.

In 1976, Watson School was named Sonoma County Landmark #23, and in 1978, it was placed on the National Register of Historic Places. The park is open from sunrise to sunset by a locked gate and features four picnic tables plus one toilet, along with signs commemorating the schoolhouse and the 1976 Running Fence art project by Christo and Jeanne-Claude.

In 2011, the Sonoma County Regional Parks Foundation received a donation from the estate of Daniel B. Furlong for the purpose of restoring the school. Furlong was part of the school's final graduating class, and many of his relatives also attended. A restoration project in the winter of 2011-2012 replaced the wood foundation with concrete and made other structural improvements.

Salmon Creek defines the southern boundary of the park.

== See also ==
- List of Sonoma County Regional Parks facilities
- Sonoma County Historic Landmarks and Districts
