= Bodega, California =

Unincorporated community in California, United States

Bodega Bodega Corners
- census-designated place
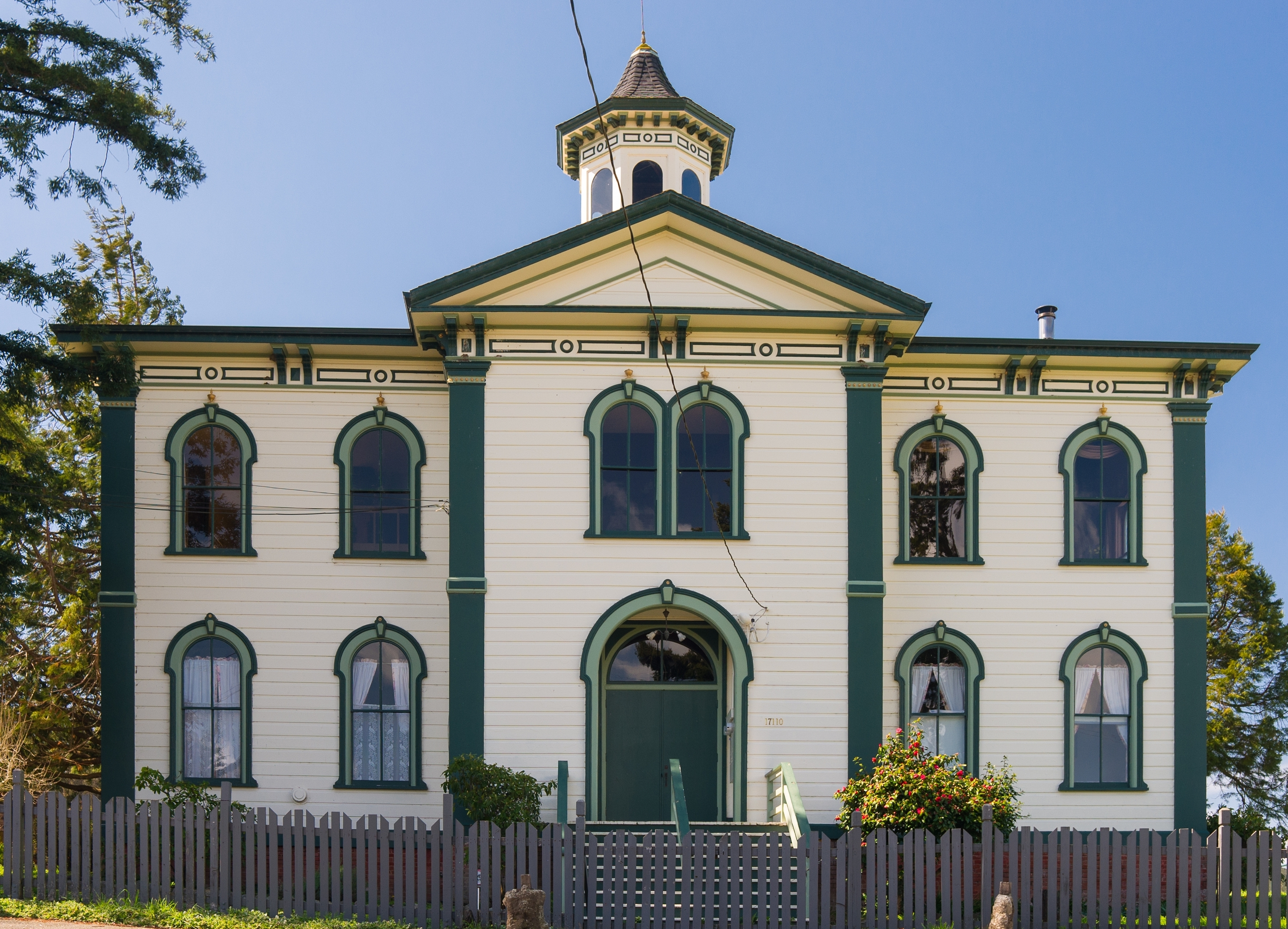
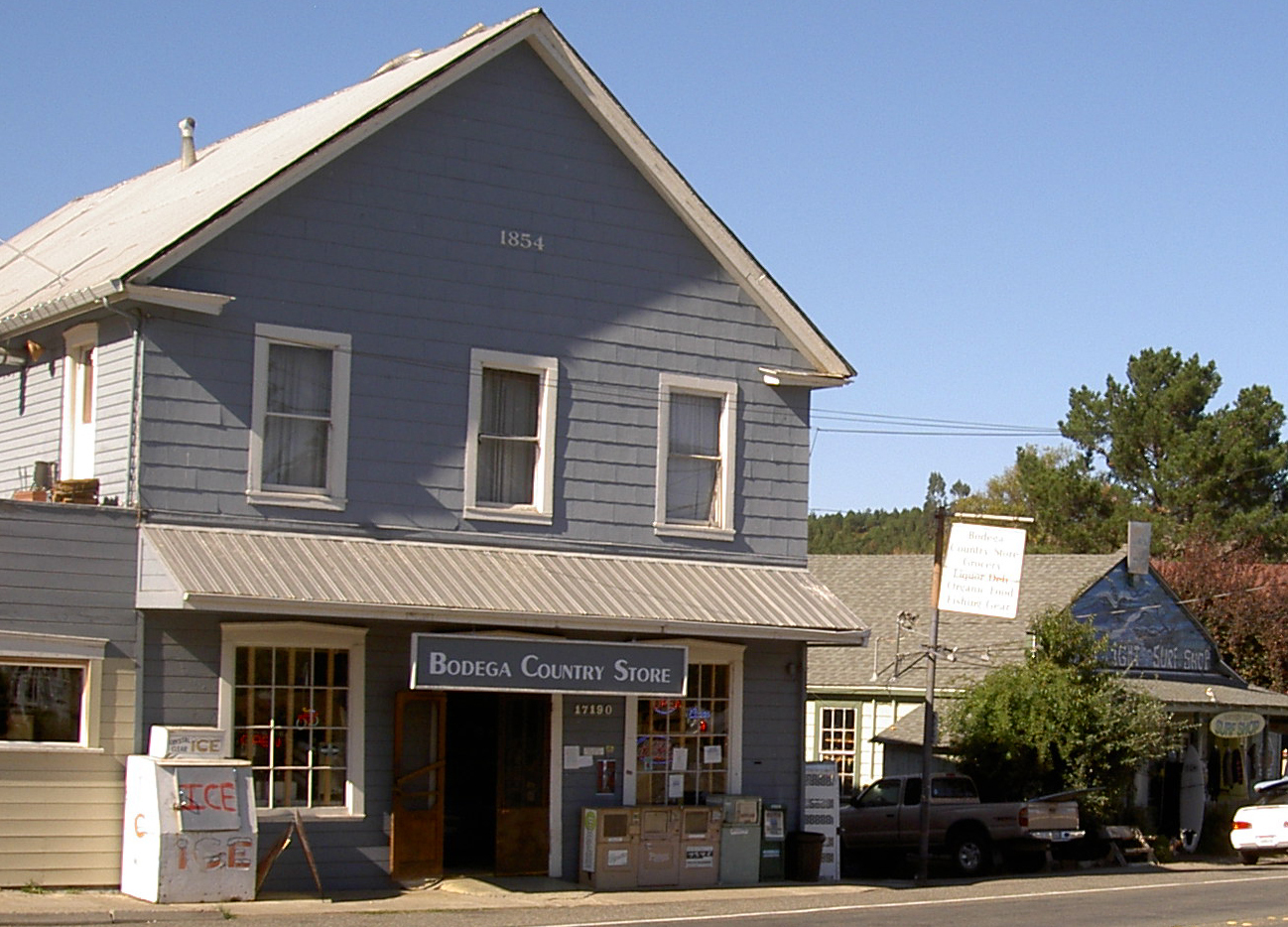
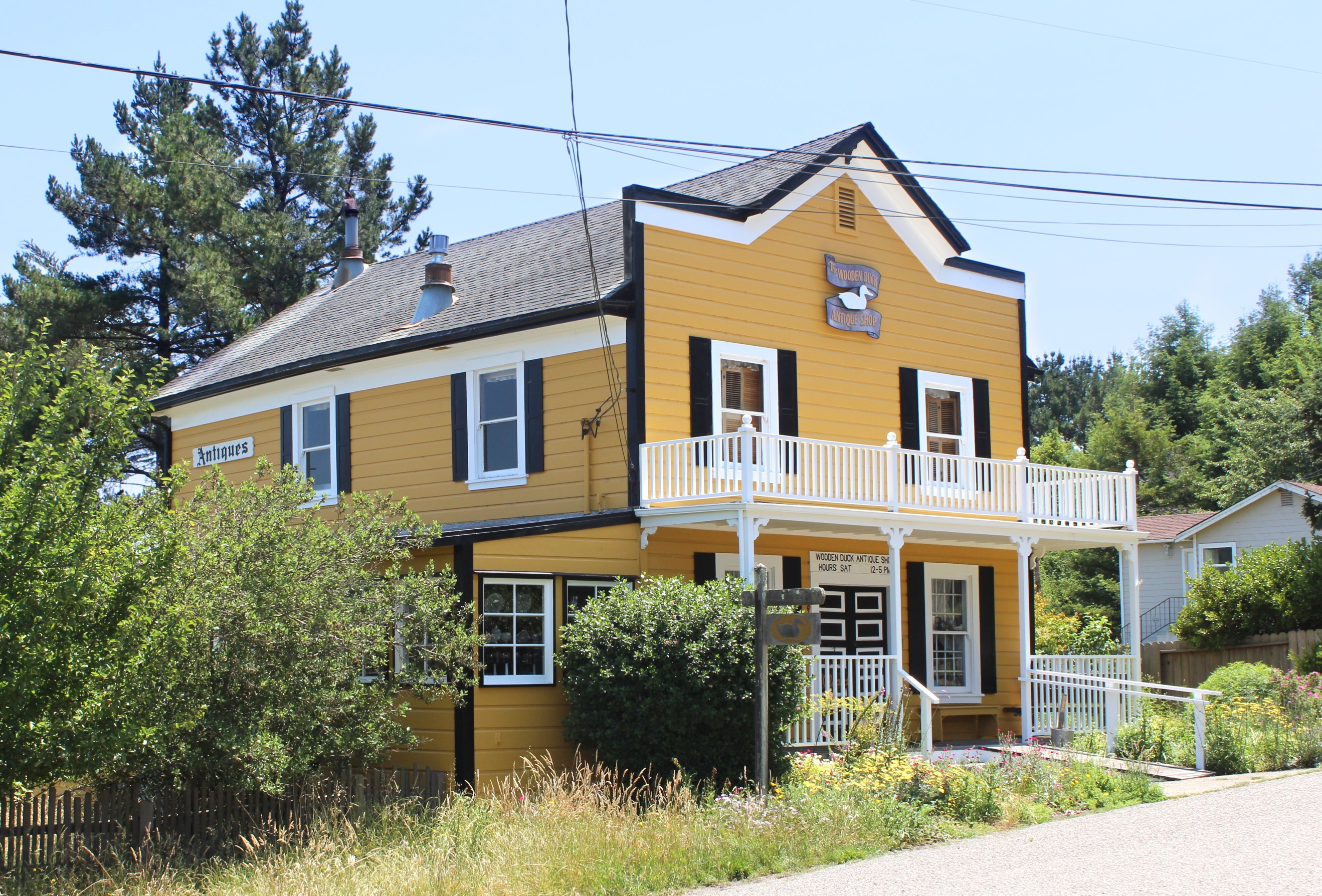
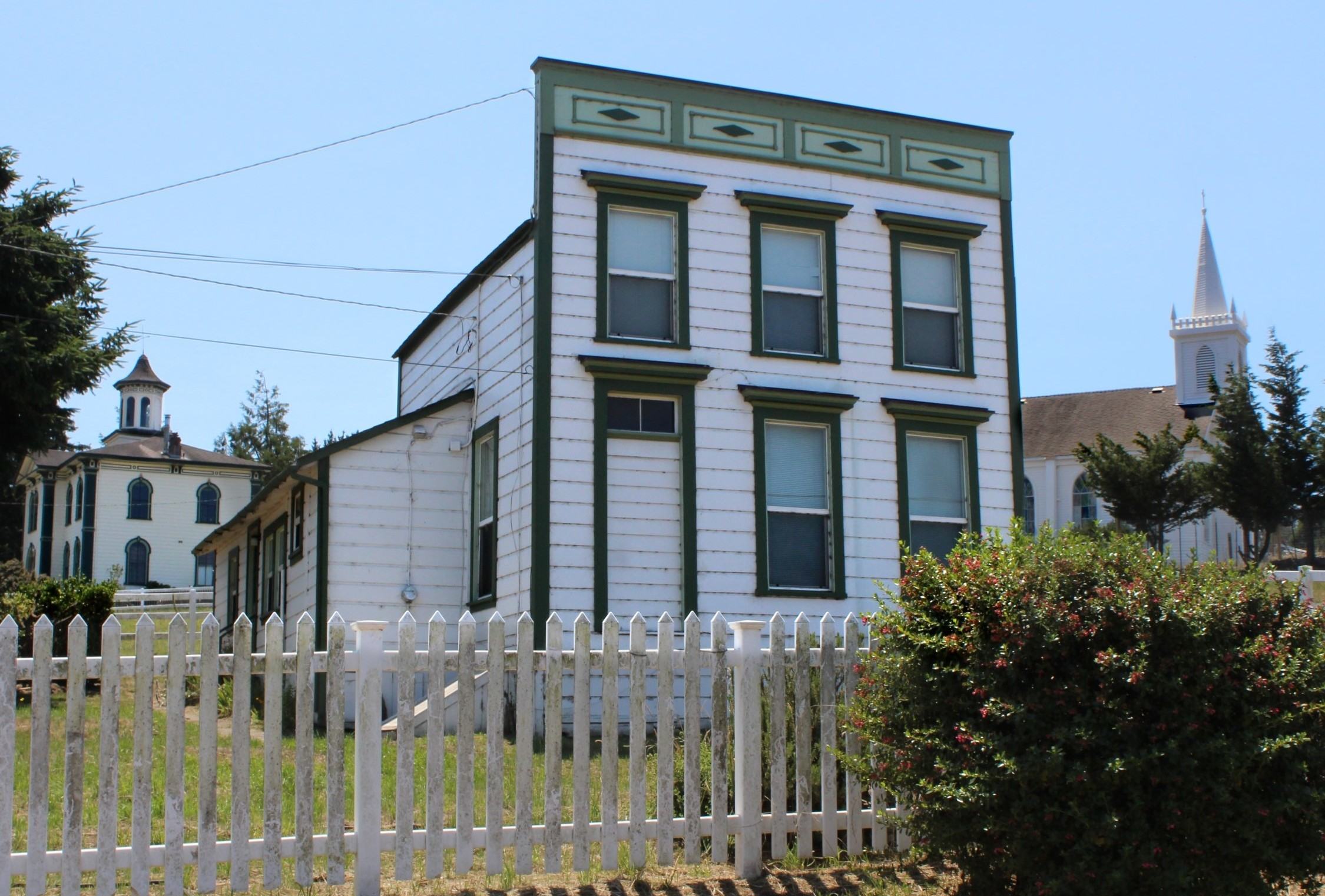
- The historic center of Bodega

- Location within the state of California
- Coordinates: 38°20′43″N 122°58′26″W
- Country: United States
- State: California
- County: Sonoma

Area
  - Total: 2.90 sq mi (7.52 km^{2})
  - Land: 2.90 sq mi (7.52 km^{2})
  - Water: 0 sq mi (0.00 km^{2}) 0%
- Elevation: 118 ft (36 m)

Population (2020)
  - Total: 211
  - Density: 72.7/sq mi (28.07/km^{2})
- Time zone: UTC-8 (PST)
  - Summer (DST): UTC-7 (PDT)
- ZIP code: 94922
- Area code: 707
- FIPS code: 06-07246
- GNIS feature ID: 219574

Bodega is an unincorporated community and census-designated place (CDP) in Sonoma County in the U.S. state of California. The town had a population of 211 as of the 2020 Census.

Bodega is located on Bodega Highway, approximately 5 mi (8 km) west of Freestone. Salmon Creek flows through the town.

== History ==
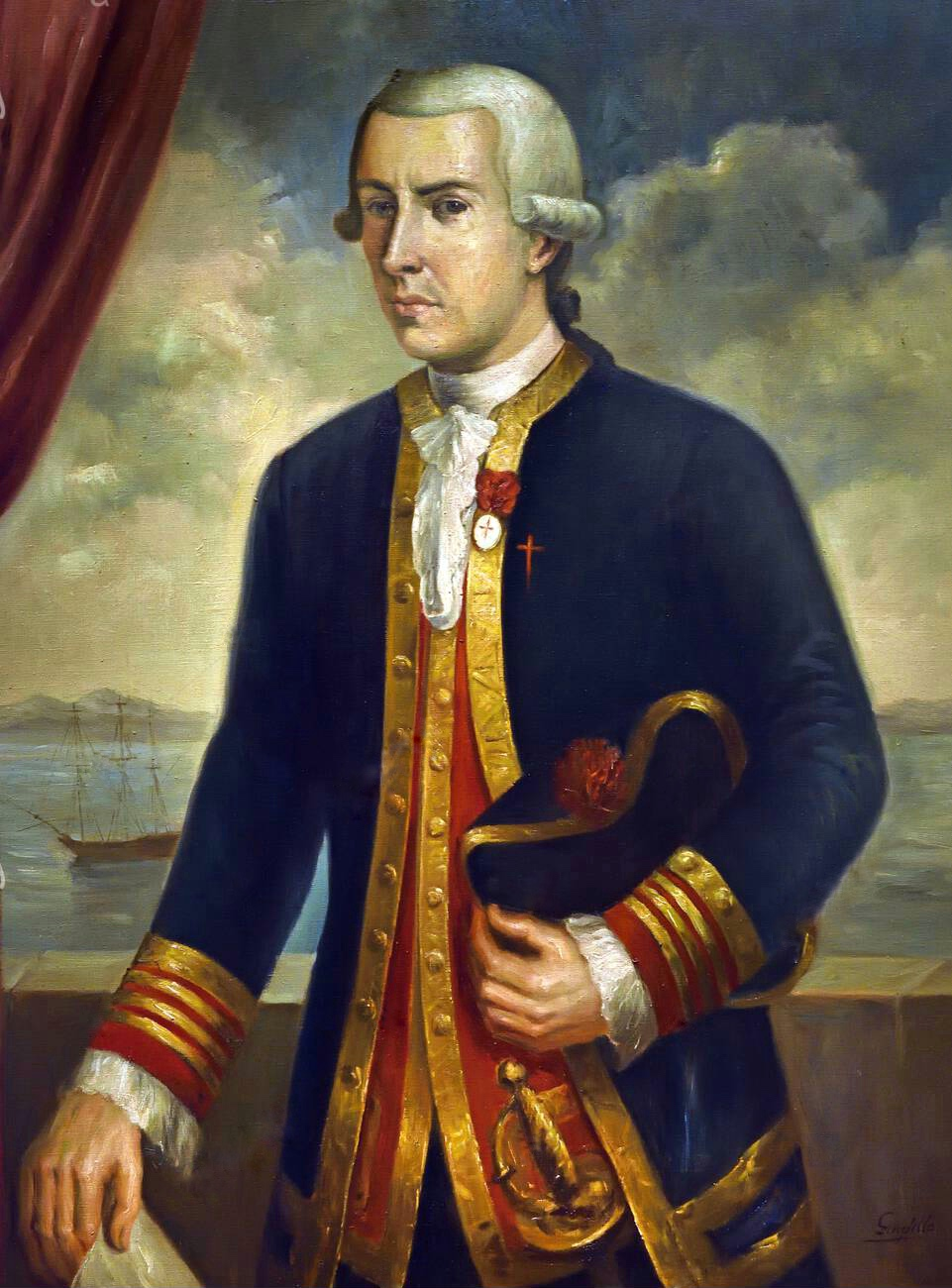
Bodega is named after Juan Francisco de la Bodega y Quadra, who explored Bodega Bay in 1775.

The town of Bodega was known historically as Bodega Corners or Bodega Roads, to distinguish it from the Port of Bodega or Bodega Bay, as it is known today, which is about 4 miles (6 km) from Bodega. Bodega and Bodega Bay are named for discoverer of the bay, Juan Francisco de la Bodega y Quadra, who first sailed into the harbor in 1775. There were formerly two Coast Miwok villages in the area: one (called Kennekono) sited near the current town and another (called Suwutenne) further north. The first Europeans in the area were Russians who established temporary settlements at Bodega Bay and the Salmon Creek Valley, in the vicinity of Bodega, in 1809.

In 1843, Captain Stephen Smith established the first West Coast lumber mill near Bodega. Around the same time, John A. Sutter bought land from the Russians, an area that included Bodega. His land purchase included "some hunting rights, a small boat, several rusty cannons, and some old muskets." The town of Bodega traces its origins to 1853 when a saloon, a blacksmith's shop and a hotel were established. In 1859, shipbuilders constructed Saint Teresa of Avila Church. Open from 1856 to 1967, Watson School, once served as Bodega's school, and is located in a Sonoma County Regional Parks Department historic park about 2 miles (3 km) east of Bodega.

== Geography ==
According to the United States Census Bureau, the CDP covers an area of 2.9 square miles (8 km^{2}), all land. The Phacelia distans is known for blossoming in Bodega between April and June.

== Demographics ==
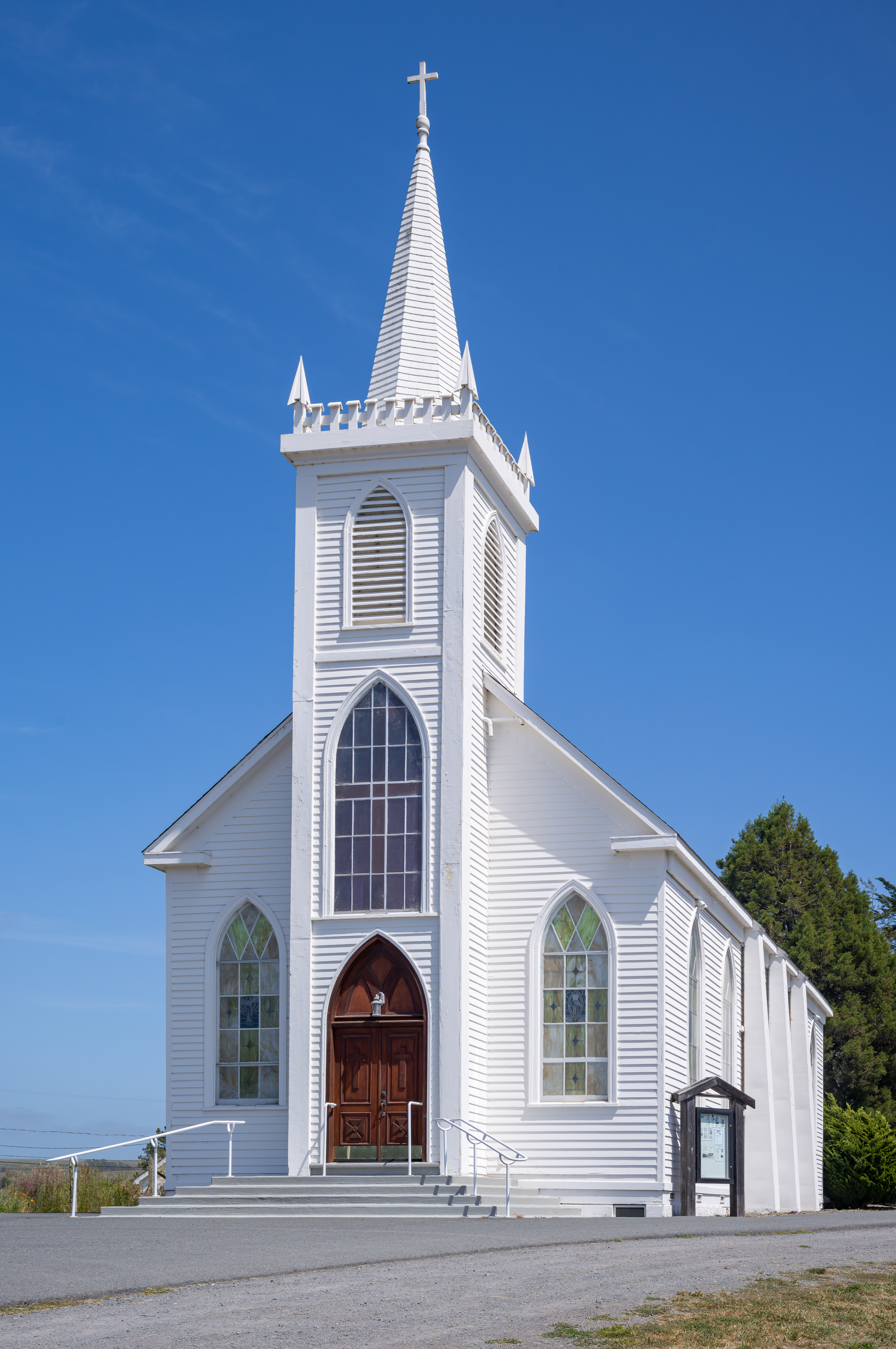
St. Teresa of Ávila Church.

Historical population
Census	Pop.	Note	%±
2010	220		—
2020	211		−4.1%
U.S. Decennial Census; 1860–1870 1880-1890; 1900 1910 1920; 1930 1940 1950; 1960 1970 1980; 1990 2000 2010; 2020

Bodega first appeared as a census designated place in the 2010 U.S. census.

=== Racial and ethnic composition ===
Bodega CDP, California – Racial and ethnic composition Note: the US Census treats Hispanic/Latino as an ethnic category. This table excludes Latinos from the racial categories and assigns them to a separate category. Hispanics/Latinos may be of any race.
Race / Ethnicity (NH = Non-Hispanic)	Pop 2010	Pop 2020	% 2010	% 2020
White alone (NH)	201	182	91.36%	86.26%
Black or African American alone (NH)	0	2	0.00%	0.95%
Native American or Alaska Native alone (NH)	2	0	0.91%	0.00%
Asian alone (NH)	2	1	0.91%	0.47%
Native Hawaiian or Pacific Islander alone (NH)	0	0	0.00%	0.00%
Other race alone (NH)	0	0	0.00%	0.00%
Mixed race or Multiracial (NH)	6	15	2.73%	7.11%
Hispanic or Latino (any race)	9	11	4.09%	5.21%
Total	220	211	100.00%	100.00%

=== 2020 census ===
As of the 2020 census, Bodega had a population of 211. The population density was 72.7 inhabitants per square mile (28.1/km^{2}). The median age was 58.3 years. The age distribution was 29 people (13.7%) under the age of 18, 7 people (3.3%) aged 18 to 24, 38 people (18.0%) aged 25 to 44, 62 people (29.4%) aged 45 to 64, and 75 people (35.5%) who were 65 years of age or older. For every 100 females there were 90.1 males, and for every 100 females age 18 and over there were 85.7 males age 18 and over.

0.0% of residents lived in urban areas, while 100.0% lived in rural areas.

The whole population lived in households. There were 92 households in Bodega, of which 30.4% had children under the age of 18 living in them. Of all households, 58.7% were married-couple households, 6.5% were cohabiting couple households, 19.6% were households with a male householder and no spouse or partner present, and 15.2% were households with a female householder and no spouse or partner present. About 15.2% of all households were made up of individuals and 7.6% had someone living alone who was 65 years of age or older. The average household size was 2.29. There were 67 families (72.8% of all households).

There were 108 housing units at an average density of 37.2 units per square mile (14.4 units/km^{2}), of which 92 (85.2%) were occupied and 14.8% were vacant. Of the occupied units, 63 (68.5%) were owner-occupied and 29 (31.5%) were occupied by renters. The homeowner vacancy rate was 0.0% and the rental vacancy rate was 0.0%.

Racial composition as of the 2020 census
Race	Number	Percent
White	186	88.2%
Black or African American	2	0.9%
American Indian and Alaska Native	0	0.0%
Asian	1	0.5%
Native Hawaiian and Other Pacific Islander	0	0.0%
Some other race	2	0.9%
Two or more races	20	9.5%
Hispanic or Latino (of any race)	11	5.2%

== Economy ==
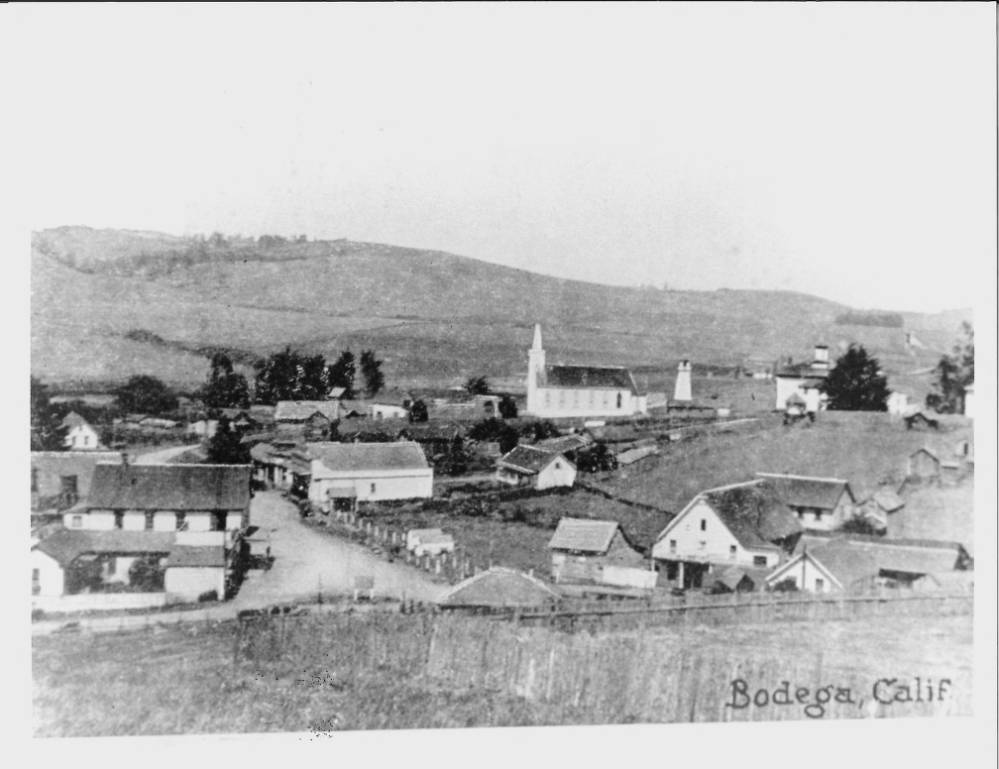
Bodega in the early 1900s

As of 1915, Bodega was serviced by Wells Fargo and Company, who provided express delivery service. Wells Fargo delivered fruits, vegetables, eggs, and butter to the region from Alameda County. The area also has a history of creameries, making milk and butter. The Bodega Cooperative Creamery was located in Bodega as of 1922.

Farming continues in the area, including Salmon Creek Ranch, which raises livestock and sells organic products. Bodega has a tourism industry, which includes the Sonoma Coast Villa, and art galleries and shops in the small "downtown" area.

== Arts and culture ==
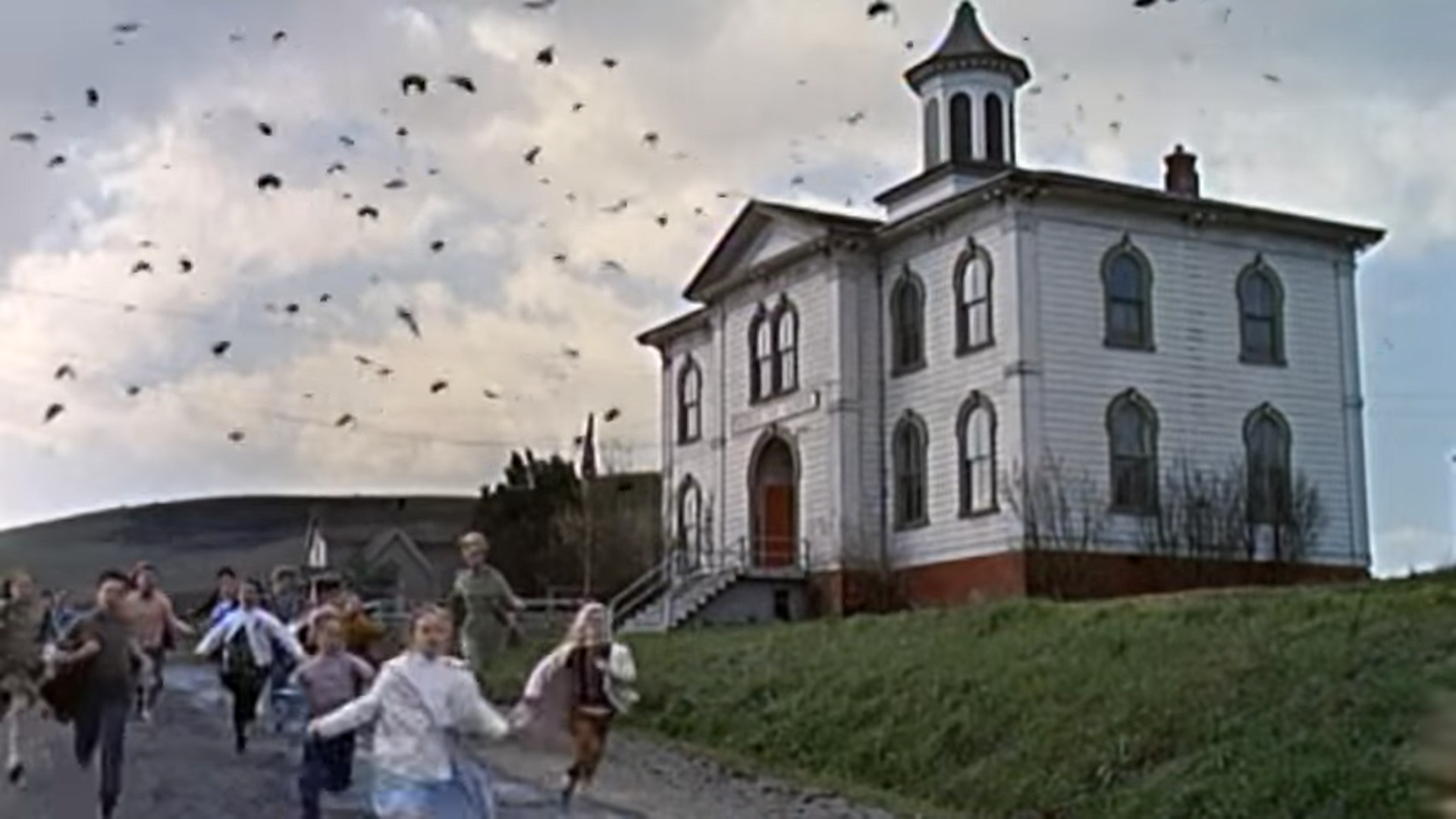
Scene from The Birds showing Potter School

In the 1970s, Bodega was home to a doll museum.

=== In popular culture ===
In 1963, some locations in Bodega were used for exterior filming in Alfred Hitchcock's film, The Birds. These locations were presented as being in the nearby shore village of Bodega Bay, where the film was set and most location shooting was done. Bodega's Potter School (now a private residence) was used as the Bodega Bay School in a key scene in the movie. A façade of a house was constructed just down the hill from the schoolhouse as the setting for the home of the character Annie Hayworth (Suzanne Pleshette). Bodega's general store also appeared "as itself", though it has since been moved from its original site.

== Government ==
In the California State Legislature, Bodega is in the 2nd Senate District and the 2nd Assembly District.

In the United States House of Representatives, Bodega is in California's 2nd congressional district, represented by Democrat Jared Huffman.

At the county level, Bodega is in Sonoma County's 5th supervisorial district.

== Education ==
The school districts are Harmony Union School District and West Sonoma County Union High School District.

== Infrastructure ==
=== Transportation ===
The main road through town is Bodega Highway, which runs east to Freestone and Sebastopol and south to State Route 1 less than 1 mi (2 km) away. State Route 1 provides access to the neighboring towns of Bodega Bay and Valley Ford.

The Mendocino Transit Authority provides bus service to Bodega. Routes 75 and 95 stop at Bodega two times a day. An eastbound one at 10:25 am, and the same one returning westbound at 4:55 pm.

== Notable person ==
Thomas Oliver Boggs was a resident for a brief period in Bodega, before leaving for New Mexico, where he witnessed the burial of Kit Carson. Boggs' papers are held in the collection of the Bancroft Library.

== See also ==
- Bodega Bay, California
- West coast lumber trade
