= Valley Ford, California =

Unincorporated community in California, United States

Valley Ford
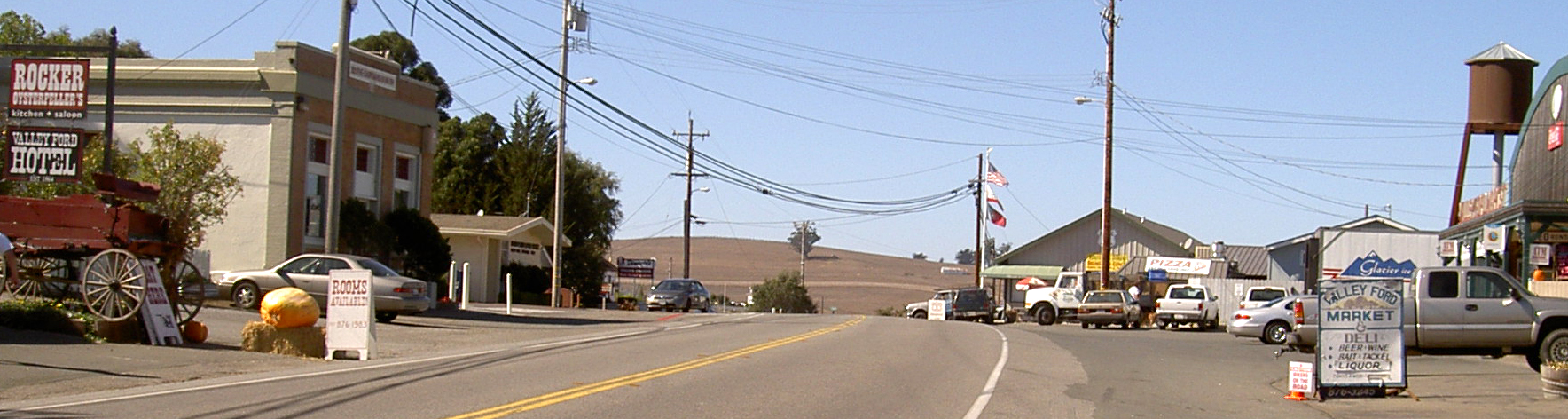
- Valley Ford in 2008

- Location within the state of California
- Coordinates: 38°19′5″N 122°55′27″W
- Country: United States
- State: California
- County: Sonoma

Area
  - Total: 2.642 sq mi (6.842 km^{2})
  - Land: 2.642 sq mi (6.842 km^{2})
  - Water: 0 sq mi (0 km^{2}) 0%
- Elevation: 52 ft (16 m)

Population (2020)
  - Total: 148
  - Density: 56.0/sq mi (21.6/km^{2})
- Time zone: UTC-8 (PST)
  - Summer (DST): UTC-7 (PDT)
- ZIP code: 94972
- Area code: 707
- FIPS code: 06-81778
- GNIS feature ID: 236972

Valley Ford is an unincorporated community and census-designated place (CDP) in western Sonoma County, California, United States. As of the 2020 census, Valley Ford had a population of 148. It is located on State Route 1 north of San Francisco. Like all of Sonoma County, Valley Ford is included in both the San Francisco Bay Area and the Redwood Empire.

The village lies just north of Americano Creek, approximately 5 mi (8 km) from the Pacific Ocean. It is 7 mi (11 km) north of Dillon Beach, 9 mi (14 km) east of the town of Bodega Bay and 20 mi (32 km) southeast of Jenner. The Estero Americano is protected by the Estero Americano State Marine Recreational Management Area.

== History ==
For millennia, the indigenous Coast Miwok and Pomo people have hunted, fished and gathered in the area. A Miwok village named Ewapalt has been documented in the Valley Ford area.

Europeans explored the coastline in the early 17th century but did not settle until 1812, when Russian fur traders came south from Alaska and built Fort Ross about 22 mi (40 km) northwest of Valley Ford. The Russians remained until 1841, when the area came under Mexican rule. In September 1850, California became a US state, the area was made part of Sonoma County.

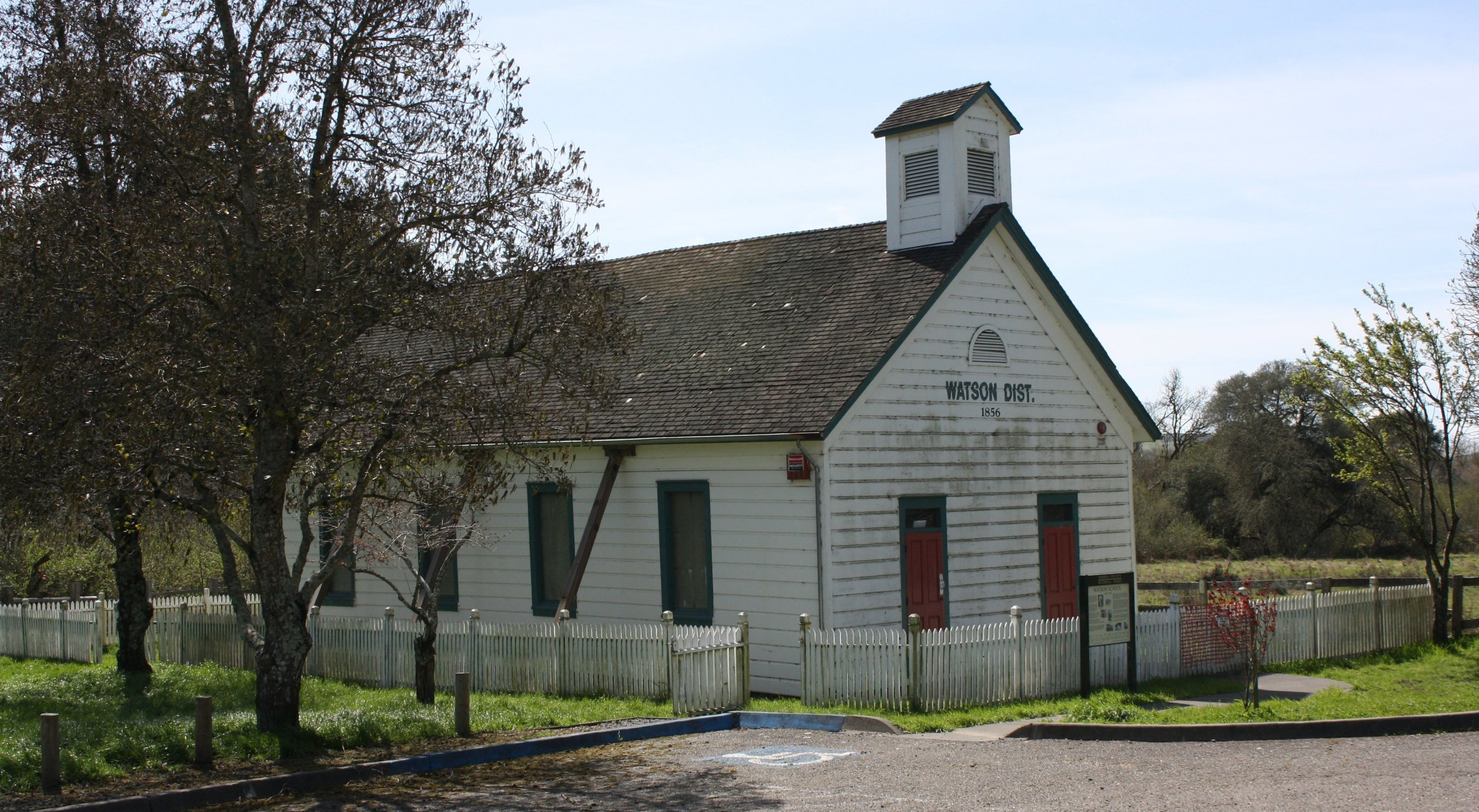
Watson School

Valley Ford had a grain mill in the 1850s. Starting in the 1876, Valley Ford was a stop on the North Pacific Coast Railroad connecting Cazadero to the Sausalito ferry, enabling local ranchers and fishers to export produce to San Francisco.

In 1976, Christo and Jeanne-Claude's installation art piece Running Fence passed through Valley Ford on its way from Cotati to Bodega Bay.

Open from 1856 to 1967, Watson School once served as Valley Ford's school, and is located in a Sonoma County Regional Parks Department historic park, approximately 3.5 miles north of Valley Ford.

== Geography ==
According to the United States Census Bureau, the CDP covers an area of 2.6 square miles (6.8 km^{2}), all land.

== Demographics ==
Historical population
Census	Pop.	Note	%±
2010	147		—
2020	148		0.7%
U.S. Decennial Census; 1860–1870 1880-1890; 1900 1910 1920; 1930 1940 1950; 1960 1970 1980; 1990 2000 2010; 2020

Valley Ford first appeared as a census designated place in the 2010 U.S. census.

=== Racial and ethnic composition ===
Valley Ford CDP, California – Racial and ethnic composition Note: the US Census treats Hispanic/Latino as an ethnic category. This table excludes Latinos from the racial categories and assigns them to a separate category. Hispanics/Latinos may be of any race.
Race / Ethnicity (NH = Non-Hispanic)	Pop 2010	Pop 2020	% 2010	% 2020
White alone (NH)	87	95	59.18%	64.19%
Black or African American alone (NH)	1	0	0.68%	0.00%
Native American or Alaska Native alone (NH)	0	0	0.00%	0.00%
Asian alone (NH)	0	1	0.00%	0.68%
Native Hawaiian or Pacific Islander alone (NH)	0	0	0.00%	0.00%
Other race alone (NH)	0	1	0.00%	0.68%
Mixed race or Multiracial (NH)	7	13	4.76%	8.78%
Hispanic or Latino (any race)	52	38	35.37%	25.68%
Total	147	148	100.00%	100.00%

=== 2020 census ===
The population at the 2020 United States census was 148. The population density was 56.0 inhabitants per square mile (21.6/km^{2}). The racial makeup of Valley Ford was 102 (68.9%) White, 0 (0.0%) African American, 2 (1.4%) Native American, 2 (1.4%) Asian, 0 (0.0%) Pacific Islander, 23 (15.5%) from other races, and 19 (12.8%) from two or more races. Hispanic or Latino of any race were 38 persons (25.7%).

The whole population lived in households. There were 53 households, out of which 12 (22.6%) had children under the age of 18 living in them, 31 (58.5%) were married-couple households, 6 (11.3%) were cohabiting couple households, 8 (15.1%) had a female householder with no partner present, and 8 (15.1%) had a male householder with no partner present. 11 households (20.8%) were one person, and 4 (7.5%) were one person aged 65 or older. The average household size was 2.79. There were 33 families (62.3% of all households).

The age distribution was 27 people (18.2%) under the age of 18, 5 people (3.4%) aged 18 to 24, 47 people (31.8%) aged 25 to 44, 40 people (27.0%) aged 45 to 64, and 29 people (19.6%) who were 65 years of age or older. The median age was 42.0 years. There were 74 males and 74 females.

There were 60 housing units at an average density of 22.7 units per square mile (8.8 units/km^{2}), of which 53 (88.3%) were occupied. Of these, 46 (86.8%) were owner-occupied, and 7 (13.2%) were occupied by renters.

== Nitrates in Groundwater ==
Warnings of high nitrate levels associated with surrounding dairy ranches have led some residents to drink, cook and even bathe with bottled water. Some dining establishments have resorted to relying on water delivered from Petaluma. In early 2017, the State Water Resources Control Board issued a warning that pregnant women and infants younger than 6 months should not consume the town's well water. The warning also cautioned against boiling, freezing or filtering the water.[7]

== Businesses ==
Valley Ford is home to antique stores, art galleries, curio shops and restaurants:

- Valley Ford Hotel, one of the few remaining buildings dating from the 19th century, now houses Rocker Oysterfeller's Kitchen & Saloon and six guest rooms.
- West County Design, a gallery for wood tables, polished concrete and other products of Sonoma County artisans,.

The Valley Ford Market features the regionally well-known Batemon's Meats.

- Valley Ford Construction Corporation, Valley Ford Construction Corporation, General Engineering.
- The headquarters of capo manufacturer Shubb is also in Valley Ford.
- Carolyn's Canvas manufactures a variety of canvas goods.

== Education ==
It is in the Shoreline Unified School District.
