= Cunningham-Hembree Estate =

- U.S. National Register of Historic Places
- Location within California
- Location: 9225 and 9229 Foxwood Dr., Windsor, California
- Coordinates: 38°33′08″N 122°48′40″W
- Built: c. 1850, 1931
- NRHP reference No.: 100002638
- Added to NRHP: July 9, 2018

The Cunningham-Hembree Estate, in Windsor, California, which includes two houses, was listed on the National Register of Historic Places in 2018.

== Cunningham House ==
The Cunningham House, built c. 1850, was listed by Windsor's town council as a Windsor historical landmark. It is the oldest known structure in Windsor. It is located at 9225 Foxwood Dr. (38.552392°N 122.810816°W).

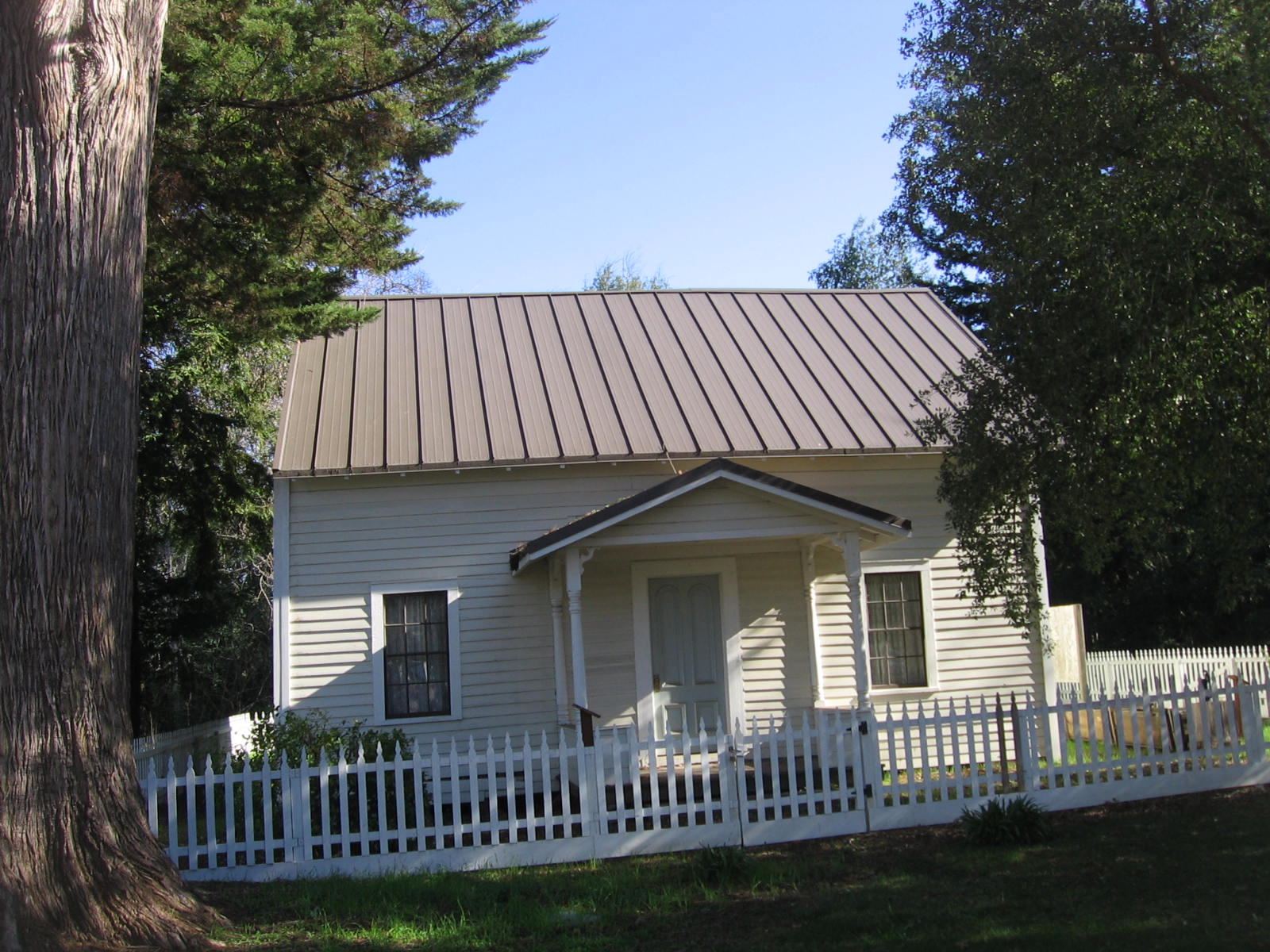
Cunningham House

== Hembree House ==
The Hembree House was built in 1931. It was listed by the town council, too. It has also been called “Mattapan”, an Indian word meaning “I sit down” according to family members. It is located at 9225 Foxwood Dr. (38.552721°N 122.810604°W).

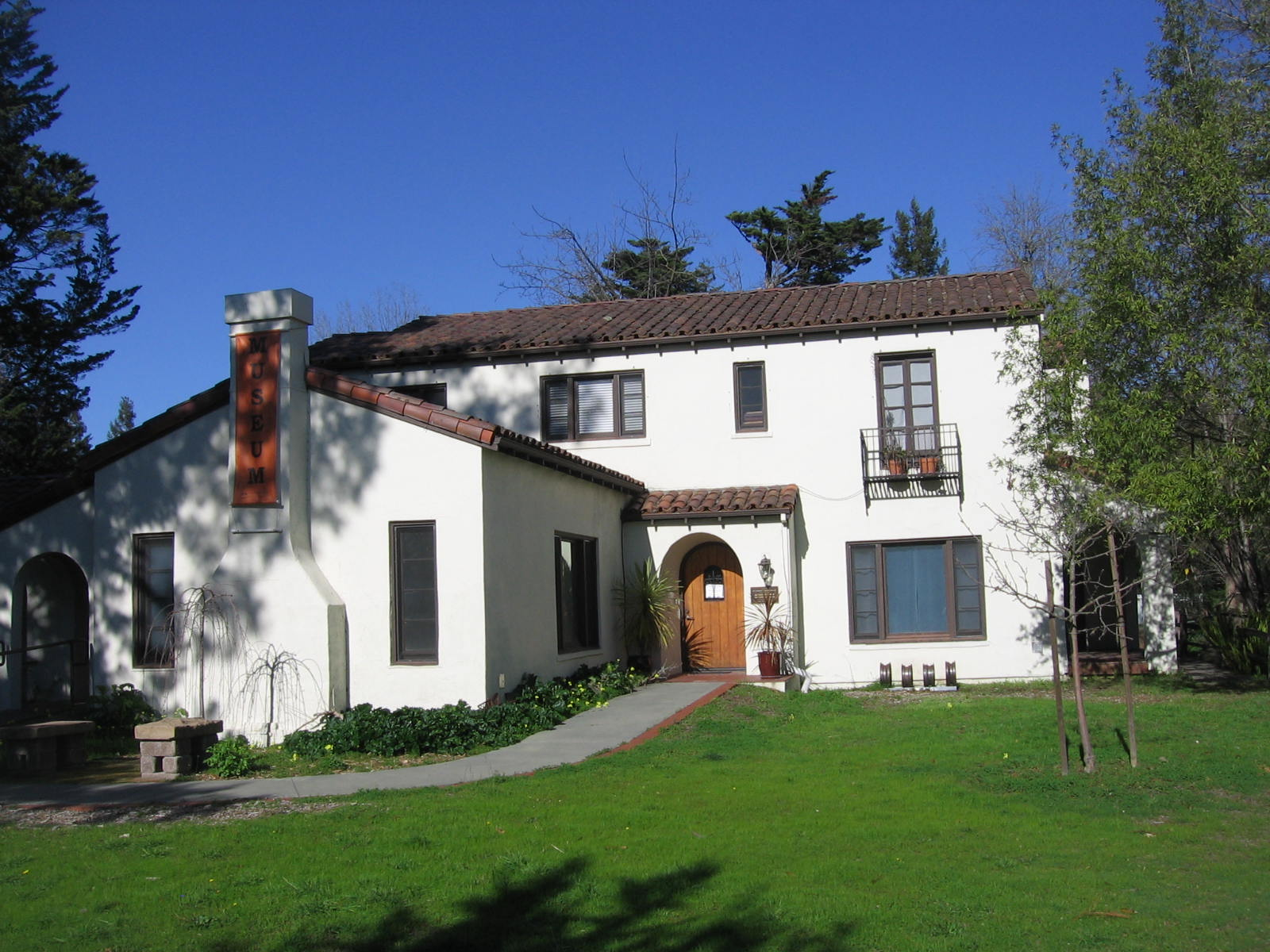
Hembree House
