= List of Sonoma County Regional Parks facilities =

Sonoma County, California, U.S.A. has numerous regional parks, beaches, trails, and other facilities that are maintained by the Sonoma County Regional Parks Department.

Sonoma County regional parks typically provide facilities for hiking, picnicking, horseback riding, and mountain biking. Some Parks Department facilities are trails for day-hiking or accessing beaches along the rugged Pacific coast. Certain facilities include swimming areas, skateparks, dog parks, basketball courts, sports fields, and playgrounds. Marinas and river parks typically offer fishing and boat ramps.

Name	Location	Area/Length	Coordinates
Andy's Unity Park	3399 Moorland Avenue, Santa Rosa, California	4.4 acres	
Bird Walk (Coastal Access Trail)	355 State Route 1, Bodega Bay, California	1.19 miles	38°19′13″N 123°2′6″W
Black Point (Coastal Access Trail)	35035 State Route 1, Sea Ranch, California	0.25 miles	38°43′0″N 123°27′28″W
Bluff Top (Coastal Access Trail)	40101 Highway 1, The Sea Ranch, California	3 miles	
Cloverdale River Park	31820 McCray Road, Cloverdale, California	73 acres (30 ha)	38°49′23″N 123°0′37″W
Coastal Prairie Trail	2255 Highway 1, Bodega Bay, California	1.1miles	
Colgan Creek Trail	3600 Stony Point Road, Santa Rosa, California	1.2 miles (1.9 km)	38°23′20″N 122°44′29″W
Crane Creek Regional Park	6107 Pressley Road, Rohnert Park, California	128 acres (52 ha)	38°20′39″N 122°38′39″W
Del Rio Woods	2668 S. Fitch Mountain Road, Healdsburg, California		
Doran Regional Park	201 Doran Beach Road, Bodega Bay, California	127 acres (51 ha)	38°18′50″N 123°2′5″W
Ernie Smith Community Park	18776 Gillman Drive, Sonoma, California		38°18′16″N 122°29′37″W
Foothill Regional Park	1351 Arata Lane, Windsor, California	211 acres (85 ha)	38°33′40″N 122°47′52″W
Forestville River Access	10584 River Drive, Forestville, California		38°30′35″N 122°55′25″W
Gualala Point Regional Park	42401 State Route 1, Sea Ranch, California	103 acres (42 ha)	38°45′32″N 123°31′22″W
Guerneville River Park	13811 State Route 116, Guerneville, California	5.3 acres (2 ha)	38°30′0″N 122°59′39″W
Healdsburg Veterans Memorial Beach	13839 Old Redwood Highway, Healdsburg, California		38°36′12″N 122°51′31″W
Helen Putnam Regional Park	411 Chileno Valley Road, Petaluma, California	216 acres (87 ha)	38°12′45″N 122°39′51″W
Hood Mountain Regional Park	3000 Los Alamos Road, Santa Rosa, California	1,978 acres (800 ha)	38°27′31″N 122°33′5″W
Hudeman Slough Boat Launch	28020 Skaggs Island Road, Sonoma, California		
Hunter Creek Trail	Santa Rosa Avenue, Santa Rosa, California	1.5 miles (2.4 km)	
Joe Rodota Trail	Santa Rosa to Forestville	13 miles (21 km)	
Kenwood Plaza Park	200 Warm Springs Road, Kenwood, California	5 acres	
Laguna de Santa Rosa Trail	6303 Highway 12, Santa Rosa, California	1.8 miles	
Larson Park	De Chene Avenue, Boyes Hot Springs, California		
Maddux Ranch Park	4655 Lavelle Road, Santa Rosa, California	11 acres	
Mark West Creek Park	3000 Porter Creek Road, Santa Rosa, California	1,192 acres	
Maxwell Farms Regional Park	100 Verano Avenue, Sonoma, California	85 acres (34 ha)	
Moran Goodman Park	980 Sonoma Glen Circle, Glen Ellen, California		
North Sonoma Mountain	5297 Sonoma Mountain Road, Sonoma County, California	820 acres (330 ha)	
Occidental Community Center	3920 Bohemian Highway, Occidental, California	3,700 square foot auditorium	
Pebble Beach (Coastal Access Trail)	36448 State Route 1, Sea Ranch, California	0.27 miles	
Pinnacle Gulch (Coastal Access Trail)	20600 Mockingbird Road, Bodega Bay, California	0.5 miles	
Porto Bodega Sport Fishing Center	1500 Bay Flat Road, Bodega Bay, California		
Ragle Ranch Regional Park	500 Ragle Road, Sebastopol, California	157 acres (64 ha)	
Riverfront Regional Park	7821 Eastside Road, Windsor, California	305 acres (123 ha)	
Running Fence	15000 Bodega Highway, Bodega, California	0.25 acres	
Santa Rosa Creek Trail	782 Willowside Road, Santa Rosa, California	2.14 miles	
Shaw Park	120 Shaw Avenue, Kenwood, California	5 acres	
Shell Beach (Coastal Access Trail)	39200 State Route 1, Sea Ranch, California	0.65 miles	
Shiloh Ranch Regional Park	5750 Faught Road, Santa Rosa, California	845 acres (342 ha)	
Shorttail Gulch (Coastal Access Trail)	20600 Mockingbird Road, Bodega Bay, California	0.5 miles	
Soda Springs Reserve	24700 Kelly Road, Annapolis, California	49 acres (20 ha)	
Sonoma Valley Regional Park	13630 Sonoma Highway, Glen Ellen, California	167 acres (68 ha)	
Spring Lake Regional Park	393 Violetti Road, Santa Rosa, California	330 acres (130 ha)	
Spud Point Marina	1818 Westshore Road, Bodega Bay, California		
Steelhead Beach Regional Park	9000 River Road, Forestville, California	26 acres (11 ha)	
Stengel Beach (Coastal Access Trail)	37900 State Route 1, Sea Ranch, California	0.12 miles	
Stillwater Cove Regional Park	22455 State Route 1, Jenner, California	363 acres (147 ha)	
Sunset Beach River Park	1403 River Road, Forestville, California	25 acres (10 ha)	
Taylor Mountain Regional Park	Kawana Terrace, Santa Rosa, California	1,100 acres (450 ha)	
Tolay Lake Regional Park	Cannon Lane, Petaluma, California	1,769 acres (716 ha)	
Tom Schopflin Fields	4351 Old Redwood Highway, Santa Rosa, California	21 acres	
Walk On Beach (Coastal Access Trail)	40101 State Route 1, Sea Ranch, California	0.25 miles	
Watson School	15000 Bodega Highway, Bodega, California	0.25 acres	
West County Trail	Santa Rosa to Forestville	13 miles (21 km)	
Westside Regional Park	2400 Westshore Road, Bodega Bay, California		
Wohler Bridge Fishing Access	9765 Wohler Road, Forestville, California		

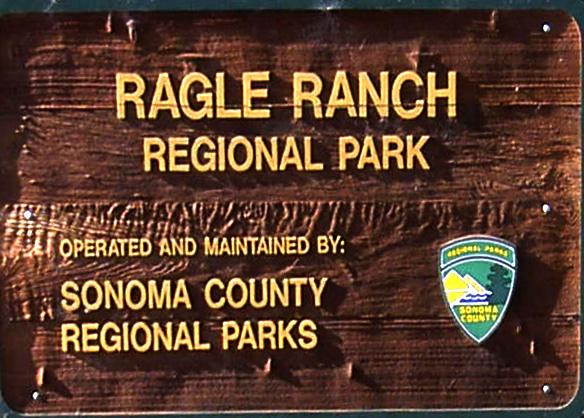

== See also ==
- List of beaches in Sonoma County, California
- Regional park
- Sonoma County Historic Landmarks and Districts
