= Doran Park =

Doran Park can refer to two places in the United States:

- Doran Park, a Cape Cod Baseball League park in Bourne, Massachusetts
- Doran Regional Park, a park in Bodega Bay, California
