= Gualala =

Gualala may refer to:

== In North America ==
- Gualala, California, an unincorporated community 105 miles north of San Francisco
- Gualala River, a 40-mile-long (64 km) river that has its mouth near Gualala, California
- Gualala Point Regional Park, a regional park at the mouth of the Gualala River

== In Central America ==
- Gualala, Honduras, a municipality
- Atlético Gualala, a football club
