= Pinnacle and Shorttail Gulch Coastal Access Trails =

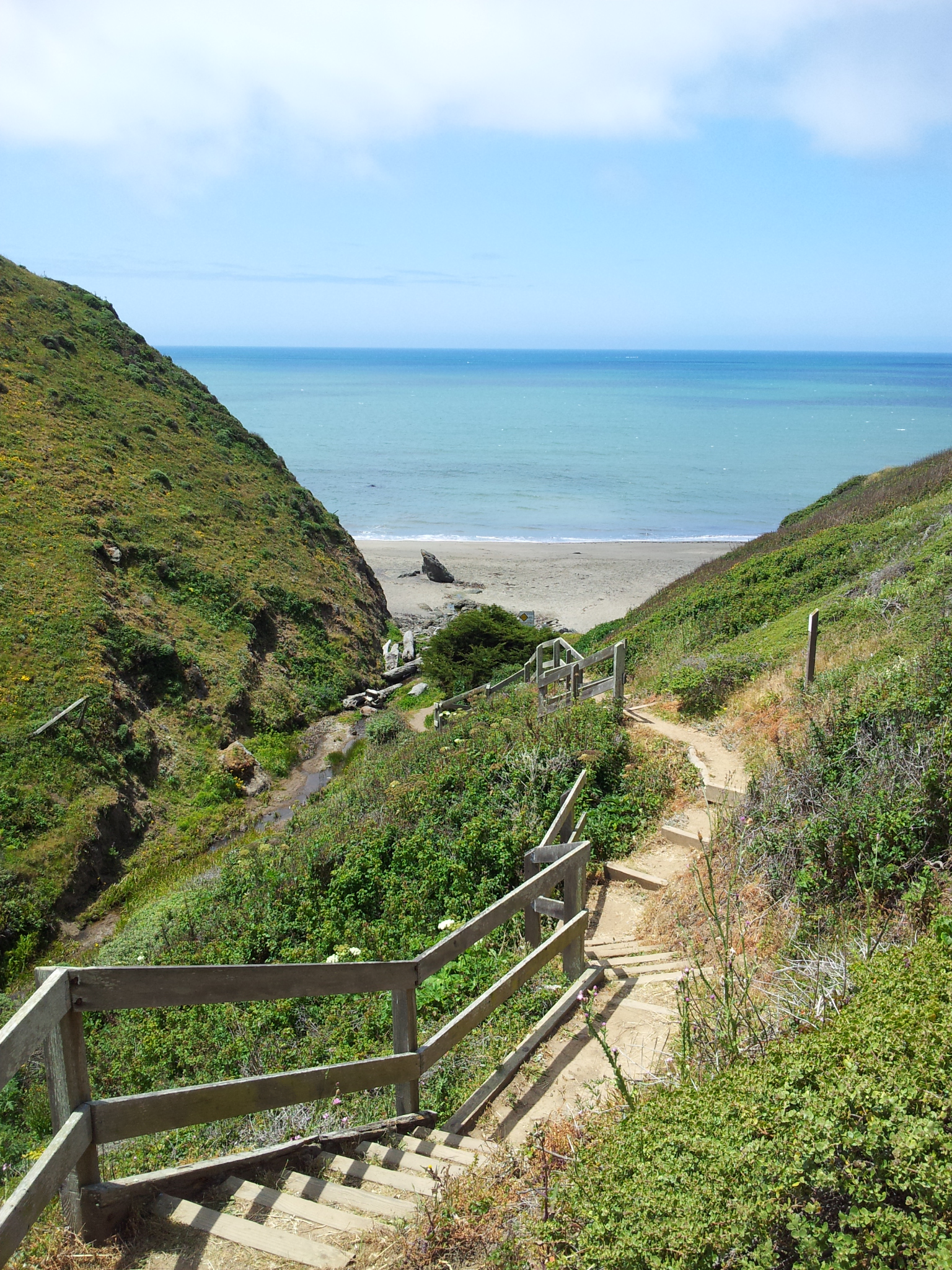
Shorttail Gulch Coastal Access Trail.

Pinnacle Gulch and Shorttail Gulch are coastal access trails served by the same Sonoma County Regional Parks Department parking lot. The trails provide beach and tidepool access to the Pacific Coast of northern California in the United States. The trails are located south of Bodega Bay in Sonoma County. Automobile access from California State Route 1 is via Harbor Way just south of downtown Bodega Bay, California. A fee or Sonoma County Regional Parks pass is required for use of the trail head parking lot and rest room.

The 0.55 miles (0.89 km) Pinnacle Gulch coastal access trail begins across Mockingbird Road from the parking lot at 20600 Mockingbird in the residential subdivision of Bodega Harbor. The 0.52 miles (0.84 km) Shorttail Gulch coastal access trail is reached by walking 0.42 miles (0.68 km) south from the parking lot along Mockingbird and Osprey roads. Both trails follow steep ravines eroded through Pleistocene marine and marine terrace deposits supporting northern coastal scrub including thick growth of poison oak. The beach is suitable for recreational fishing and swimming at your own risk. It may be possible to hike 0.4 miles (0.64 km) along the beach between the two trails at low tide.

== See also ==
- List of Sonoma County Regional Parks facilities
