= Estero Americano Coast Preserve =

Nature preserve in Sonoma County, California

- IUCN category V (protected landscape/seascape)
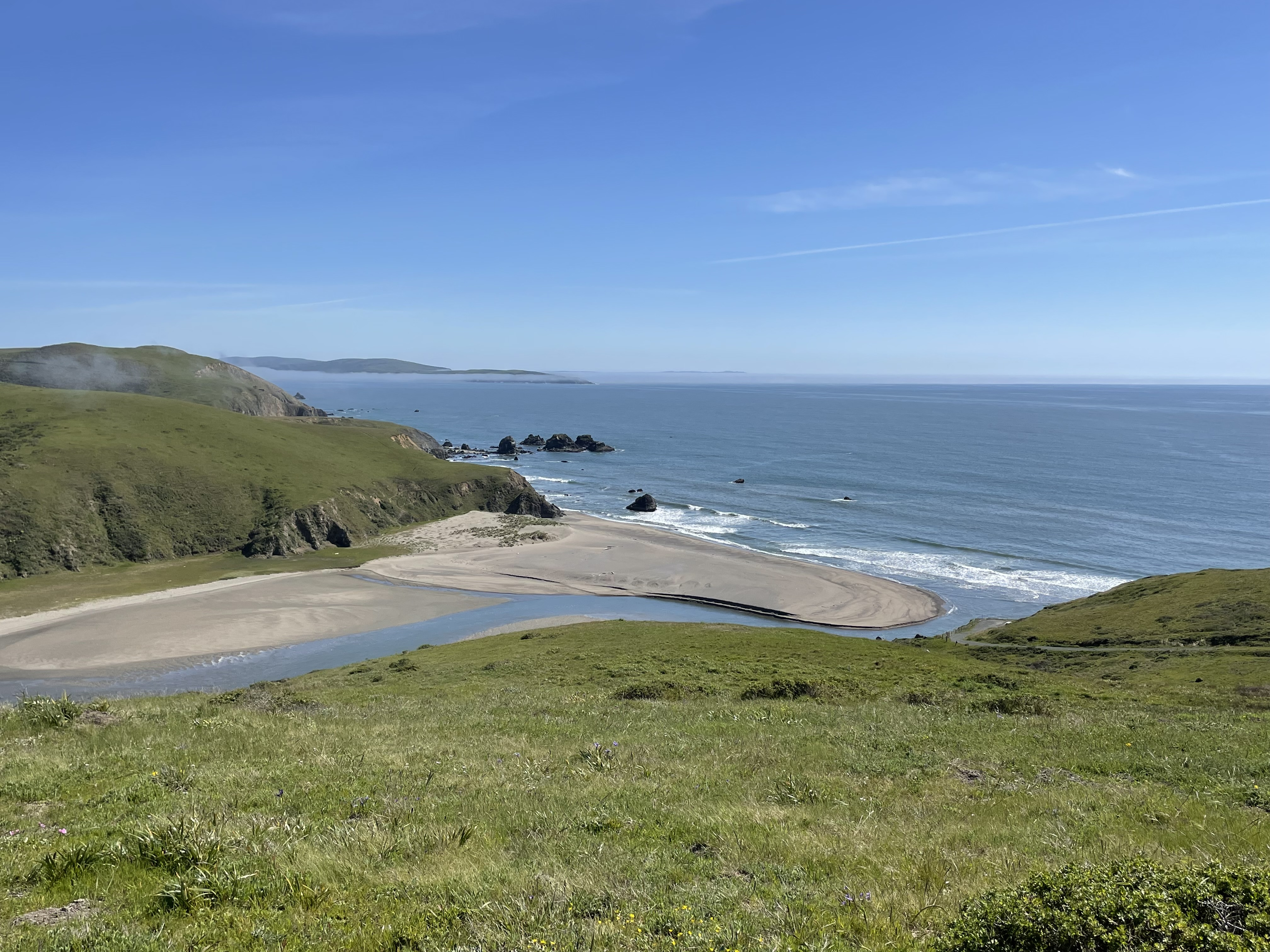
- Estero Americano mouth

- Location within California
- Interactive map of Estero Americano Coast Preserve
- Location: Sonoma County, California
- Nearest city: Bodega Bay, California
- Coordinates: 38.30399°N 123.00684°W
- Area: 547 acres (221 ha)
- Max. elevation: 600 ft (180 m)
- Min. elevation: 0 ft (0 m)
- Established: 2016
- Operator: The Wildlands Conservancy
- Website: Estero Americano Coast Preserve

Estero Americano Coast Preserve (Estero Americano, Spanish for "American Estuary") is a nature preserve on the Sonoma coast overlooking the Estero Americano estuary, the Pacific Ocean, Bodega Bay, Bodega Head, and Point Reyes. Its landscape is dominated by coastal prairie, with tidal marshes, eelgrass beds, and mudflats that support species such as Central California Coast steelhead, tidewater goby, and California red-legged frog. The 547 acres (221 ha) preserve is owned and managed by The Wildlands Conservancy as part of its system of preserves.

== Geography ==
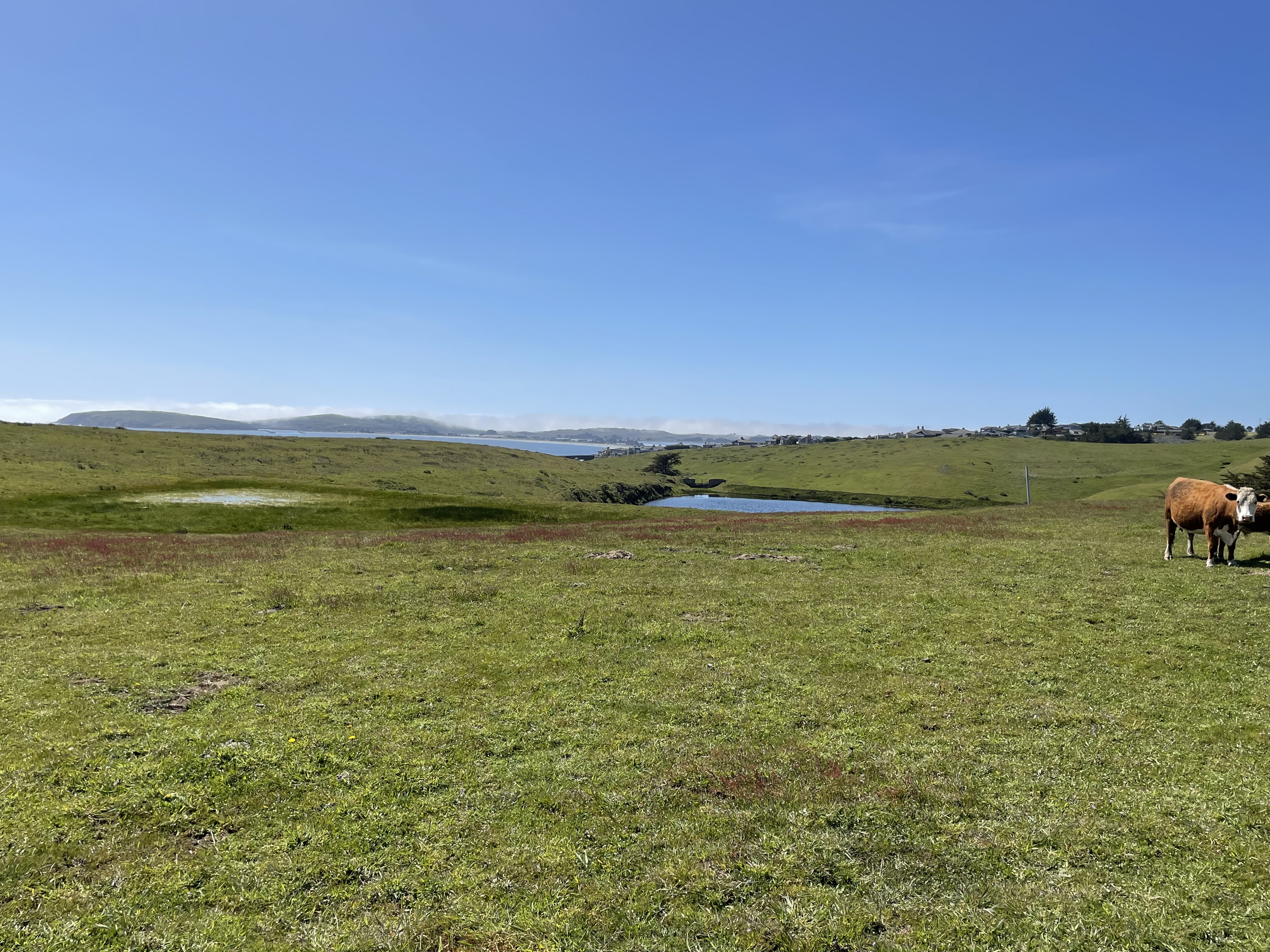
Bodega Bay and Head

The preserve includes coastal prairie, rolling grasslands, and blufftop terraces overlooking the Pacific Ocean. It protects habitat near the mouth of the Estero Americano estuary, an area characterized by seasonal wetlands, tidal marshes, and native plant communities. The estuary lies within the Greater Farallones National Marine Sanctuary, a federally protected marine region along the California coast.

== Flora and fauna ==
Habitats include tidal marshes, eelgrass beds, mudflats, and open waters that support federally listed species such as Central California Coast steelhead, tidewater goby, and California red-legged frog. The tidewater goby is considered an indicator species whose presence reflects the ecological health of the Estero Americano estuary. Coastal prairie vegetation includes native grasses and seasonal wildflowers. Resident wildlife includes badgers, bobcats, and deer, as well as birds of prey and waterfowl. The preserve lies along the Pacific Flyway, providing forage and rest for migratory birds.

== History ==
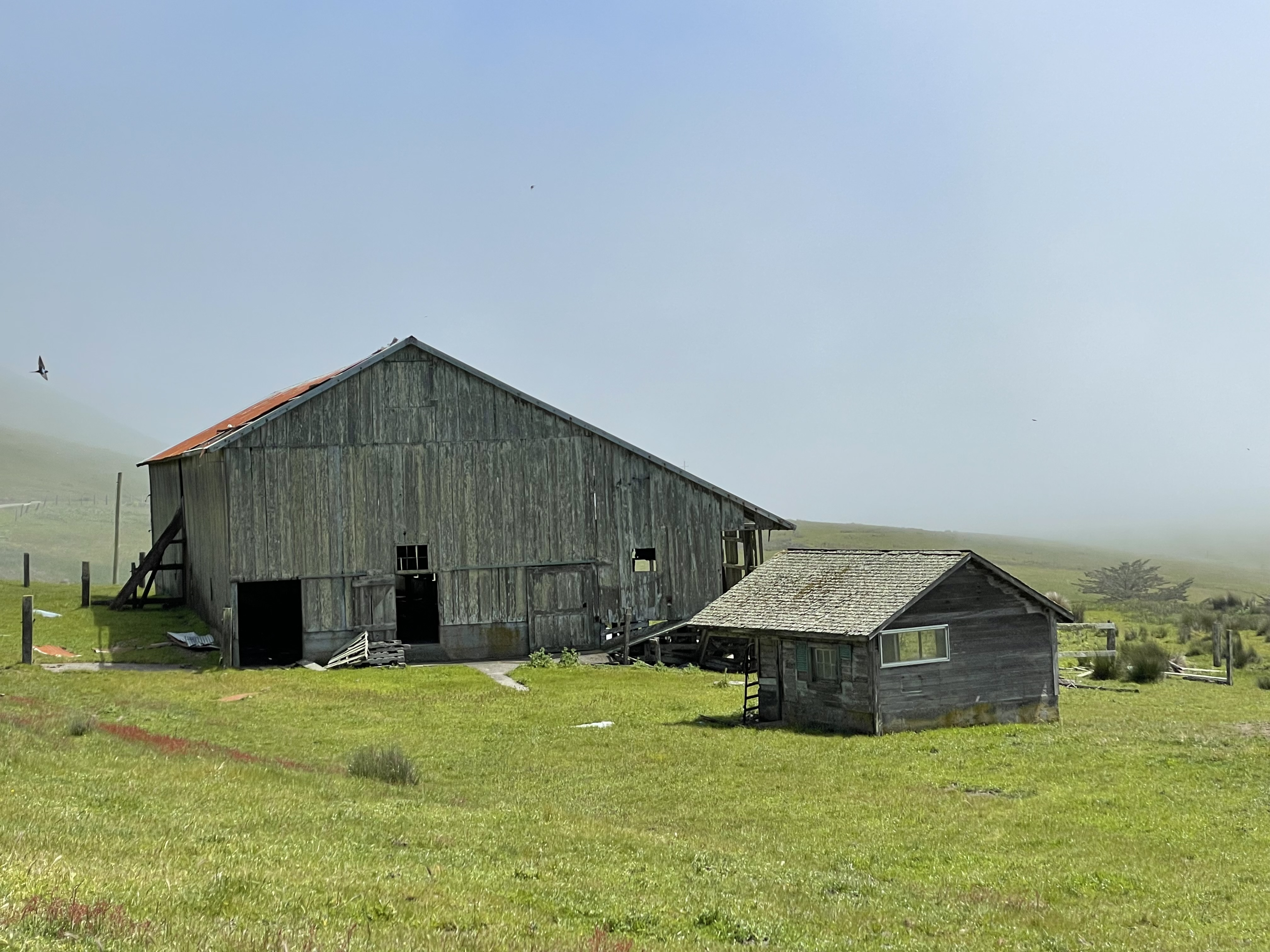
Former ranch buildings

The property, historically known as Bottarini Ranch or Estero Ranch, was purchased in 2015 by The Wildlands Conservancy for $3.8 million, with funding support from the California State Coastal Conservancy, the Gordon and Betty Moore Foundation, Sonoma County Agricultural Preservation and Open Space District, Sonoma Land Trust, and individual donors.

Public access was delayed while environmental surveys, permitting, and planning were completed. In November 2024, the California Coastal Commission approved a coastal development permit for a system of public trails and visitor facilities. The preserve opened to the public in 2025.

== Conservation ==
The preserve contributes to a wildlife corridor linking protected areas along the Sonoma and Marin coasts.

Under permit conditions, The Wildlands Conservancy is required to restore 3.6 acres (1.5 ha) of coastal prairie, remove invasive Spanish broom, and conduct native revegetation using local seed sources, with monitoring through 2028. Grazing is retained as a rangeland management tool.

In 2025, the preserve served as a mitigation site for a Highway 1 bridge replacement project, which included wetland creation and enhancement, riparian revegetation, grazing management, and long-term monitoring.

== Recreation ==
The preserve has about five miles of hiking trails, along with signage, picnic areas, a kayak pull-out, and restrooms. State funding for some public access improvements was provided in September 2025, when the California State Coastal Conservancy awarded The Wildlands Conservancy up to $240,200 for trail construction, signage, restroom facilities, kayak access, and renovation of a ranch house for caretaker housing.

The trail system provides public access to land that had previously been closed to the public, including the estuary shoreline, upland bluffs overlooking the Estero Americano, and the beach at the mouth of the estuary. Portions of the beach may be seasonally inaccessible during winter breaching events.

== See also ==
- List of The Wildlands Conservancy preserves
- Jenner Headlands Preserve
- Doran Regional Park
- Sonoma Coast State Park
- Estero Americano State Marine Recreational Management Area
