= California Bays and Estuaries Policy =

Guidelines to prevent water quality degradation

The Water Quality Control Policy for the Enclosed Bays and Estuaries of California is published by the California State Water Resources Control Board as guidelines to prevent water quality degradation. The policy is revised as needed.

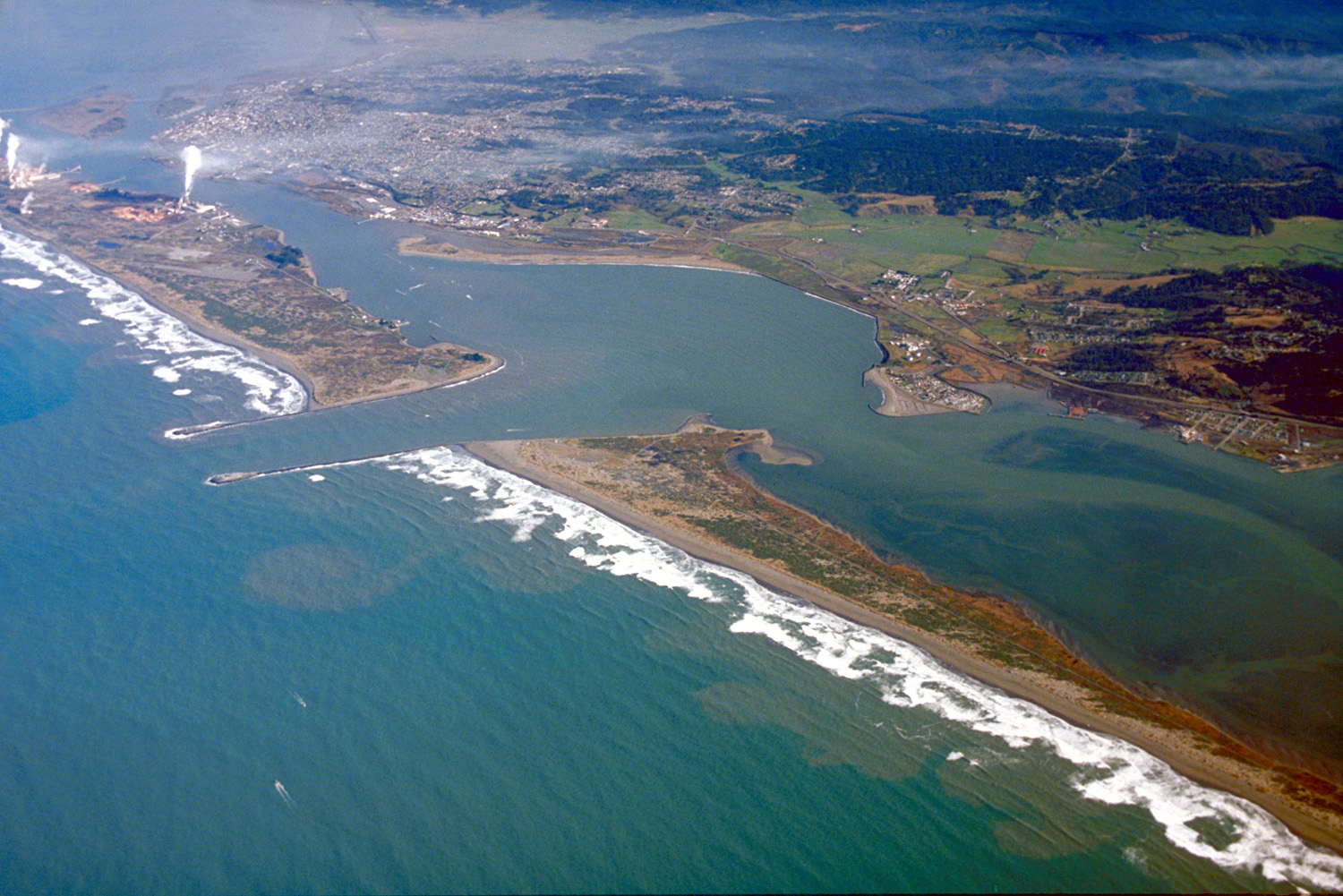
Although only a portion of Humboldt Bay is visible in this aerial image, the small opening to the Pacific Ocean illustrates the limited mixing opportunities for dilution of wastes entering the bay in runoff.

== Geography ==
The Pacific coast of California has few natural harbors in comparison to similar lengths of the Atlantic coast of the United States. Humboldt Bay, Bodega Harbor, Tomales Bay, Drakes Estero, San Francisco Bay, Morro Bay, Los Angeles - Long Beach Harbor, Upper Newport Bay, Newport Back Bay, Mission Bay, and San Diego Bay are identified by the policy. The policy also applies to smaller areas of ocean water within headlands or harbor works when the distance between those features is less than 75 percent of the greatest dimension of the enclosed portion.

Mixing zones for fresh and ocean waters at the mouths of the Smith River, Klamath River, Mad River, Eel River, Noyo River, Russian River, and Sacramento–San Joaquin River Delta are identified as estuaries. The policy also applies to coastal lagoons and mouths of streams temporarily separated from the ocean by sandbars.

The sheltering features making harbors favorable for ocean transportation cargo transfer limit mixing and dilution through surf action and ocean currents.

== History ==
Harbors were important foci of early European American settlement of California; and cities have developed adjacent to the larger ones. Unique aquatic ecosystems of limited geographical extent have been impacted by waste disposal practices. The Clean Water Act of 1972 established regulation for discharges of pollutants into water. Under the CWA, the Environmental Protection Agency (EPA) has developed water quality standards as well as regulation programs. Each state was able to set their own standards of water quality for each body of water, as well as establishing their own technology standards. The California Bays and Estuaries Policy served as part of the water quality standards in effect for the CWA.

== Policy ==
The Bays and Estuaries Policy adopted on 16 May 1974 concluded discharges of municipal wastewater and industrial process water should only be allowed when such discharges enhance the quality of the bay or estuary. The policy called for the entirety of closed bays and estuaries in California to extract toxic substances present in the waters, while coming up with unproblematic methods of discharging these wastes. Along with being compliant with the limitations this policy had set up, it also sets the expectation for further compliance with existing acts, such as components of the Porter-Cologne Water Quality Act and the "Water Quality Control Plan for Control of Temperature in the Coastal and Interstate Waters and Enclosed Bays and Estuaries of California of 1972. Exceptions for waste disposal were made for San Francisco Bay and for cooling water discharges at other locations. The policy was revised 16 November 1995. Revisions were to amend Section 1b of the policy. It allowed specific exceptions to the original prohibition of wastewater discharges to the San Francisco Bay, south of Dumbarton Bridge under the premise that a series of qualifying findings were met.

== Present ==
As of recently, the United States has taken a leap to restore estuary habitats in 2000 with the Estuary Restoration Act (ERA). The ERA aims to promote restoration through leveraging public-private relationships while also monitoring economic impacts of restoration.
