= Steelhead Beach Regional Park =

Regional park in California, US

- Interactive map of Steelhead Beach Regional Park
- Type: Regional park
- Location: 9000 River Road; Forestville, California, United States
- Nearest city: Forestville, California
- Coordinates: 38.5°N 122.9°W
- Area: 26 acres (11 ha)
- Operator: Sonoma County Regional Parks Department
- Open: Seasonal; Day use only
- Status: Open

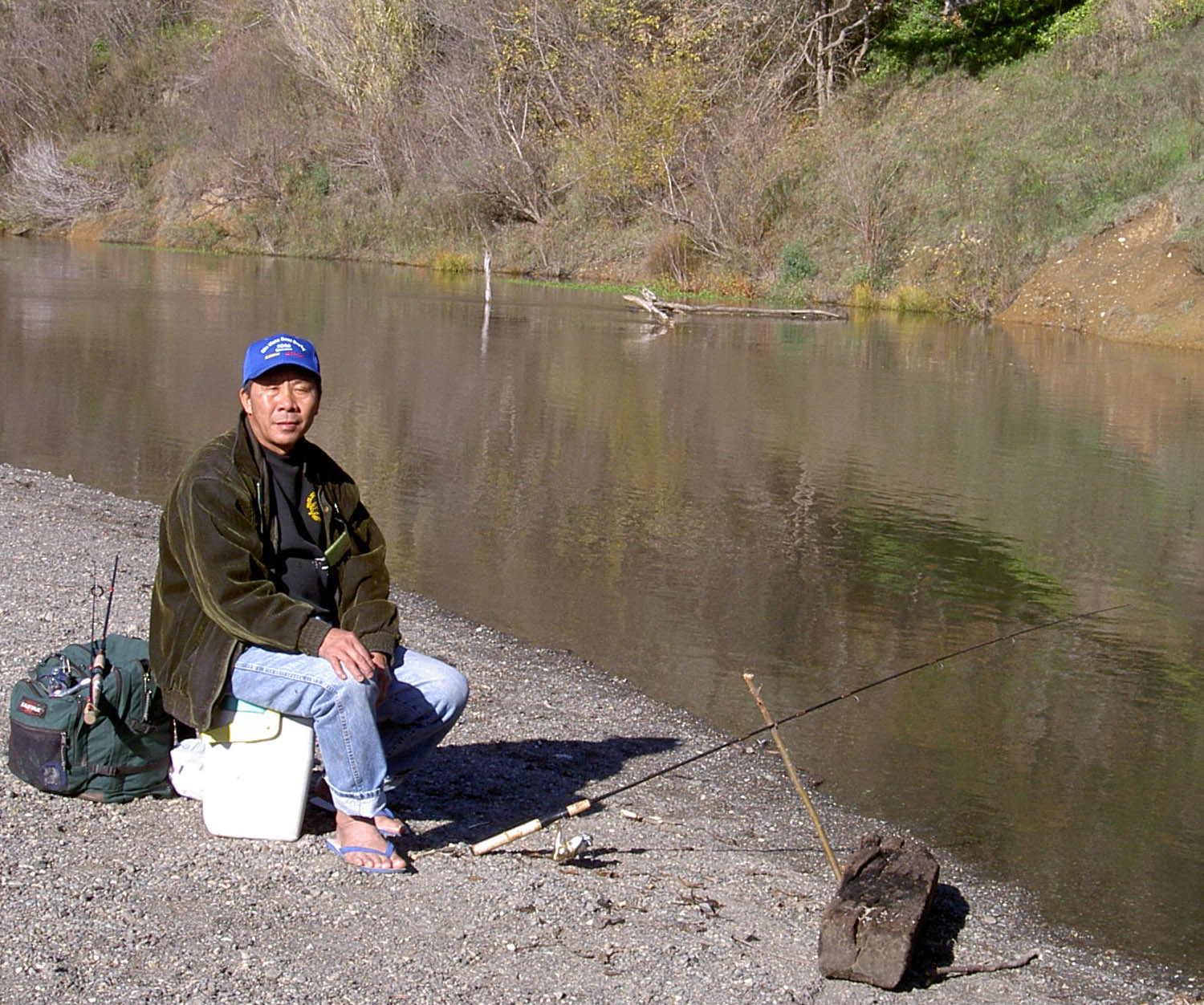
Angler on the beach, December 2007.

Steelhead Beach Regional Park is a regional park on the Russian River north of Forestville, California, U.S.A. that is maintained by the Sonoma County Regional Parks Department. The day use fee is $7 per vehicle.

== Features ==
The park features a river beach suitable for fishing, a small craft launching area, picnic areas, and restrooms. Steelhead Beach is a launch point for summer tubing trips on the river. Canoes, kayaks and paddle boards can be launched from the beach all year. There are several short trails that make a nearly 1-mile loop through woods along the riverbank. The woods have cottonwoods, big leaf maple, Oregon ash, and several other riparian tree species. No lifeguards are on duty here.

== See also ==
- List of Sonoma County Regional Parks facilities
