= Estero Americano State Marine Recreational Management Area =

Marine protected areas in California, US

Coordinates: 38.2969°N 123.0012°W

Estero Americano State Marine Recreational Management Area (SMRMA) is a marine protected area in the United States that splits Sonoma and Marin counties on California’s north central coast. The marine protected area covers 0.15 square miles. Estero Americano SMRMA prohibits the take of all living marine resources, except the recreational hunting of waterfowl, unless otherwise restricted by hunting regulations.

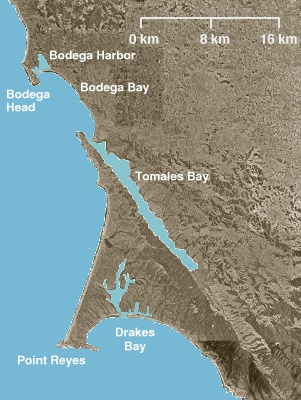

== History ==
Estero Americano SMRMA is one of 22 marine protected areas adopted by the California Department of Fish and Game in August 2009, during the second phase of the Marine Life Protection Act Initiative. The MLPAI is a collaborative public process to create a statewide network of protected areas along California’s coastline.

The north central coast’s new marine protected areas were designed by local divers, fishermen, conservationists and scientists who comprised the North Central Coast Regional Stakeholder Group. Their job was to design a network of protected areas that would preserve sensitive sea life and habitats while enhancing recreation, study and education opportunities.

The north central coast marine protected areas took effect on May 1, 2010.

== Geography and natural features ==
Estero Americano SMRMA is a marine protected area that splits Sonoma and Marin counties on California’s north central coast. Just west of State Highway 1, it meanders past the town of Valley Ford, California and empties into Bodega Bay about four miles southeast of the town of Bodega Bay

Estero Americano SMRMA area includes the waters below the mean high tide line within Estero Americano westward of longitude 122° 59.25' W.

== Habitat and wildlife ==
Much of the Estero Americano is designated as an “impaired” streamway, as defined in section 303(d) of the Federal Water Resource Statutes, due to runoff from pasture land and feedlots. Tidewater goby, ghost shrimp and mud shrimp, as well as significant seabird aggregations and other species depend upon this habitat. In some years, a sand bar forms at the mouth of the Estero, restricting tidal exchange, while at other times, tidal influences extend up to four miles from the mouth.

== Recreation and nearby attractions ==
Hiking trails at the adjacent Estero Americano Coast Preserve provide views of the estuary and coastal landscape.

Doran Regional Park, one mile south of Bodega Bay, provides a boat launch and campgrounds, while Salmon Creek Beach to the north is the most popular surf spot in Sonoma County.

Estero Americano SMRMA prohibits the take of all living marine resources, except the recreational hunting of waterfowl, unless otherwise restricted by hunting regulations. However, California's marine protected areas encourage recreational and educational uses of the ocean. Activities such as kayaking, diving, snorkeling, and swimming are allowed unless otherwise restricted.

== Scientific monitoring ==
As specified by the Marine Life Protection Act, select marine protected areas along California's central coast are being monitored by scientists to track their effectiveness and learn more about ocean health. Similar studies in marine protected areas located off of the Santa Barbara Channel Islands have already detected gradual improvements in fish size and number.

== See also ==
- Americano Creek
- Estero Americano Coast Preserve
