= Newport Back Bay =

Inland delta in Newport Beach, California

The Back Bay is the colloquial term for the inland delta in Newport Beach, California. It connects the Upper Newport Bay with the Newport Harbor. It is a nature reserve home to several species of birds with hiking and biking trails. The bay is recognized for protection by the California Bays and Estuaries Policy.

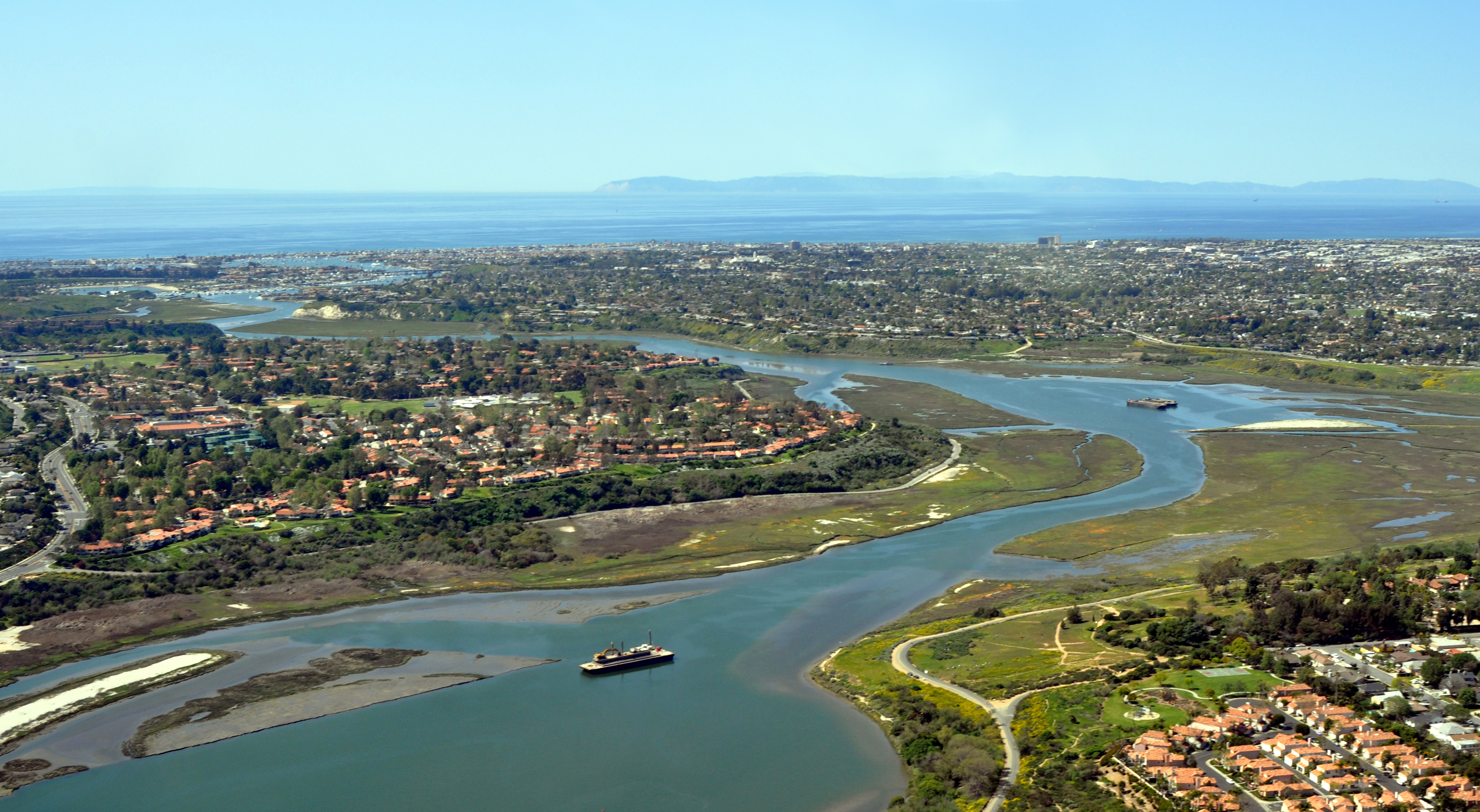
Newport Beach Back Bay from the air. Santa Catalina Island is visible on the horizon.

It is a heavily residential area being in the wealthiest portion of both Orange County, California as well as the city of Newport Beach.

== History ==
Sculpted by the Santa Ana River and carved during the Pleistocene Epoch, mammoth, bison, and giant sloth fossils have been discovered in sedimentary deposits of an older marine terrace. Until 1862, the Newport Bay flowed directly into the Pacific Ocean. The earliest human inhabitants lived in the bay some 9,000 years ago. The Bay was home to the Tongva and Acjachemen for thousands of years, who lived in nearby villages and mainly lived off fish, shellfish, and plants inhabiting the area. In the California mission period. The multiethnic village of Genga held influence over the Bay area prior to the arrival of Europeans in the area. In the California mission period, these villages declined from displacement and the area above the bay was used for grazing by cattle and sheep by the missionaries.

In 1870, the steamwheel steamer "Vaquero" gave Newport its namesake after delivering loads of lumber in a "new port." Acquired by the Irvine Company in 1864, the bay was used as a salt works from the 1930s up until 1969, when the land used for the salt works was destroyed by flooding. It was not until the 1960s that preservation of the Newport Back Bay began. The area included a section that began near where the Back Bay Science Center is currently located, where small boats were allowed to speed up to 35 miles per hour in a circular course of approximately 1/4 mile in length. After another 1/4 mile further, past Big Canyon, water skiing was permitted in a circular course; due to ten years of constant lawsuits, enacted by concerned citizens, the State of California Department of Fish and Game designated the undeveloped portions of the Upper Newport Bay as an ecological reserve. In the mid-1980s, Orange County incorporated the bluffs surrounding the bay to the ecological reserve. In 1989, Orange County accepted the 140-acre Upper Newport Bay Nature Preserve.

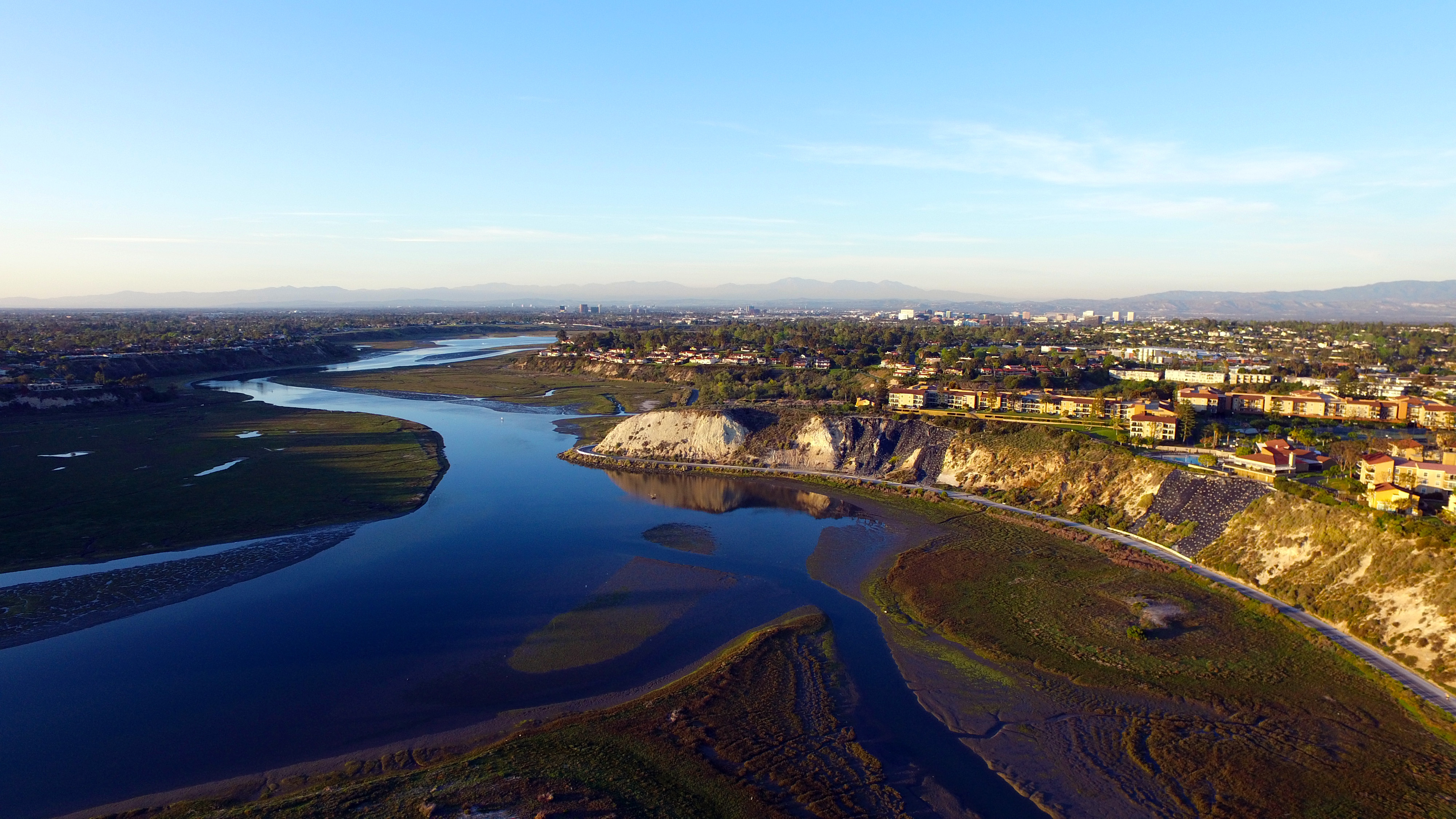
Aerial view of The Back Bay of Newport Beach

== Recreation ==
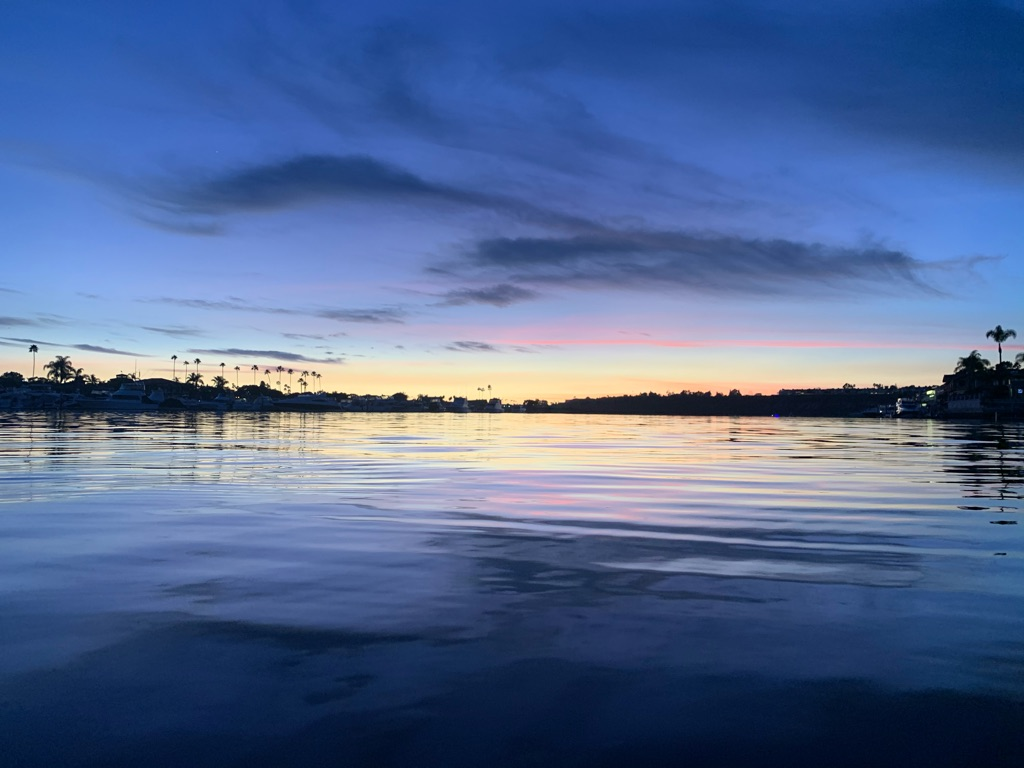
Newport Back Bay at sunset from a kayak

Activities that are open to the public include kayaking, canoeing, picnicking, horseback riding, biking, hiking and bird watching. The trails tend to be crowded with people on the weekends. Newport Back Bay is open from 7:00 a.m. to sunset, and the Ecological Information center is open 7:00 am to 4:00 pm every day of the week except Monday.

== Wildlife ==
The Back Bay has a wide range of plants, birds, mammals, amphibians, reptiles, insects, and marine life. Many of the animals that inhabit the Back Bay are listed on the state and federal endangered species list.

== Mammals ==
The mammals found in Newport Back Bay include rodents, bobcats, coyotes, and raccoons.

== Marine life ==
The Upper Newport Back Bay boasts one of the few remaining natural estuaries in Southern California. Living in the waters of the Upper Newport Back Bay, are several diverse species of plankton and algae. These plankton and algae act as a food source for the eighty or so species of fish that live in the estuary. The topsmelt, anchovy, and mullet are especially common in the area, feeding on the abundant population of plankton and detritus. Along with a multitude of fish, plankton, and algae, a number of invertebrates occupy the marine zone of the Upper Newport Back Bay. The most common invertebrates that can be found in the Upper Newport Back Bay are worms, molluscs, and crustaceans. Molluscs found in the bay are likely to harbor hurtful micro-organisms and bacteria, therefore human consumption of mussels, clams, and snails found in the bay is forbidden. Some of the molluscs that can be found in the Upper Newport Back Bay are California jackknife clam, the bent-nosed clam, the ribbed horse mussel, lined shore crabs, fiddler crabs, mud crabs, swimming crabs, skeleton shrimp, ghost shrimp, and the California horn snail.

== Plants ==
An abundance of plants have taken root in Newport Bay. Each of the plants has adapted to the saltwater-marsh habitat, known as a saltmarsh. These plants are known as halophytes, and have adapted to grow submerged in saltwater. Common halophytes found in the Back Bay include: saltmarsh bird's beak (Cordylanthus maritimus), fleshy jaumea, sea lavender, brewer's salt brush, sea blite, and alkali heath. There are also coastal plant communities scattered throughout the land surrounding the Back Bay. This includes grassland and coastal sage scrub. Native sage scrub varieties include California sagebrush and buckwheat. However, recently the Back Bay has been known to be home to various invasive plant species. These non-native species include wild mustards and pampas grass.

== Birds ==
Newport Bay is one of the top birding sites in the United States, as there are over 200 bird species that have made their homes here. Visiting the Back Bay will showcase the immense diversity of the bird inhabitants. The Back Bay is a vital area in the migration process; it serves as a sort of rest stop for birds migrating from Alaska or Canada. Some examples of birds that can be seen in the Back Bay are the light-footed clapper rail (Rallus longirostris levipes), the California least tern (Sterna antillarum browni), the Belding's Savannah sparrow (Passerculus sandwichensis beldingi), and the least Bell's vireo (Vireo bellii pusillus). All of these birds are considered endangered, on both the federal and the state levels. The bluffs surrounding the bay are also home to three sensitive species, the California gnatcatcher, the San Diego cactus wren, and the burrowing owl.

== Watershed ==
Newport Bay's watershed encompasses 154 square miles of the Orange County area. This watershed is divided into two key sub-watersheds, the San Diego Creek and the Dehli Canal. The San Diego Canal services the younger cities, while the Dehli canal services older cities, such as Santa Ana. This watershed is not connected to the Santa Ana River Watershed, as it is hydraulically distinct; although these two watersheds share an aquifer in northern Orange County. The Orange County Water District (OCWD) manages extraction and replenishment of the aquifer. Because the Newport Back Bay watershed is such a dry area, the water demand is high and supply upkeep is of utmost importance. To decrease the reliance on the Colorado River and Sacramento Delta, steps are being taken to educate people on how to conserve water. This educational process is fronted by the Newport Back Bay Science Center.

== Upper Newport Bay ==
The Upper Newport Bay is one of the last remaining natural estuaries in Southern California; that is, it is a very lush area of land that is home to fish, birds, and other animals. This land is important to migrating birds; it is used as just rest stop or a permanent winter dwelling for birds coming from Alaska or Canada and the spring it is a habitat for birds from the south. The upper bay serves as a barrier for industry of the lower bay and beaches in Newport. The beaches serve as playing group for families and the harbor serves as a docking site for boats.

== Newport Back Bay Science Center ==
The Newport Back Bay Science Center is located in Newport Beach, California on Shellmaker Island. This center's main focus is to supply information on estuarine and marine biology through activities and lectures in a year-round program. This science center is connected to the watershed, which is home to around 175 thousand people in urban cities. The Newport Back Bay Science Center's goal is to educate the citizens on how they can aid in keeping the Back Bay area clean, and how they affect the watershed.

== Back Bay Loop Trail ==
The Back Bay Loop Trail is a popular 10.5 mile trail that winds around Upper Newport Bay as well as the Back Bay. The trail stops at scenic locations, such as Upper Castaways Park, the County of Orange's Peter and Mary Muth Interpretive Center, the Back Bay Science Center (see section below), and Big Canyon. The loop runs through many different types of terrain, but is open to people of every ability. It is a common place to walk, jog, bike, or even cruise around in the car. The majority of the loop is paved, although there is a small section of earth that many joggers and hikers choose to walk upon. There are many stops along the loop, where visitors can look out at the bay, and even learn some interesting history about the various species they may see. Many entrance (as well as exit) points exist.

== Conservation ==
The Upper Newport Bay Ecological Reserve, which spans 752 acres, is one of the largest natural estuaries remaining in California. According to Brian Shelton, of the California Department of Fish and Game, less than five percent of California's original coastal estuaries exist today.

== Education ==
Educating the youth is one of the most important ways to the preservation of nature, and here at Newport Back Bay, there are many organizations and groups that seek to educate members of our society about the importance of nature preserves. Newport Bay Conservancy, in cooperation with OC Parks, California Department of Fish and Game, the City of Newport Beach, the Newport Aquatic Center, the California Coastal Commission, along with several other organizations, aims to reach out to the public regarding their goal. Their goal is “to increase environmental awareness and promote environmental stewardship at the Bay, in the watershed and beyond so as to protect and preserve not just Upper Newport Bay, but the planet.”

== Controversy ==
The California Department of Fish and Wildlife has posted signs telling users of the Upper Newport Bay Ecological Reserve that they may be subject to a fee. The signs indicate that users must have a Lands Pass — which costs $4.32 for a day at the reserve or $22.68 for the year and is required for people who want to hike, bike, bird watch or do anything but hunt in any of seven Fish and Wildlife-managed areas, including the Upper Newport Bay Ecological Reserve. The requirements have been in effect for several years yet the fee is not enforced. The Newport Beach City Council has submitted a letter to the department asking that the reserve be free.
