= Bodega Harbor =

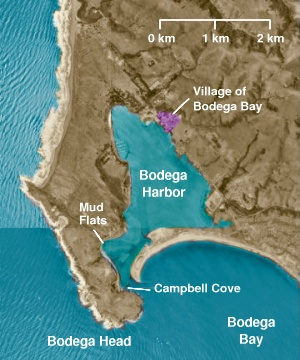
- Bodega Harbor
- Interactive map of Bodega Harbor
- 38°19′25″N 123°02′52″W
- Location: Bodega Bay, Sonoma County

California Historical Landmark
- Official name: Bodega Bay and Harbor
- Designated: November 3, 1969
- Reference no.: 833

Bodega Harbor is a small, shallow, natural harbor in Sonoma County on the Pacific Coast of northern California in the United States, approximately 40 mi (64 km) northwest of San Francisco. The harbor is approximately 2 sq mi (5.2 km^{2}) in area.

The harbor on the eastern side of Bodega Head and is protected from the main part of Bodega Bay to the south by a narrow sandy spit of land. The village of Bodega Bay sits along the eastern side of the harbor. Geologically, the harbor is formed by a depression of the San Andreas Fault.

Southwest of Bodega Harbor is the University of California's Bodega Marine Reserve on Horseshoe Cove. Bodega Harbor is a good location for access to Cordell Bank, Tomales Bay, and the Farallon Islands. The University of California maintains a marine biology study in the mud flats, along the southwestern corner of the harbor. Bodega Harbor is recognized for protection by the California Bays and Estuaries Policy.

== History ==
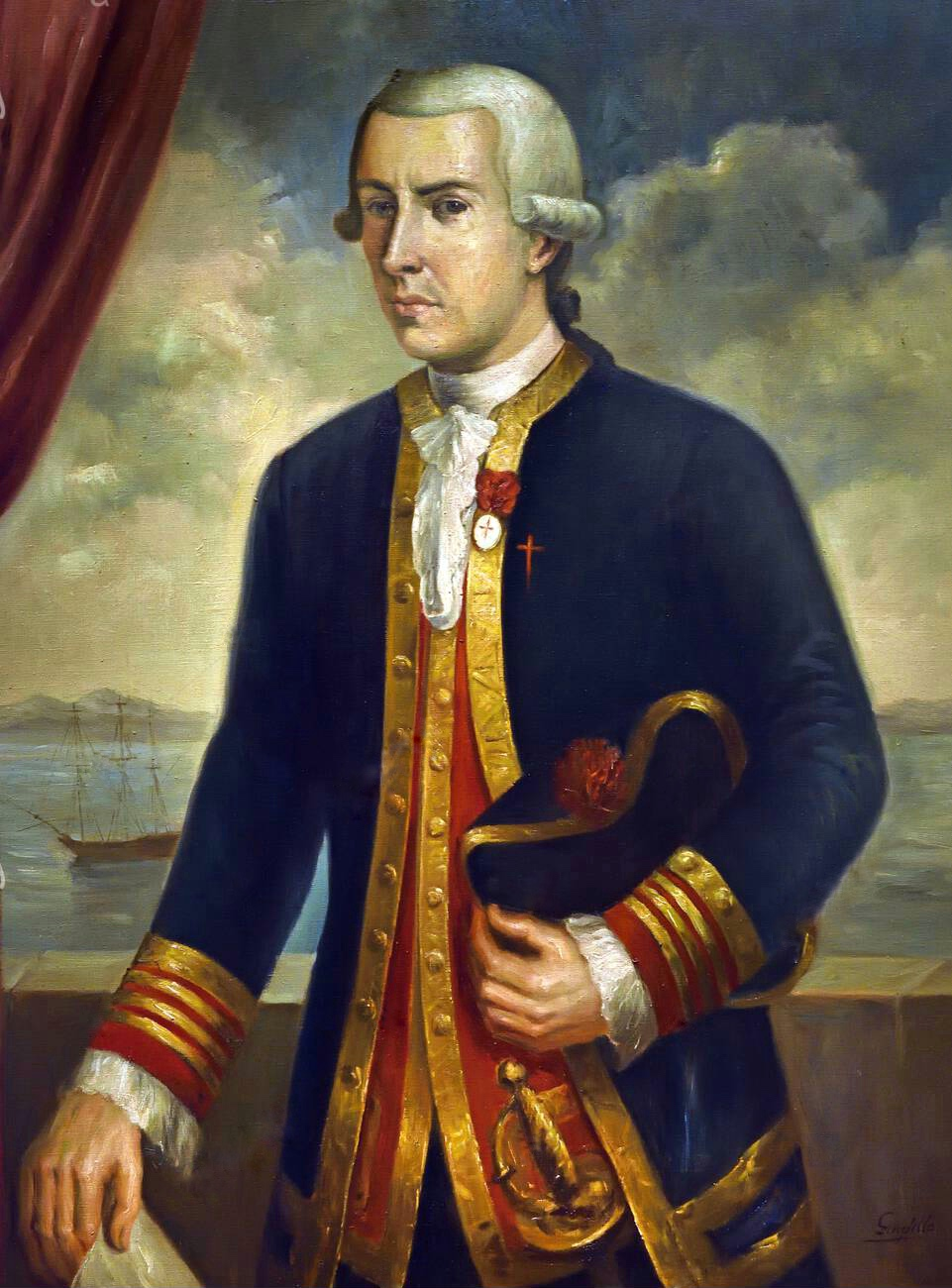
Bodega Harbor is named after Juan Francisco de la Bodega y Quadra, who explored Bodega Bay in 1775.

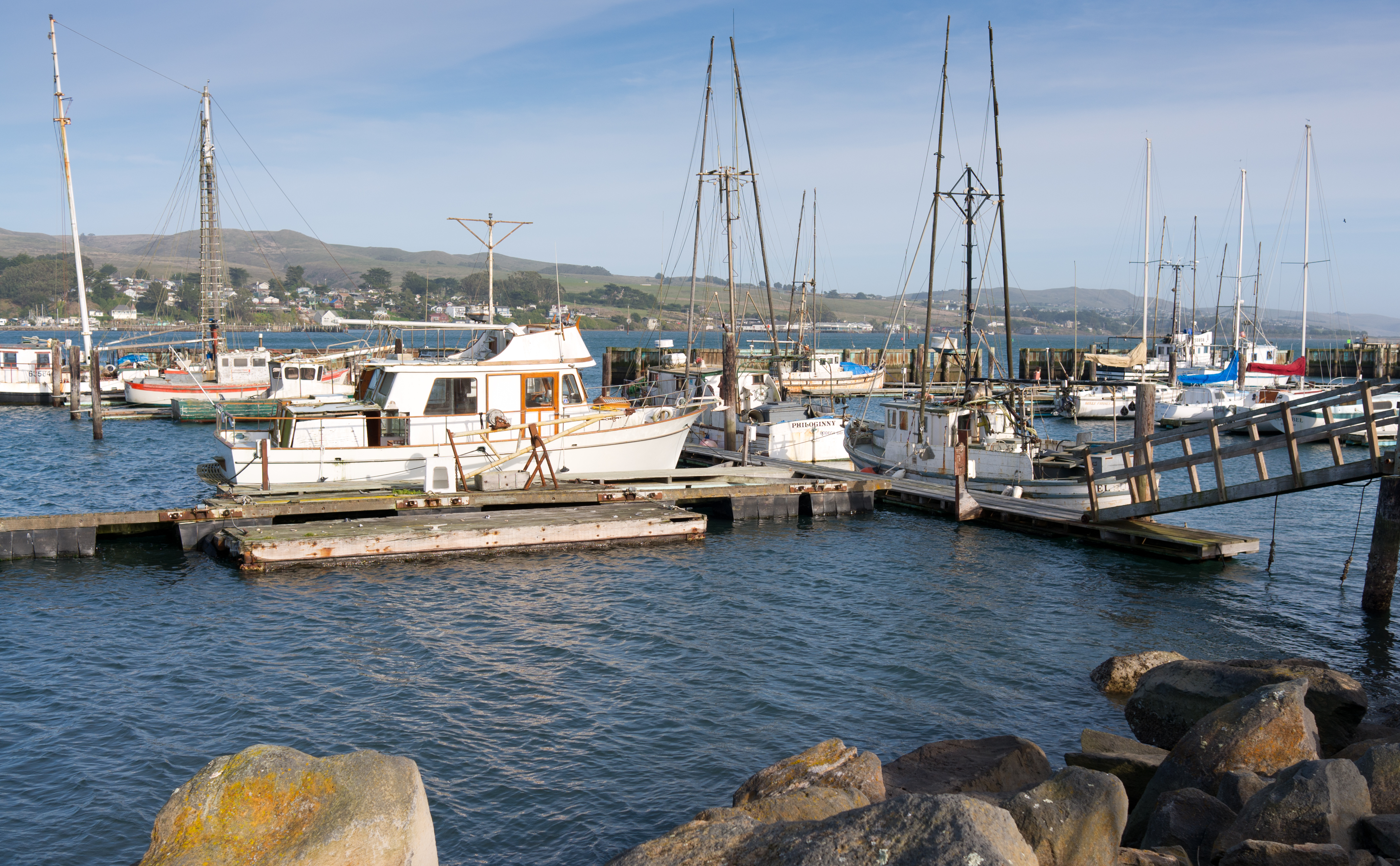
Fisherboats at Bodega Harbor

Campbell Cove near the entrance of the harbor from Bodega Bay is sometimes mentioned as a possible landing site of Francis Drake on the coast of North America in 1579. The site is not, however, considered to be a likely candidate by most historians. See: Drakes Estero, Bolinas Lagoon

The harbor was used from 1811 to the 1840s by the Russian-American Company colony at Fort Ross.

The harbor and the town were the primary location used by Alfred Hitchcock for his 1962 movie The Birds. Several scenes were shot using watercraft on the harbor.

The coastal freighter Marin was built at Antioch, California in 1928. When no longer useful for coastal trade, Marin was anchored in Bodega Harbor as a floating warehouse for local fishermen until a storm blew her ashore on the northern end of the harbor. A plan by Pacific Gas & Electric to build a nuclear power plant on Bodega Head included building a road to the proposed construction site, and that road passed seaward of the grounded freighter. The power plant project was abandoned in 1964 but the road remained and Marin gradually collapsed into the surrounding trees.

== Description ==
The natural harbor hosts two marinas, a boat launch, two fishing ports, campground and several waterfront restaurants. However, the primary recreational use is windsurfing and kitesurfing. The inner harbor is shallow, from no water at low tide to 6 ft (1.8 m) at high tide, and provides an ideal place to learn and improve.

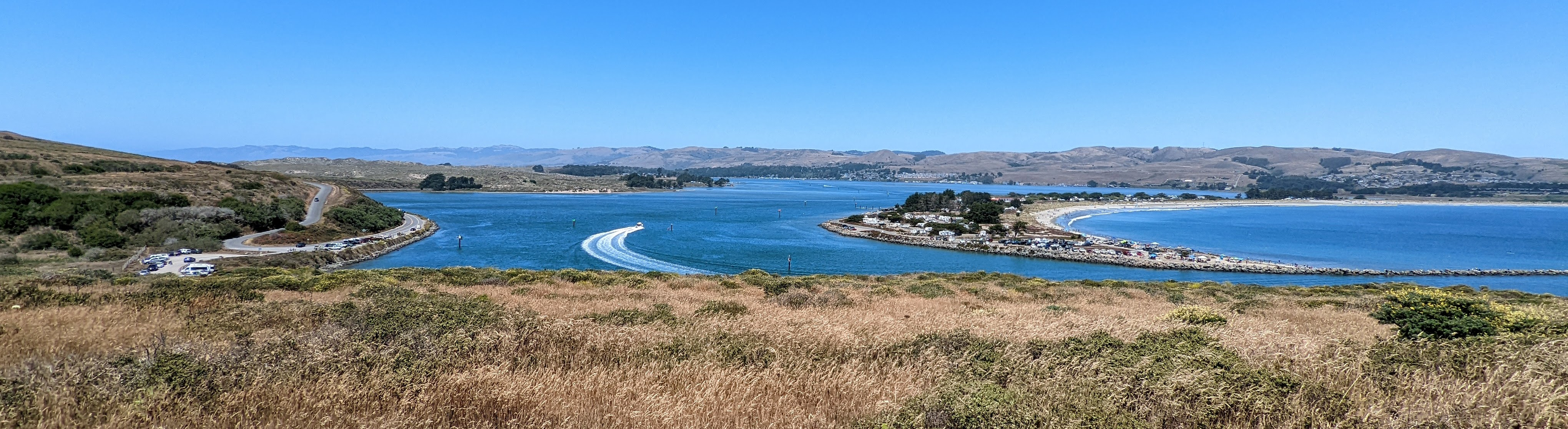
Panoramic view of Bodega Harbor from Bodega Head; Bodega Bay and Doran Beach at the right, behind the north jetty.
