= Stillwater Cove Regional Park =

Regional park in Jenner, California

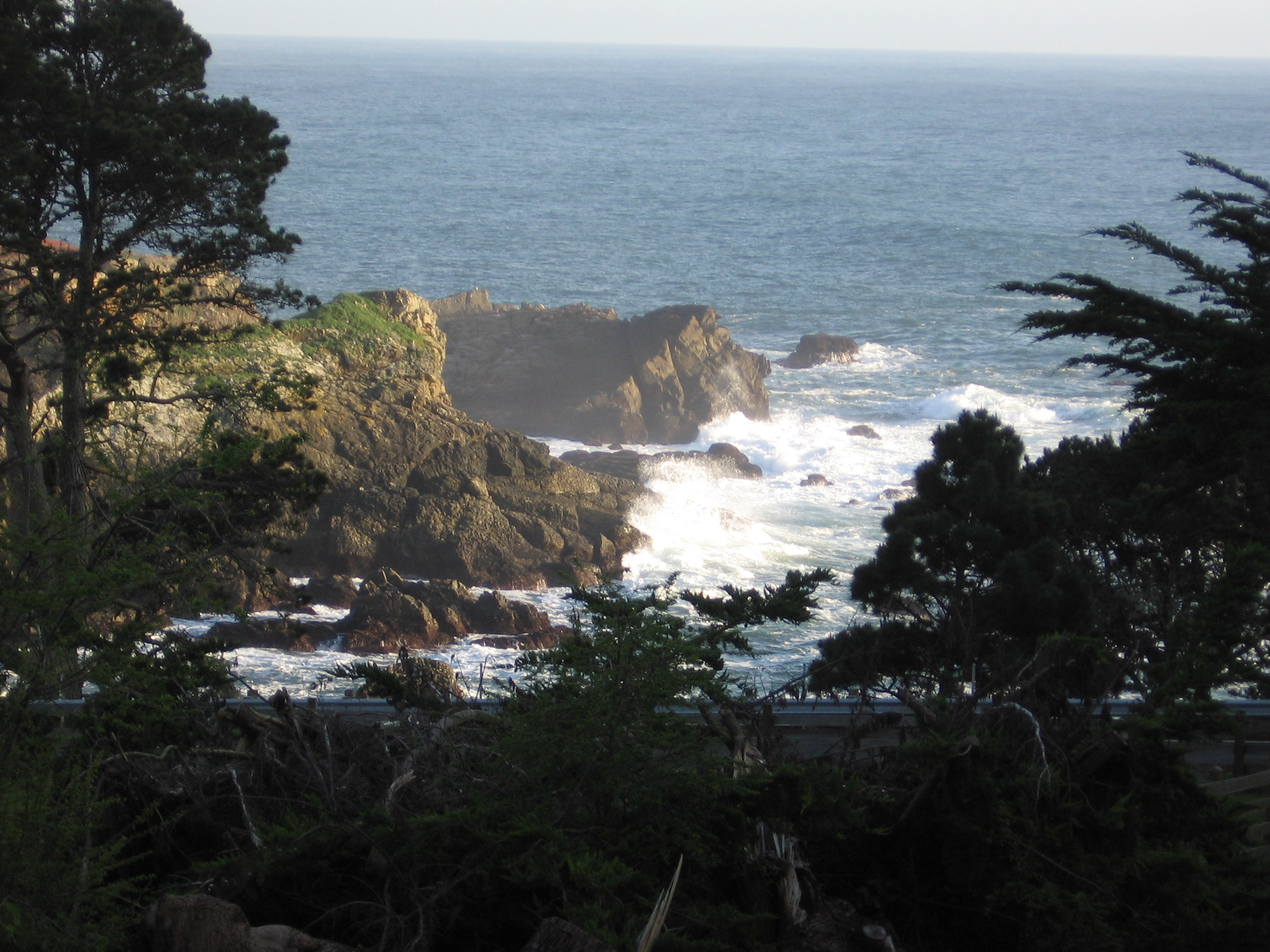
- Interactive map of Stillwater Cove Regional Park
- Location: 22455 California 1, Jenner, California
- Nearest city: Jenner, California, United States
- Coordinates: 38.548°N 123.2953°W,
- Area: 363 acres (147 ha).
- Operator: Sonoma County Regional Parks
- Open: Year round Day use
- Status: Open

Stillwater Cove Regional Park is a regional park north of Jenner, California, U.S.A. that is maintained by the Sonoma County Regional Parks Department. It is located near the mouth of Stockhoff Creek. Access is by means of State Route 1. It was one of the filming locations for 20th Century Fox's 1947 fantasy film, The Ghost and Mrs. Muir.

== Facilities and features ==
The park features beach access, a historic schoolhouse, and views of the Pacific Ocean. It also offers campsites, picnic facilities, hiking, and day use parking. It has a launch area for small boats, and is popular with divers, including abalone divers. Its restrooms have flush toilets, showers, and electrical outlets.

== See also ==
- Sonoma Coast State Beach
- Stillwater Cove
- List of beaches in Sonoma County, California
- List of California state parks
- List of Sonoma County Regional Parks facilities
