= Black Point (Sonoma County, California) =

- Headland
- Location within California
- Coordinates: 38.679°N 123.432°W
- Location: Sonoma County, California, United States
- Water bodies: North Pacific Ocean
- Elevation: 15 m (50 ft)

Black Point is a cape on the Pacific Coast of northern California in the United States. It is located in the Sea Ranch area of Sonoma County, approximately 80 miles (130 km) northwest of San Francisco and approximately 40 miles (60 km) northwest of Santa Rosa.

== Background ==
The cape juts southward approximately 250 yd (200 m) from the mainland, rising more than 50 feet (15 m) above the water.

The Sonoma County Regional Parks Department maintains a coastal access trail, parking area, and restrooms, located just off State Route 1 near milepost 50.8.

Black Point Beach, located just east of the point, is a surfing location featuring heavy swell that sometimes gets hollow.

== See also ==
- List of Sonoma County Regional Parks facilities
- Salt Point State Park
- Black Point Beach
