= Stillwater Cove =

Inlet near Fort Ross, California

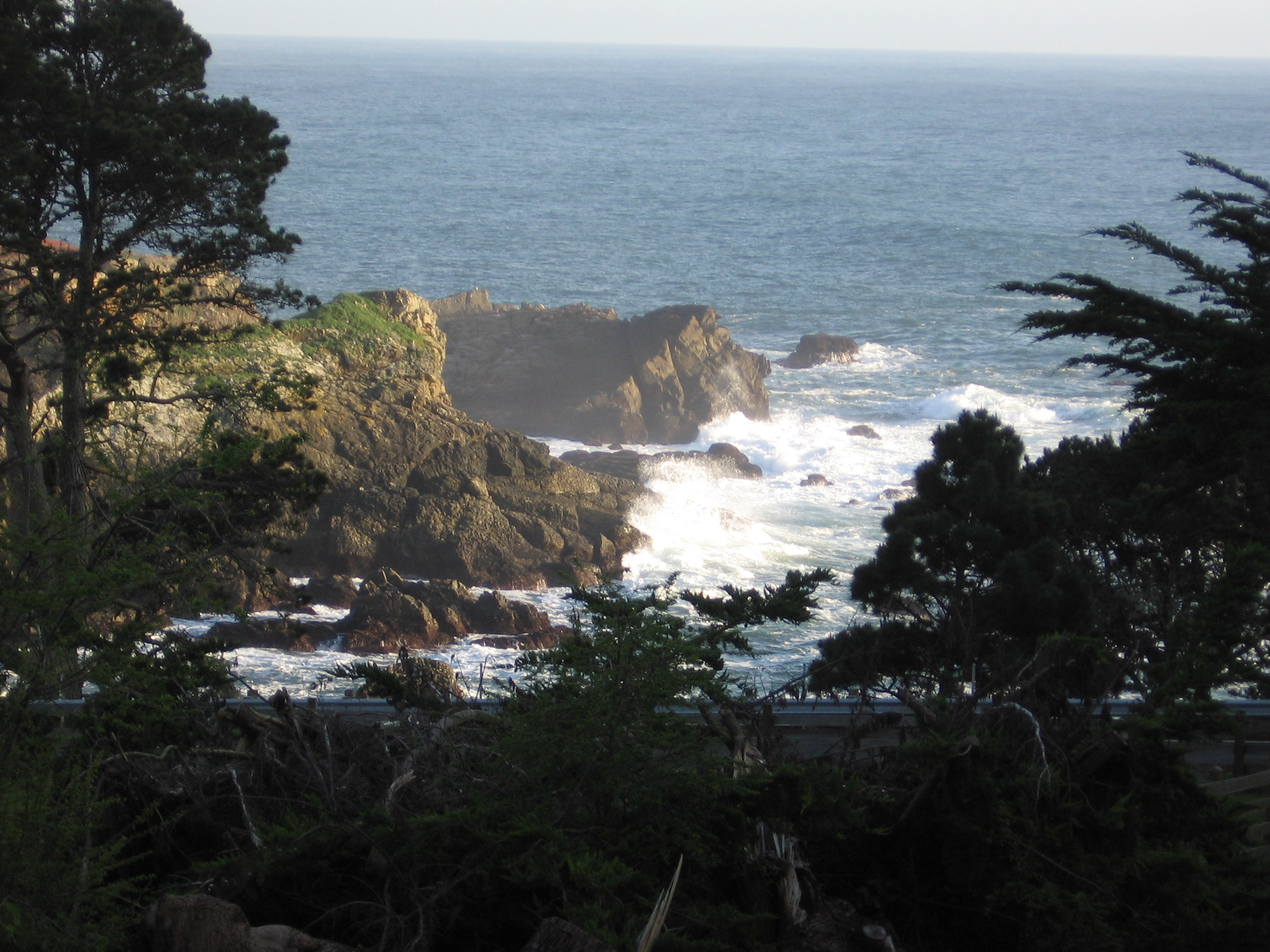
- From above

- Location: Fort Ross, California
- Coordinates: 38°32′45″N 123°17′55″W
- Type: Inlet
- Max. length: 0.13 kilometres (0.08 miles)
- Max. width: 0.16 kilometres (0.1 miles)
- Surface area: 0.03 square kilometres (0.01 square miles)
- Shore length^{1}: 0.34 kilometres (0.21 miles)
- ^{1} Shore length is not a well-defined measure.

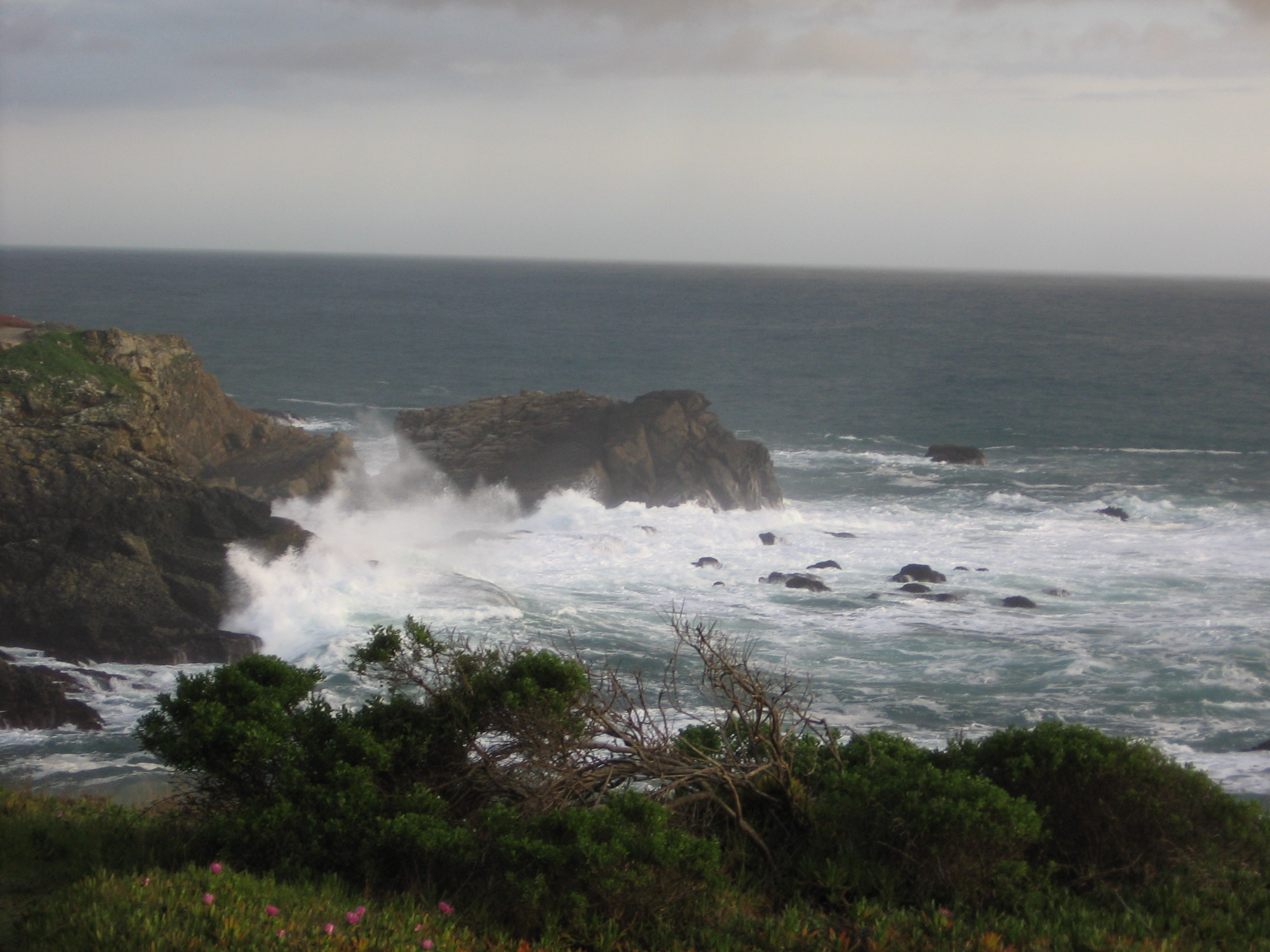
View from above in stormy weather

Stillwater Cove is an inlet between the museum and town of Fort Ross, California and Salt Point State Park. The cove is open to the public. Red abalone is hunted in the cove. It is adjacent to Stillwater Cove Regional Park. There is also a nearby ranch.

== Geology ==
Stillwater Cove is shielded from northwesterly winds, facing southward along the California coast.

It has a favorable geographical location which lets only large winter northwest swells propagate into the cove's repaired environment, refracting around Pescadero Point.

The cove's depth ranges from ~9 m to ~14 m, while the region directly surrounding the Pescadero rocks is ~12 m deep.

Stillwater Cove has been declared by the California Coastal Commission an “Area of Special Biological Significance”.

== In popular culture ==
Some scenes of the 1947 film The Ghost and Mrs. Muir were filmed at the cove.
