= Doran Regional Park =

Park in California, United States

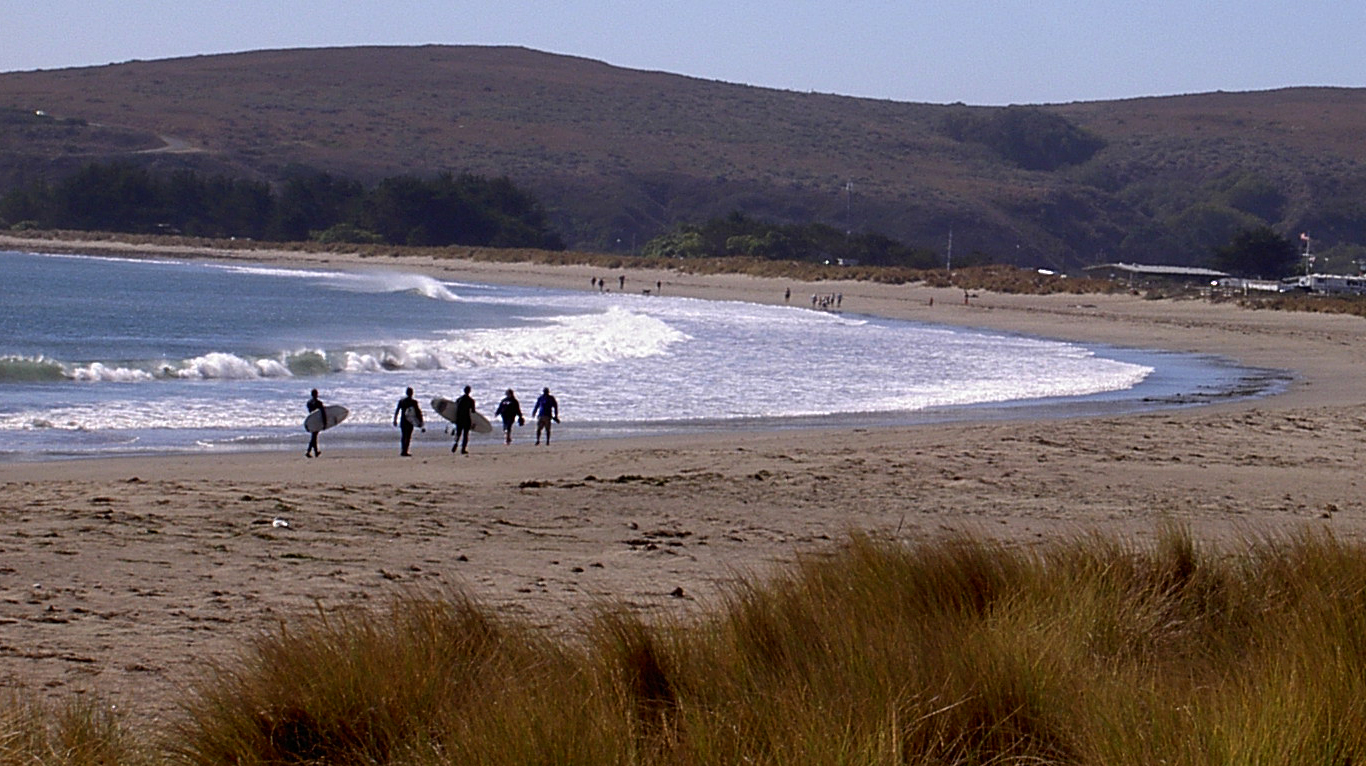
- Interactive map of Doran Regional Park
- Type: Regional park
- Location: California, U.S.
- Operator: Sonoma County Regional Parks Department

Doran Regional Park is a regional park south of Bodega Bay, California, U.S.A. that is maintained by the Sonoma County Regional Parks Department. It covers an area of 127 acres (51 ha). It is located at 38.314°N 123.0428°W on the sand spit separating Bodega Harbor from Bodega Bay. The park address is 201 Doran Beach Road, Bodega Bay, CA.

== Facilities and features ==
The park features a sandy beach (Doran Beach), a boat launch, picnic areas, and year-round camping. Other amenities include flush toilets and showers. Sea lions can sometimes be heard barking from offshore.

Doran Regional Park has 120 pet friendly campsites for tents, trailers and RVs that feature potable water, fire rings, picnic tables, and full-service restrooms with showers nearby. The Shell, Gull and Cove campgrounds are bordered by the Bodega Harbor and the Jetty campground is between the harbor and the beach.

== History ==
Doran Regional Park was once part of a ranch owned by William (Billy) Doran, who lived on a low hill just above the outer bay and south of the park. During World War II, the government took control of the bay portion of Doran Ranch through eminent domain to create a safe harbor for rescue operations and constructed the jetties at the mouth of the harbor with locally quarried rock. After the war, the land eventually passed to the County and the beach was established as a formal park in the late 1960s. The Coast Guard Station Bodega Bay is located within the boundaries of the park.

== Marine Protected Areas ==
Bodega Head State Marine Reserve & Bodega Head State Marine Conservation Area and Estero Americano State Marine Recreational Management Area protect area waters. Like underwater parks, these marine protected areas help conserve ocean wildlife and marine ecosystems.

== See also ==
- List of Sonoma County Regional Parks facilities
- List of beaches in Sonoma County, California
- List of California state parks
- Sonoma Coast State Beach
- Estero Americano Coast Preserve
