= Gualala Point Regional Park =

Regional park in California, United States

Coordinates: 38.76°N 123.522°W

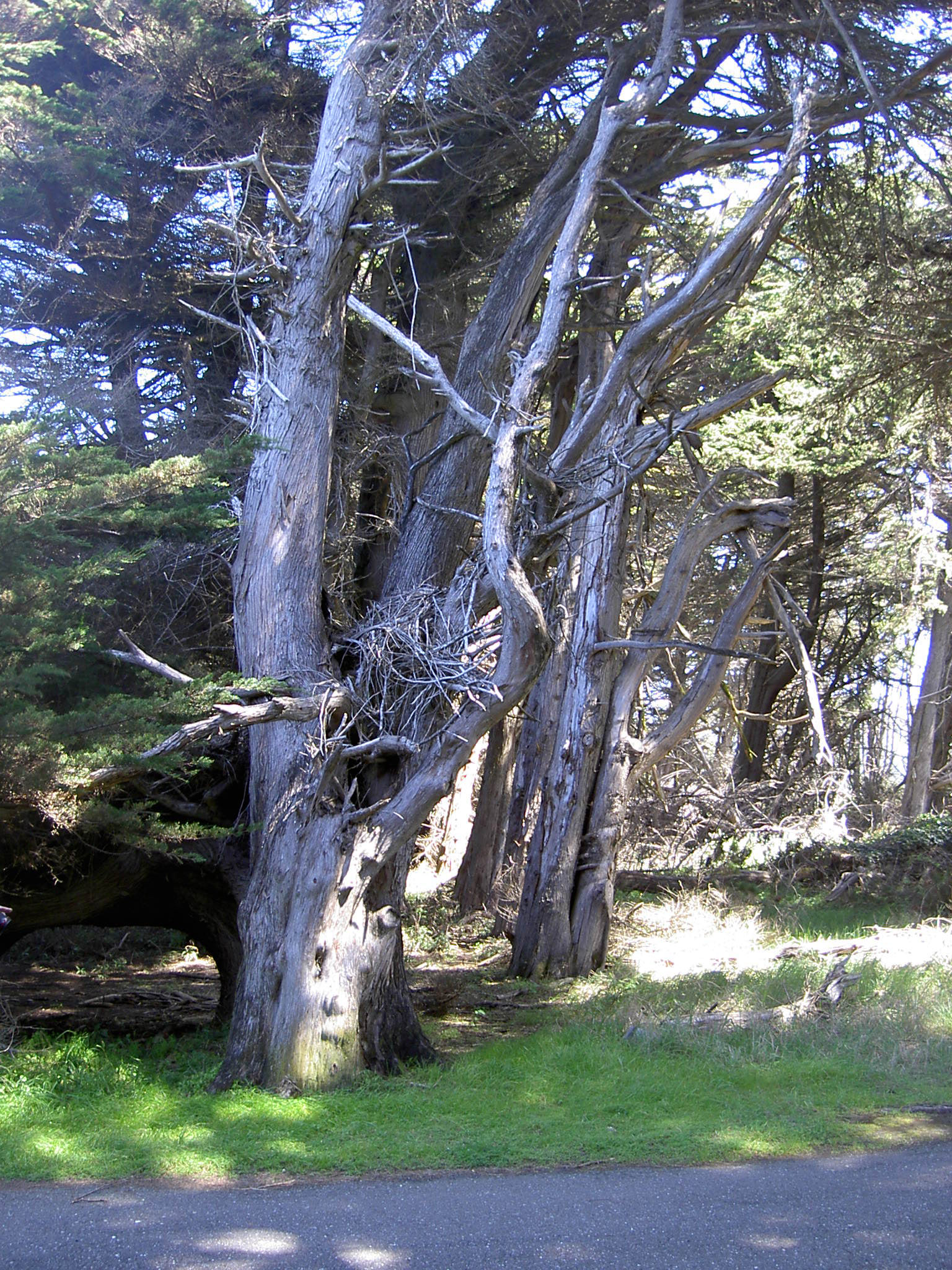
- A wooded area in Gualala Point Regional Park
- Interactive map of Gualala Point Regional Park
- Type: Regional park
- Location: 42401 State Route 1, at milepost 58.50 Sea Ranch, California, United States
- Nearest city: Gualala, California
- Operator: Sonoma County Regional Parks Department

Gualala Point Regional Park is a regional park on Gualala Point at the mouth of the Gualala River in Sonoma County, California, south of Gualala. The 103-acre (42 ha) park is maintained by the Sonoma County Regional Parks Department.

The park features a visitors center, picnic area, beach access, and views of the Pacific Ocean. It also offers redwood campsites, hiking, seasonal fishing in the Gualala River, and day use parking. Its restrooms have flush toilets, and the campground restrooms include showers and electrical outlets.

The visitors center includes informational displays on Native Americans, early California history, and the logging industry of circa 1900.

Gualala Regional Point Park offers 2.9 miles (4.7 km) of coastal trails and Gualala Point Beach is ADA accessible via a paved path. The Gualala Point Regional Park campground is located on the Eastern side of Hwy 1 and is connected to the day use area by a short forested trail.

== See also ==
- List of beaches in Sonoma County, California
- List of Sonoma County Regional Parks facilities
- List of California state parks
