= Bodega Bay =

Archaeological site in California, United States

Coordinates: 38°16′25″N 123°00′22″W

- U.S. National Register of Historic Places
- U.S. Historic district
- California Historical Landmark
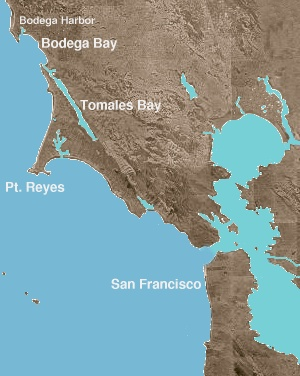
- Location of Bodega Bay and Bodega Harbor

- Location within California Location within the United States
- Nearest city: Bodega Bay, California
- Area: 3,170 acres (1,280 ha)
- Built: 1811
- NRHP reference No.: 73000461
- CHISL No.: 833

Significant dates
- Added to NRHP: December 18, 1973
- Designated CHISL: November 3, 1969

Bodega Bay (Spanish: Bahía Bodega) is a shallow, rocky inlet of the Pacific Ocean on the coast of northern California in the United States. It is approximately 5 mi (8 km) across and is located approximately 40 mi (60 km) northwest of San Francisco and 20 mi (32 km) west of Santa Rosa. The bay straddles the boundary between Sonoma County to the north and Marin County to the south. The bay is a marine habitat used for navigation, recreation (including swimming and surfing, especially by the Dillon Beach area), and commercial and sport fishing (including shellfish harvesting).

Bodega Bay is protected on its north end from the Pacific Ocean by Bodega Head, which shelters the small Bodega Harbor and is separated from the main bay by a jetty. The San Andreas Fault runs parallel to the coastline and bisects Bodega Head, which lies on the Pacific Plate; the town is on the North American Plate. The village of Bodega Bay sits on the east side of Bodega Harbor. The bay connects on its south end to the mouth of Tomales Bay.

Streams flowing into Bodega Bay include the Estero de San Antonio and the Americano Creek. Accessible beaches on Bodega Bay include Doran Regional Park (on the jetty) and Pinnacle Gulch. Apart from the harbor, all of Bodega Bay lies within the boundaries of the Gulf of the Farallones National Marine Sanctuary.

== History ==
Coast Miwok Native Americans lived on the shores of Bodega Bay. Documented village names include: Helapattai, Hime-takala, Ho-takala, and Tokau. There is speculation that Bodega Bay may have been Sir Francis Drake's Nova Albion landing location on the California coast.

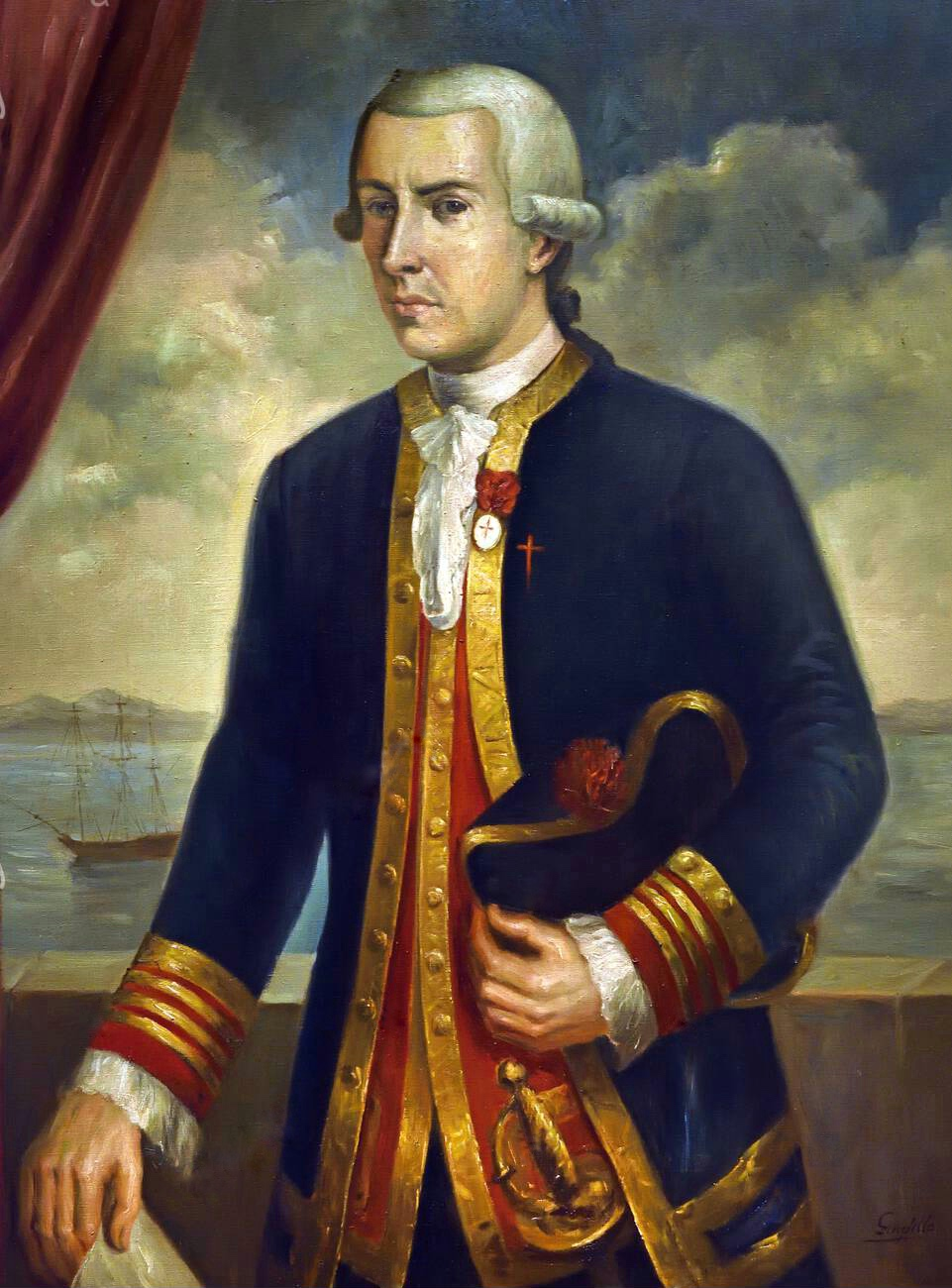
Bodega Bay is named after Juan Francisco de la Bodega y Quadra, who explored the area in 1775.

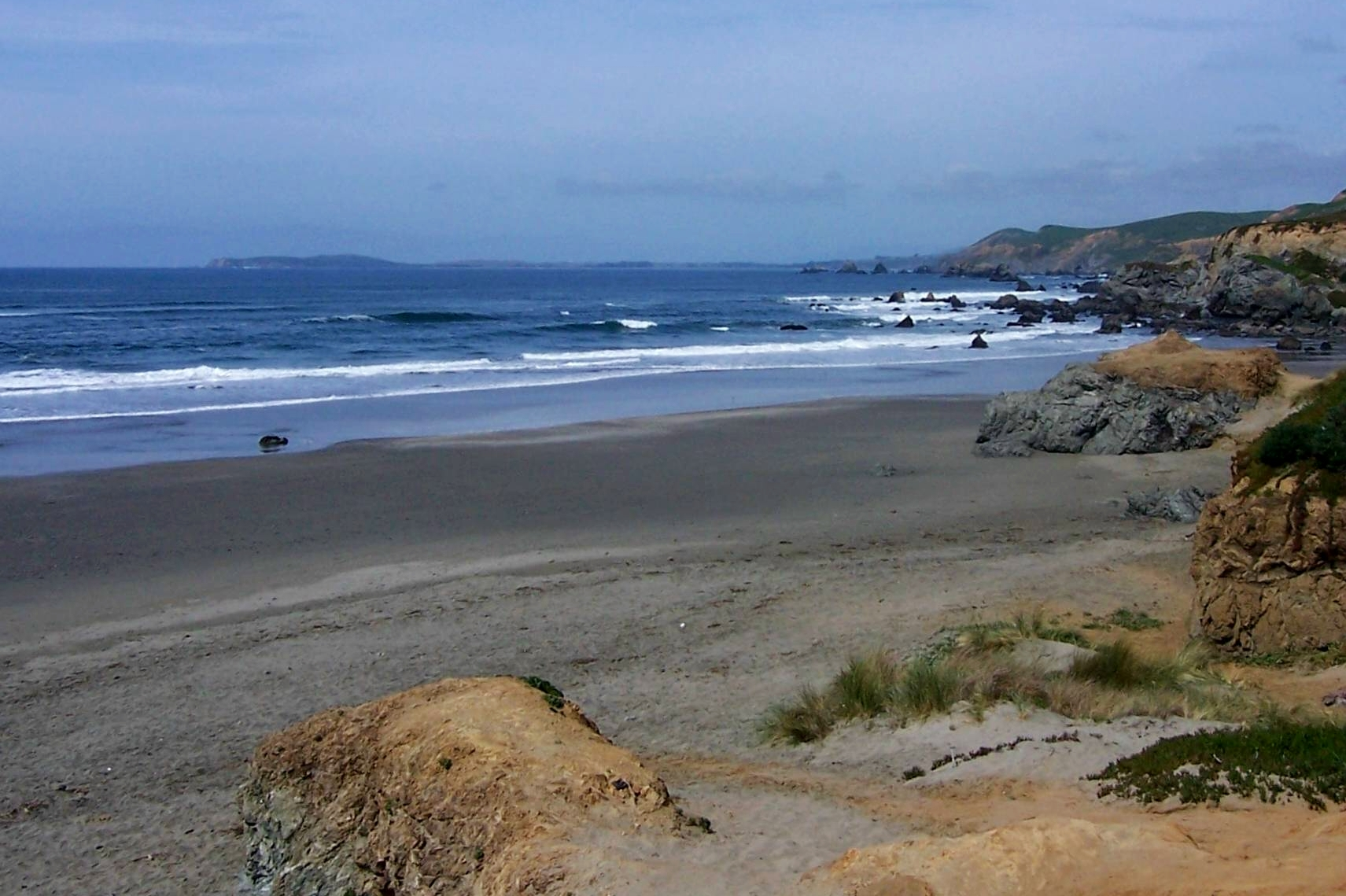
Bodega Bay viewed from Dillon Beach.

Bodega Bay was first charted by Europeans in 1775 by the Spanish Peruvian explorer Juan Francisco de la Bodega y Quadra of the Spanish Navy. The bay that was originally named for him was not present day Bodega Bay, but Tomales Bay. His ship, the Sonora, anchored in the lee of Tomales Point on October 3, 1775, departing the next day. Bodega y Quadra named Tomales Bay Puerto de la Bodega. "There is no evidence in the journal or on the charts that Bodega y Quadra ever saw the entrance to [present day] Bodega Harbor or knew of the lagoon to the north". Bodega y Quadra planned to return, but was not able to. Later, as commandant of the naval base at San Blas, New Spain, Bodega y Quadra sent other expeditions to Bodega Bay with the intention of establishing a colony and mission there. It was decided, however, that the location was not ideal.

The first Russians to see Bodega Bay were the Russian-American Company (RAC) supervisors of the Aleut hunting parties aboard the American maritime fur trade sea otter hunting ship Peacock in 1807. Timofei Nikitich Tarakanov of the RAC returned to Novo Arkhangelsk, Alaska, and reported the location to Alexander Andreyevich Baranov, the chief administrator of the RAC. Baranov instructed his assistant Ivan Kuskov to survey the area for a settlement. Kuskov, the Commerce Counselor of the RAC sailing in the Kodiak (also transliterated as Kadiak and Kad'iak), entered Bodega Bay on January 8, 1809. Temporary buildings were erected to house the ship's complement of 190 crew (130 native Alaskan males, 20 native females, and 40 Russians).

The Kodiak remained in Bodega Bay until October, 1809, returning to Alaska with more than 2,000 sea otter pelts. Kuskov returned to Novo Arkhangelsk, reporting abundant fur bearing mammals, fish, timber and tillable lands. Baranov instructed Kuskov to return and establish a permanent settlement in the area. In 1811, Kuskov returned, this time aboard the Chirikov, but found fewer otter in Bodega Bay (1,160 otter skins were taken). Three American ships were also operating in the area from a base in Drake's Bay, sending hunters into San Francisco Bay and the surrounding bays.

Kuskov sailed the brig Chirikov back to present day Bodega Harbor on March 15, 1812. Kuskov named it in honor of the Russian Minister of Commerce, Count Nikolai Petrovich Rumyantsev. During 1812 Kuskov had Fort Ross built. Bodega Bay, located about 20 mi (32 km) south, served as the primary port for Fort Ross. RAC ships often stopped at Bodega Bay for repairs, such as the Il'mena, which was laid up at Bodega Bay for repairs from September 1815 to April 1816.

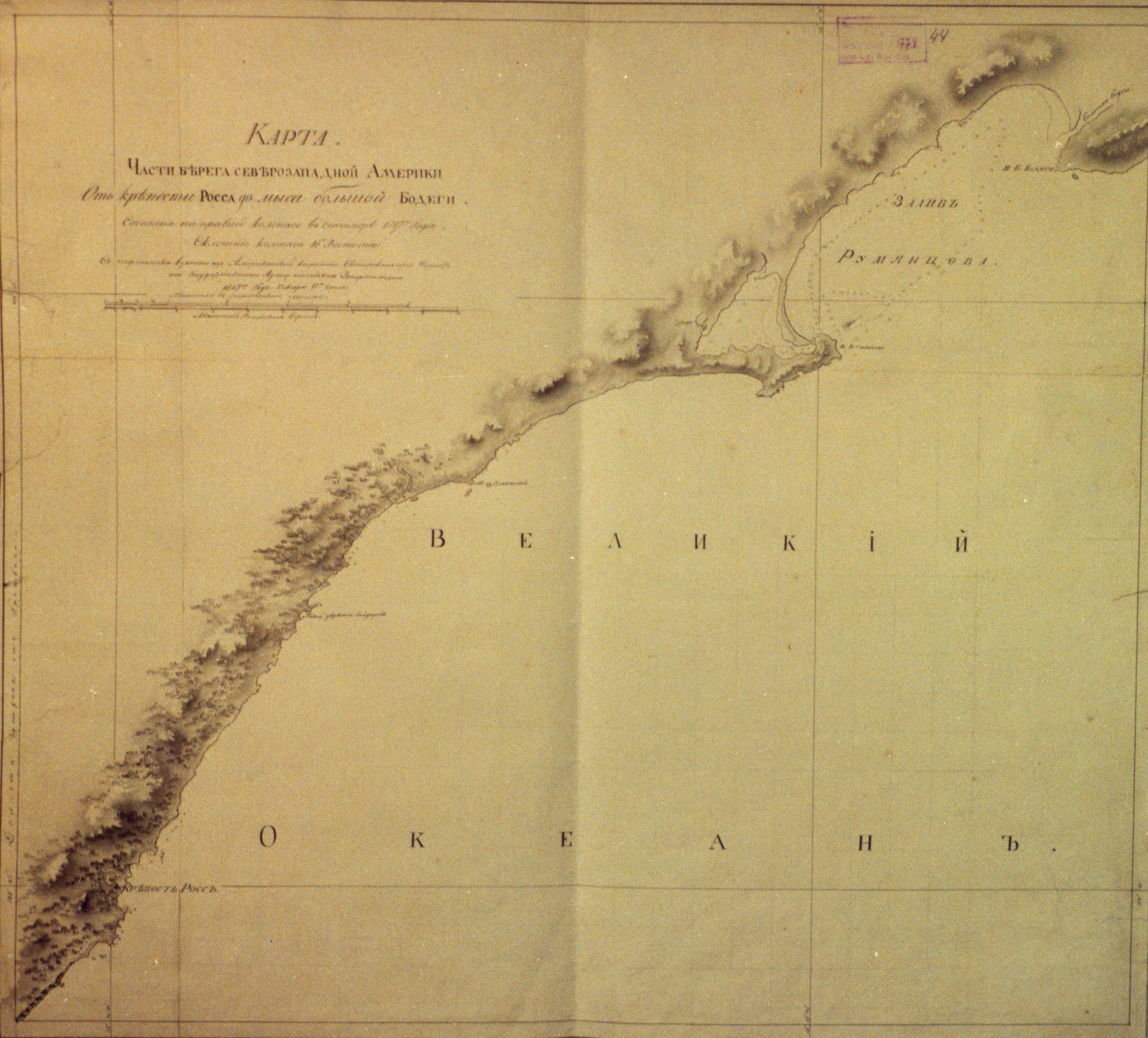
Russian chart of Fort Ross to Bodega Bay, 1817-18. Bodega Harbor and Bay appear in the upper right.

Zaliv Rumyantsev (Rumyantsev Bay, also transliterated "Rumiantsov" and "Rumiantsev") appears on the earliest Russian charts of Bodega Bay (1817–1819) identifying present day Bodega Bay and Bodega Harbor. Bodega Head was named Mouis Rumyantsev (Point Rumyantsev). Tomales Point was named Point Great Bodega and Tomales Bay Great Bodega Bay, more or less conforming to Bodega y Quadra's original naming.

On his return trip, Kuskov found the otter population scarce in Bodega Bay, and the harbor being frequented by numerous American and British otter-hunting expeditions. After exploring the area, they ended up selecting a place 15 mi (24 km) north that the native Kashaya Pomo people called Mad shui nui or Metini. Metini, the seasonal home of the native Kashaya Pomo people, had a modest anchorage and abundant natural resources and would become the Russian settlement of Fort Ross.

By 1817, sea otters in this area were practically eliminated by international over-hunting. Zaliv Rumyantsev continued to be the main entrepôt for the Russian Colony until January 1842, and the earliest European structures built at Bodega Bay were the RAC wharf, warehouse, and barracks.

After the Mexican–American War and the 1848 Mexican Cession Bodega Bay became United States territory. It remained an active harbor for shipping lumber until the 1870s, when the North Pacific Coast Railroad was built, bypassing the coast in favor of a more inland route.

A plan by Pacific Gas & Electric to build a nuclear power plant received significant negative attention from local citizens, beginning in 1958. By 1964, the plans for the plant were abandoned.

Bodega Bay was the setting for the 1963 Alfred Hitchcock film The Birds starring Rod Taylor, Tippi Hedren and Suzanne Pleshette.

In October, 2017, Bodega Bay, on the northwest edge of Sonoma County, served as a site of refuge and supply depot for evacuees who are escaping from a historic, fast-moving, destructive fire in northern California, especially residents from that area. People from Santa Rosa and other regions affected by the raging wildfire started pouring in not long after the blazes started.

== Marine protected areas near Bodega Bay ==
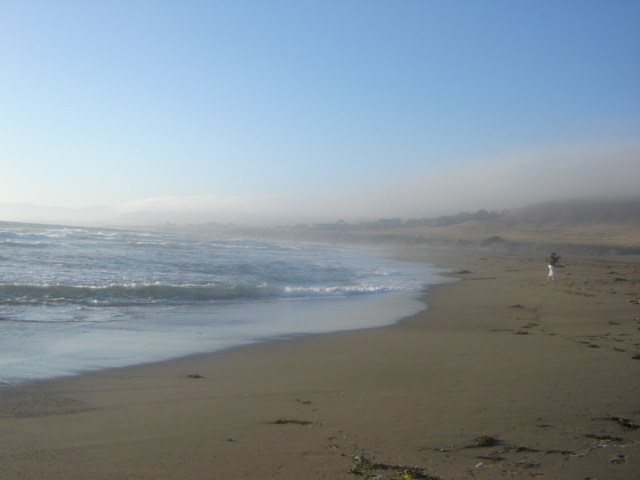
Bodega Bay, photographed on July 16th, 2007.

Like underwater parks, these marine protected areas help conserve ocean wildlife and marine ecosystems.

- Russian River State Marine Reserve and Russian River State Marine Conservation Area
- Bodega Head State Marine Reserve & Bodega Head State Marine Conservation Area
- Estero Americano State Marine Recreational Management Area
- Estero de San Antonio State Marine Recreational Management Area

== See also ==
- Film locations in Sonoma County, California
- Anti-nuclear movement in California
