= Bodega Bay, California =

Bodega Bay
- Census-designated place
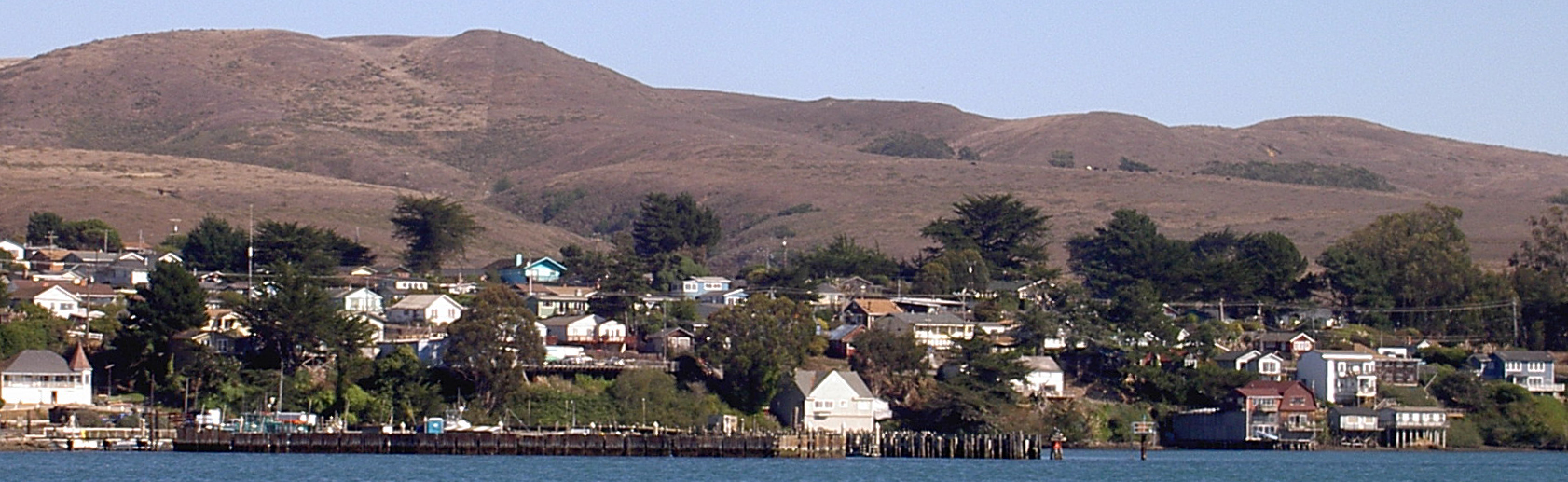
- Bodega Bay in 2008, seen from across the harbor

- Location in Sonoma County and the state of California

- Location in the United States
- Coordinates: 38°19′28″N 123°2′19″W
- Country: United States
- State: California
- County: Sonoma

Area
  - Total: 12.53 sq mi (32.44 km^{2})
  - Land: 8.34 sq mi (21.61 km^{2})
  - Water: 4.18 sq mi (10.82 km^{2}) 33.37%
- Elevation: 56 ft (17 m)

Population (2020)
  - Total: 912
  - Density: 109/sq mi (42.2/km^{2})
- Time zone: UTC−8 (Pacific)
  - Summer (DST): UTC−7 (PDT)
- ZIP Code: 94923
- Area code: 707
- FIPS code: 06-07260
- GNIS feature IDs: 1658093, 2407872

Bodega Bay is a village and census-designated place (CDP) in Sonoma County, California, United States. The population was 912 at the 2020 census. The town, located along State Route 1, is on the eastern side of Bodega Harbor, an inlet of Bodega Bay on the Pacific coast.

== History ==
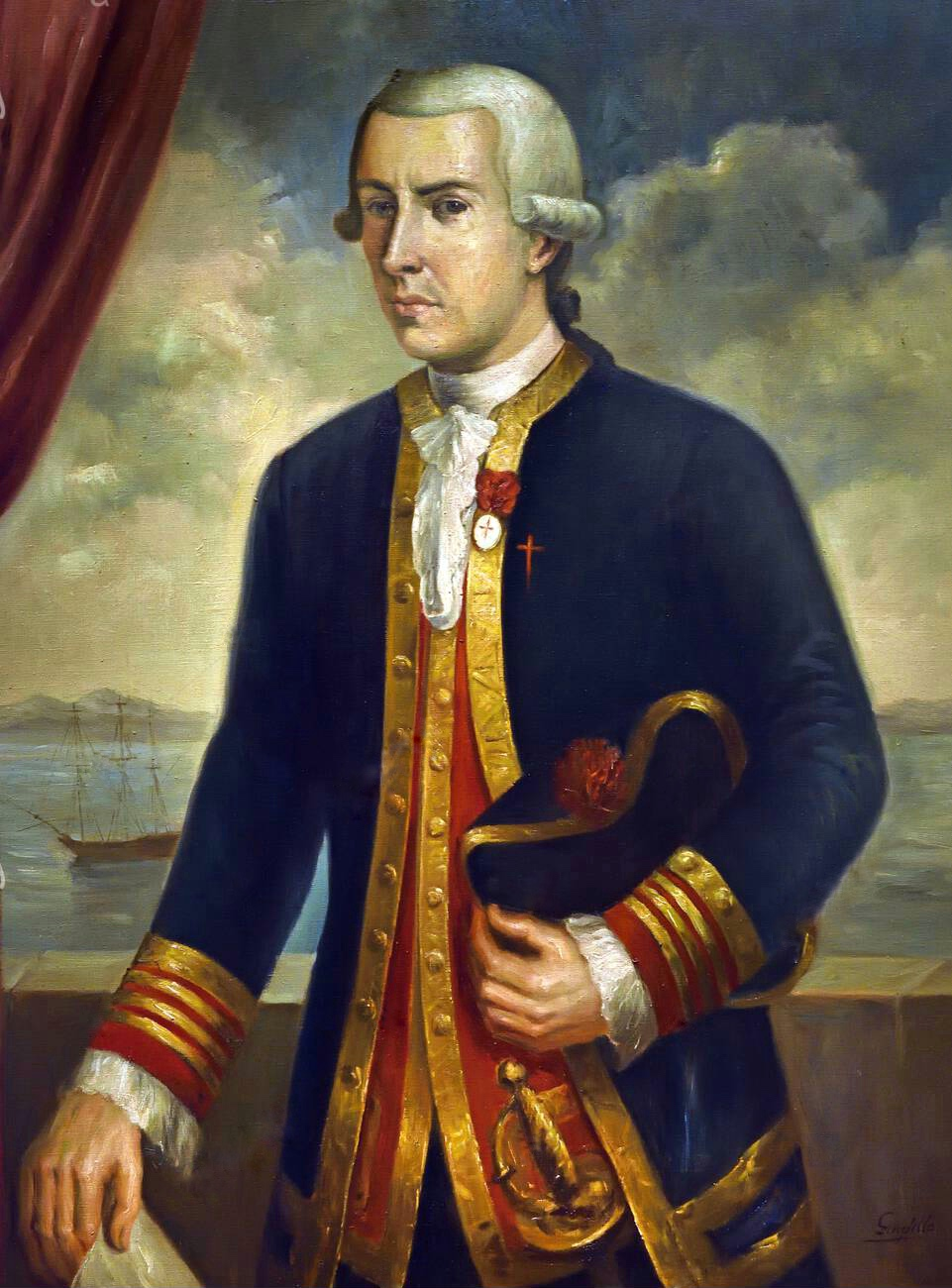
Bodega Bay is named after Juan Francisco de la Bodega y Quadra, who explored Bodega Bay in 1775.

The port of Bodega was occupied for a short time, in 1793, by a Spanish garrison and four guns, which were soon removed, however, to Monterey, there being no indication of the threatened English occupation which had caused the alarm.

Bodega Bay is the site of the first Russian structures built in California, which were erected in 1809 by Commerce Counseller Ivan Alexandrovich Kuskov of the Russian-American Company in the lead-up to the establishment of Fort Ross. The Russians named the Bodega Bay settlement Port Rumyantsev after the Russian Foreign Minister Nikolai Petrovich Rumyantsev, and it served as a port to support Fort Ross and the larger Russian community known as Colony Ross.

The town is now named in honor of Juan Francisco de la Bodega y Quadra, a Spanish naval officer who explored the west coast of North America as far north as Alaska during multiple voyages of discovery in the late 18th century.

The location scenes in the Alfred Hitchcock-directed film The Birds (1963) were filmed in both Bodega Bay and nearby Bodega (though both were represented as being parts of the film's Bodega Bay.) The town markets itself by using the film in many ways, including its Birds-themed visitors' center although none of the film's primary locations is found there. The church and the schoolhouse shown in the film are on the Bodega Highway in Bodega. The town also featured in the cult horror film Puppet Master (1989).

The Pacific Gas and Electric Company (PG&E) wanted to build a nuclear power plant at Gaffney Point on Bodega Head, across the bay from the town, in the 1960s, but the plans were shut down after a large protest (the first for environmental reasons) and the geologic fault which was found while it was digging the hole for the first reactor. The hole filled with water and became known as "The Hole in the Head".

== Government ==
In the California State Legislature, Bodega Bay is in the 2nd senatorial district, represented by Democrat Mike McGuire, and in the 2nd Assembly district, represented by Democrat Chris Rogers.

In the United States House of Representatives, Bodega Bay is in California's 2nd congressional district, represented by Democrat Jared Huffman.

== Education ==
The majority of Bodega Bay is in the Shoreline Unified School District. Shoreline USD operates the Bodega Bay School. The district's high school is Tomales High School.

A northeast portion of Bodega Bay is instead in the Harmony Union School District and the West Sonoma County Union High School District.

== Geography ==
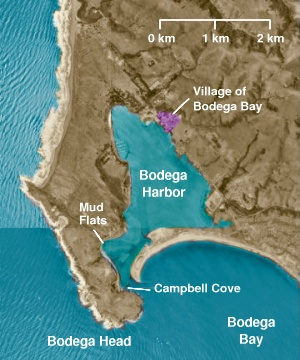
The village of Bodega Bay on Bodega Harbor

According to the United States Census Bureau, the CDP has a total area of 12.5 square miles (32 km^{2}), of which 8.3 square miles (21 km^{2}) is land and 4.2 square miles (11 km^{2}) (33.37%) is water. The town lies on the edge of Bodega Harbor. Bodega Bay itself extends south along the coast to Tomales Bay. North of town lies a long coastal exposure of alternating rock outcrops and sandy beaches which is known as Sonoma Coast State Beach. South of town, the coastline includes Doran Regional Park, Estero Americano Coast Preserve, and the Estero Americano estuary at the Sonoma–Marin county boundary.

== Climate ==
This region experiences warm (but not hot) and dry summers, with no average monthly temperatures above 71.6 °F (22.0 °C). According to the Köppen Climate Classification system, Bodega Bay has a warm-summer Mediterranean climate, abbreviated "Csb" on climate maps. Like much of the California coast, summer afternoons are often cool and windy (and sometimes foggy) as winds blow in off the ocean.

Climate data for Bodega Marine Laboratory, California, 1991–2020 normals
Month	Jan	Feb	Mar	Apr	May	Jun	Jul	Aug	Sep	Oct	Nov	Dec	Year
Mean daily maximum °F (°C)	55.9 (13.3)	56.0 (13.3)	57.1 (13.9)	56.9 (13.8)	58.4 (14.7)	60.6 (15.9)	61.9 (16.6)	62.8 (17.1)	65.7 (18.7)	62.1 (16.7)	59.1 (15.1)	53.5 (11.9)	59.2 (15.1)
Daily mean °F (°C)	50.4 (10.2)	50.5 (10.3)	51.3 (10.7)	51.5 (10.8)	53.1 (11.7)	55.0 (12.8)	56.5 (13.6)	57.4 (14.1)	58.3 (14.6)	55.7 (13.2)	52.8 (11.6)	49.9 (9.9)	53.5 (12.0)
Mean daily minimum °F (°C)	44.9 (7.2)	45.0 (7.2)	45.5 (7.5)	46.0 (7.8)	47.7 (8.7)	49.4 (9.7)	51.1 (10.6)	52.0 (11.1)	50.9 (10.5)	49.3 (9.6)	46.5 (8.1)	44.4 (6.9)	47.7 (8.7)
Average precipitation inches (mm)	5.31 (135)	6.04 (153)	3.88 (99)	2.24 (57)	1.16 (29)	0.48 (12)	0.15 (3.8)	0.11 (2.8)	0.18 (4.6)	1.81 (46)	2.91 (74)	4.63 (118)	28.9 (734.2)
Source: NOAA

== Demographics ==
Historical population
Census	Pop.	Note	%±
1990	1,127		—
2000	1,423		26.3%
2010	1,077		−24.3%
2020	912		−15.3%
U.S. Decennial Census; 1860–1870 1880-1890; 1900 1910 1920; 1930 1940 1950; 1960 1970 1980; 1990 2000 2010; 2020

Bodega Bay first appeared as a census designated place in the 1990 U.S. census.

=== Racial and ethnic composition ===
Bodega Bay CDP, California – Racial and ethnic composition Note: the US Census treats Hispanic/Latino as an ethnic category. This table excludes Latinos from the racial categories and assigns them to a separate category. Hispanics/Latinos may be of any race.
Race / Ethnicity (NH = Non-Hispanic)	Pop 2000	Pop 2010	Pop 2020	% 2000	% 2010	% 2020
White alone (NH)	1,142	874	732	80.25%	81.15%	80.26%
Black or African American alone (NH)	5	2	2	0.35%	0.19%	0.22%
Native American or Alaska Native alone (NH)	18	4	0	1.26%	0.37%	0.00%
Asian alone (NH)	19	33	20	1.34%	3.06%	2.19%
Native Hawaiian or Pacific Islander alone (NH)	0	4	0	0.00%	0.37%	0.00%
Other race alone (NH)	2	2	10	0.14%	0.19%	1.10%
Mixed race or Multiracial (NH)	21	32	41	1.48%	2.97%	4.50%
Hispanic or Latino (any race)	216	126	107	15.18%	11.70%	11.73%
Total	1,423	1,077	912	100.00%	100.00%	100.00%

=== 2020 census ===
As of the 2020 census, Bodega Bay had a population of 912. The median age was 63.9 years. 7.7% of residents were under the age of 18 and 47.5% of residents were 65 years of age or older. For every 100 females there were 100.9 males, and for every 100 females age 18 and over there were 100.0 males age 18 and over.

0.0% of residents lived in urban areas, while 100.0% lived in rural areas.

There were 460 households in Bodega Bay, of which 10.2% had children under the age of 18 living in them. Of all households, 53.3% were married-couple households, 18.7% were households with a male householder and no spouse or partner present, and 23.9% were households with a female householder and no spouse or partner present. About 32.4% of all households were made up of individuals and 16.5% had someone living alone who was 65 years of age or older.

There were 1,009 housing units, of which 54.4% were vacant. The homeowner vacancy rate was 1.9% and the rental vacancy rate was 40.8%.

Racial composition as of the 2020 census
Race	Number	Percent
White	738	80.9%
Black or African American	2	0.2%
American Indian and Alaska Native	3	0.3%
Asian	20	2.2%
Native Hawaiian and Other Pacific Islander	0	0.0%
Some other race	61	6.7%
Two or more races	88	9.6%

=== American Community Survey ===
As of 2022, 94.5% of residents in Bodega Bay, CA, held U.S. citizenship.

In 2022, 73.8% of housing units in Bodega Bay, CA, were owner-occupied, marking an increase from the previous year's rate of 61.8%.

Between 2021 and 2022, employment in Bodega Bay, CA, saw a decline of 10.8%, from 609 employees to 543. The top employment sectors for Bodega Bay residents include Agriculture, Forestry, Fishing & Hunting (96 people), Construction (70 people), and Transportation & Warehousing (70 people).

=== 2010 Census ===
The 2010 United States census reported that Bodega Bay had a population of 1,077. The population density was 86.0 inhabitants per square mile (33.2/km^{2}). The ethnic makeup of Bodega Bay was 951 (88.3%) White, 2 (0.2%) African American, 4 (0.4%) Native American, 33 (3.1%) Asian, 4 (0.4%) Pacific Islander, 49 (4.5%) from other races, and 34 (3.2%) from two or more races. Hispanic or Latino of any race were 126 persons (11.7%).

The Census reported that 99.0% of the population lived in households and 1.0% lived in non-institutionalized group quarters.

There were 533 households, out of which 77 (14.4%) had children under the age of 18 living in them, 278 (52.2%) were opposite-sex married couples living together, 22 (4.1%) had a female householder with no husband present, 14 (2.6%) had a male householder with no wife present. There were 33 (6.2%) unmarried opposite-sex partnerships, and 8 (1.5%) same-sex married couples or partnerships. 170 households (31.9%) were made up of individuals, and 67 (12.6%) had someone living alone who was 65 years of age or older. The average household size was 2.00. There were 314 families (58.9% of all households); the average family size was 2.48.

The population was spread out, with 131 people (12.2%) under the age of 18, 52 people (4.8%) aged 18 to 24, 172 people (16.0%) aged 25 to 44, 409 people (38.0%) aged 45 to 64, and 313 people (29.1%) who were 65 years of age or older. The median age was 57.2 years. For every 100 females, there were 105.9 males. For every 100 females age 18 and over, there were 106.1 males.

There were 1,060 housing units at an average density of 84.6 units per square mile (32.7 units/km^{2}), of which 67.9% were owner-occupied and 32.1% were occupied by renters. The homeowner vacancy rate was 4.6%; the rental vacancy rate was 23.7%. 65.3% of the population lived in owner-occupied housing units and 33.7% lived in rental housing units.

=== 2000 Census ===
As of the census of 2000, there were 1,423 people, 669 households, and 432 families residing in the CDP. The population density was 169.7 inhabitants per square mile (65.5/km^{2}). There were 1,144 housing units at an average density of 136.4 units per square mile (52.7 units/km^{2}). The racial makeup of the CDP was 85.52% White, 0.35% African American, 1.55% Native American, 1.34% Asian, 9.07% from other races, and 2.18% from two or more races. Hispanic or Latino of any race were 15.18% of the population. There were 669 households, out of which 14.5% had children under the age of 18 living with them, 57.5% were married couples living together, 3.9% had a female householder with no husband present, and 35.4% were non-families. 27.2% of all households were made up of individuals, and 9.1% had someone living alone who was 65 years of age or older. The average household size was 2.11 and the average family size was 2.47.

In the CDP, the population was 12.7% under the age of 18, 6.2% from 18 to 24, 21.7% from 25 to 44, 36.5% from 45 to 64, and 22.8% who were 65 years of age or older. The median age was 51 years. For every 100 females, there were 108.0 males. For every 100 females age 18 and over, there were 106.3 males. The median income for a household in the CDP was $56,818, and the median income for a family was $60,750. Males had a median income of $27,778 versus $28,375 for females. The per capita income for the CDP was $37,226. About 2.0% of families and 4.0% of the population were below the poverty line. This includes none of those under the age of eighteen or sixty-five or over.

== Notable people ==
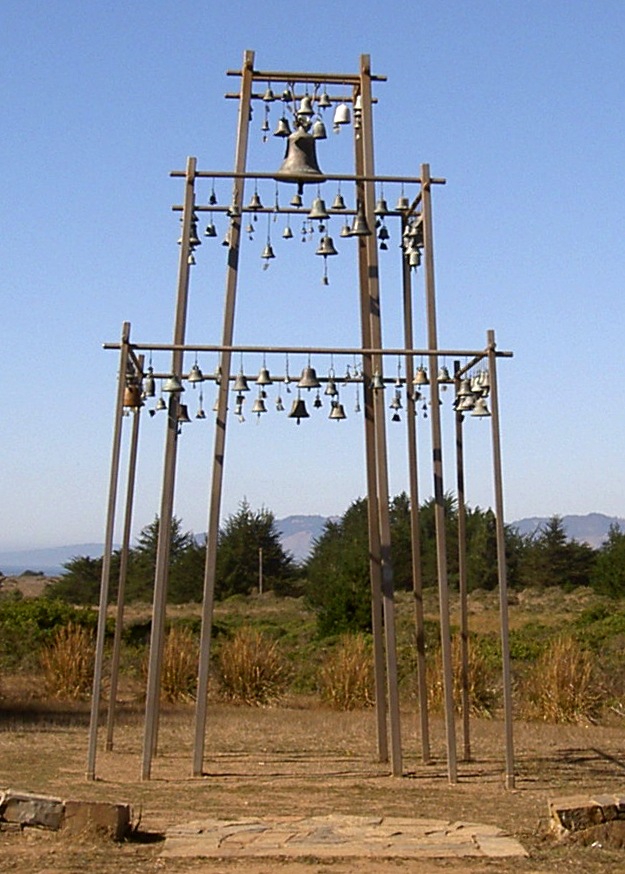
Memorial inspired by the death of Nicholas Green

Bodega Bay was the hometown of Nicholas Green, the American child shot dead during a robbery by highwaymen in Italy where his family were on vacation in 1994. Nicholas and his family became famous when almost every organ or body part was donated to those in need following his death.

Erden Eruç made history here when he completed the first entirely solo and entirely human-powered circumnavigation of the Earth. He began the expedition on July 10, 2007, in Bodega Bay and returned a little more than five years later on July 21, 2012.

== Film locations ==
Bodega Bay has served as a location for several major films and TV shows:

- The Birds (1963): Except for a short sequence at the beginning filmed in San Francisco, most of the film's exterior scenes were filmed around the two towns of Bodega (a small inland village) and Bodega Bay (a larger village on the bay), which were made to appear as one. Special sites used for shooting included Potter School, the Bay, and the home and barn across the bay from the town of Bodega Bay.
- The Russians Are Coming, the Russians Are Coming (1966) Some scenes filmed in Bodega Bay.
- The Pack (1977): Filmed around Bodega Bay.
- The Fog (1980)
- The Goonies (1985): The ending was shot at Goat Rock Beach.
- Puppet Master (1989): Setting is Bodega Bay for the first two, fourth and fifth films.
- Sleepwalkers (1992): Opening scene filmed in Bodega Bay.
- Hart to Hart: Home Is Where the Hart Is (1994 TV movie): Exterior scenes of the town.
- I Know What You Did Last Summer (1997): Scenes around the road accident.
- Road Trip with Huell Howser Episode 117 (2002)
- It's Always Sunny in Philadelphia (2021): Season 15's multi-episode arc was originally going to be filmed in Ireland. But due to COVID-19 restrictions, Bodega Bay was used as the stand-in for those episodes.

== Other facilities ==
A branch of the University of California operates a marine lab at Bodega Bay, the Bodega Marine Laboratory.

A nuclear power plant had been planned for Bodega Bay in the 1960s but was abandoned after both local and statewide protests and the discovery of the San Andreas Fault near the proposed site. Excavation for the site began at Bodega Head, and since the project was abandoned the area has been referred to by locals as "The Hole in the Head."

== See also ==
- Bodega Bay Nuclear Power Plant
- Anti-nuclear movement in California
