= Crane Creek (California) =

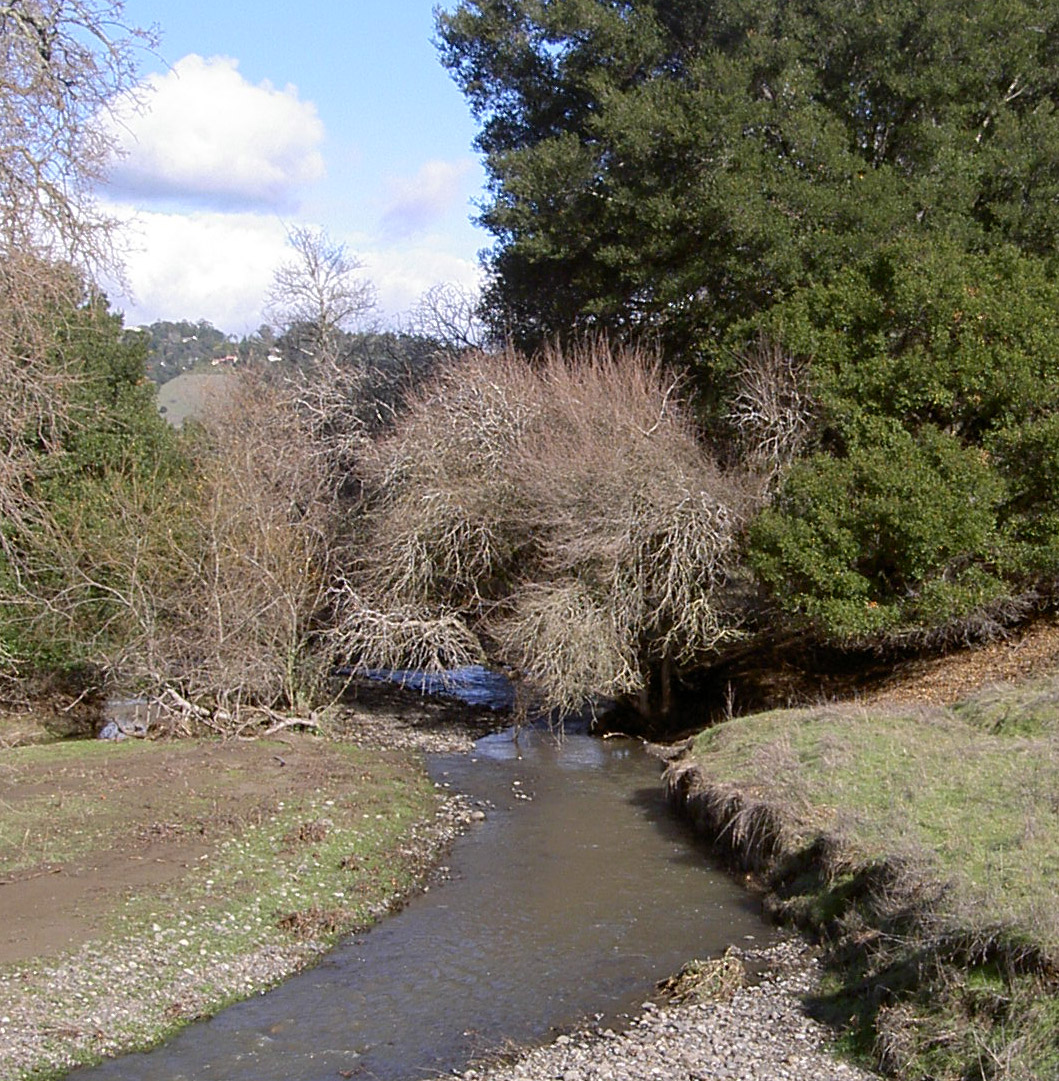
- Crane Creek east of Rohnert Park

- Location of the mouth of Crane Creek in California

Location
- Country: United States
- State: California
- Region: Sonoma County
- City: Rohnert Park, California

Physical characteristics
- Source
  - location: Sonoma Mountain
  - coordinates: 38°21′4″N 122°36′4″W
  - elevation: 1,535 ft (468 m)
- Mouth: Hinebaugh Creek
  - location: Rohnert Park, California
  - coordinates: 38°21′19″N 122°41′26″W
  - elevation: 112 ft (34 m)

Crane Creek is a stream in Sonoma County, California, United States which rises in the northern Sonoma Mountains. This watercourse flows through Crane Canyon and the Crane Creek Regional Park situated on the northwestern flank of Sonoma Mountain. Crane Creek forms a confluence with Hinebaugh Creek in the city of Rohnert Park; thereafter, the channelized Hinebaugh Creek flows westerly to discharge to the Laguna de Santa Rosa. Hiking access to the upper Crane Creek reaches is from Roberts Road off Petaluma Hill Road.

== See also ==
- Fairfield Osborn Preserve
- Five Creek
- List of watercourses in the San Francisco Bay Area
