= Five Creek =

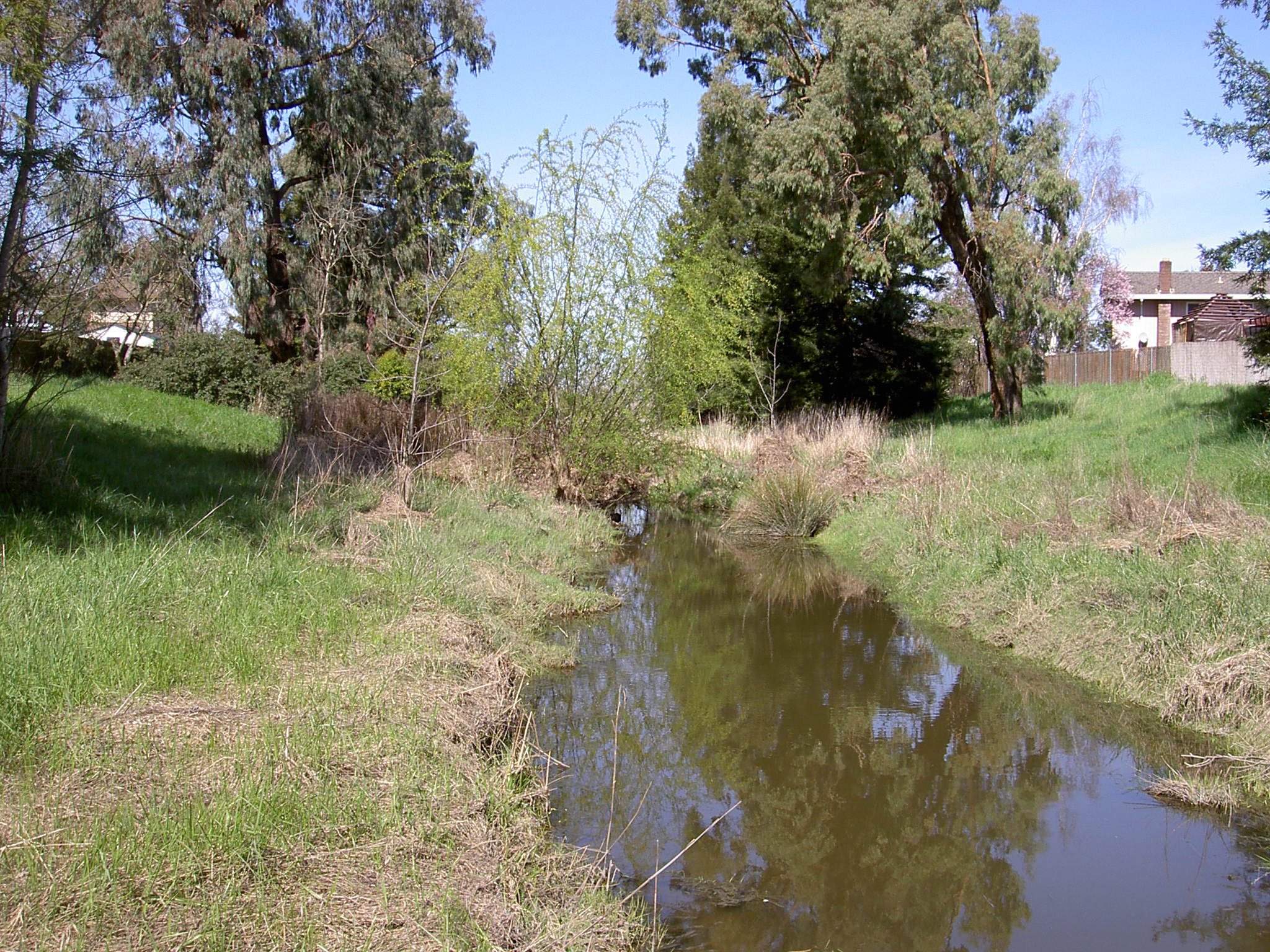
- Five Creek north of the golf course

- Location of the mouth of Five Creek in California

Location
- Country: United States
- State: California
- Region: Sonoma County
- City: Rohnert Park, California

Physical characteristics
- Source
  - location: Rohnert Park, California
- Mouth: Laguna de Santa Rosa
  - location: west of Rohnert Park, California
  - coordinates: 38°21′8″N 122°44′24″W
  - elevation: 85 ft (26 m)

Five Creek is a westward flowing stream that rises in the city of Rohnert Park, California, United States and discharges to the Laguna de Santa Rosa. The creek is channelized as it flows through the city and runs in an artificially rectilinear fashion. Considered waters of the United States as a jurisdictional matter, Five Creek has potential habitat for the California red-legged frog and the Western pond turtle.

The name probably originated as a misreading of "Fire Creek," the name found on older maps.

== Course ==
The route of Five Creek has been obscured by the development of Rohnert Park. A 1916 United States Geological Survey topographic map shows an unnamed westward-flowing creek circling north of Wilfred like Five Creek does today. At that time, the creek's headwaters lay in the Sonoma Mountains just north of Crane Creek. The Geographic Names Information System (GNIS) gives Five Creek's source coordinates as 38.3552778°N 122.6894444°W, currently a channel on the east edge of Eagle Park. However, satellite photos show this channel connecting to Hinebaugh Creek north of San Mateo Court. A recent topographic map shows Five Creek emerging near the corner of Golf Course Drive and Country Club Drive, its former headwaters having been diverted to Crane Creek.

From Golf Course Drive, Five Creek flows northwest, paralleling Country Club Drive to Fairway Drive. It crosses the golf course, emerging near the end of Fauna Avenue. North of the city limits, it turns abruptly westward and flows under U.S. Route 101 at the Santa Rosa Avenue interchange. West of U.S. Route 101, the channel turns to the southwest, crossing under Millbrae Avenue, Whistler Avenue, Wilfred Avenue, and Rohnert Park Expressway before entering the Laguna de Santa Rosa just east of Stony Point Road.

The GNIS gives the mouth coordinates of Five Creek as 38.3499144°N 122.7322104°W. However, satellite images and United States Geological Survey topographic maps, show Hinebaugh Creek entering the Laguna at those coordinates. The Five Creek confluence lies about 0.5 mi (0.8 km) further west.

== See also ==
- Copeland Creek
- List of watercourses in the San Francisco Bay Area
