= Copeland Creek (California) =

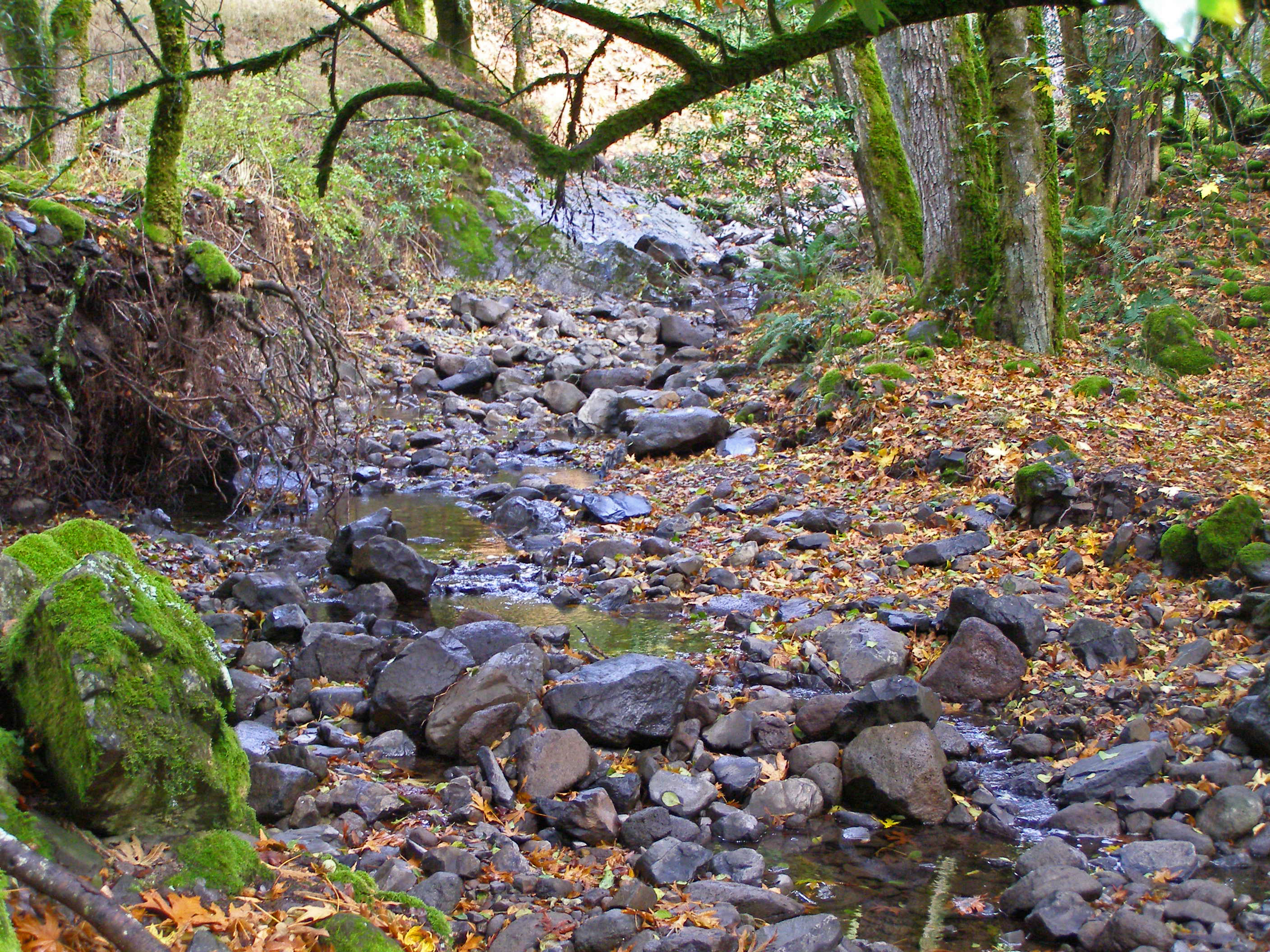
- Copeland Creek with basalt armor in channel, Fairfield Osborn Preserve

- Location of the mouth of Copeland Creek in California

Location
- Country: United States
- State: California
- Region: Sonoma County
- Cities: Penngrove, California, Rohnert Park, California

Physical characteristics
- Source
  - location: Sonoma Mountain
  - coordinates: 38°19′52″N 122°34′38″W
- Mouth: Laguna de Santa Rosa
  - location: west of Rohnert Park, California
  - coordinates: 38°20′37″N 122°43′25″W
  - elevation: 92 ft (28 m)

Copeland Creek is a 9.0-mile-long (14.5 km) perennial stream that rises on Sonoma Mountain in Sonoma County, California.

== Description ==
The headwaters area is slightly above the Fairfield Osborn Preserve, while the middle reaches drain grazing land and vineyards on the lower western slopes of the Sonoma Mountains. Upon reaching the valley floor Copeland Creek bisects the campus of Sonoma State University on its journey to discharge into the Laguna de Santa Rosa. The Copeland Creek watershed is part of the Russian River basin, which drains to the Pacific Ocean.

== History ==
The prehistory of this watershed and creek environment includes settlement by Coast Miwok, Wappo and Pomo peoples. These hunter gatherers dominated human usage until arrival of Europeans in the early 19th century. Rather swiftly an overgrazing situation arose not only in the lower reaches, but as high as the present Fairfield Osborn Preserve, which extends to elevation 1,700 feet (520 m). The upper reaches of the creek were effectively restored, following the purchase of the present lands of the Fairfield Osborn Preserve by William Matson Roth.

The lower reaches were heavily disturbed as late as the 1990s, when a restoration of the reach between Roberts Road and Petaluma Hill Road was started. These lower reaches would have been historically heavily vegetated by native alder and arroyo willow. However, cattle grazing and associated trampling of vegetation severely reduced spawning of anadromous fish: by altering stream cover that cooled water temperatures and by elevating turbidity, with resulting covering of spawning gravels. Some lower reaches between Roberts Road and the Fairfield Osborn Preserve are still subject to overgrazing as of 2006. Overgrazing has also exacerbated stream bank erosion, and led to invasive forbs and grasses supplanting the native riparian vegetation. This alteration of native riparian growth has further reduced populations of avafauna, amphibians and macro invertebrates.

== Ecology ==
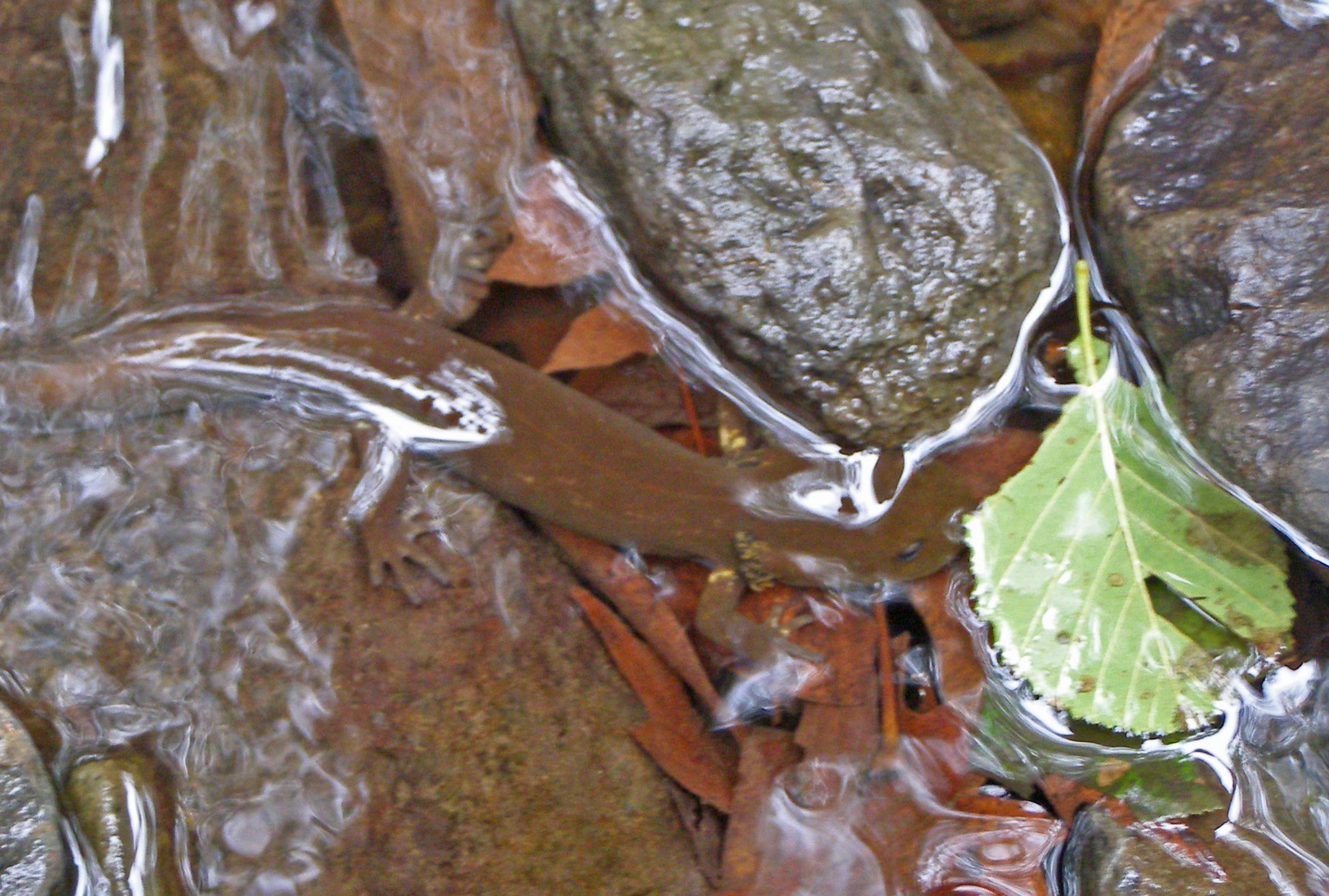
Partially submerged Pacific giant salamander larva, upper Copeland Creek.

Principal plant communities within the upper reaches include the dominant California oak woodland, and also consist of Douglas-fir woodland and riparian woodland. Within the oak woodland the main tree species are coast live oak, Oregon oak, California black oak, canyon live oak and California bay laurel. The woodland understory exhibits toyon, coffeeberry, poison oak and numerous other flowering plants such as snowberry and the uncommon American ginseng.

Upper reach wildlife includes the federally listed endangered red-legged frog. Upper reaches of Copeland Creek have a very high percentage population of California bay laurel, and also provide habitat for a rich variety of amphibians, newts and other fauna. The Pacific giant salamander, one of the largest known species of salamander is observed hunting for prey in upper Copeland Creek. Other amphibians seen in upper riparian habitats include the Pacific treefrog, Pseudacris regilla (formerly Hyla regilla), rough skinned newt, Taricha granulosa, and California slender salamander, Batrachoseps attenuatus.

== Management ==
Oversight of Copeland Creek is by the Sonoma County Water Agency; in the year 2006 the Agency cleared cattails and arroyo willow from certain lower reach portions of the creek in order to improve flow characteristics. As with any flood control management strategy, unintended environmental impacts can arise from stream channel modification. The Sonoma County General Plan Open Space Element calls for a Copeland Creek Trail along Copeland Creek to connect Rohnert Park near Sonoma State University to Crane Creek Regional Park. In addition, the 2003 County Outdoor Recreation Plan calls for a Copeland Creek Regional Park of about 500 acres (2.0 km^{2}) to be situated near Fairfield Osborn Preserve at elevation 1,500 ft (460 m). Through the city of Rohnert Park, the creek is largely channelized.

The Sonoma County Water Agency in partnership with the California Department of Fish and Game have developed a strategy for enhancing spawning capability to the Russian River and a number of its tributaries; this activity was directed at the benefit of three threatened anadromous species: Coho salmon, Chinook salmon and steelhead. A Copeland Creek Restoration Project addressed the creek channel along approximately 6,000 ft (1,800 m) of Copeland Creek, which had been overgrazed by cattle for over 100 years. Commencing in 1999, the project was implemented in four phases, the fourth and final phase of construction having been completed in the autumn of 2003. The project was designed to stabilize banks, decrease creek turbidity, exclude cattle from the creek by fencing, and improve habitat for steelhead and other native fish and wildlife. The outcome yielded a creek with less sediment load and a more natural undulation of channel, where an almost linear creek geometry had existed for the previously modified reach.

== See also ==
- Basalt
- Coho salmon
- Crane Creek
- Hinebaugh Creek
- List of watercourses in the San Francisco Bay Area
- Washoe Creek
