= Sonoma Mountains =

Mountain range in California, United States

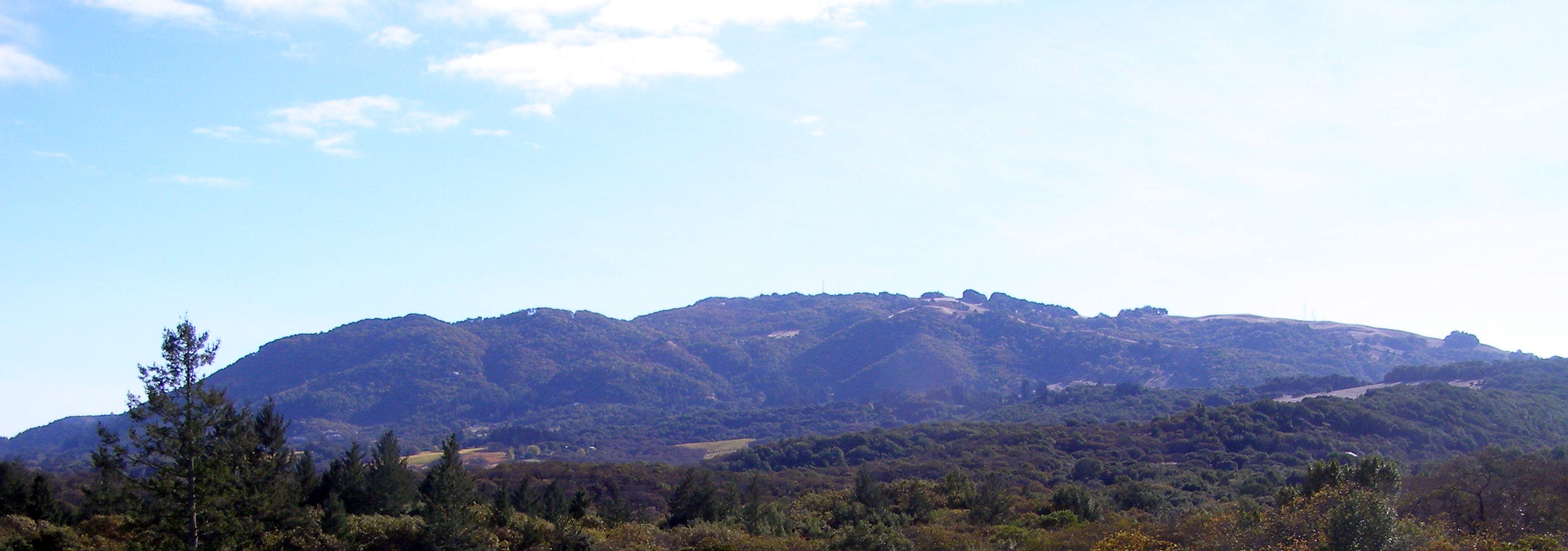
- Sonoma Mountain

Highest point
- Peak: Sonoma Mountain
- Elevation: 2,287 ft (697 m)
- Coordinates: 38°19′23″N 122°34′30″W

Dimensions
- Length: 14 mi (23 km) northwest-southeast

Geography
- Location within California
- Country: United States
- State: California
- Region: Sonoma County
- Range coordinates: 38°17′59.693″N 122°33′3.939″W
- Parent range: California Coast Ranges

The Sonoma Mountains are a northwest–southeast trending mountain range of the Inner Coast Ranges in the California Coast Ranges System, located in Sonoma County, Northern California.

== Geography ==
The Sonoma Mountains range is approximately fourteen miles (23 km) long. It separates the Sonoma Creek watershed from the Petaluma River and Tolay Creek watersheds. The highest point of this range is Sonoma Mountain, elevation 2,287 ft (697 m).

Jack London State Historic Park, Crane Creek Regional Park, and the Fairfield Osborn Preserve are all on Sonoma Mountain. A number of threatened and endangered species are found in the Sonoma Mountains including the fragrant fritillary (Fritillaria liliacea).

== Hydrology ==
Many creeks rise in the Sonoma Mountains. From the northwestern slopes, Copeland Creek and Hinebaugh Creek flow to the Laguna de Santa Rosa, eventually entering the Pacific Ocean just south of Jenner, California. Matanzas Creek and Spring Creek flow north into Santa Rosa Creek, another tributary of the Laguna.

Tributaries of Sonoma Creek rise on the eastern exposures of the Sonoma Mountains: Yulupa Creek, Carriger Creek, Graham Creek, Felder Creek, and Rogers Creek. These eventually enter San Pablo Bay south of Sonoma, California.

The southwestern slopes drain to San Pablo Bay by other routes: either Tolay Creek or else some tributary of the Petaluma River such as Lichau Creek, Lynch Creek, or Adobe Creek.

== See also ==
- Bennett Mountain
- Pomo people
- Taylor Mountain
