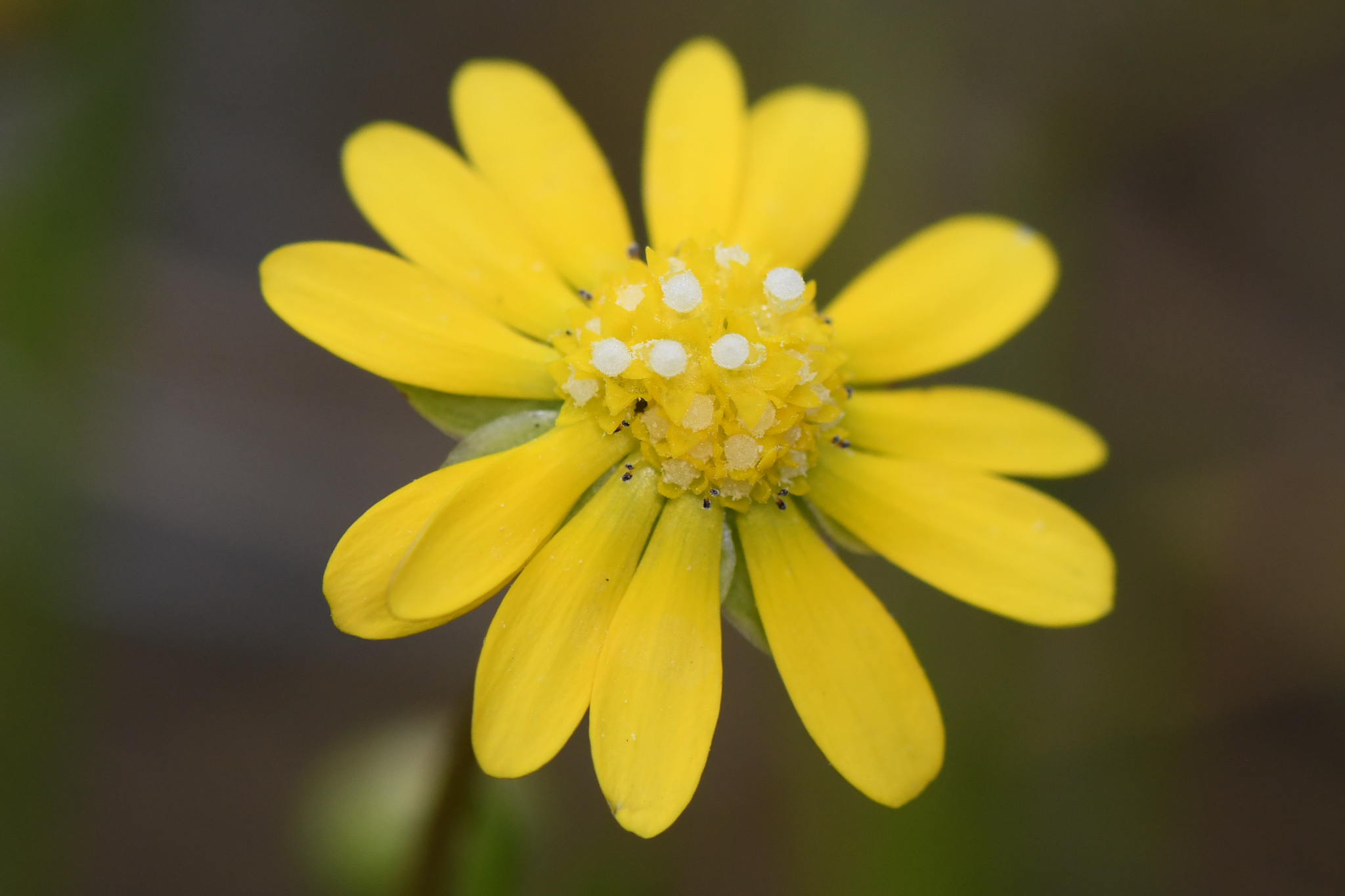

Conservation status
- Critically Imperiled (NatureServe)

Scientific classification
- Kingdom: Plantae
- Clade: Tracheophytes
- Clade: Angiosperms
- Clade: Eudicots
- Clade: Asterids
- Order: Asterales
- Family: Asteraceae
- Genus: Blennosperma
- Species: B. bakeri

Binomial name
- Blennosperma bakeri Heiser

= Blennosperma bakeri =

Species of flowering plant

Blennosperma bakeri is a rare species of flowering plant in the daisy family known by the common names Baker's stickyseed and Sonoma sunshine.

== Distribution ==
It is endemic to Sonoma County, California, where it is known from a few remaining vernal pool sites on the wet grasslands of the Laguna de Santa Rosa and Sonoma Valley. It is a federally listed endangered species. It is found alongside other rare vernal pool plants including the Sebastopol meadowfoam, Limnanthes vinculans, and Burke's goldfields, Lasthenia burkei. Threats to its survival include the alteration of its habitat for development, road maintenance, grazing, and agriculture, as well as collecting, herbivory by thrips, and invasive plants.

== Description ==
This is a small annual herb under 30 centimeters tall. The leaves are 5 to 15 centimeters long and linear in shape with lobes near the ends. The inflorescence bears a few flower heads. Each head contains a center of yellow disc florets, some of which bear prominent white stigmas and white pollen. Around the edge of the head is a fringe of yellow ray florets with red stigmas. The fruit is an achene a few millimeters long which becomes sticky when wet.

The plant is known from fifteen occurrences, but six of these may be degraded or destroyed. Several artificial vernal pools have been created to increase the numbers of the plant, but the United States Fish and Wildlife Service does not consider these an adequate replacement for natural pools.

== See also ==
- Milo Samuel Baker
