= Blucher Creek =

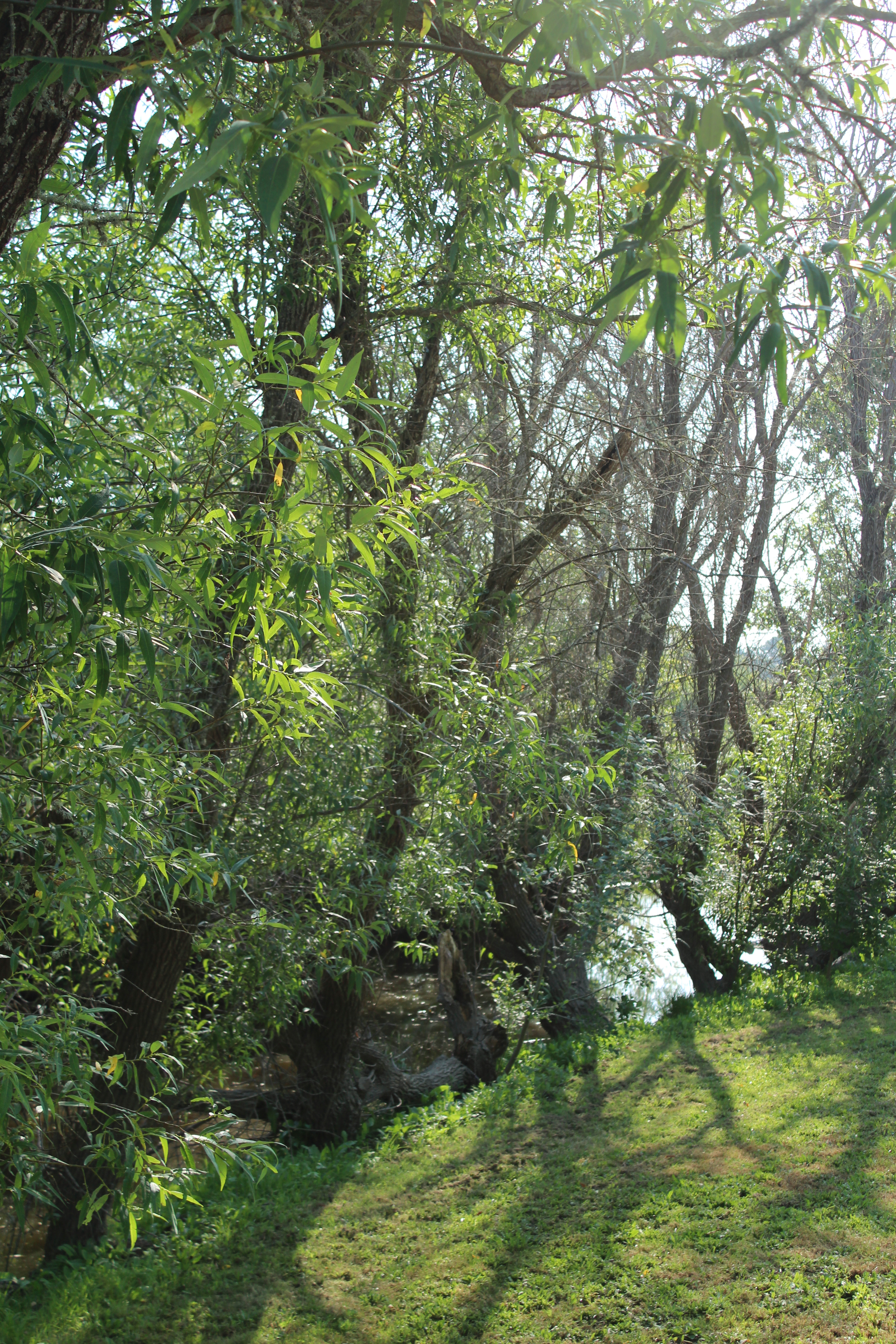
- Blucher Creek at Todd Rd. near its confluence in the Laguna de Santa Rosa
- Etymology: surname

Location
- Country: United States
- State: California
- Region: Sonoma County

Physical characteristics
- Source: English Hill
  - location: 4 mi (6 km) south of Sebastopol, California
  - coordinates: 38°20′52″N 122°50′41″W
- Mouth: Laguna de Santa Rosa
  - location: 6 mi (10 km) southwest of Santa Rosa, California
  - coordinates: 38°22′40″N 122°47′0″W
  - elevation: 71 ft (22 m)

Blucher Creek is a 5.2-mile-long (8.4 km) stream that rises in the hills south of Sebastopol, California, United States, and empties into the Laguna de Santa Rosa.

== Course ==
Blucher Creek originates on English Hill, and initially descends to the north. It soon curves eastward to parallel Blucher Valley Road. It crosses under Bloomfield Road, Canfield Road, Lone Pine Road, and Gravenstein Highway (State Route 116) to reach a confluence with the Laguna de Santa Rosa just west of Todd Road.

== See also ==
- List of watercourses in the San Francisco Bay Area

https://ecosphere-documents-production-public.s3.amazonaws.com/sams/public_docs/species_nonpublish/1828.pdf
