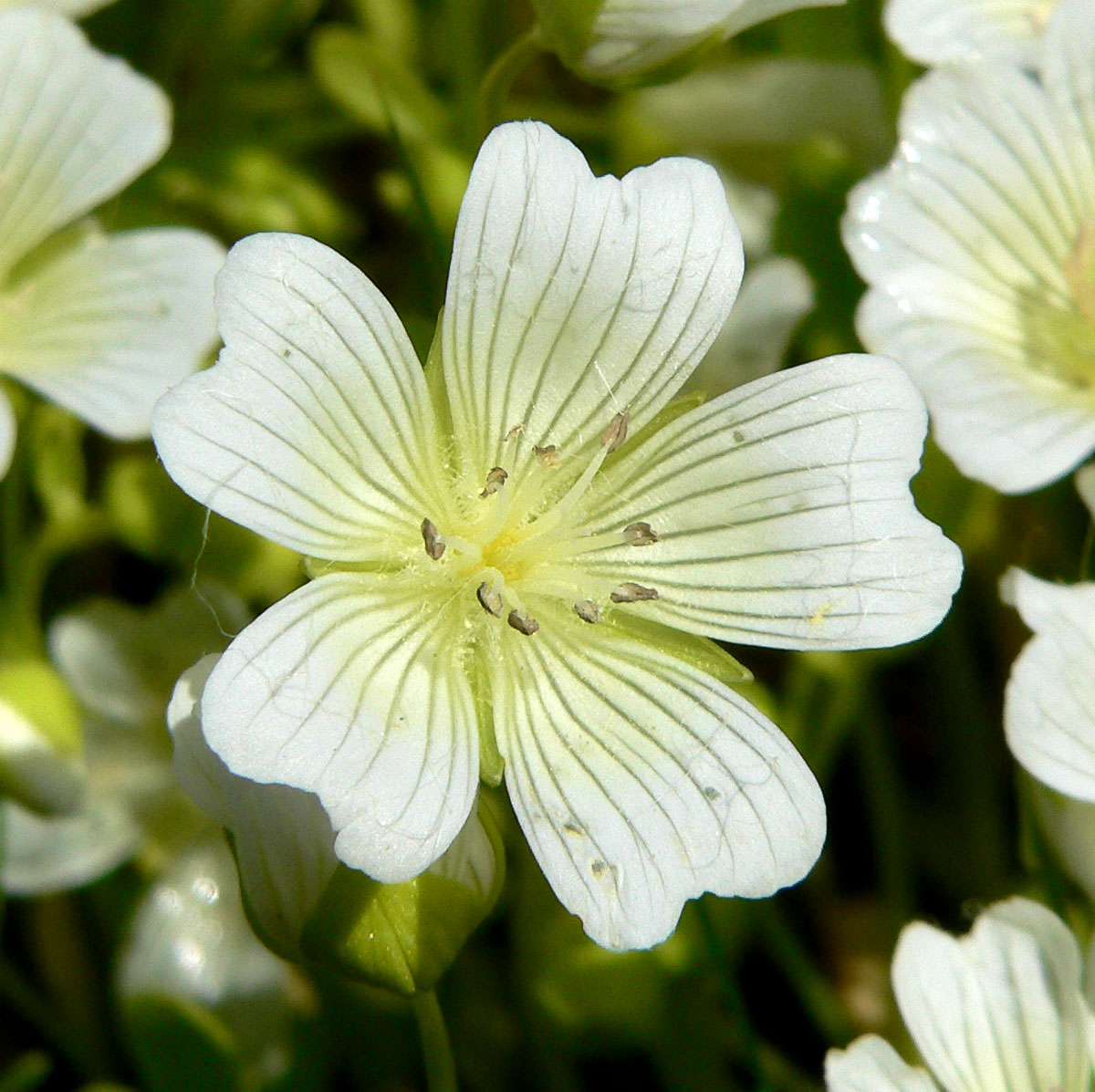

Conservation status
- Endangered (ESA)

Scientific classification
- Kingdom: Plantae
- Clade: Tracheophytes
- Clade: Angiosperms
- Clade: Eudicots
- Clade: Rosids
- Order: Brassicales
- Family: Limnanthaceae
- Genus: Limnanthes
- Section: Limnanthes sect. Limnanthes
- Species: L. vinculans

Binomial name
- Limnanthes vinculans Ornd.

= Limnanthes vinculans =

Species of flowering plant

Limnanthes vinculans, the Sebastopol meadowfoam, is an endangered species of meadowfoam found only in the Laguna de Santa Rosa in Sonoma County, California, United States and an area slightly to the south in the Americano Creek and Washoe Creek watersheds. The name vinculans derives from the Latin root vinculum, meaning "a bond, a cord." The specific epithet vinculans means linking or bonding, in reference to the sharing of some characters of L. vinculans with L. douglasii (R.Br) and L. bakeri (J.T. Howell).

== Description ==
Like the other meadowfoams, Limnanthes vinculans is a small annual herb, with multiple stems growing up to 30 centimetres (12 inches) in height; white flowers occur singly at the ends of stems. This plant bears white flowers singly at the termini of its stems. L. vinculans is unique in its genus for having compound leaves with three to five leaflets; each leaflet is entire, with a narrow-obovate shape. The flowers are small (12 to 18 millimeters across), white, generally bowl-shaped, and bloom in April and May. Although the young leaves are narrow and undivided, leaves on the mature plant have their undivided leaflets along each side of a long stalk (petiole). The shape of the leaves distinguishes Sebastopol meadowfoam from other members of the Limnanthes genus. The fruit consists of three to four millimeter long nutlets.

== Distribution and habitat ==
This species is only known from approximately 30 locations in the laguna de Santa Rosa and southern Cotati Valley of Sonoma County, in these areas it occurs in wet meadows and around vernal pools at elevations of under 300 meters. Sites range from Graton, around the northern and western perimeters of Sebastopol, and east to Santa Rosa.

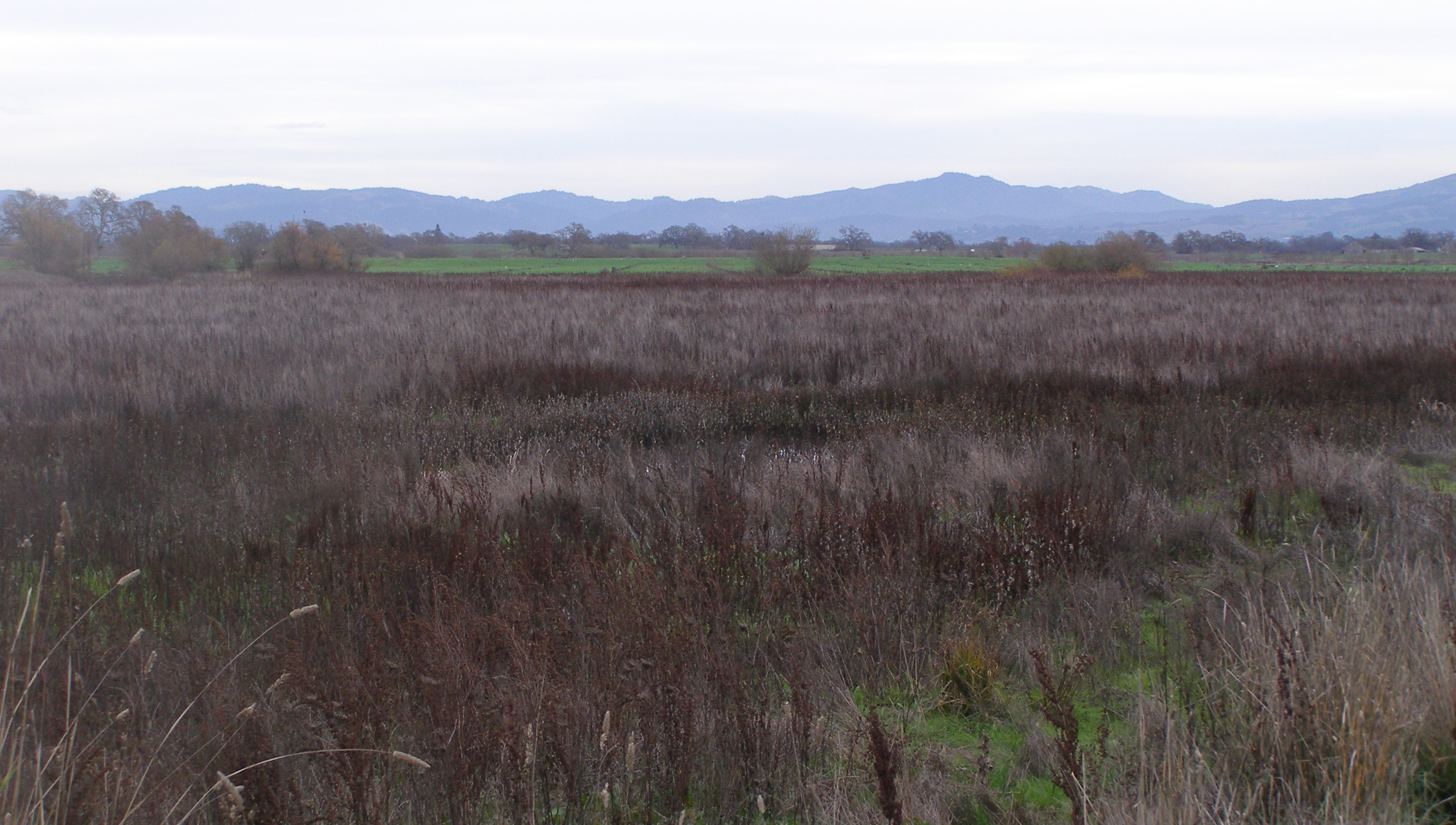
Typical habitat for L. vinculans on the Santa Rosa Plain looking east across the Laguna de Santa Rosa floodplain, with the Mayacamas Mountains in the background

Sebastopol meadowfoam is endemic to a narrow region within Sonoma County, occurring only at elevations less than 300 meters above mean sea level. The occurrences are limited to the upper and central reaches of the Laguna de Santa Rosa and parts of the Americano Creek and Washoe Creek watersheds, which drain to the Pacific Ocean. L. vinculans is found primarily in vernal pools associated with the generally level to slightly sloping terrain. Typically the herb is found in hydric soils associations, and is often found in joint occurrence with the endangered Burke's goldfields (Lasthenia burkei) and Sonoma sunshine (Blennosperma bakeri) The Santa Rosa plain vernal pools occur primarily as fragmented remains of Valley Oak Woodland, grassland, and persistent wetland vegetation.

== Conservation ==
Sebastopol meadowfoam was placed on the State of California list of endangered plants in 1979. L. Vinculans was listed as a U.S. federally endangered species on December 2, 1991. The state of California and U.S. Government are working closely with Sonoma County and the cities of Sebastopol and Santa Rosa to analyze land development proposals in areas of potential habitat, with a goal of disapproving such projects or requiring appropriate In situ or Ex-situ conservation. The primary proactive form of protection is through the regional vernal pool conservation and restoration program.

Sebastopol meadowfoam habitat is threatened by a number of human activities, particularly urbanization spreading out from nearby cities Santa Rosa, Rohnert Park and Cotati. In spring 2005, a controversy erupted when the plant was reported at the site of a proposed commercial/residential development project within the boundary of the City of Sebastopol known as Laguna Vista. State wildlife officials concluded that the meadowfoam had been deliberately transplanted from elsewhere, presumably to block the development project, and ordered the plants to be dug up. Opponents of the project disagreed and have presented testimony from experts who argue that the state used incomplete analysis to arrive at its finding. In spring 2006, the plants reappeared, although officials said they had likely sprouted from seeds scattered the previous year. Sebastopol's city council has yet to make a final decision regarding the Laguna Vista project.
