= Sonoma Mountain =

Highland in the North Bay region of California

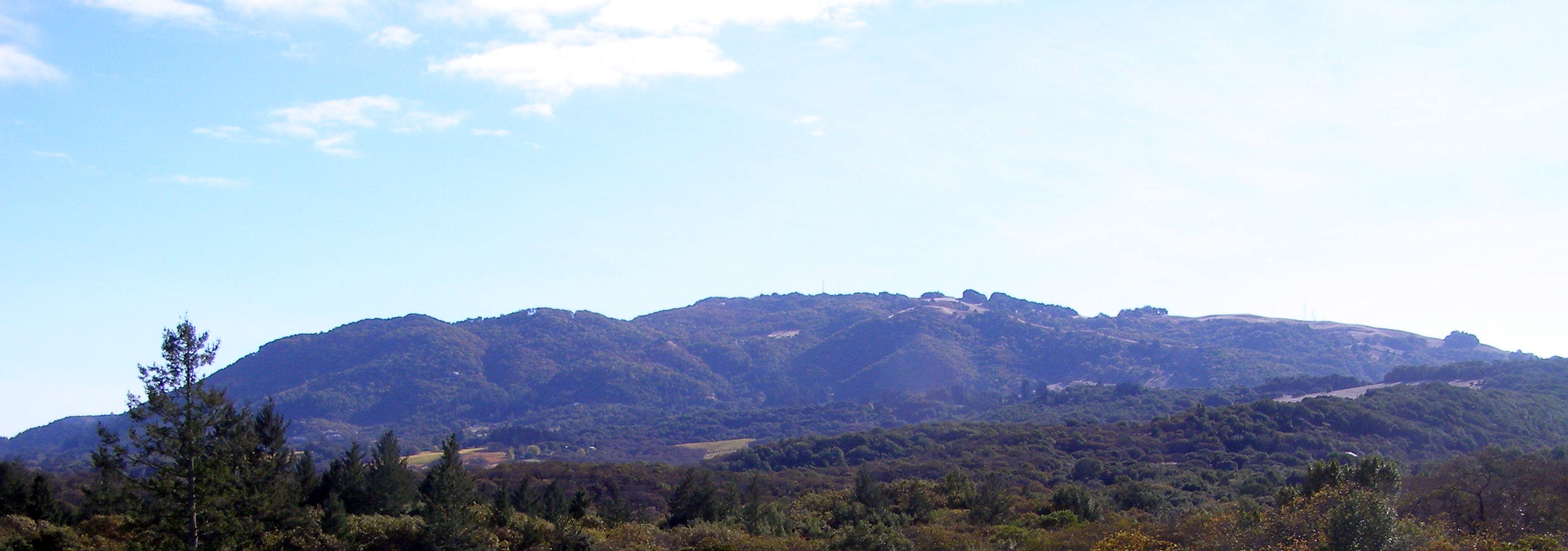
- Northeast flanks of Sonoma Mountain, viewed from Annadel State Park

Highest point
- Elevation: 2,463 ft (751 m) NAVD 88
- Coordinates: 38°19′23″N 122°34′31″W

Geography
- Location: Sonoma County, California, U.S.
- Parent range: Sonoma Mountains
- Topo map(s): USGS Glen Ellen, CA (map image)

Climbing
- Easiest route: Trail

Sonoma Mountain (Coast Miwok: Oona-pa'is) is a prominent landform within the Sonoma Mountains of southern Sonoma County, California. At an elevation of 2,463 ft (751 m), Sonoma Mountain offers expansive views of the Pacific Ocean to the west and the Sonoma Valley to the east. In fact, the viticultural area extends in isolated patches up the eastern slopes of Sonoma Mountain to almost 1,700 feet (520 m) in elevation.

The eastern and northern slopes are protected from afternoon heat and hence are more densely forested in oak woodlands, abetted by the well-drained, nutrient-rich soils. The western and southern slopes, on the other hand, are drier and warmer, leading to fewer dense woodlands and more chaparral, grassland and oak savannah.

== Geology ==
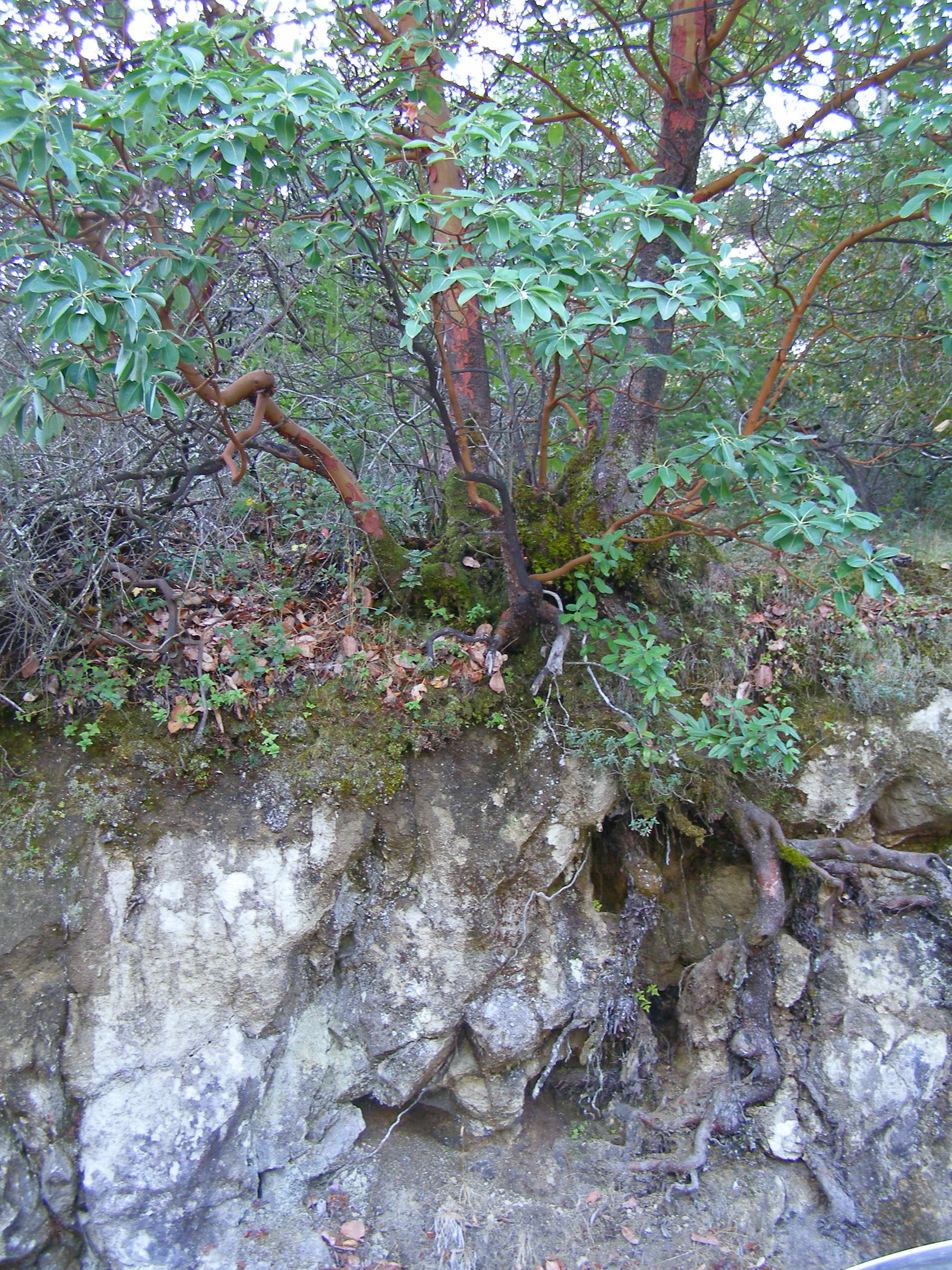
Pacific madrone growing out of bedrock on northeast slope of Sonoma Mountain

Until approximately twelve million years ago, this location was part of the seabed of the Pacific Ocean. In the Miocene era, precipitated by the combination of tectonic movement due to the seismically active environment and the presence of magma not far below the Earth's surface, a massive period of uplift ensued. This uplift formed the volcanically based Sonoma Mountains as well as the Mayacamas Mountains to the east. Residual evidence of these ancient geological features appears in the form of local hot springs such as nearby Mortons Hot Springs and Agua Caliente Hot Springs. The presence of the active Rodgers Creek Fault also attests to this prehistoric tectonic movement. The eastern slopes of Sonoma Mountain drain to Sonoma Creek, the northern flanks drain to Matanzas Creek and the southwestern flanks are in the Petaluma River watershed.

The most readily accessed eastern slopes have a predominant occurrence of Goulding clay loam soils, particularly in the immediate area of Graham Creek. These are generally areas of 15 to 30 percent slopes that support dense mixed oak woodland, with large percentages of California laurel and bigleaf maple. Higher on the eastern slopes is a large occurrence of Goulding clay loam on 30 to 50 percent slope, still with a dense forest cover, but with more Pacific madrone and coast live oak. Soil depths are rarely over a few feet deep before bedrock is reached, but even thin soils support rich plant growth because of the high nutrient content and mild climate.

The peak and higher northern slope of Sonoma Mountain consists of soils of the Goulding cobbly loam association, which are five to fifteen percent in slope and may contain up to 20 percent of cobblestones at the near surface. Outcrop of basaltic rock are common among this soil type, betraying the volcanic origin of Sonoma Mountain. The upper western reaches of Sonoma Mountain have some amounts of the Raynor clay association, which group typically has a depth to bedrock of about four to five feet. Lower on the western exposures, along the Lichau Creek immediate drainage area, there is a broad occurrence of Goulding clay loam on slopes of about 15 to 25 percent.

== Ecology ==
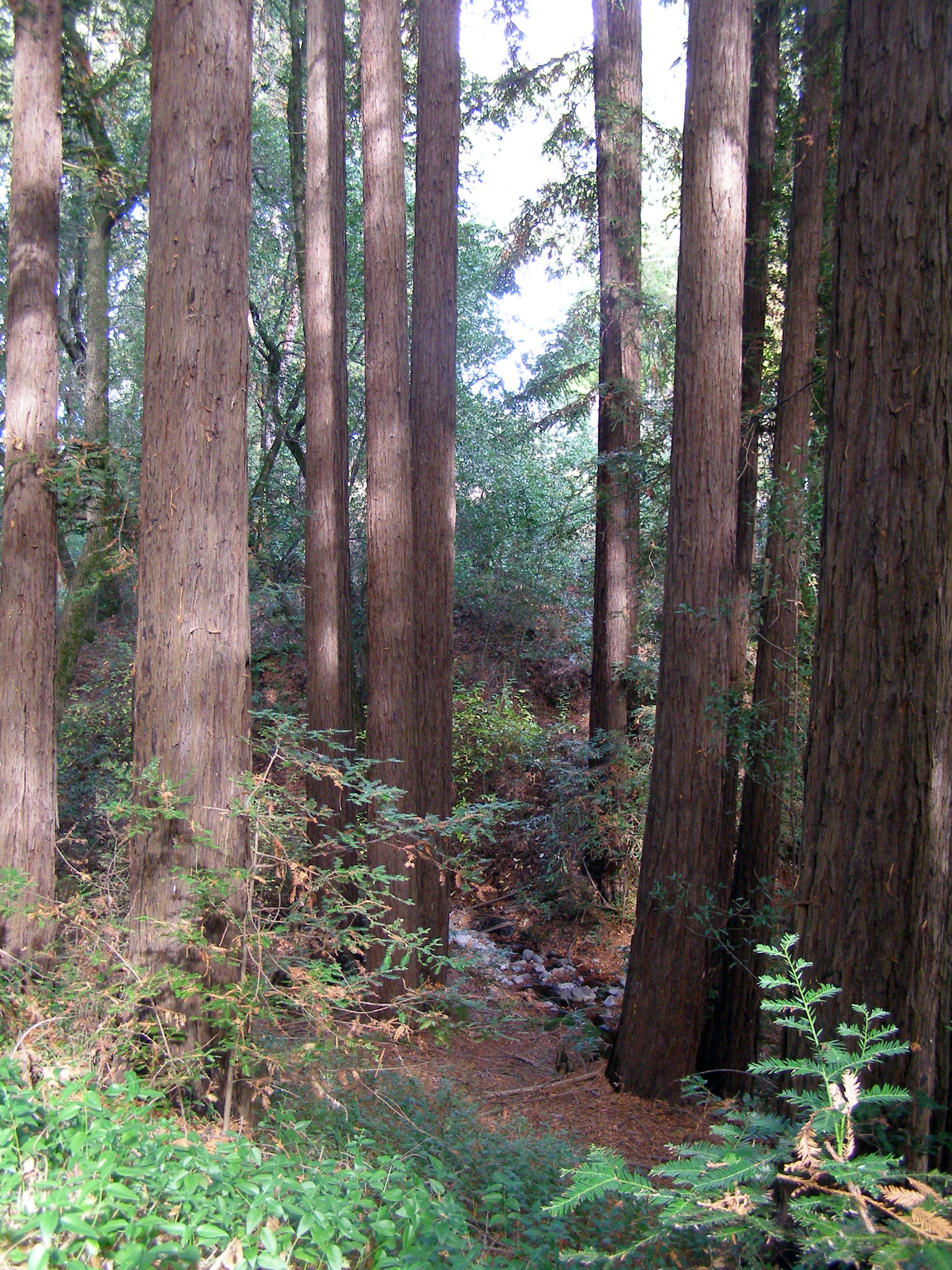
Redwood grove on north flank of Sonoma Mountain in a riparian zone

The verdant forests on eastern exposures are fed by the year-round Graham Creek and its tributaries. The most common eastern slope plant community is the oak woodland, which has a canopy of coast live oak, Garry oak, black oak, Pacific madrone, bigleaf maple and California laurel. In some of the steeper, cooler riparian zones there are also small groves of coast redwood, Sequoia sempervirens. In these oak woodlands, the dominant understory plants are toyon, blackberry, western poison-oak and in occasional drier patches some coyote brush. Common animals observed include California mule deer, gray squirrel, raccoon, skunk and opossum. Less frequently bobcat and mountain lion are seen. There is abundant birdlife including the scrub jay, Steller's jay, acorn woodpecker and junco. Because of the rich soils and mild climate, there are significant sized vineyards at elevations up to 1,700 feet (520 m) on the northeast flanks of the mountain, positioned like mosaics in a patchwork of mostly oak forest; these grapes contribute to some premium varietal wines, some of which are marketed as premium Sonoma Valley appelations.

== Jack London State Historic Park ==
Jack London State Historic Park, near Glen Ellen, is situated on the eastern slope of Sonoma Mountain. The namesake of this California State Park is author Jack London whose home, Wolf House, was located here. The building, a sizable stone structure, was destroyed by fire and its picturesque ruins are protected within the state park. Sonoma Mountain had a significant influence on Jack London and his writings. In 1910 Jack London purchased this 1,000-acre (4 km^{2}) property, known as the Beauty Ranch, for $26,000. He wrote that "Next to my wife, the ranch is the dearest thing in the world to me." He wanted the establishment to become a successful business enterprise. Writing, always a commercial enterprise with London, now became even more a means to an end: "I write for no other purpose than to add to the beauty that now belongs to me. I write a book for no other reason than to add three or four hundred acres to my magnificent estate." The sloping terrain of the park has an access trail to reach the summit of Sonoma Mountain, although the final approach to the summit and the peak itself are not within the state park property.

== North Sonoma Mountain Regional Park ==
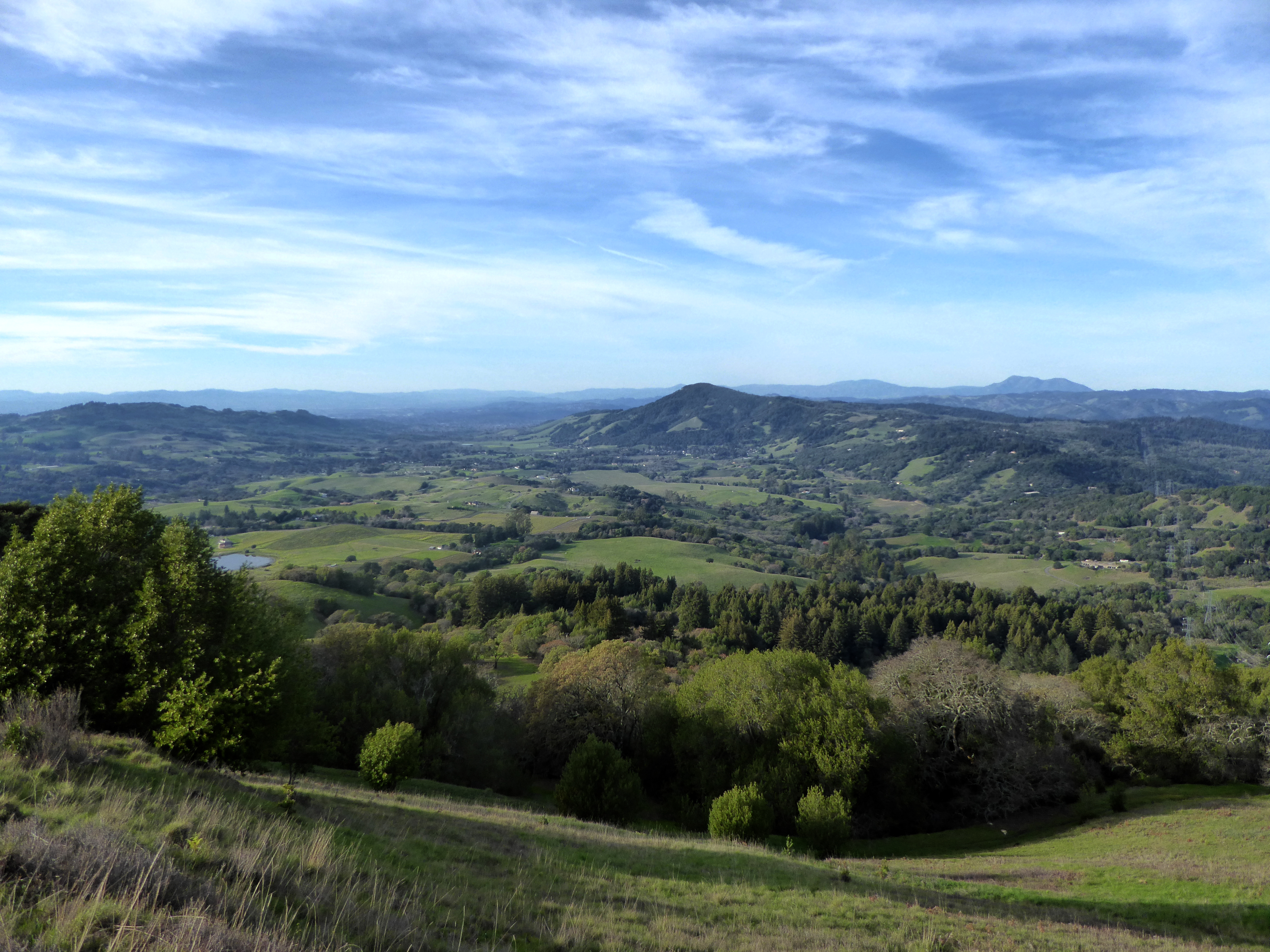
A view of Bennett Valley from North Sonoma Mountain Regional Park

The North Sonoma Mountain Regional Park and Open Space Preserve encompasses 820 acres (3.3 km^{2}) of Sonoma Mountain abutting Jack London State Historic Park. The land was purchased for public use between 2003 and 2015 by the Sonoma County Agricultural Preservation and Open Space District in cooperation with the Coastal Conservancy and Bay Area Ridge Trail Council. The park opened in February 2015 with 20 miles (32 km) of dirt trails for hikers, runners, and equestrians. The trail system connects with the Hayfields Trail in Jack London park to form an 8-mile (13 km) segment of the Bay Area Ridge Trail. Ridge trail views at 2,000 feet (610 m) in elevation include a 180-degree panorama of the Sonoma Valley and the Santa Rosa plain. Some viewpoints have picnic tables. Some trails are closed to mountain bikes, and dogs are not allowed in the park. Park access is through the former Jacobs Ranch at 5297 Sonoma Mountain Road, approximately 3 miles (4.8 km) from Bennett Valley Road. The park is open from 7 AM to sunset, with a $7.00 parking fee for those without Regional Parks membership. There is a bathroom at the parking lot, but no drinking water is available. There is a wheelchair-accessible trail from the parking lot to picnic tables in a shaded grove on Matanzas Creek.

== Fairfield Osborn Preserve ==
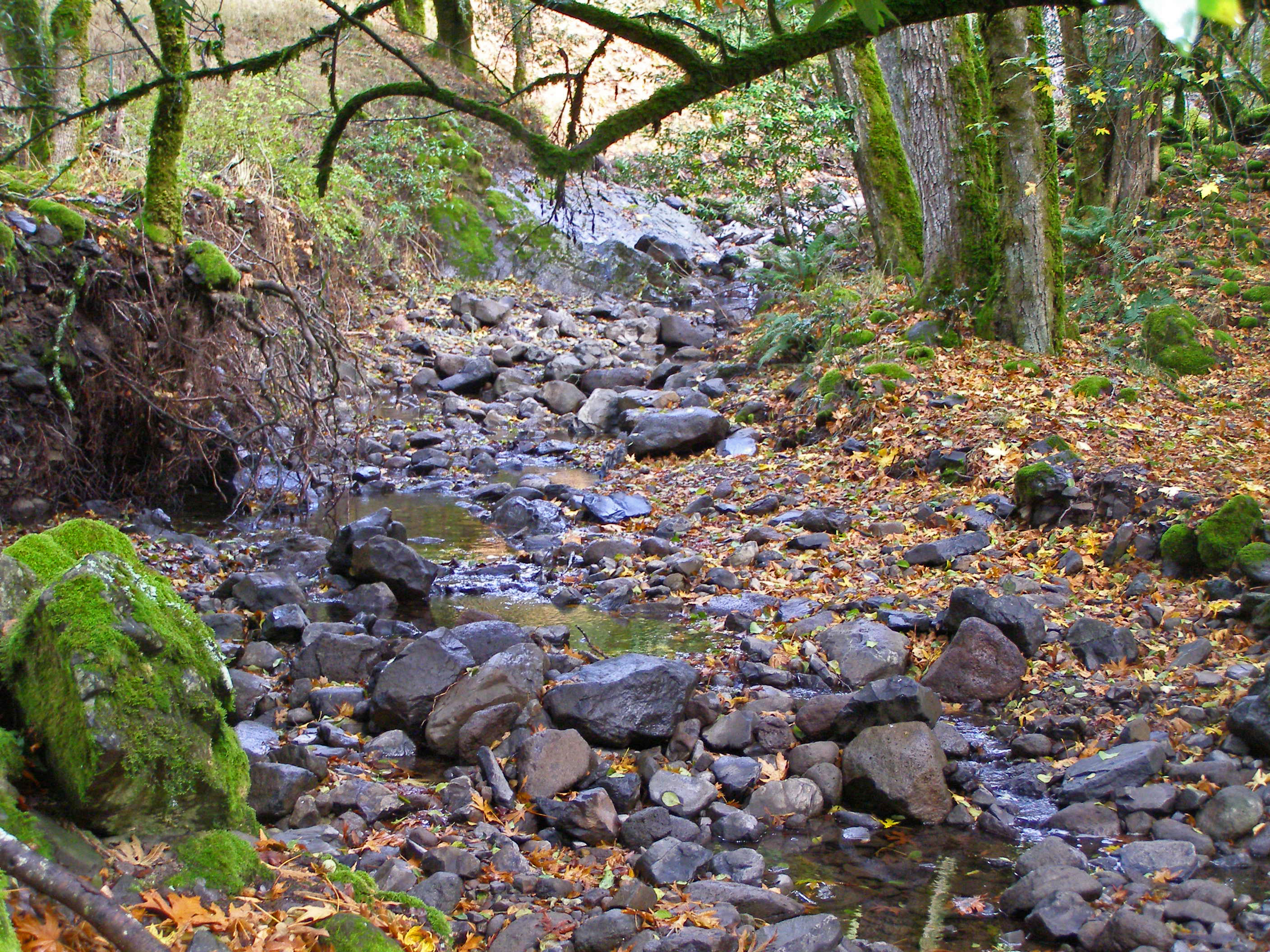
Copeland Creek with basalt armor in channel, Fairfield Osborn Preserve

The Fairfield Osborn Preserve is a 460-acre (1.9 km^{2}) nature reserve situated on the northwest flank of Sonoma Mountain in Sonoma County, California. There are several plant communities within the property, oak woodland being the dominant type. Other habitats include chaparral, native clump grassland, marsh, coastal scrub and riparian zone. A diverse fauna inhabits this area including black-tailed deer, coyote, bobcat and mountain lion; moreover, there are abundant avifauna, amphibians, reptiles and insects. The flora are extremely diverse including many native trees, shrubs, grasses, lichens, and mosses. Copeland Creek and its tributaries drain the preserve as they wend their way down steep ravines toward eventual discharge to the Laguna de Santa Rosa. The property was originally a Spanish Land Grant holding and is now owned and managed by Sonoma State University, which uses it as a research base and as an educational tool for the general public. An understated natural trail system weaves through the property to provide access to creek canyons, ridges and marshy areas. The preserve is situated at elevations between 1,600 and 1,900 feet (490 and 580 m) above sea level and features a landscape riddled with basalt exposures that betray the volcanic prehistory of Sonoma Mountain.

== Viticulture ==
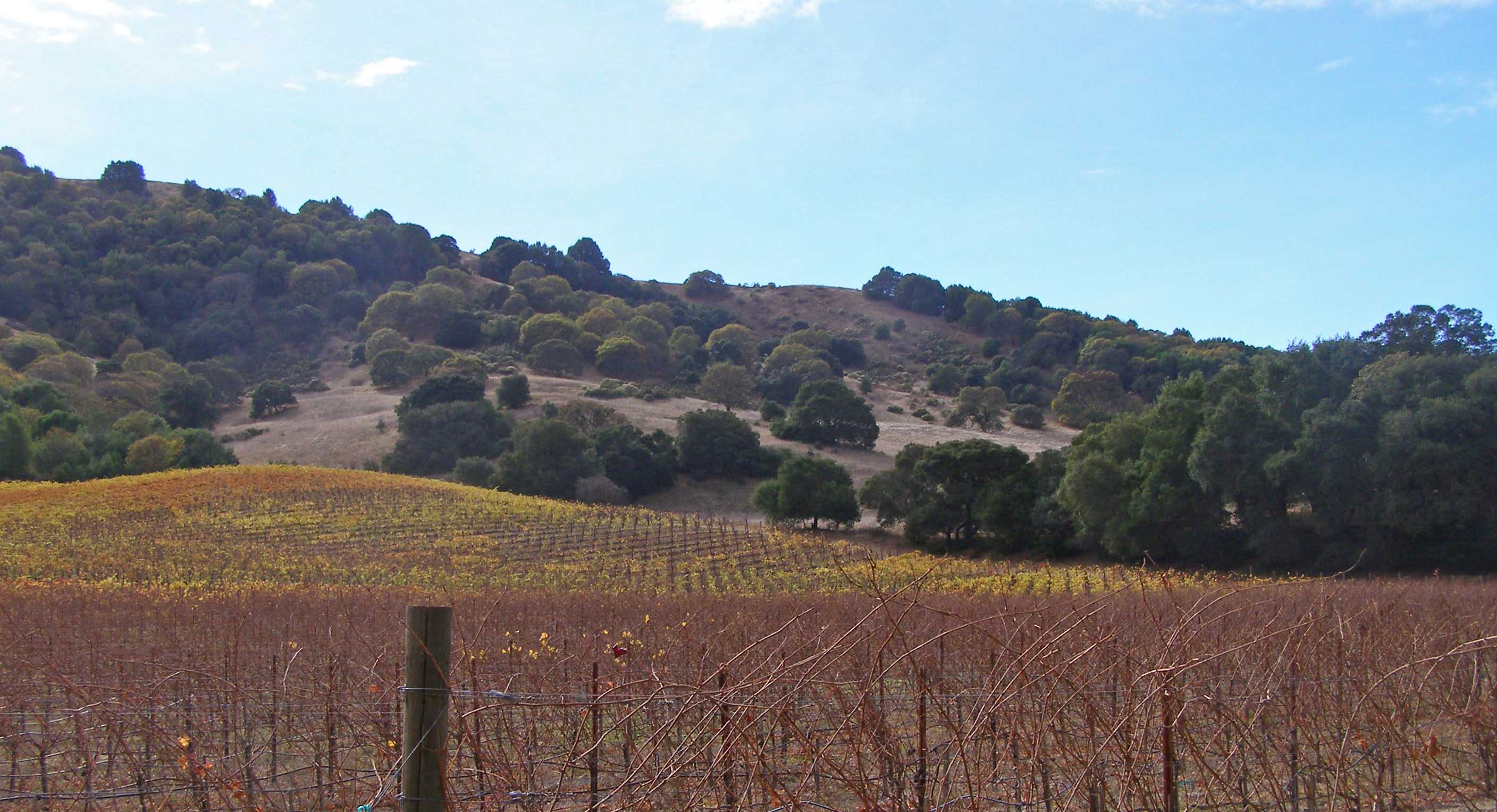
Vineyard on northwest flank of Sonoma Mountain

Sonoma Mountain's name was designated to the Sonoma Mountain viticultural area on January 23, 1985 by the Bureau of Alcohol, Tobacco and Firearms (ATF), Treasury after reviewing the petition submitted by Mr. David Steiner, a local grape grower, on behalf of himself and area viticulturists, proposing a new viticultural area in Sonoma County known as "Sonoma Mountain."

The peak of Sonoma Mountain also defines the northwesterly boundary of the adjacent wine region Sonoma Coast AVA, established in 1987. Winegrapes grown on its western and southern slopes are designated from the Sonoma Coast appellation, but the winegrapes cultivated on its eastern and northern slopes are sourced as Sonoma Mountain or Sonoma County appellations.

== Broadcasting ==
The TV broadcast antenna for KRCB was located on Sonoma Mountain from the station's start-up in 1984 until it moved to Sutro Tower in San Francisco in 2019.

== See also ==
- California Wine Country
- List of summits of the San Francisco Bay Area
- Pomo people
- Coast Miwok people
- Sonoma Mountain Zen Center
- Taylor Mountain
