= Hinebaugh Creek =

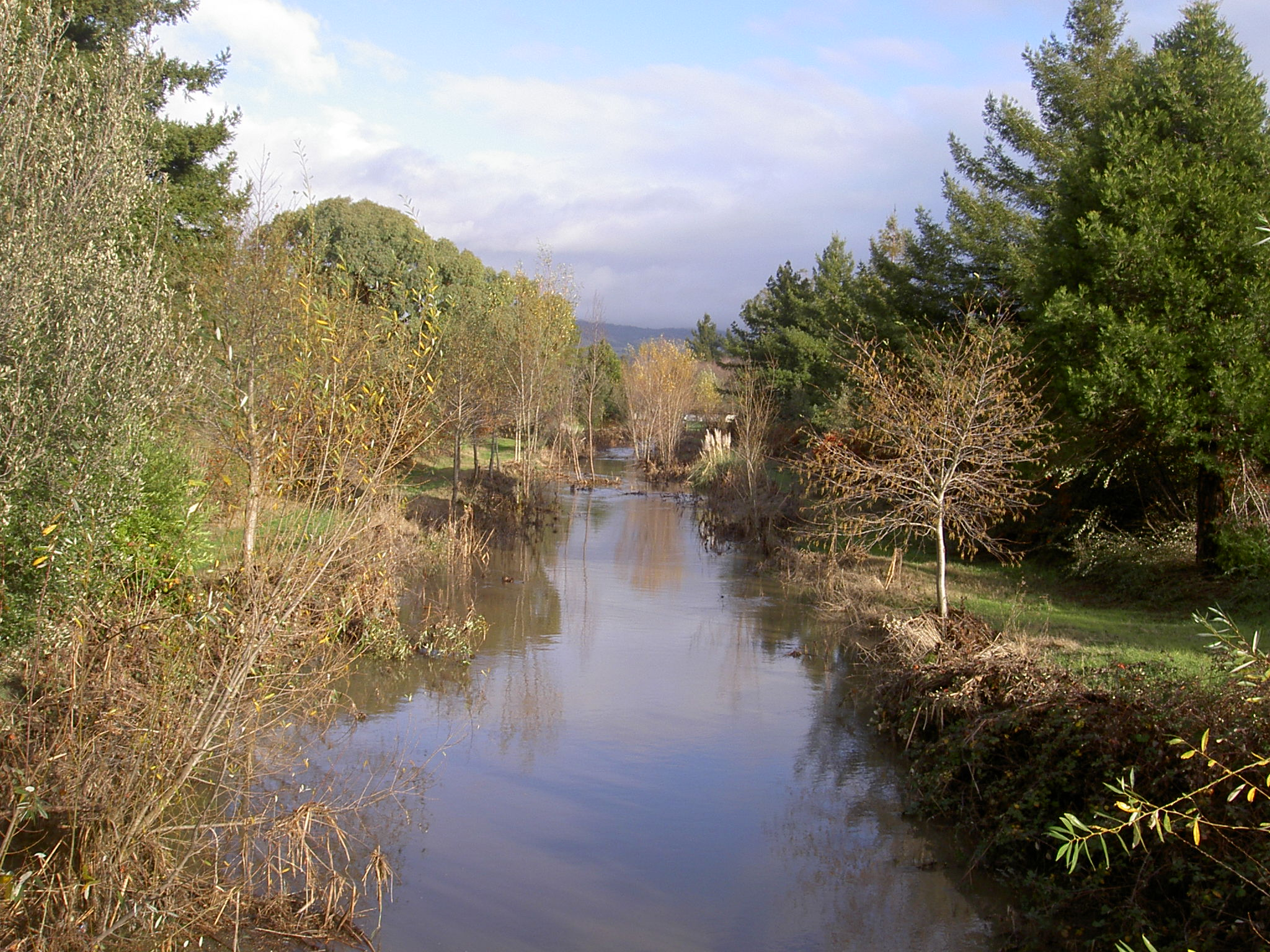
- Hinebaugh Creek after a storm

- Location of the mouth of Hinebaugh Creek in California

Location
- Country: United States
- State: California
- Region: Sonoma County
- City: Rohnert Park, California

Physical characteristics
- Source
  - location: east of Rohnert Park, California
- Mouth: Laguna de Santa Rosa
  - location: west of Rohnert Park, California
  - coordinates: 38°21′0″N 122°43′56″W
  - elevation: 85 ft (26 m)

Basin features
- Tributaries
  - right: Crane Creek

Hinebaugh Creek (Latitude: 38.35; Longitude:-122.73) is a westward-flowing stream in western Sonoma County within the Laguna de Santa Rosa watershed. As this watercourse proceeds westerly through the city of Rohnert Park, it has largely been channelized and courses in an artificially straight alignment. Considered waters of the United States as a jurisdictional matter, Hinebaugh Creek is potential habitat for the California red-legged frog and the Western pond turtle. The dominant riparian vegetation is Himalayan blackberry and willow.

== See also ==
- Copeland Creek
- Crane Creek
- Fairfield Osborn Preserve
- Five Creek
- List of watercourses in the San Francisco Bay Area
