= Washoe Creek =

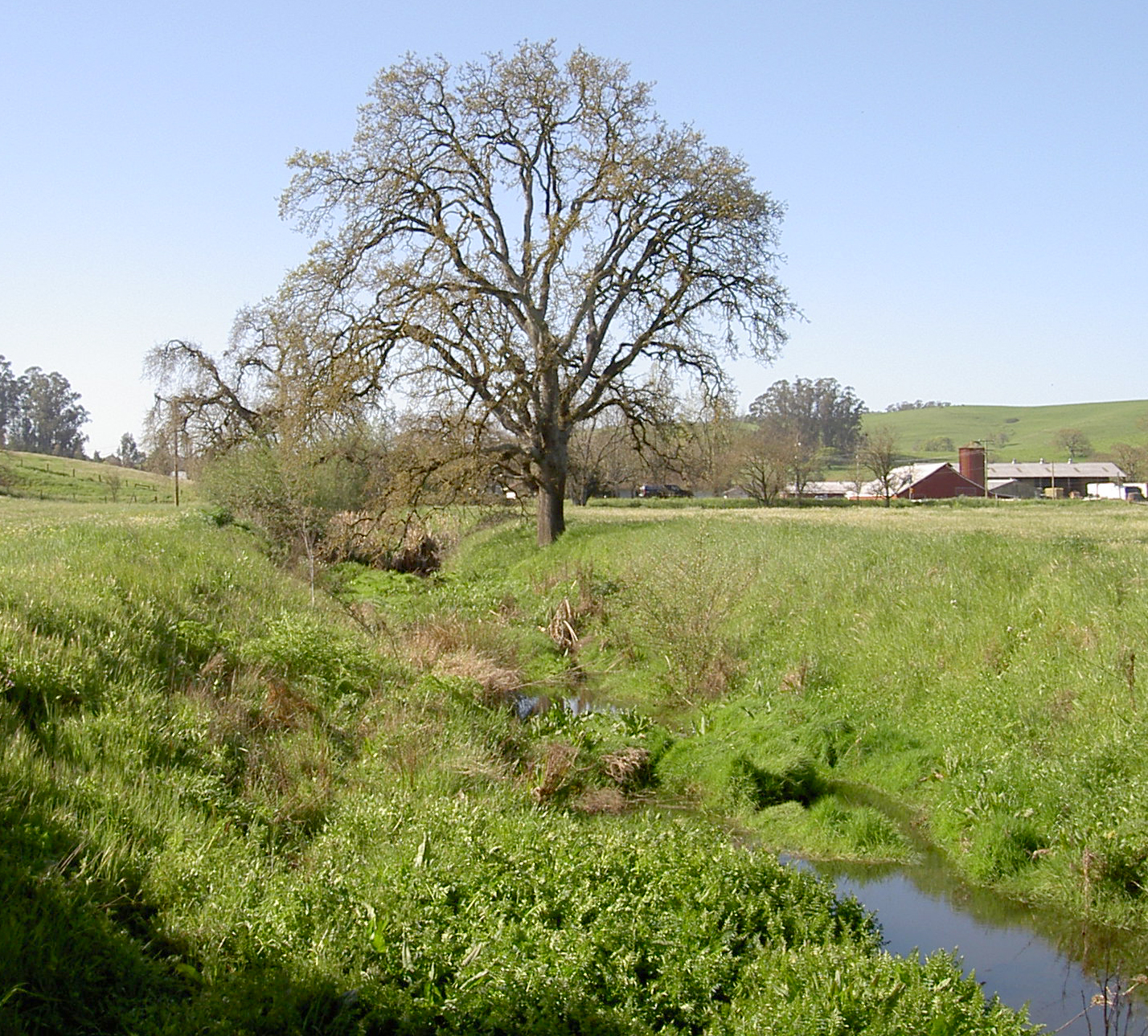
- Channelized lower reaches of Washoe Creek, in spring.

- Location of the mouth of Washoe Creek in California
- Etymology: Washo language

Location
- Country: United States
- State: California
- Region: Sonoma County
- City: Cotati

Physical characteristics
- Source
  - location: 3 mi (5 km) southwest of Cotati, California
  - coordinates: 38°18′25″N 122°44′58″W
  - elevation: 400 ft (120 m)
- Mouth: Laguna de Santa Rosa
  - location: west of Rohnert Park, California
  - coordinates: 38°21′0″N 122°43′59″W
  - elevation: 85 ft (26 m)
- Length: 2 mi (3.2 km)

Basin features
- Tributaries
  - left: Gossage Creek

Washoe Creek is a perennial stream located in Sonoma County, California. It is about 2 mi (3 km) long and discharges to the Laguna de Santa Rosa.

Washoe Creek rises in the low lying Meacham Hills southwest of the city of Cotati. It descends to the northeast, flowing under Roblar Road and Stony Point Road. It then turns northward and parallels Stony Point Road, crossing under West Sierra Avenue and Madrone Avenue. Gravenstein Highway (State Route 116) crosses the creek, which then enters an artificial channel. Gossage Creek enters from the west, and shortly thereafter the creek ends at a confluence with the Laguna de Santa Rosa just west of Rohnert Park.

The original native riparian vegetation was likely riparian woodland, with Valley Oak savanna and grassland on the upland east and west. The native habitats have been largely altered or replaced, due to the modern uses of grazing, agriculture, and urban development. In stream nitrate concentrations are noticeably higher for Washoe Creek than other watercourses within the Laguna de Santa Rosa watershed. The lower reach is under consideration for a restoration project.

== History ==
This area was settled at least as early as 2000 BC by the Coast Miwok peoples, who built small villages along the banks of Washoe Creek and other local watercourses. These early peoples were gatherers and utilized resources of the creek as well as upland areas for subsistence. In 1833 this entire area around present Cotati was part of a Mexican land grant.

One of the area's American pioneers was Robert Ayres, who in 1859 built Washoe House near the creek's headwaters.

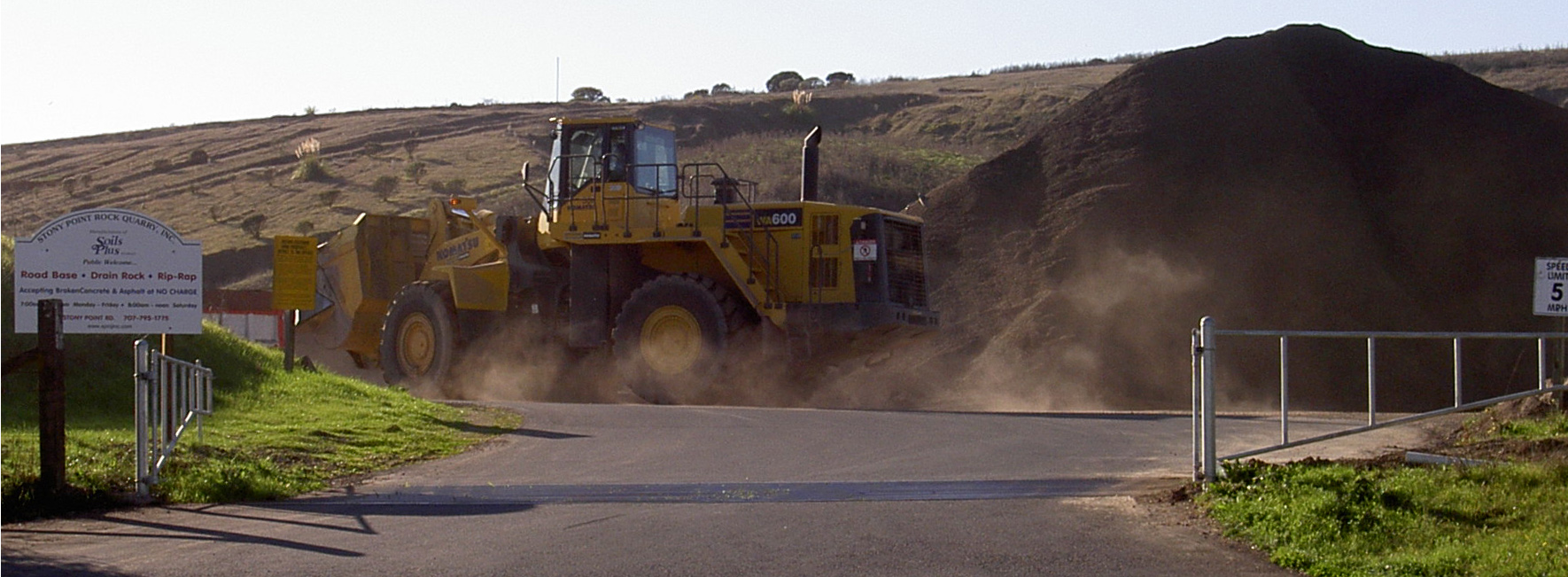
Entrance to Stony Point Rock Quarry

In the early 1900s, a rock quarry on Petersen Road (Gossage Creek watershed) was abandoned, and a new quarry was begun on Stony Point Road. The creek lies just across Stony Point Road from the current quarry site.

== See also ==
- Limnanthes vinculans
- List of watercourses in the San Francisco Bay Area
- Quarry
- Riparian zone
