= Crane Creek Regional Park =

Regional park of Sonoma County, California

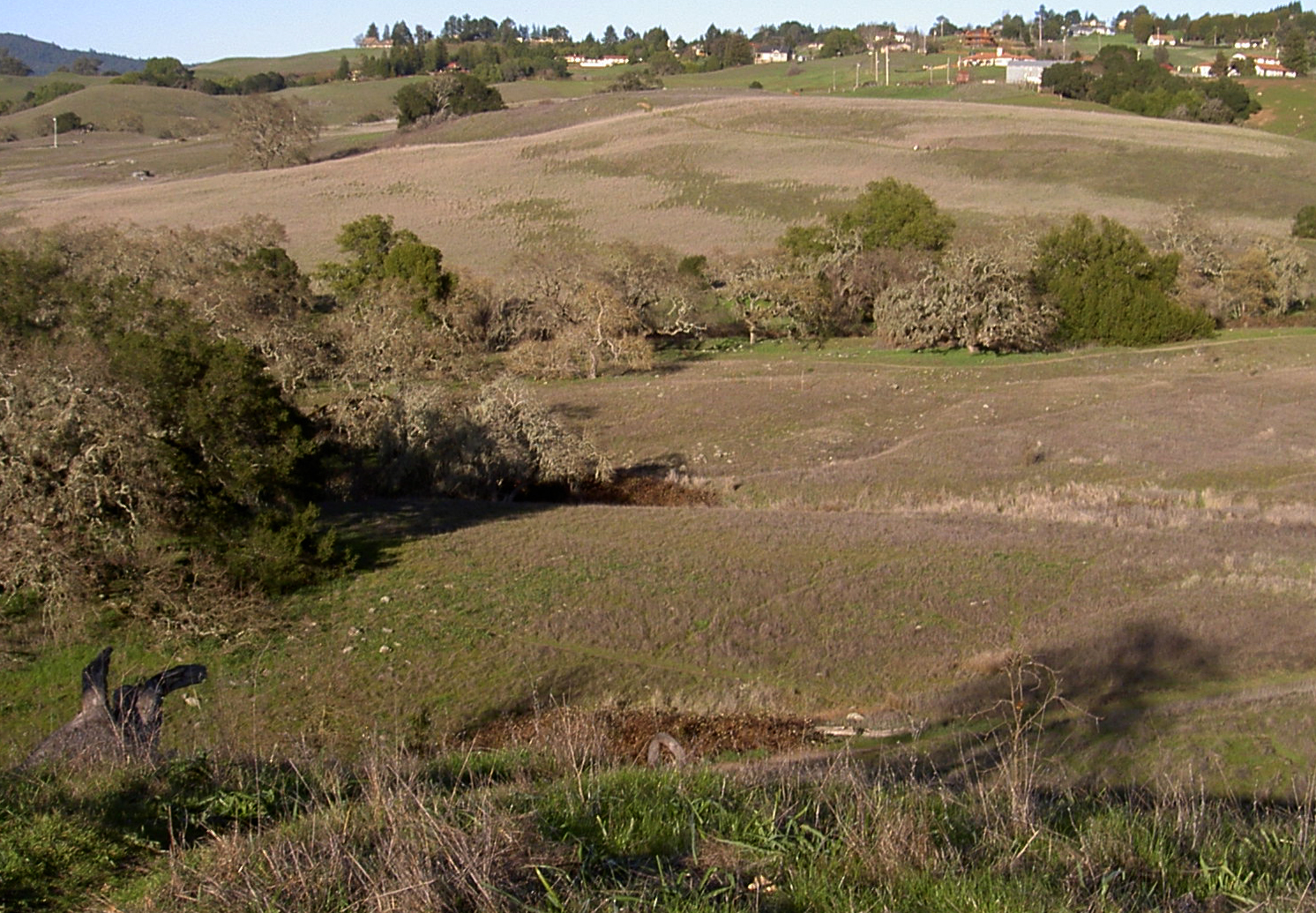
- View of meadow and creek at Crane Creek Regional Park

- Location within California
- /2/queryThe property query is required; /2/idsThe property ids is required; /2Failed to match at least one schema; /2/titleThe property title is required; /2/serviceThe property service is required; /2Failed to match exactly one schema; /2/typeDoes not have a value in the enumeration ["ExternalData"]; /2/properties/marker-colorDoes not match the regex pattern ^#?([0-9a-fA-F]{3}){1,2}$; /2/geometriesThe property geometries is required; /2/typeDoes not have a value in the enumeration ["GeometryCollection"]; /2/typeDoes not have a value in the enumeration ["MultiPolygon"]; /2/typeDoes not have a value in the enumeration ["Point"]; /2/typeDoes not have a value in the enumeration ["MultiPoint"]; /2/typeDoes not have a value in the enumeration ["LineString"]; /2/typeDoes not have a value in the enumeration ["MultiLineString"]; /2/typeDoes not have a value in the enumeration ["Polygon"]; /2/coordinatesThe property coordinates is required; /2/featuresThe property features is required; /2/typeDoes not have a value in the enumeration ["FeatureCollection"]; Interactive map of Crane Creek Regional Park
- Type: Regional park
- Location: Rohnert Park, California, U.S.
- Nearest city: Rohnert Park, California
- Coordinates: 38.346°N 122.645°W
- Area: 128 acres (52 ha)
- Opened: 1975
- Etymology: Named after Robert Crane
- Operator: Sonoma County Regional Parks Department
- Open: Year-round
- Status: Open
- Hiking trails: Creek Trail, Hawk Ridge Trail, Lupine Trail, Poppy Trail, Sunset Trail
- Terrain: Meadow and creek
- Water: Crane Creek
- Plants: Wildflowers (meadow flora)
- Facilities: Picnic tables, unpaved trails
- Website: Official website

Crane Creek Regional Park is a regional park east of Rohnert Park, California, U.S.A. which is maintained by the Sonoma County Regional Parks Department. It covers an area of 128 acres (52 ha) at. The park entrance is at 6107 Pressley Road.

== Facilities and features ==
The park features numerous unpaved trails suitable for hiking, including:

- Creek Trail
- Hawk Ridge Trail
- Lupine Trail
- Poppy Trail
- Sunset Trail

There is also a loop trail (Fiddleneck Trail, Buckeye Trail, Northern Look Trail) suitable for bicycling or horseback riding. There are picnic tables and latrines near the parking area. Crane Creek flows through the park from southeast to northwest.

== History ==
The land, originally homesteaded by Robert Crane in 1852, was purchased by the county in 1975 using grant money from Land and Water Conservation Funds. A botanical study performed in 1991 found significant damage to the wildflower meadows. This finding resulted in the exclusion of bicycles and horses from the meadow areas.

== See also ==
- Crane Creek
