= Fairfield Osborn Preserve =

Nature reserve in California

Coordinates: 38.34338°N 122.59479°W

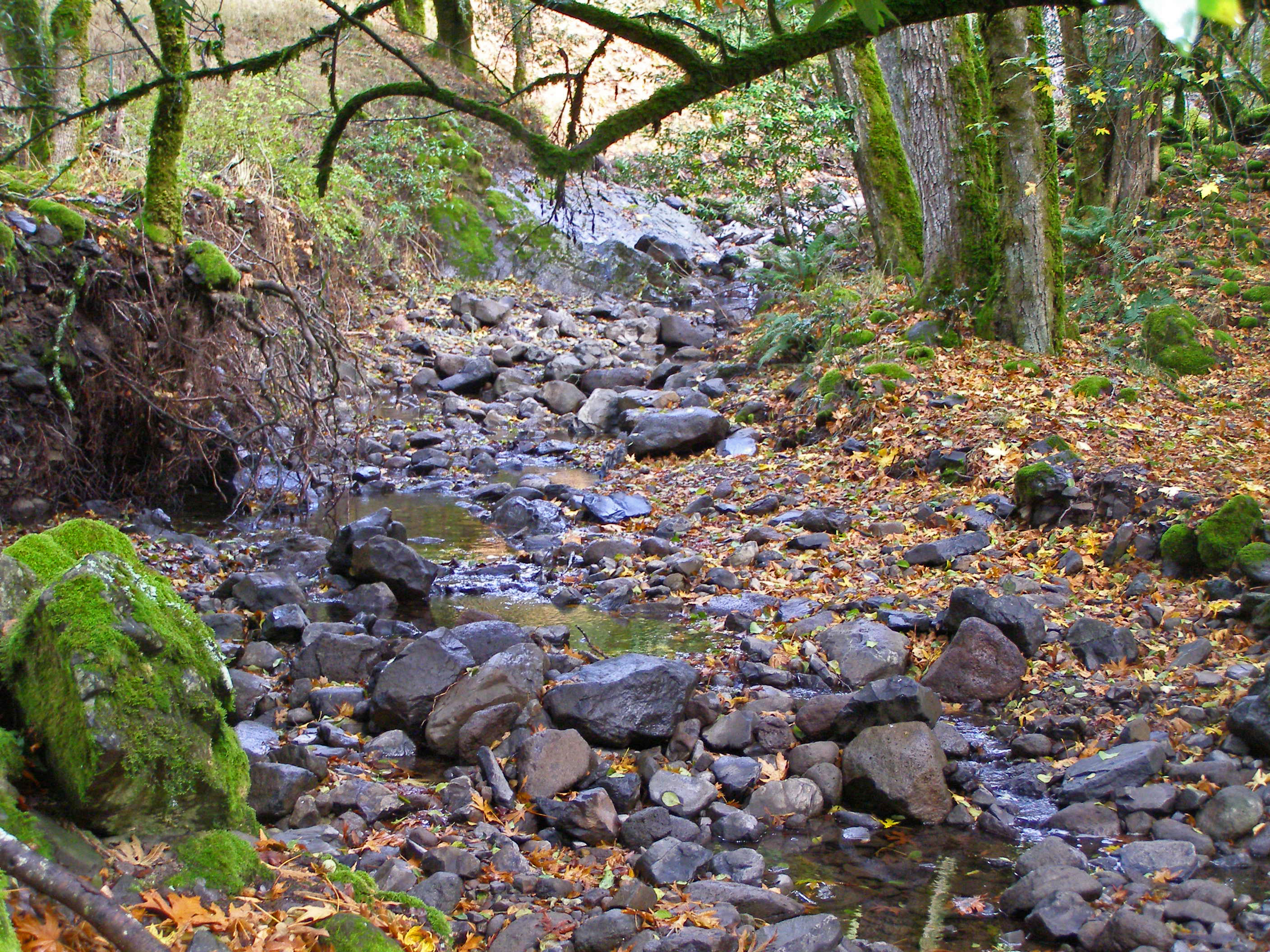
- Copeland Creek with basalt armor in channel, Fairfield Osborn Preserve
- Interactive map of Fairfield Osborn Preserve
- Location: Sonoma Mountain, Sonoma County, California, United States
- Area: 450 acres (180 ha)
- Elevation: 411 to 701 meters above sea level
- Established: 1972
- Governing body: Sonoma State University

The Fairfield Osborn Preserve is a 450-acre nature reserve situated on the northwest flank of Sonoma Mountain in Sonoma County, California. There are eight plant communities within the property, oak woodland being the dominant type. Other communities include chaparral, Douglas fir woodland, native Bunch grass, freshwater marsh, vernal pool, pond and riparian woodland. The flora is extremely diverse including many native trees, shrubs, wildflowers, grasses, lichens and mosses. A diverse fauna inhabits this area including black-tailed deer, coyote, bobcat and an occasional mountain lion; moreover, there are abundant avifauna (including some neotropical migrants), amphibians, reptiles and insects.

Copeland Creek and its tributaries drain the Preserve as they wend their way down steep ravines toward eventual discharge to the Laguna de Santa Rosa. The property was originally a Spanish Land Grant holding, devolving to private ownership and eventually given to The Nature Conservancy; the preserve is now owned and managed by Sonoma State University as a research and education site. An understated natural trail system weaves through the property to provide access to creek canyons, ridges and marshy areas. The preserve is situated at elevations 1,350 to 2,300 feet (411 to 701 meters) above sea level and features a landscape riddled with basalt exposures that betray the volcanic prehistory of Sonoma County. The climate at the Preserve is mild, with most rainfall occurring in the winter months and with some influence of the Pacific Ocean providing moderating temperatures and some marine fog on early summer mornings.

== Soils ==
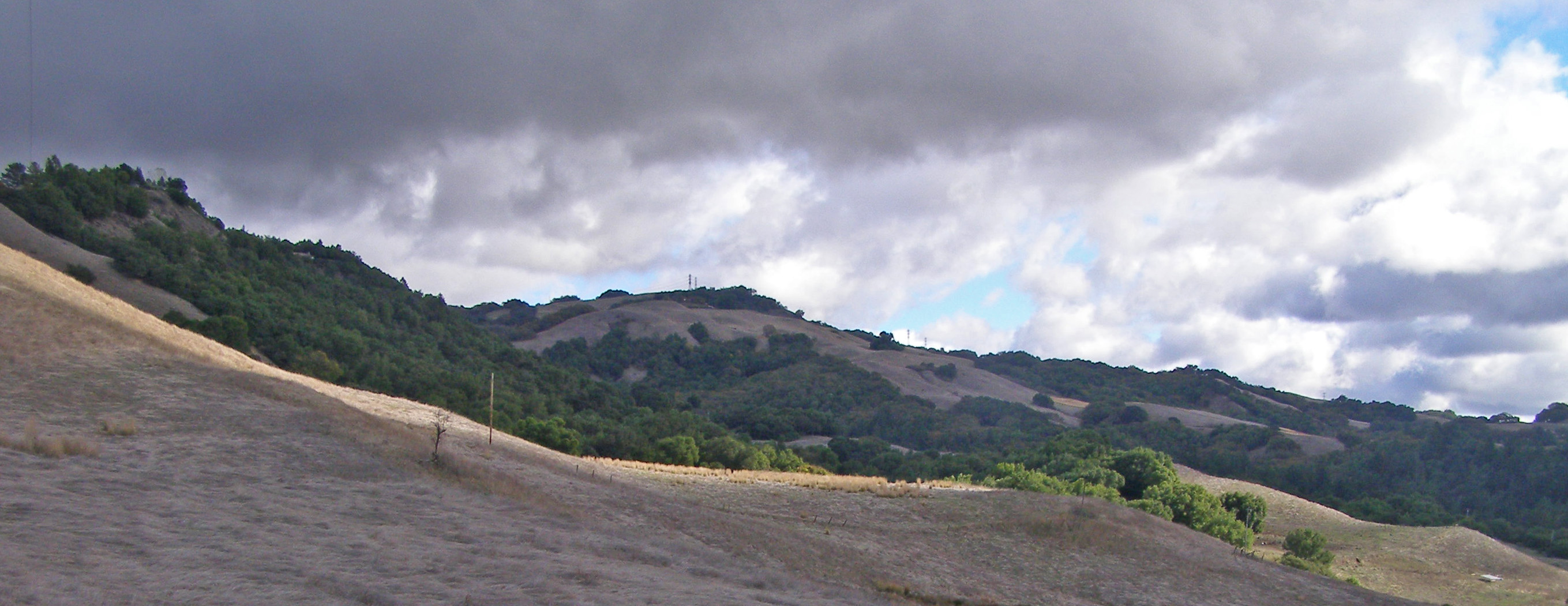
Northwest flank of Sonoma Mountain with Fairfield Osborn Preserve at upper left of image

The steep slopes of Copeland Creek have a predominant occurrence of Goulding clay loam soils, with a typical soil depth of only 16 to 20 inches (41 to 51 centimeters). These are generally areas of 15 to 45 percent slopes that support dense mixed oak woodland, with large percentages of California laurel and Bigleaf maple. On the higher drier slopes, there are terraces of Raynor clay, which are associated with seeps and higher moisture retention known to the Turtle Pond and Cattail Marsh areas of the Preserve. Both soil types are known to support grazing when woodlands are cleared. In the late 19th century, the site was used for sheep and cattle grazing and the woodlands were cut for firewood, which was taken by wagonload down the mountain to Petaluma.

== Hydrology ==
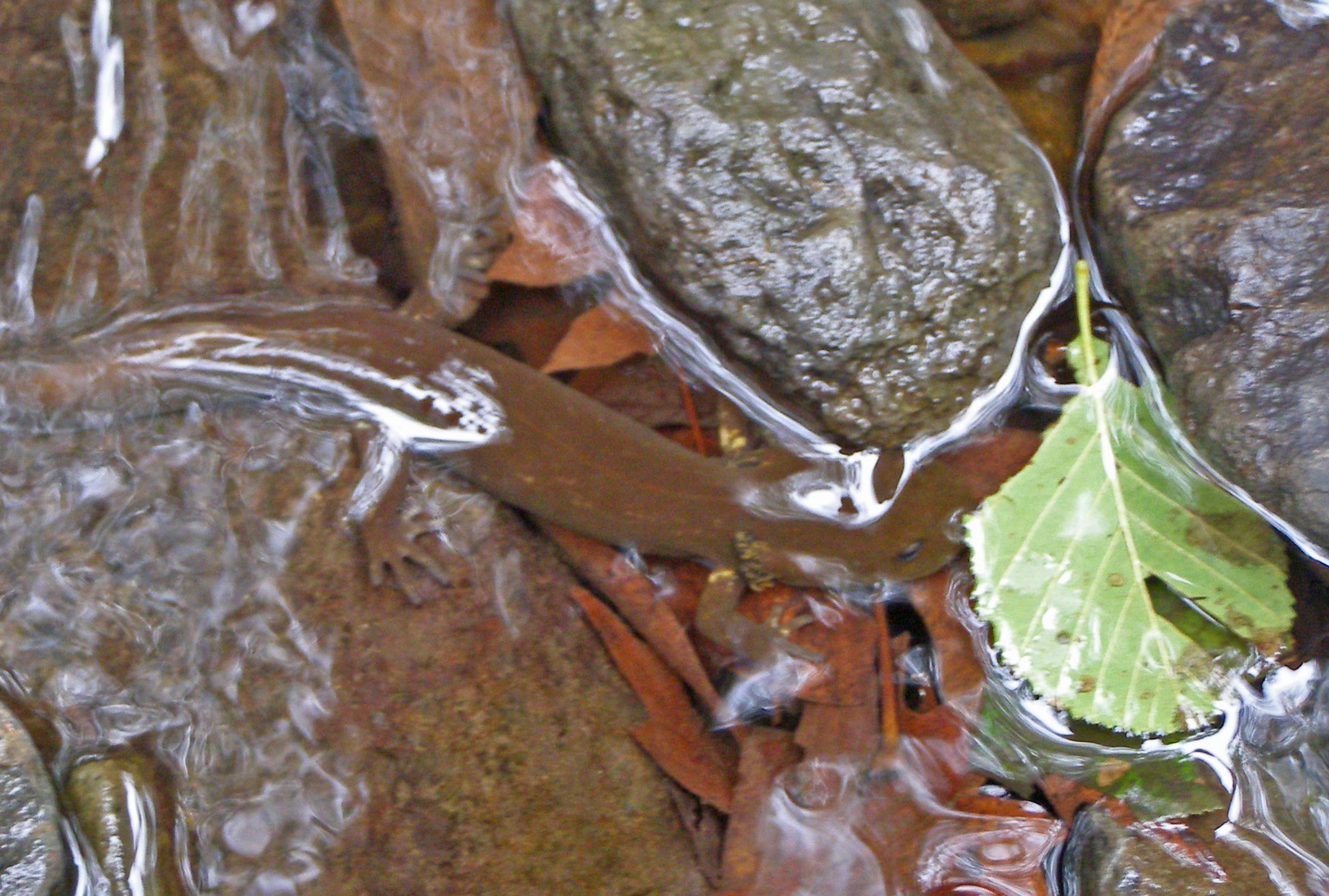
Partially submerged Pacific giant salamander larva, Copeland Creek

Copeland Creek and its tributaries drain this property; moreover, all of these streams rise on Sonoma Mountain and eventually discharge to the Laguna de Santa Rosa, which discharges to the Russian River. The Copeland Creek watershed is the southernmost drainage in the Russian River drainage basin. All creeks south of Copeland, beginning with Lichau Creek, are part of the San Francisco Bay watershed. Precipitation within the Copeland Creek watershed is considered moderate within the state of California; in fact, the maximum intensity for an historic one-hour rainfall is classified as below average (at about 1.90 inches (48 millimeters) per hour). Since many of these upper reaches of Copeland Creek involve steep slopes, often above 50 percent, the momentum of streamflow in winter months is high. Even though soils in the watershed are moderately erosive, the extensive basaltic armoring of Copeland Creek minimizes sedimentation and produces an outcome of stream waters lacking in significant turbidity.

== Ecology ==
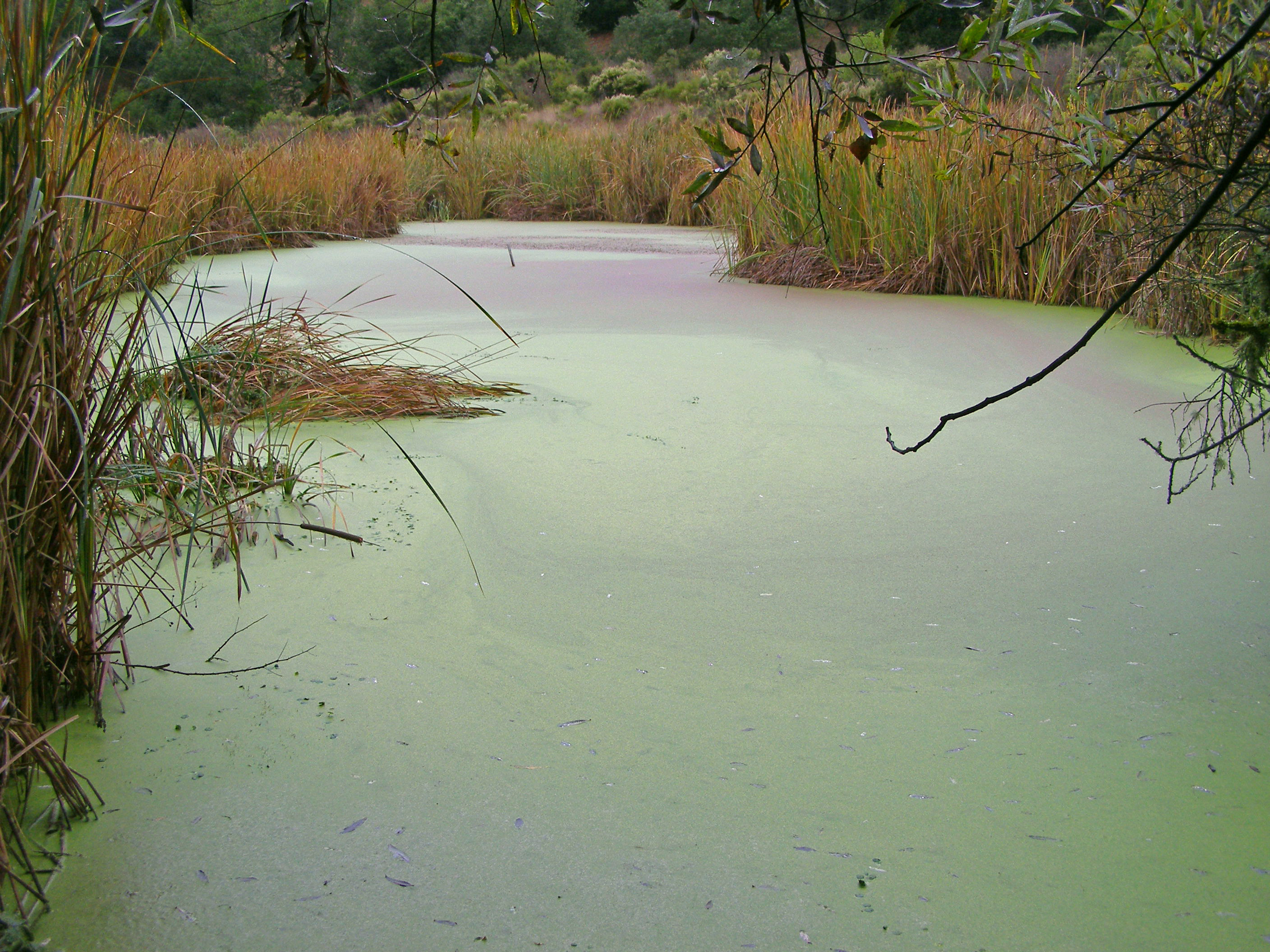
Turtle Pond with surface duckweed, Fairfield Osborn Preserve

Principal plant communities within the Preserve include the dominant California oak woodland savanna, and also consist of chaparral, marsh, native Bunch grass, douglas-fir woodland and riparian woodland. Within the oak woodland the main tree species are Coast live oak, Oregon oak, California black oak, Canyon live oak and California bay laurel. The woodland understory exhibits toyon, coffeeberry, poison oak and, in the higher exposed areas with ecotones to chaparral, containing chiefly coyote brush. This community sometimes gradates to small grassland savannas between the oak groves, which are rich with grasses and annual wildflowers. Example plants in this community are the yellow hayfield tarweed, Hemizonia congesta spp. congesta and the hayfield tarweed, Hemizonia congesta spp. luzulifolia, which are seen blooming in the late autumn.

The freshwater marsh was formed by massive land movement along the Rodgers Creek Fault. The two ponds on the property are manmade, having been created in the early 20th century. These wetland communities are important habitat for many species including sora and Virginia rails, western pond turtles, and the federally listed endangered Red-legged Frog. Moreover, natural seeps feed these locations and the outcome is climax vegetation that has stabilized. Turtle Pond has a layer of duckweed on the water surface that is consumed by a variety of fauna. Riparian zones of Copeland Creek have a very high percentage population of California bay laurel, but also provide habitat for a rich variety of amphibians, newts and other fauna. The Pacific giant salamander, one of the largest known species of salamander is observed hunting for prey in Copeland Creek. Other amphibians seen in riparian habitats include the Pacific treefrog, Hyla regilla, Rough skinned newt, Taricha granulosa, and California slender salamander, Batrachoseps attenuatus. A number of plants are particular to the deeply shaded riparian zone including snowberry and the uncommon California ginseng, Aralia californica.

== History ==
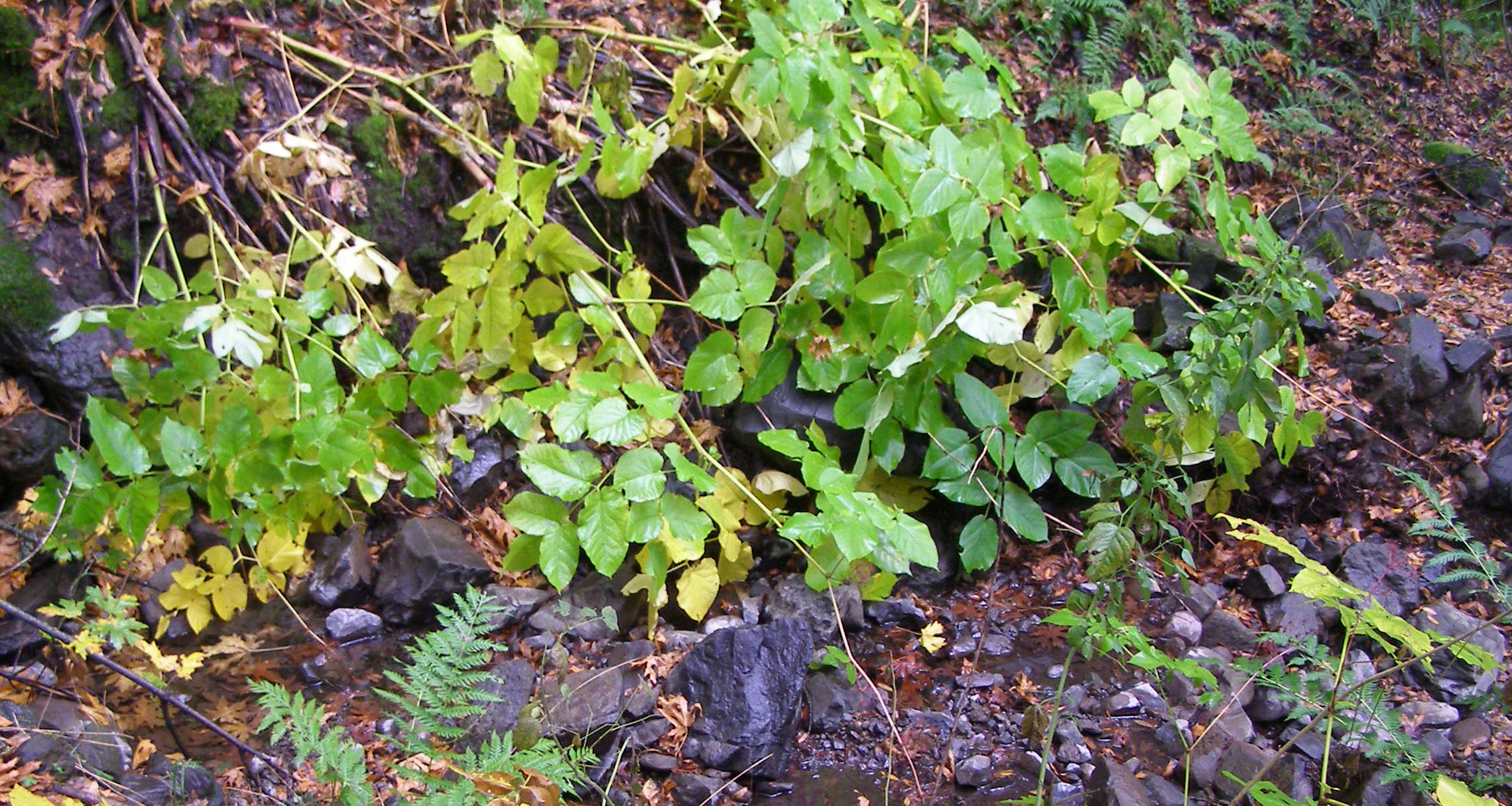
The California Ginseng plant growing above Copeland Creek

Archeological surface surveys indicate that the site was used as a seasonal hunting and gathering ground by Pomo, Miwok, and Wappo people, who traveled extensively to forage and barter. The earliest historical records show the property was within a Spanish Land Grant in the 1860s. During the latter part of the 19th century, agricultural uses intensified, especially in the form of grazing, although the extent of ecological damage was not as severe as the lower grazed slopes of Sonoma Mountain. By the 1890s the land was a working sheep and cattle ranch held by the Duerson family. In the 1950s, the land was purchased by William Matson Roth for use as a summer family retreat. William and his wife Joan transferred the land to The Nature Conservancy in 1972, with the resulting preserve being named for Joan's father, conservationist and author Henry Fairfield Osborn, Jr. In 1977, The Nature Conservancy leased the preserve to Sonoma State University (SSU), which conducts environmental education field trips for as many as 4,000 school children a year.

In 1997, ownership was transferred to SSU, which continues to use it for research and environmental education. In 2004, 190 adjacent acres (76 ha) were added to the preserve by gift of William and Joan Roth. Both parcels are managed under conservation easements from The Nature Conservancy and the Sonoma County Agricultural Preservation and Open Space District. In 2009 SSU established a unit within the School of Science and Technology named Field Stations and Nature Preserves, which manages both the Fairfield Osborn and the Galbreath Wildlands Preserves. The director is Dr. Claudia Luke . Program coordinator for the preserves is Suzanne DeCoursey.

== Practical aspects ==
The Preserve is open for research and educational programs, and public visitation is permitted by guided tour only. While most docents are students from Sonoma State University, many derive from the community at large. Tours are offered at 10 am on Saturdays during the fall and spring. In addition to the nature hike guided tours by trained naturalists, there are periodic special workshops taught by Sonoma State University faculty and other scientists, covering such special topics as geology, mycology and amphibians.

The Preserve lies between Petaluma and Santa Rosa, California; access may be achieved from Petaluma Hill Road, and thence to Roberts Road and Lichau Road. On route along Roberts Road, one can obtain glimpses of the channel restoration work on lower Copeland Creek conducted during the late 1990s; this work featured erosion control, native riparian planting and eliminating access by cattle. The paved access route also features a stretch of gravity hill, an optical illusion which makes the motorist feel like a stretch of roadway appearing to be uphill, in fact, is a downhill extent.

== See also ==
- Basalt
- California Coast Ranges
