= Laguna de Santa Rosa =

Wetland in California, United States

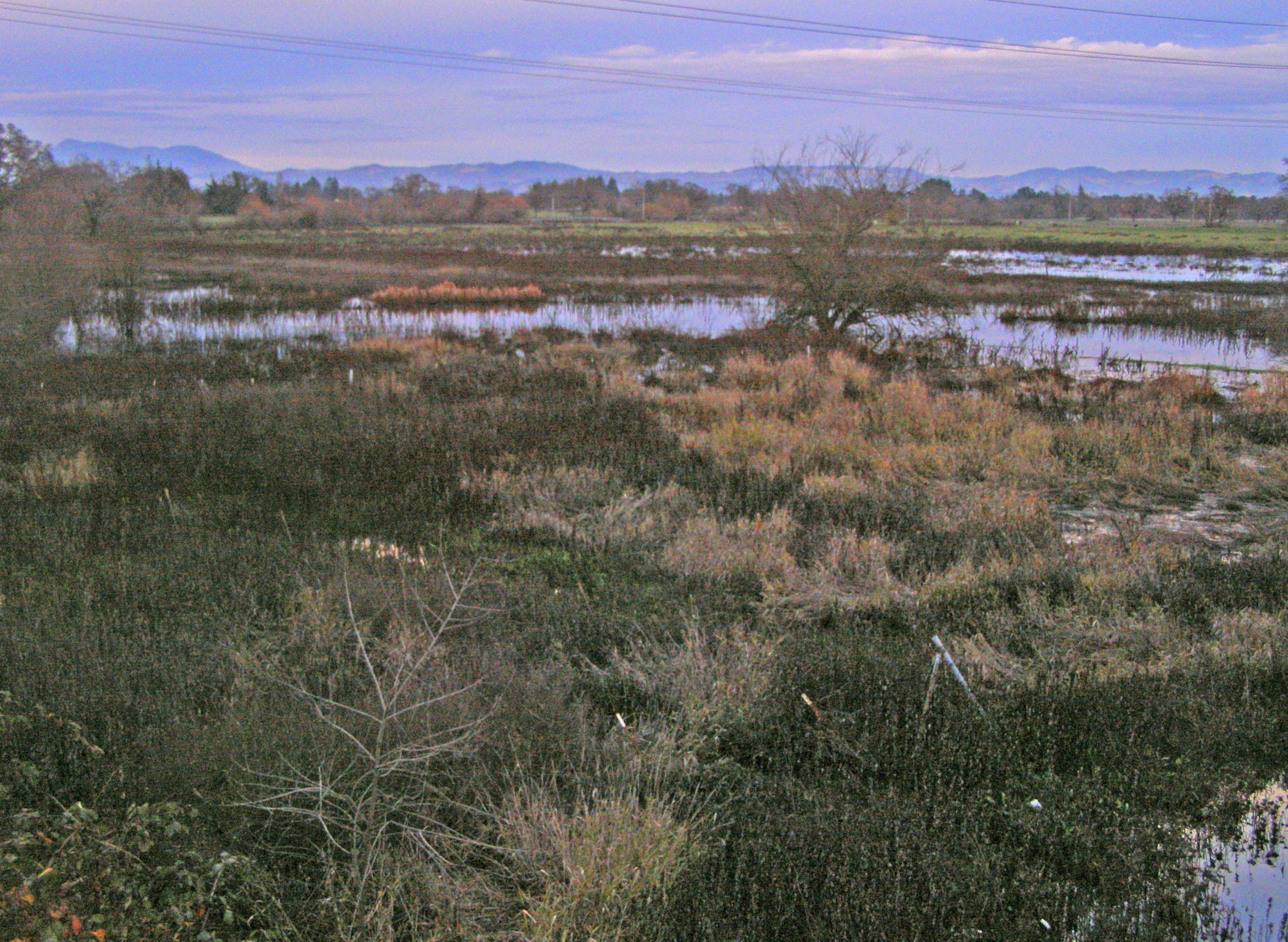
- Looking northeast across the Laguna de Santa Rosa with the Mayacamas Mountains in the background

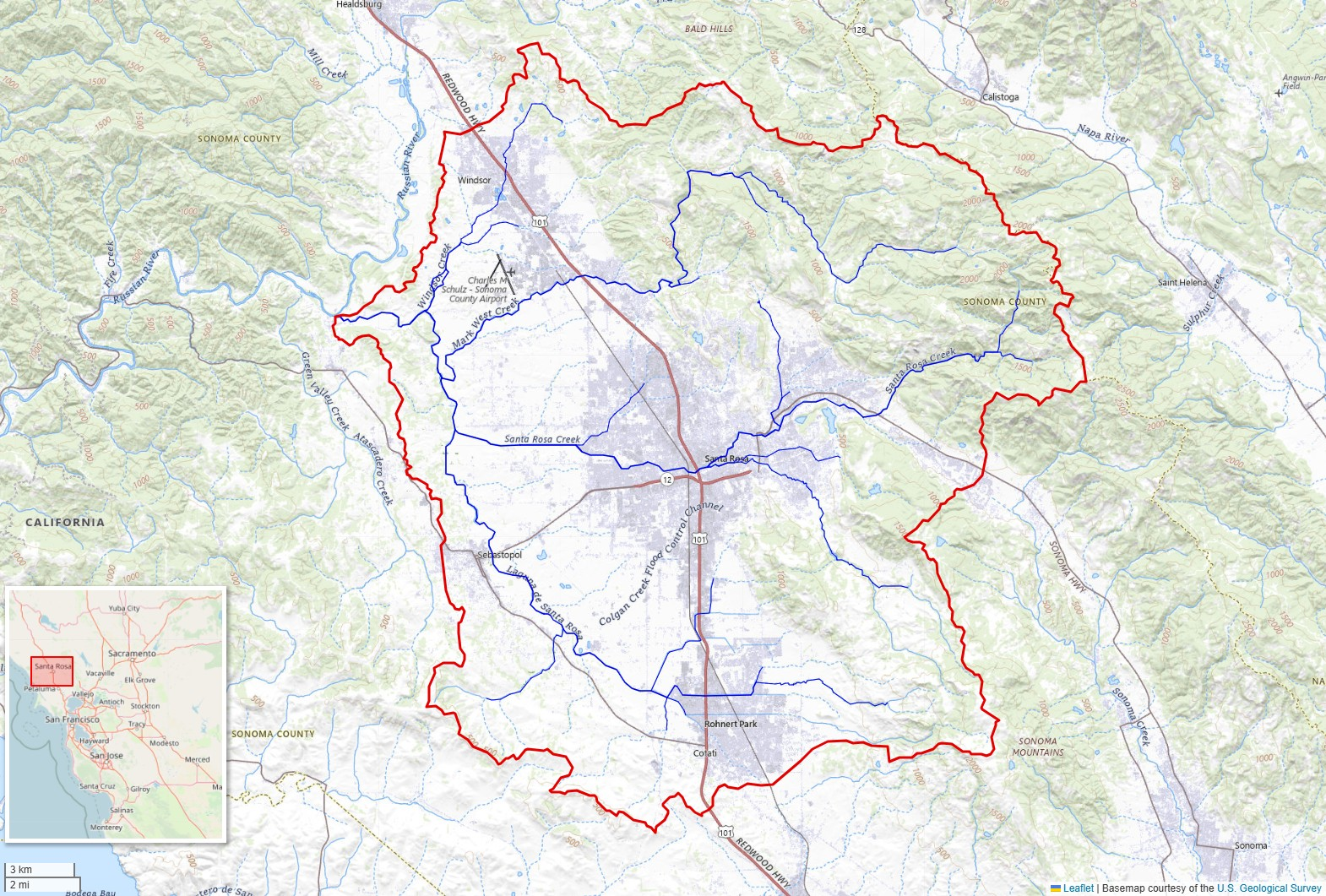
- Laguna de Santa Rosa watershed (Interactive map)
- Etymology: Spanish

Location
- Country: United States
- State: California
- Region: Sonoma County
- Cities: Santa Rosa, Sebastopol, Cotati

Physical characteristics
- Source
  - location: west of Cotati, California
  - coordinates: 38°19′4″N 122°43′21″W
  - elevation: 260 ft (79 m)
- Mouth: Mark West Creek
  - location: east of Forestville, California
  - coordinates: 38°28′12″N 122°50′27″W
  - elevation: 46 ft (14 m)
- Length: 22 mi (35 km)
- Basin size: 254 sq mi (660 km^{2})

Basin features
- Tributaries
  - left: Washoe Creek, Blucher Creek
  - right: Santa Rosa Creek, Hinebaugh Creek, Five Creek
- Protection status

Ramsar Wetland
- Official name: Laguna de Santa Rosa Wetland Complex
- Designated: 16 April 2010
- Reference no.: 1930

The Laguna de Santa Rosa is a 22-mile-long (35 km) wetland complex that drains a 254-square-mile (660 km^{2}) watershed encompassing most of the Santa Rosa Plain in Sonoma County, California, United States.

The California Office of Environmental Health Hazard Assessment has issued a safe eating advisory for any fish caught in Laguna de Santa Rosa due to elevated levels of mercury and PCBs. In addition, there is a notice of "do not eat" for black bass.

== Description ==
The Laguna, whose principal tributary streams rise on the southern slopes of the Sonoma and Mayacamas Mountains, is the largest tributary of Mark West Creek. The sinuous watercourse and associated wetlands form a significant floodplain during the heavy winter rains, capable of storing over 80,000 acre-feet (99,000,000 m^{3}) of stormwater.

Beyond its hydrological significance, the Laguna is Sonoma County's richest area of wildlife habitat, and the most biologically diverse part of the county, having been called a "national treasure" for its ecological wealth. A number of rare and endangered species occur in the Laguna, including federally listed threatened and endangered anadromous salmonid species and three endangered plants that are endemic here. From about 1870 to 1990 water quality and biota deteriorated in the Laguna, due to intensification of urban development and associated agricultural encroachment into the floodplain. In the 1990s the trend began to reverse, but the watercourse is still listed as impaired under the federal Clean Water Act for sediment, nitrogen, phosphorus, temperature, mercury, and dissolved oxygen, rendering it the most impaired water body on the North Coast of California. Notwithstanding the large historical reduction in resource extent, the Laguna de Santa Rosa is presently the second-largest freshwater wetland in coastal Northern California and still habitat to over 200 species of birds, threatened and endangered salmonid species, bald and golden eagle, osprey, mountain lion, river otter, coyote, bobcat, mink, and gray fox.

While the Laguna has been heavily impacted by human activities in its watershed over the past century, in recent years a movement has grown to preserve and restore it both for ecological functions such as habitat values and flood control capacity, and for outdoor recreation, education, and research. The nonprofit Laguna de Santa Rosa Foundation, founded in 1989, has professionalized and expanded the scope of its programs since 2002, spearheading efforts to protect, restore, and create opportunities for the public to enjoy and learn in the Laguna.

=== Course ===
The principal source of the Laguna de Santa Rosa lies in the hills on the east side of U.S. Route 101 near Cotati, California. Its waters descend to the west, crossing under U.S. Route 101 and into Cotati at the West Sierra Avenue interchange. It flows under the Old Redwood Highway just south of Charles Street and joins with a drainage channel near the end of Marsh Way. (Some sources consider this channel to be the main Laguna de Santa Rosa.)

From this confluence, the Laguna turns to the northwest and crosses under East Cotati Avenue, providing portions of the boundary between Cotati and Rohnert Park. It crosses back under U.S. Route 101 near Southwest Boulevard and leaves Cotati, continuing northwestward through a series of confluences, with Copeland Creek, Washoe Creek, Hinebaugh Creek, and Five Creek. It crosses Llano Road near the regional water treatment plant, then crosses Todd Road and joins Blucher Creek. East of Sebastopol, it crosses under State Route 12 at milepost 9.63 and turns to the north. Just south of Guerneville Road, the Santa Rosa Flood Control Channel enters the Laguna, bringing water from Santa Rosa Creek and its tributaries. The Laguna continues north, emptying into Mark West Creek amidst the wetlands east of Forestville.

== History ==
Archaeological data in southern Sonoma County indicates the land surrounding the Laguna de Santa Rosa was under the control of three Pomo tribelets which together, controlled about 350 square miles (910 km^{2}). These Pomo peoples were called the Konhomtara, the Kataictemi, and the Bitakomtara, whose languages were mutually unintelligible.

The Konhomtara's territory included "…the area of present day Sebastopol, bounded on the east by the Laguna, on the north by the Russian River, on the west by the summit of the mountains nearest the coast, and on the south by an indeterminate line that extended from the south end of the Laguna to the western border (Stewart, 1943)".

The Kataictemi held the land on both sides of the Russian River north of Mark West Creek. Their northern border was about two miles (3 km) north of present-day Healdsburg, and included the lower portion of Dry Creek.

The Bitakomtara may have been two tribelets, with one located at the head of Santa Rosa Creek, and the other located in Santa Rosa, the latter holding the eastern Laguna lands. Bitakomtara territory occupied the land that was bordered on the north by Mark West Creek, on the West by the Laguna, on the south by "an indefinite line that ran from the top of Sonoma Mountain to the South end of the Laguna" and on the east by the summit of the Mayacamas Mountains southward to the peak of Sonoma Mountain (located adjacent to Rohnert Park).

The "South end of the Laguna" was and is as far south as the town of Cotati, approximately 4.5 miles (7.2 km) south of Rohnert Park.

Supporting the claim that these three Pomo tribelets were the occupants of the territory is the fact that there are over 80 archaeological sites that have been identified within the Laguna's historic marshlands as being Pomo. Some of the sites are on the floodplains on the western margin of the Laguna.

The rich wetlands of the Laguna were an important resource for the Pomo people. Control of these resources created a reported tension between the three Pomo tribelets themselves, and territorial borders appear to have been strictly enforced. Permission was needed to pass through each tribelet's territory. If, for example, the Konhomtara wished to fish on the Russian River, they had to gain permission from the Kataictemi. (Note: The above paragraphs are based on the work of David A. Fredrickson, Ph.D. and Daniel W. Markwyn, Ph.D.)

The ancient Laguna of 2000 BC supported these tribes with abundant fish, fowl and tule reeds for constructing homes and canoes. In 1833, the original Mexican land grant occurred that involved lands of the Laguna watershed. In the year 1870, the railroad arrived with associated channelizations and intensification of agricultural uses. By the 1960s, encroachment of the vast eastern plain was almost complete, and the previously rich run of 1.6 million anadromous fish had virtually collapsed. By 1989 over 92 percent of the Laguna's historic riparian habitat had been lost, and its water quality had reached critically poor levels.

Historically the Laguna was the receiving waters for untreated (and later treated) sewage from adjacent cities, which eventually joined to participate in a regional sanitation district under the management of the city of Santa Rosa; to some degree due to regulatory action, litigation and pressure from local advocates, the city has become a partner in Laguna restoration by improving the treatment level of this wastewater and minimizing discharge through tertiary wastewater irrigation reuse for hay farming. Though concerns remain relating to compliance and management of this system, Santa Rosa's wastewater treatment and management system is considered to be one of the most progressive in the nation.

In that year the Laguna de Santa Rosa Foundation was formed to mobilize public and private resources for preservation and restoration of this natural area. The Foundation has developed education programs, implemented a number of hydrological and ecological restoration projects, and published Enhancing and Caring for the Laguna, a restoration and management plan for the Laguna watershed, in 2006. Primarily funded by the California Coastal Conservancy and developed with participation by hundreds of Laguna stakeholder organizations and individuals, the plan serves as a framework for improvement of the Laguna's ecological functions and development of trail access. The Foundation is now in the process of designing, funding and implementing projects to meet the goals of this plan.

== Geology ==
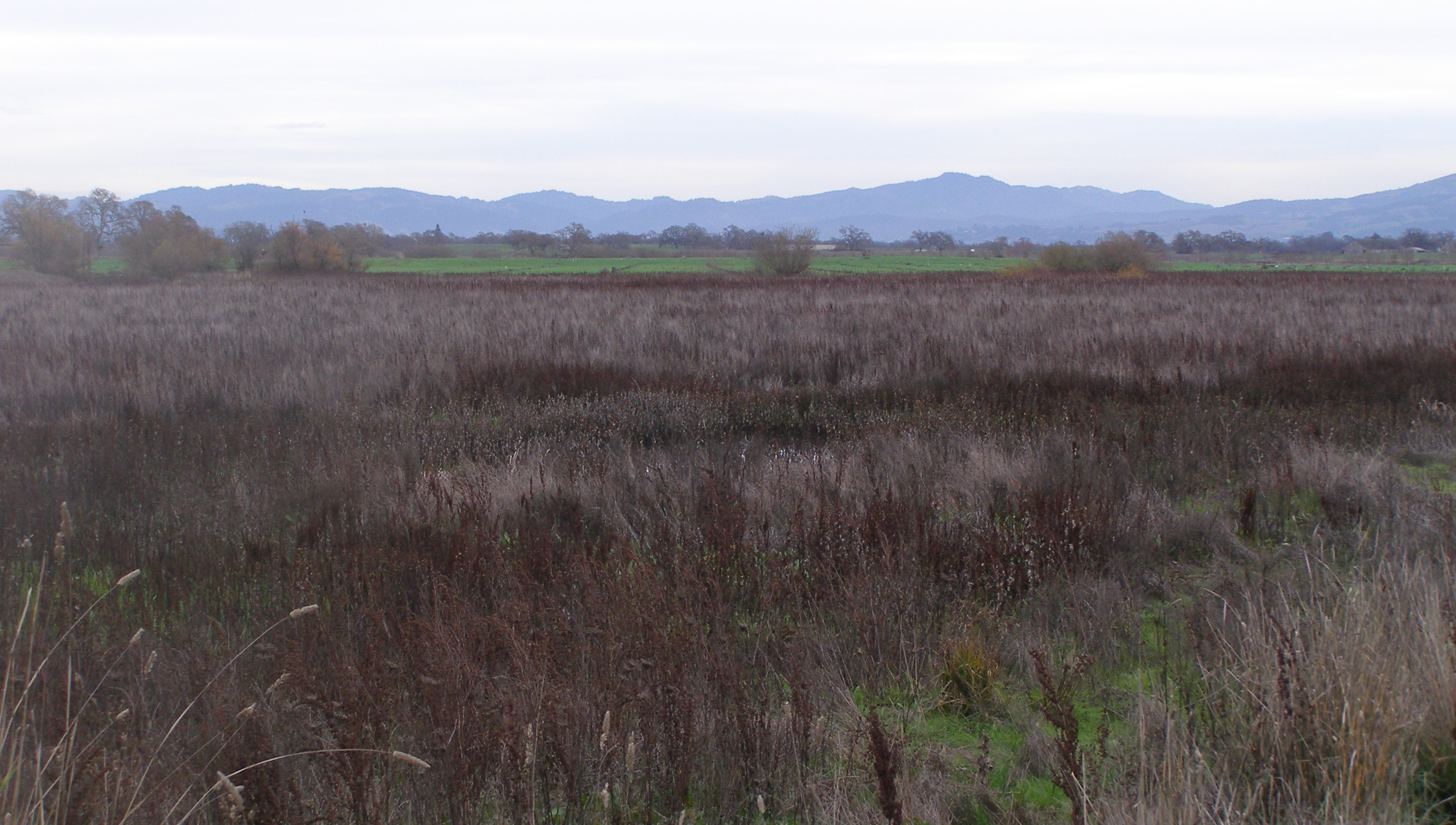
Looking east across the Laguna de Santa Rosa floodplain, with the Mayacamas Mountains in the background

As recently as the Miocene period, this entire region was submerged below the Pacific Ocean. Around 12 million years ago, processes of uplift and volcanic action formed the Mayacamas and Sonoma Mountains to the east and established the main geomorphic features of the present day landscape. Millions of years of stream erosion carving these mountains led to the rich soils of the Santa Rosa Plain and the Laguna de Santa Rosa drainage that meandered on the vast plain. The western hills are much less pronounced in elevation, and contribute far less to the drainage area of the basin.

Soil types within the Laguna are quite complex and vary by reach. Many of the soils of the immediate Laguna area are classified as Clear Lake clay; these soils are associated with regions of poor drainage, and are underlain by alluvium and sedimentary rock. The surface of these soils is typically dark gray, and soils acidity ranges from slight to medium for the first 39 inches (100 cm) of depth; underlying this upper soil layer is a moderately alkaline dark gray clay. Deeper, typically below 46 inches (117 cm), is a gray and light brownish gray moderately alkaline clay. Wright loams are also present within the Laguna. The slope of the drainage basin is typically zero to two percent.

== Hydrology and water quality ==
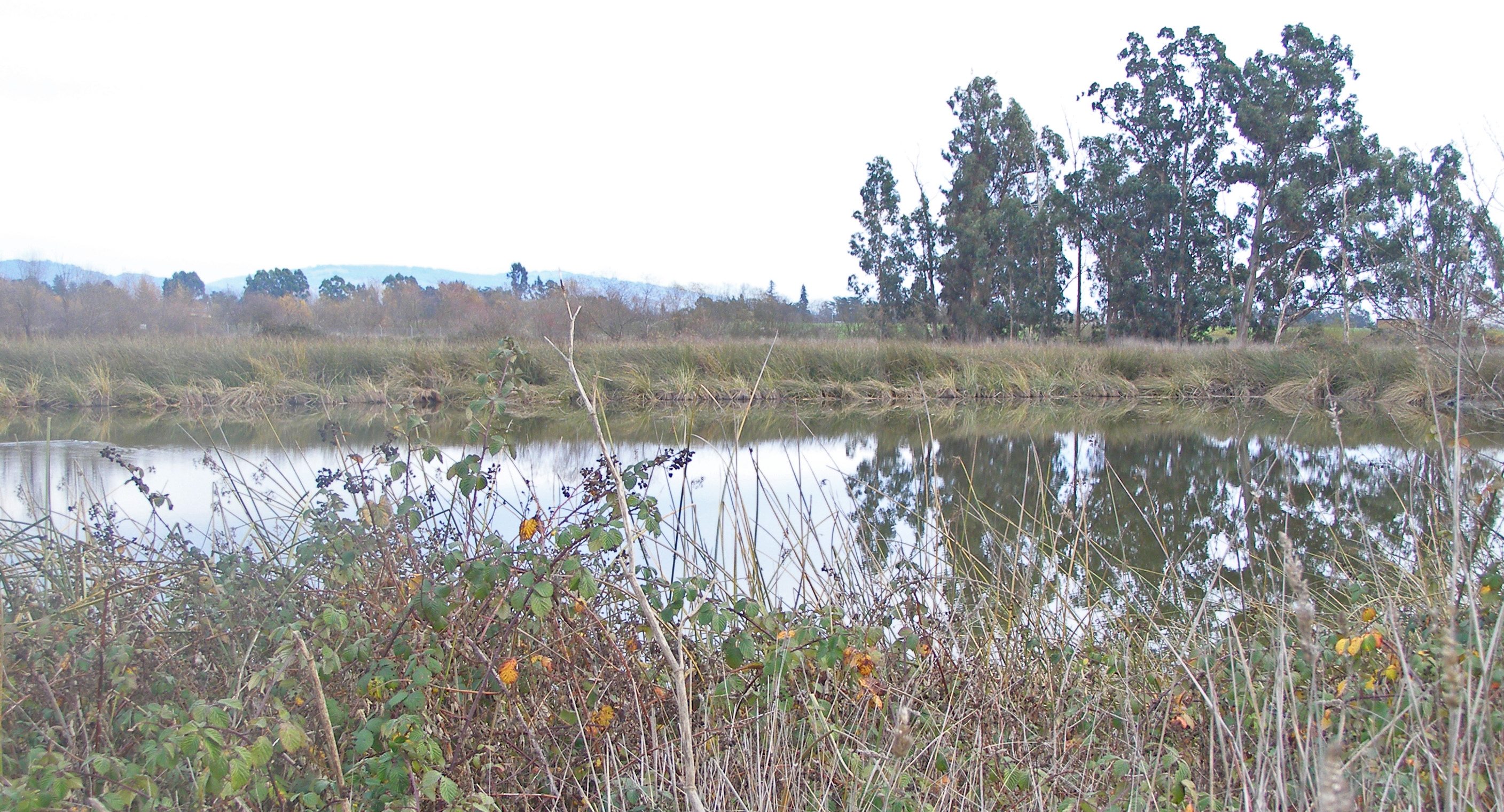
Tule-edged pond for water polishing treatment of effluent from City of Santa Rosa sewage treatment, Laguna de Santa Rosa

The Laguna de Santa Rosa is a principal tributary of Mark West Creek. Largest among the many tributaries of the Laguna are Santa Rosa Creek, Copeland Creek, Hinebaugh Creek, Five Creek, Washoe Creek and Blucher Creek. The Laguna consists of a winding ribbon of flow in the dry summer season and a massive floodplain that resembles a series of lakes in the winter storm season. There are numerous vernal pools on the floodplain that extend for miles to the east, which support many rare and endangered species.

With regard to water quality, the Laguna de Santa Rosa is listed as Impaired under the federal Clean Water Act for sediment, nitrogen, phosphorus, temperature, mercury, and dissolved oxygen, its six such listings being the most of any water body on the North Coast of California.

== Ecology ==
The Laguna de Santa Rosa provides recreation and agricultural and industrial water supply plus wildlife habitat including cold freshwater habitat. The Laguna is a complex of habitat types including freshwater riparian forest and floodplains, seasonal wetlands and vernal pools, upland valley oak savanna and freshwater tule marsh. A number of rare and endangered species are found in the Laguna, such as the California tiger salamander (Ambystoma californiense), California freshwater shrimp (Syncaris pacifica) and Sebastopol meadowfoam (Limnanthes vinculans). As an element of the Pacific Flyway, the Laguna is home to a large variety of avifauna including Ridgway's rail, Canada goose (Branta canadensis), turkey vulture (Cathartes aura), black-necked stilt (Himantopus mexicanus), burrowing owl (Athene cunicularia), great egret (Casmerodius albus), great blue heron (Ardea herodias) and American kestrel (Falco sparverius). More than 200 species of birds are known to reside in or feed and rest in the Laguna in the course of migration. Salmonid species listed as threatened or endangered species are known to travel through the Laguna to spawn in its tributaries, including steelhead trout (Oncorhynchus mykiss) and coho salmon (Oncorhynchus kisutch).

== Stewardship and land management ==
Much of the Laguna's most important habitat is in private hands, and multiple public agencies regulate various aspects of the Laguna's water, lands and natural resources. At the federal level, the U.S. Army Corps of Engineers has played a role in analysis of water quality, especially related to sediment issues, and the National Marine Fisheries Service of the National Oceanographic and Atmospheric Administration regulates critical habitat and recovery efforts for threatened and endangered salmonid species. The state of California, through its Department of Fish and Game, has ownership involvement as well as an enforcement role in species protection, while the North Coast Regional Water Quality Control Board is responsible for regulating water quality in the Laguna. Locally, the Sonoma County Water Agency manages areas of the Laguna for flood control, and the City of Santa Rosa's Subregional wastewater System's main plant is located in the Laguna floodplain and owns and manages adjacent lands for storage and agricultural reuse of treated wastewater as well as for habitat values. The City of Sebastopol also owns lands in the Laguna which it manages as public parkland. In the private sector, the Laguna de Santa Rosa Foundation plays an active role in planning, public education, restoration, research and implementation of education programs in the Laguna.

On February 2, 2011, the Ramsar Convention on Wetlands recognized the Laguna as a wetlands of international importance. The designation, affecting 3,894 acres (1,576 ha) took effect on April 16, 2011.

== Bridges ==
At least ten bridges span the Laguna as it flows along the heavily populated U.S. Route 101 corridor:

- at Old Redwood Highway near Commerce Boulevard, a 24-foot (7 m) concrete culvert built in 1956
- at U.S. Route 101 northbound, a 22-foot (7 m) concrete culvert built in 1956
- at U.S. Route 101 southbound, a 22-foot (7 m) concrete tee beam built in 1919 and reconstructed in 1994
- at Redwood Drive, a 22-foot (7 m) concrete culvert built in 1956 and reconstructed in 2002
- at Llano Road, a 179-foot (55 m) concrete continuous slab built in 1962
- at Todd Road, a 152-foot (46 m) concrete continuous slab built in 1973
- at Stony Point Road, a 236-foot (72 m) concrete continuous slab built in 1960 and reconstructed in 1994
- at State Route 12, 220-foot (67 m) concrete continuous tee beam built in 1921, reconstructed in 1949 and reconstructed in 2017
- at Occidental Road, a 240-foot (73 m) concrete continuous slab built in 1990, and
- at Guerneville Road, a 446-foot (136 m) concrete continuous tee beam built in 1957.

== See also ==
- Coho salmon
- List of watercourses in the San Francisco Bay Area
- Santa Rosa Creek
