= Bear Creek (Sonoma Creek tributary) =

- Location of the mouth of Bear Creek in California

Location
- Country: United States
- State: California
- Region: Sonoma County

Physical characteristics
- Source
  - location: 4 mi (6 km) southwest of St. Helena, California
  - coordinates: 38°27′53″N 122°30′22″W
- Mouth: Sonoma Creek
  - location: 2 mi (3 km) northeast of Kenwood, California
  - coordinates: 38°26′35″N 122°31′56″W
  - elevation: 643 ft (196 m)
- Length: 2.8 mi (4.5 km)

Bear Creek is a 2.8-mile-long (4.5 km) stream in eastern Sonoma County, California, United States, a tributary of Sonoma Creek.

== Course ==
The stream originates near the Sonoma–Napa county line, about 0.6 miles (1.0 km) north of the northern Bald Mountain summit. It descends first to the west and then to the south, emptying into Sonoma Creek just west of Sugarloaf Ridge State Park.

== Habitat and pollution ==
As of 2000, Bear Creek supported steelhead trout.

== See also ==
- Graham Creek
- List of watercourses in the San Francisco Bay Area
- Yulupa Creek
