= Trione-Annadel State Park =

State park of California, U.S.

- IUCN category II (national park)
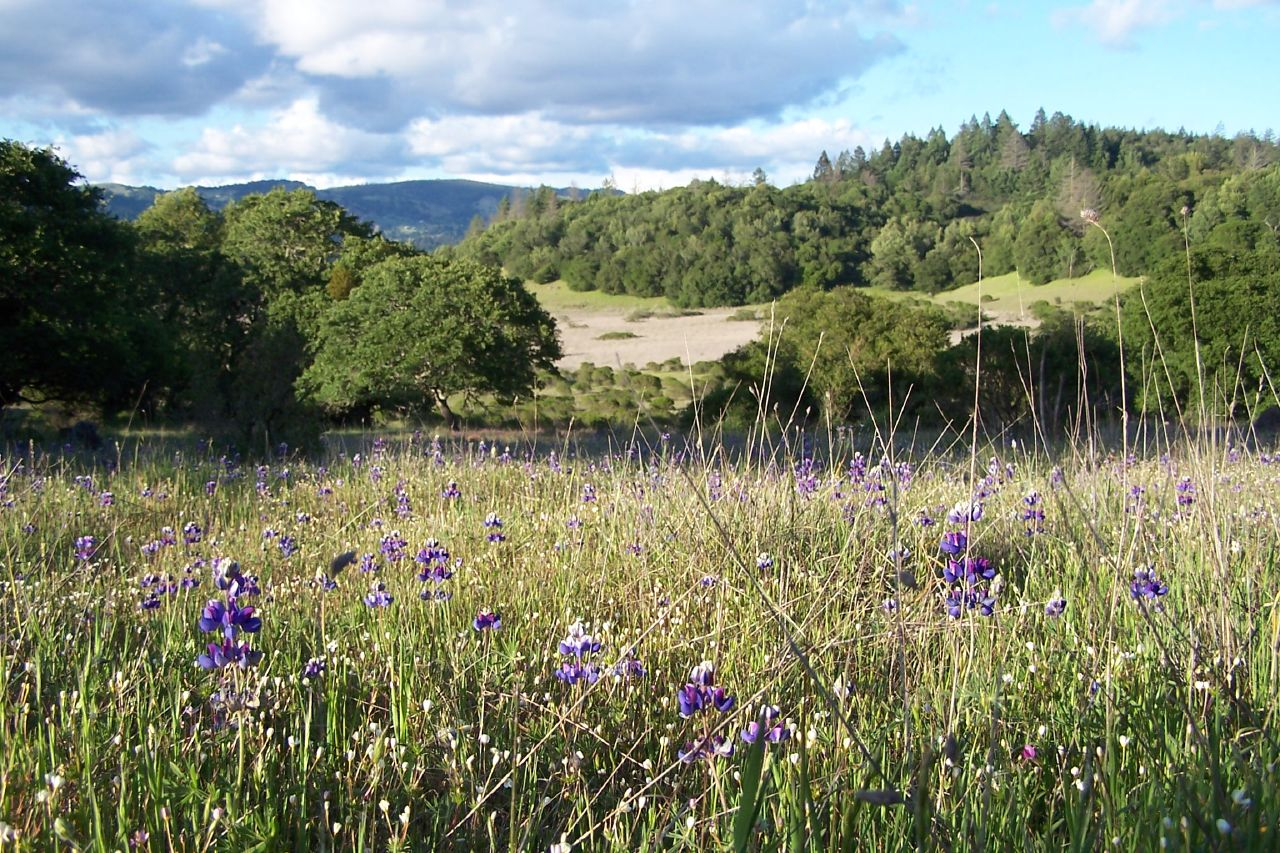
- Lupines in a meadow, Annadel State Park

- Location within California Location within the United States
- Location: Sonoma County, California, United States
- Nearest city: Kenwood, California; Santa Rosa, California
- Coordinates: 38°25′45″N 122°37′30″W
- Area: 5,092 acres (2,061 ha)
- Established: 1971
- Governing body: California Department of Parks and Recreation

Trione-Annadel State Park is a California state park in the United States. It is situated at the northern edge of Sonoma Valley and is adjacent to Spring Lake Regional Park in Santa Rosa. It offers many recreational activities within its 5,092-acre (2,061 ha) property.

The rock formations of Trione-Annadel have played a central role in its history: its volcanic origins, the Native American use of obsidian, the early 1900s mining of cobblestones, and modern hikers' appreciation of its volcanic rock outcrops.

These lands were occupied by the Wappo and Pomo people in prehistoric times, who would have primarily inhabited the riparian zones and the marsh perimeter. Annadel includes what some biologists consider the best example of undisturbed northern oak woodlands in existence. Visitors can enjoy the park's diverse wildlife and scenery during any time of the year but are perhaps most rewarded from April through June when most wildflowers are in bloom.

The 2017 Nuns fire burned the southern portion of the park. In 2020, the Glass fire burned the northern edge of the park.

== Ecology ==
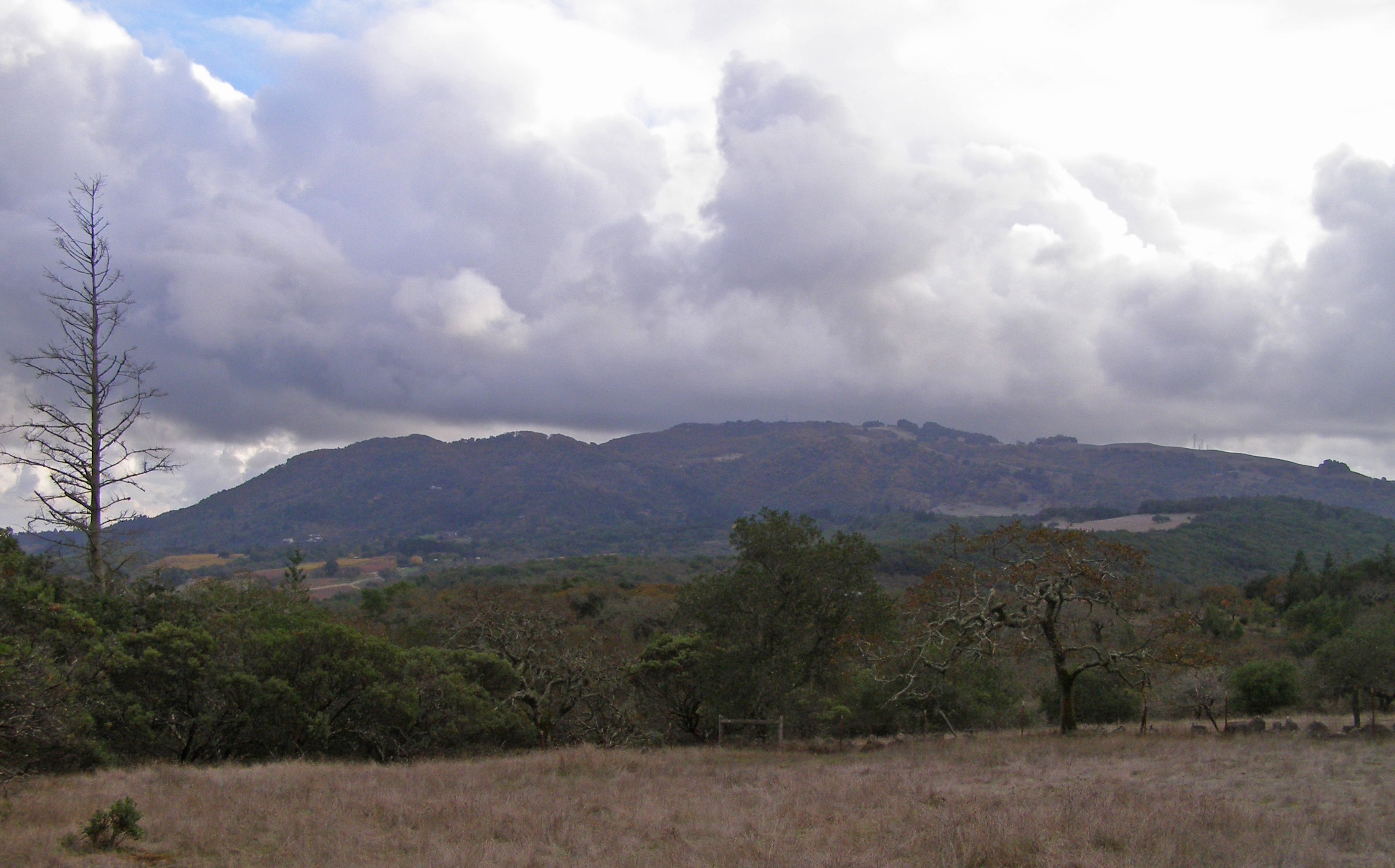
View from southern mountain flanks of Annadel looking toward Sonoma Mountain.

Plant communities include California oak woodland, riparian woodland, Douglas fir forest, chaparral, grassland, and marsh. The dominant plant community is the oak woodland, which has a canopy of coast live oak, Garry oak, black oak, Pacific madrone, bigleaf maple, and California laurel. Canyon live oak occurs in swales and creeks. In the oak woodlands, the dominant understory plants are native bunchgrasses, toyon, wild blackberry, coyote brush, and western poison-oak. The latter covers nearly one quarter of the understory in the park. Douglas fir occurs in some of the steeper, cooler riparian zones and on north-facing slopes.

Common animals in Annadel include black-tailed deer, western gray squirrel, raccoon, skunk, and opossum. Bobcat and mountain lion are occasionally observed. There are many bird species, including the California scrub jay, Steller's jay, acorn woodpecker, black phoebe, and dark-eyed junco. In moist areas, amphibians such as the rough-skinned newt can be found.

== Hydrology and geology ==
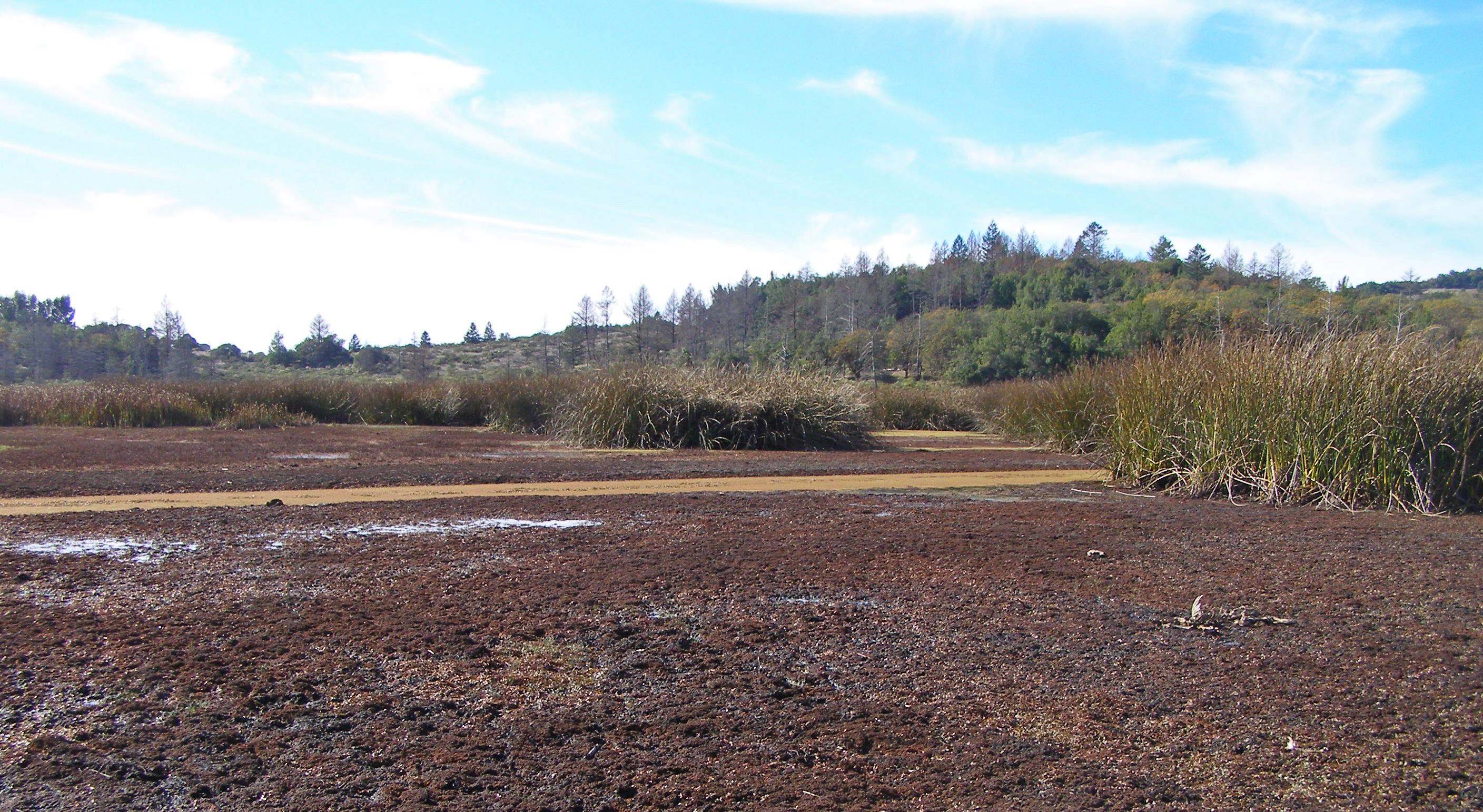
Ledson Marsh within Annadel

The southern reaches of Annadel are drained by Yulupa Creek and other tributaries of Sonoma Creek, while the northern flanks are part of the Santa Rosa Creek watershed. Eastern slopes are drained by Yulupa and Sonoma Creeks, while the western slopes are part of the Spring Creek watershed. Many of Annadel's streams are dry in the summer, because rainfall is highly seasonal, with most of the approximately 30 inches (76 cm) of annual precipitation occurring between October and April. Ledson Marsh, which drains into Yulupa Creek, retains some smaller pools of water throughout most of the year. The highest elevation in the park is the top of Bennett Mountain, 1,887 feet (575 m).

The entirety of Annadel was below the ocean floor as recently as twelve million years ago, around which time massive uplift and volcanic action formed the massif which comprises the park of today. Elevations in Annadel range from about 360 to 1,880 feet (110 to 570 m) above sea level. Slopes within Annadel commonly range from 15 to 30 percent, but it is not uncommon to encounter slopes up to 70 percent on steep slopes above drainages which are covered in douglas fir forest. One of the major soil associations within the park is Goulding cobbly clay loam, which contains roughly 25 percent cobblestones with some basaltic exposures, evidence of the volcanic origins of the Sonoma Mountains. Typical soil depths are 35 to 50 centimetres (14 to 20 in). Much of the soil type in the Yulupa Creek riparian zone consists of Laniger loam, with rhyolite outcrops, another relic of the igneous history.

== History ==
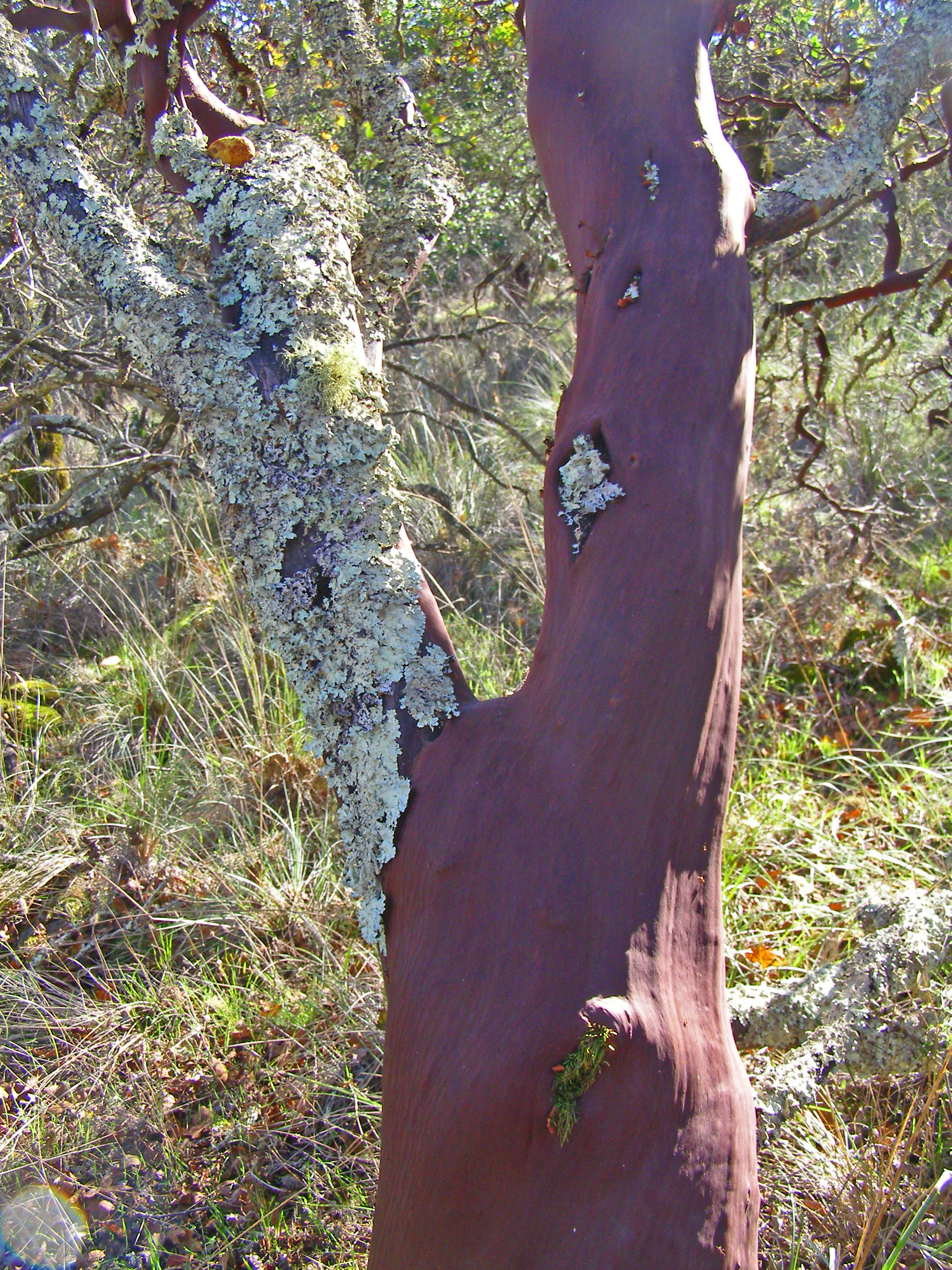
Manzanita of 12-inch (30 cm) diameter, Annadel State Park

The Southern Pomo and Southern Wappo peoples inhabited these lands in prehistoric times. No full-scale villages have been discovered within the park boundaries. This site was valuable to the Native American tribes as a source of obsidian, which they used to make scrapers, knives, arrowheads, and spearheads. Archaeological evidence suggests they used the area as a quarry at least as far back as 3000 years. Human use and settlement of this area changed markedly in the late 18th century when the Spanish came to this region. Cattle ranching and farming gradually replaced hunting and gathering.

In 1837, Annadel was part of the Rancho Los Guilicos Mexican land grant. In 1848 the lands of Annadel were purchased by Scottish immigrant William Hood, for whom nearby Hood Mountain was named. In the late 19th century, sheep and cattle grazing was superseded by quarry uses. There was considerable demand for cobblestone material when many west coast cities were being developed, and especially in the reconstruction of San Francisco after the 1906 San Francisco earthquake. Cobblestone quarry operations were a major source of revenue to the Wymores and the Hutchinsons who were the principal land owners in this area around the year 1900. The park derives its name from Annie Hutchinson, since this locale was once termed "Annie's Dell". In the early 1900s, author Jack London settled nearby in these same Sonoma Mountains, and he based much of his writings on these mountains that he loved.

Demand for cobblestone subsided around the year 1920, since owners of the newly invented automobile expected a smoother ride than derived from cobblestone streets. Joe Coney began to accumulate land holdings in this area during the 1930s. He used the land for agricultural purposes until the late 1960s, though he also mined perlite, an obsidian product used in the manufacture of certain insulation products. Annadel became part of the California State Park system in the year 1971.

The site of what became Trione-Annadel was being eyed for residential development when Henry Trione and hunting buddy Joe Long of Long's Drugs put together a $5 million package that led ultimately to the site's protection as a park. Trione built his home on the hillside adjacent to Annadel. In 2012, he pitched in another $100,000 to keep the park running under county administration at a time when Annadel and dozens of other parks statewide were threatened with closure because of a budget crisis. It was due to these philanthropic efforts that the State of California ruled in July 2016 to officially change the name to Trione-Annadel State Park.

== Practical issues ==
The main park access is from the north via the city of Santa Rosa. An important secondary access is from the Lawndale Road trailhead in Kenwood, which access is the shortest route to Ledson Marsh. There are 35 miles (56 km) of trails for running, hiking, mountain biking, and trail riding. In addition, excellent black bass and bluegill fishing can be found at the park's largest body of water, Lake Ilsanjo. Dogs are not allowed in the park. There is potable water available at the visitor center and in the Channel drive parking lot.

=== Closure proposal ===
Annadel was one of 70 California state parks scheduled to close in 2012 by California Governor Jerry Brown. The County of Sonoma took on park operations as a temporary measure to keep it open.

== See also ==
- List of California state parks
- Matanzas Creek
- Sonoma Creek
- Sonoma Mountain
