= Hellinsia confusus =

Scientific classification
- Domain: Eukaryota
- Kingdom: Animalia
- Phylum: Arthropoda
- Class: Insecta
- Order: Lepidoptera
- Family: Pterophoridae
- Genus: Hellinsia
- Species: H. confusus

Binomial name
- Hellinsia confusus (Braun, 1930)

Synonyms
- Oidaematophorus confusus Braun, 1930

Species of plume moth

Hellinsia confusus is a moth of the family Pterophoridae that is found in North America, including California.

The larvae have been recorded feeding on Baccharis pilularis.
