= Calabazas Creek (Sonoma County) =

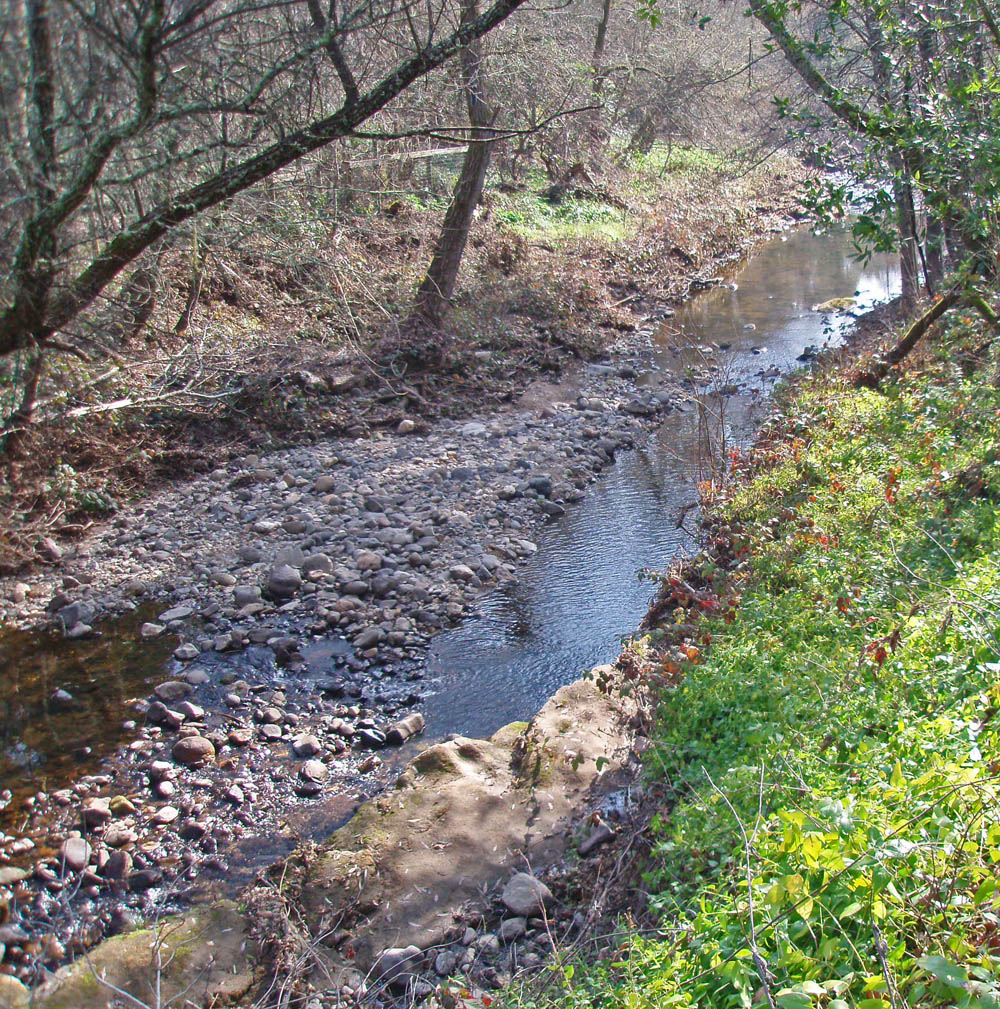
- Calabazas Creek steelhead run area immediately upstream of confluence with Sonoma Creek

- Location of the mouth of Calabazas Creek in California
- Etymology: Spanish

Location
- Country: United States
- State: California
- Region: Sonoma County
- City: Glen Ellen, California

Physical characteristics
- Source: Mayacamas Mountains
  - location: 4 mi (6 km) northeast of Glen Ellen, California
  - coordinates: 38°23′54″N 122°28′26″W
  - elevation: 530 ft (160 m)
- Mouth: Sonoma Creek
  - location: Glen Ellen, California
  - coordinates: 38°21′45″N 122°31′29″W
  - elevation: 236 ft (72 m)
- Length: 5.2 mi (8.4 km)
- Basin size: 7.7 sq mi (20 km^{2})

Basin features
- Tributaries
  - left: Stuart Creek

Calabazas Creek is a 5.5-mile-long (8.9 km) stream in the Sonoma Valley, California, United States, that rises in the southern Mayacamas Mountains and empties into Sonoma Creek near Glen Ellen.

== History ==
In the Spanish language, calabazas means squash, pumpkins or gourds. The word calabazas is found on a diseño of part of the Agua Caliente land grant in 1840, just west of the Arroyo de los Guilicos. Gudde felt that this stream may be an early record of Calabazas Creek, although the Los Guilicos Warm Springs are a little west of Calabazas Creek.

The site was home to the ranch of Mary Ellen Pleasant in 1890.

One of Sonoma County's oldest stone arch bridges, from the year 1915, spans Calabazas Creek near Dunbar School.

In 2004, the Sonoma County Agricultural Preservation and Open Space District acquired 1,290 acres (5.2 km^{2}) in this watershed for conservation purposes, and completed a Resource Management Plan in 2016. A separate plan for public access will be prepared in the future.

== Ecology ==
Calabazas Creek historically hosted a robust steelhead (Oncorhynchus mykiss) run. As late as 2001 spawning gravel studies were conducted in Calabazas along with Graham Creek, Bear Creek, Carriger Creek and mainstem Sonoma Creek; these studies demonstrated that adequacy of spawning gravels and absence of sedimentation are not limiting factors for anadromous fish propagation. Steelhead were found to be present during the District's resource inventory phase of preparing the 2016 Resource Management Plan.

The upper reaches of Calabazas Creek are relatively pristine with a dense forest canopy of mixed oak woodland, while the lower reaches on the Sonoma Valley floor have considerable encroachment by rural residential development, vineyards and other agricultural uses.

== Geology ==
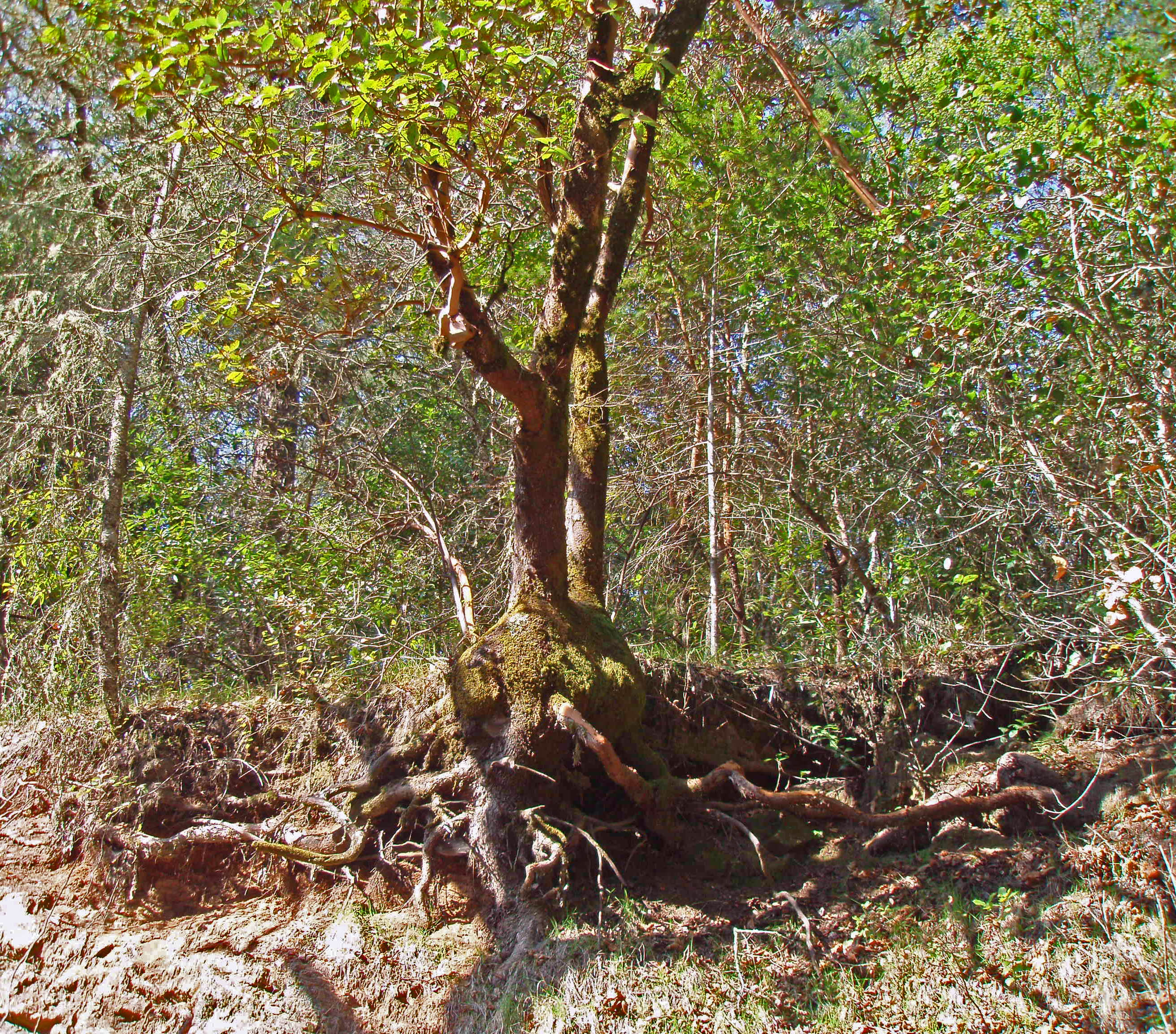
Madrone tree in upper watershed of Calabazas Creek, showing shallow rooting due to thin soil mantle.

Up until about twelve million years ago, this location was part of the seabed of the Pacific Ocean. In the Miocene era, precipitated by the combination of tectonic movement due to the seismically active environment and the presence of magma not far below the Earth's surface, a massive period of uplift ensued. This uplift formed the volcanically based Mayacamas Mountains. Residual evidence of these ancient geological features appears in the form of scattered outcrops of basalt and rhyolite as well as local hot springs such as nearby Mortons Hot Springs and Agua Caliente Hot Springs. Some rock quarrying was historically conducted near Nunns Canyon Road in the upper Calabazas Creek watershed.

== Course ==
Calabazas Creek originates about 4 mi (6 km) northeast of the town of Glen Ellen, California, just north of Trinity Road, at the top of Nunns Canyon. Its headwaters form from the convergence of several unnamed perennial streams. It descends in a westward direction through the canyon, augmented by the waters of Nunns Iron Spring and other tributaries, and parallels Nunns Canyon Road. It emerges into the Valley of the Moon and turns southward, passing under State Route 12 at milepost 29.41. It flows west of the town of Agua Caliente. As it parallels Henno Road southward into Glen Ellen, it is fed by Stuart Creek. Just after it crosses Arnold Drive, it empties into Sonoma Creek.

== Upper reach ==
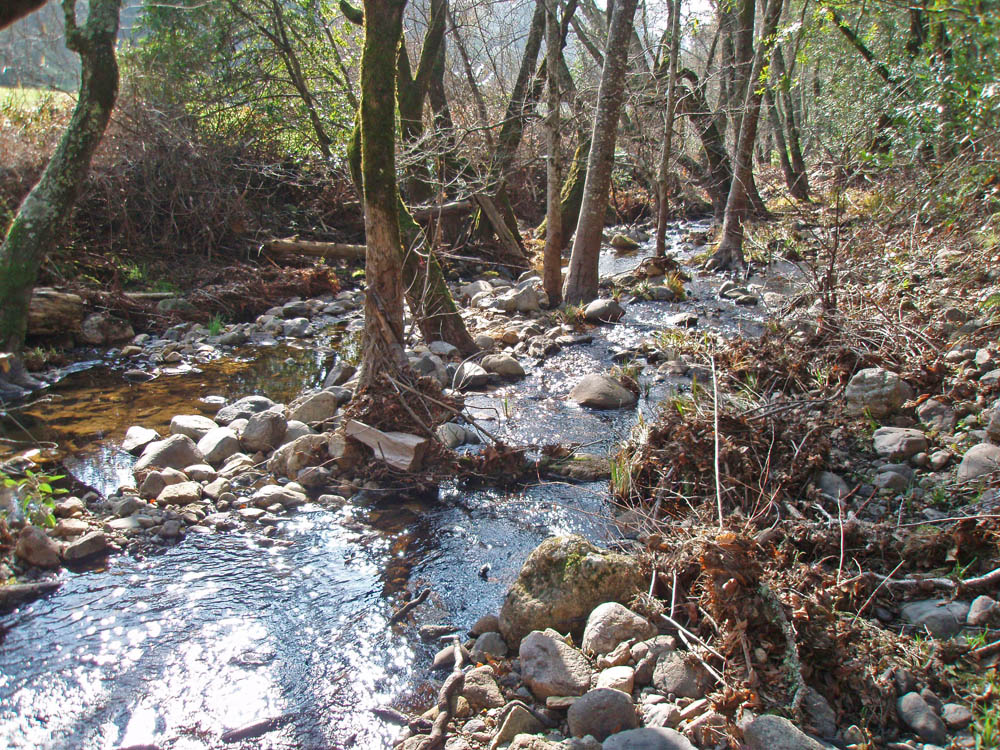
Riparian zone habitat of upper Calabazas Creek.

The upper reach can be defined as the portion of Calabazas Creek north of its crossing of State Route 12, which point lies approximately three miles upstream of the confluence with Sonoma Creek. Initially there are two large ranches on either side of Calabazas Creek: Beltane Ranch to the west and Atwood Ranch to the east. Proceeding upstream for the next mile, there is continuous close viewing of the creek, since Nunns Canyon Road runs near the top of the west stream banks. An abandoned rock quarry is situated about 0.3 miles (500 m) north of State Route 12 on the west bank.

Where Nunns Canyon Road terminates, Calabazas Creek enters into a 1,290 acre (5.2 km^{2}) open space nature preserve owned and managed by the Sonoma County Open Space District; as of 2007, there is no public access to this prior holding of the Beltane Ranch, which has been named the Calabazas Creek Open Space Preserve. In addition to a relatively pristine riparian zone, the upper Calabazas Creek has a high quality California oak woodland, much of which is an undisturbed ecosystem with considerable biodiversity, particularly in the upper 1.7 miles (2.5 km) of the headwaters. Some of the steeply sloped forested areas are characterized as good examples of such woodlands, testifying to the absence of historic grazing or other agriculture.

Besides the riparian habitat, the dominant plant community is the oak woodland, which has a canopy of coast live oak, Pacific madrone, Douglas fir, coast redwood and California laurel. In the oak woodlands, the dominant understory plants are native toyon, blackberry and western poison-oak. Common animals observed include black-tailed deer, gray squirrel, jackrabbit, raccoon, skunk and opossum. Less frequently mountain lion are seen. There is abundant birdlife including the scrub jay, Steller's jay, acorn woodpecker, black phoebe and junco. A number of amphibians occur near the creek and its tributary elements, including the rough skinned newt, Taricha granulosa.

== See also ==
- Basalt
- List of watercourses in the San Francisco Bay Area
- Miwok
