= Yulupa Creek =

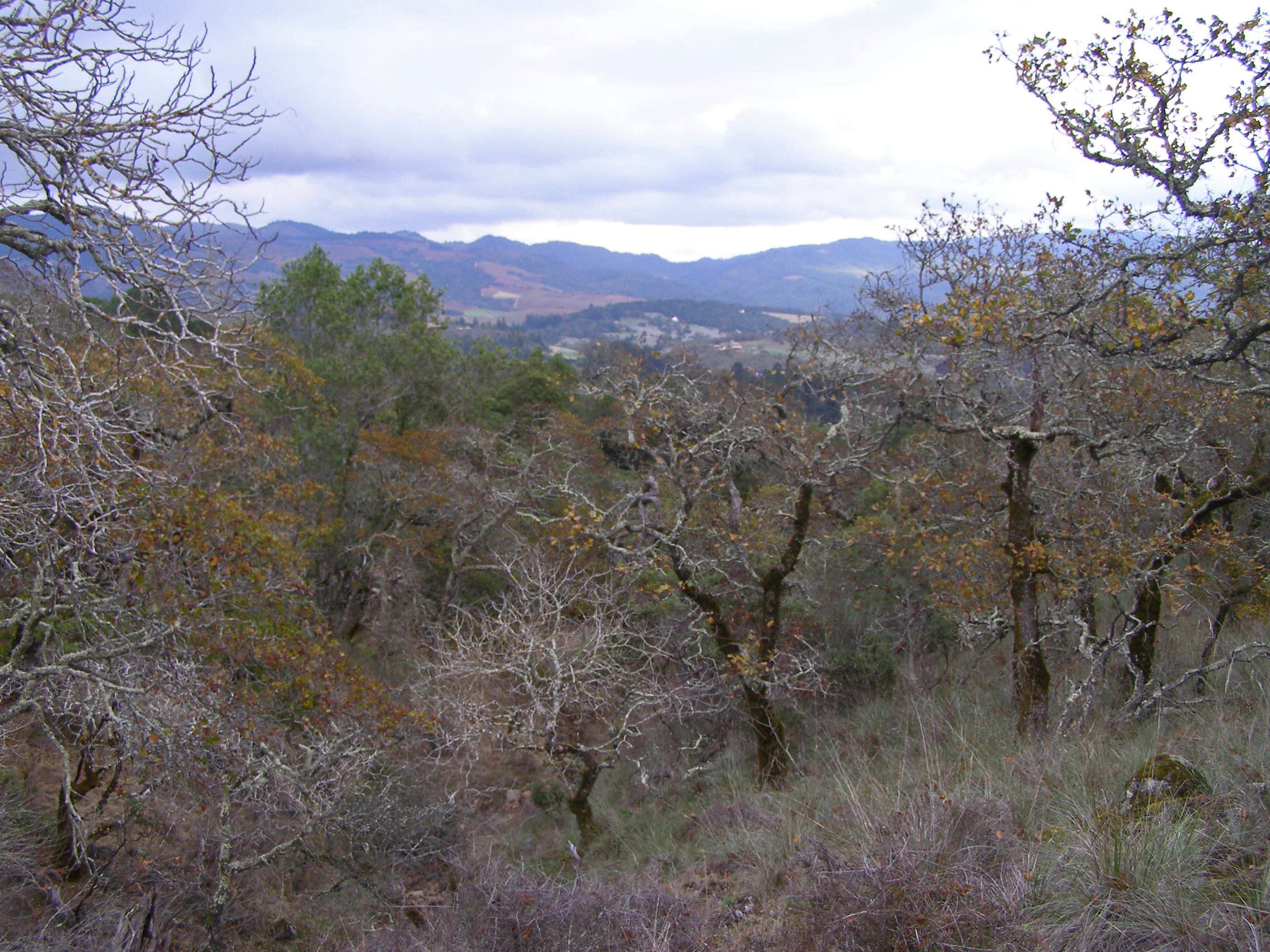
- Headwaters area of Yulupa Creek in the northern Sonoma Mountains with distant view of Mayacamas Mountains.

Location
- Country: United States
- State: California
- Region: Sonoma County
- City: Santa Rosa, California

Physical characteristics
- Source: Bennett Mountain
  - location: 3 mi (5 km) west of Kenwood, California
  - coordinates: 38°23′59″N 122°35′39″W
  - elevation: 1,080 ft (330 m)
- Mouth: Sonoma Creek
  - location: 2 mi (3 km) northwest of Glen Ellen, California
  - coordinates: 38°22′45″N 122°33′10″W
  - elevation: 295 ft (90 m)
- Length: 2.8 mi (4.5 km)
- Basin size: 5 sq mi (13 km^{2})

Yulupa Creek is a 2.8-mile-long (4.5 km) southeast-flowing perennial stream that rises on the southeastern flanks of the northern Sonoma Mountains in Sonoma County, California, United States. This creek, which drains the eastern slopes of Bennett Mountain, is a tributary to Sonoma Creek, which in turn discharges to San Pablo Bay. Yulupa Avenue in Santa Rosa is presumably named after this creek.

== Course ==
Yulupa Creek rises in the Sonoma Mountains, on the southwestern edge of Annadel State Park near Bennett Ridge Road. It descends initially to the southeast. After about 2 miles (3 km) it meets Bennett Valley Road, which it follows eastward to Warm Springs Road, where it discharges into Sonoma Creek.

== Watershed ==
The Yulupa Creek watershed comprises an area of approximately five square miles, and is considered a viable steelhead, Oncorhynchus mykiss, spawning habitat; stream surveys conducted from 1966 to 1986 indicated significant, but declining populations of anadromous fish. NOAA fisheries has designated the Yulupa Creek watershed as "Critical Habitat" for Oncorhychus mykiss as well as O. tshawytscha (Chinook Salmon) as of 2004.

Land use in this watershed consists of Annadel State Park usage and very low density rural single family residential development, much of which is upmarket housing stock. From the higher headwater elevations, there are expansive views of Hood Mountain and the southern Mayacamas Mountains can be seen to the north; Sonoma Valley and distantly San Francisco to the south; and Sonoma Mountain to the southwest. The area designation of most of this watershed is Kenwood, California, an unincorporated area known for its viticulture, although only a small fraction of the Yulupa Creek watershed is planted to grapes.

== Flora and fauna ==
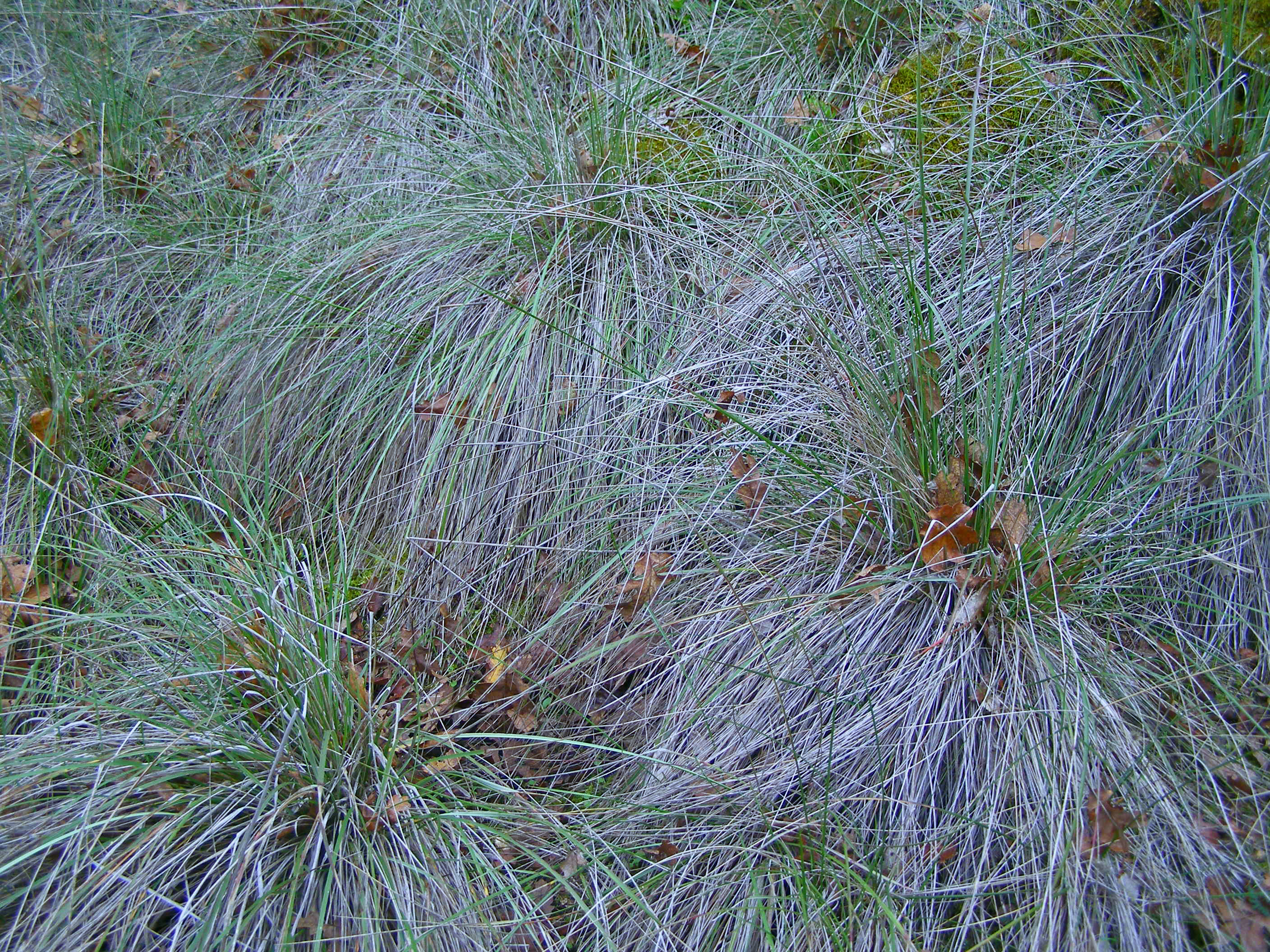
Close-up of bunch grass understory in upper reach of Yulupa Creek within oak woodland.

In addition to known spawning area for O. mykiss, Yulupa Creek has been designated as a high quality riparian zone and an identified habitat of freshwater shrimp. Moreover, the upland watershed area is a California oak woodland, much of which is a relatively undisturbed ecosystem with considerable biodiversity. These forested areas have been characterized as some of the best examples of such woodlands. An unusual characteristic of these forests is the high content of undisturbed prehistoric bunch grass understory, testifying to the absence of historic grazing or other agriculture.

Besides the riparian habitat, plant communities include California oak woodland, Douglas fir forest, chaparral, grassland and marsh. The dominant plant community is the oak woodland, which has a canopy of coast live oak, Garry oak, black oak, Pacific madrone, bigleaf maple and California laurel. Occasionally in the vicinity of drainage swales and creeks, canyon live oak is found. In the oak woodlands, the dominant understory plants are native bunch grass, toyon, blackberry, western poison-oak and in drier patches coyote brush. Common animals observed include black-tailed deer, gray squirrel, raccoon, skunk and opossum. Less frequently bobcat and mountain lion are seen. There is abundant birdlife including the scrub jay, Steller's jay, acorn woodpecker, black phoebe and junco. A number of amphibians occur near the creek and its tributary elements, including the rough skinned newt, Taricha granulosa.

== Geology ==
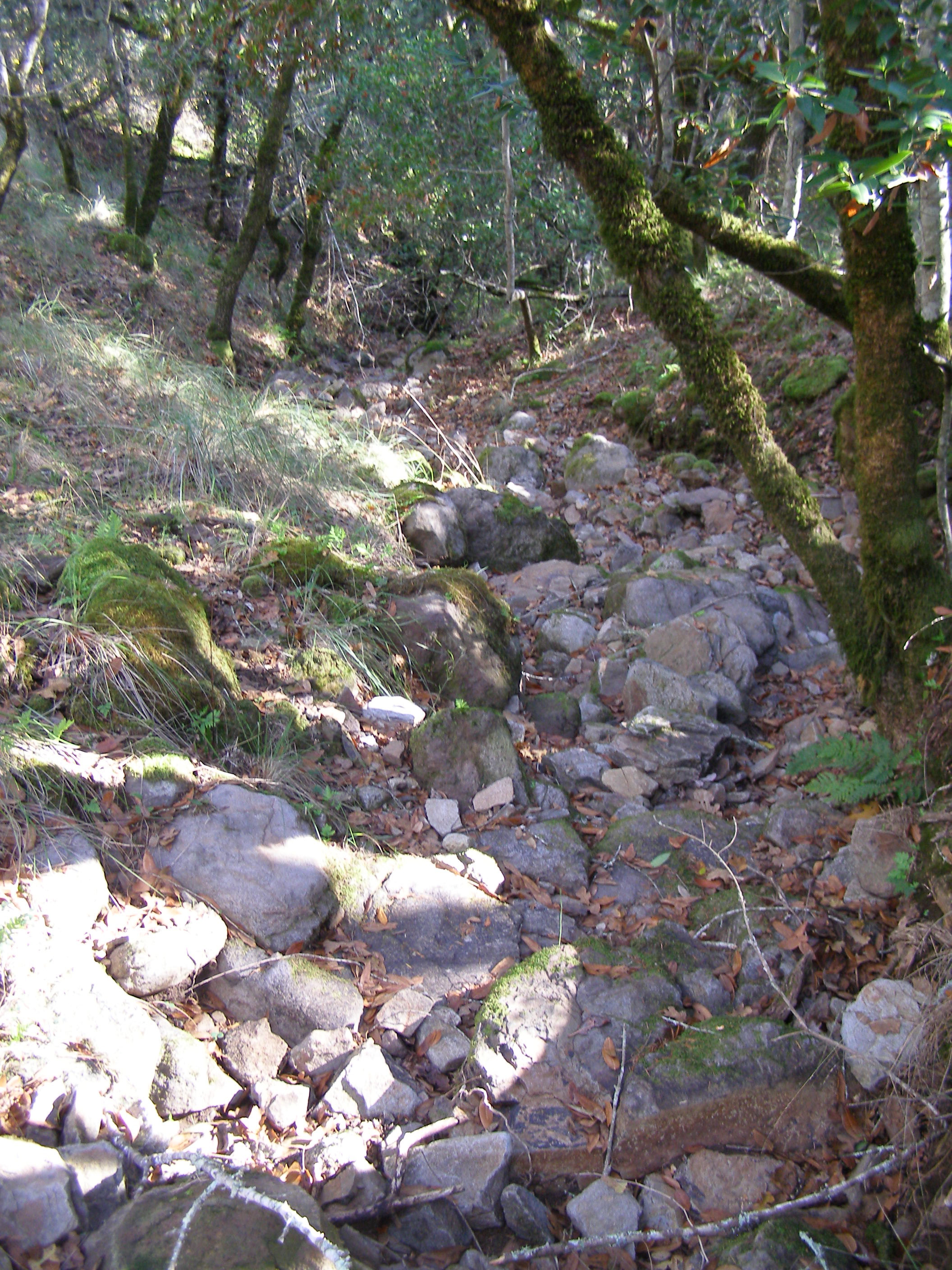
Autumn view of dry tributary in headwaters area

Many of Yulupa Creek's high headwater tributaries are dry in the summer, since rainfall is highly seasonal, with most of the approximately 30 in (76 cm) of annual precipitation occurring between the months of October and April: however, Ledson Marsh retains some smaller pools of water throughout most of the year. Ledson Marsh has a southern outlet to the north fork of Yulupa Creek.

The Yulupa Creek watershed was below the Pacific Ocean floor as recently as the Miocene era, around which time massive uplift and volcanic action formed the massif which comprises the headwaters higher elevations of the watershed of today. Elevations within the drainage basin of Yulupa Creek range from about 430 to 1,800 feet (130 to 550 meters) above sea level. Sandstone is the dominant rock type, as a remnant of the ancient sea floor. Slopes within the headwaters area commonly range from 15 to 30 percent, and lower reaches have gradients of two to five percent. One of the major soil associations within the upper elevation riparian zone is Goulding cobbly clay loam, which contains roughly 25 percent cobblestones, as well as some basaltic exposures, betraying the volcanic past of the Sonoma Mountains formation. Typical soil depths in the headwater area range from 14 to 20 inches (36 to 51 centimeters). Much of the soil type in the Yulupa Creek riparian zone consists of Laniger loam, with rhyolite outcrops, another relic of the igneous history.

== Bridges ==
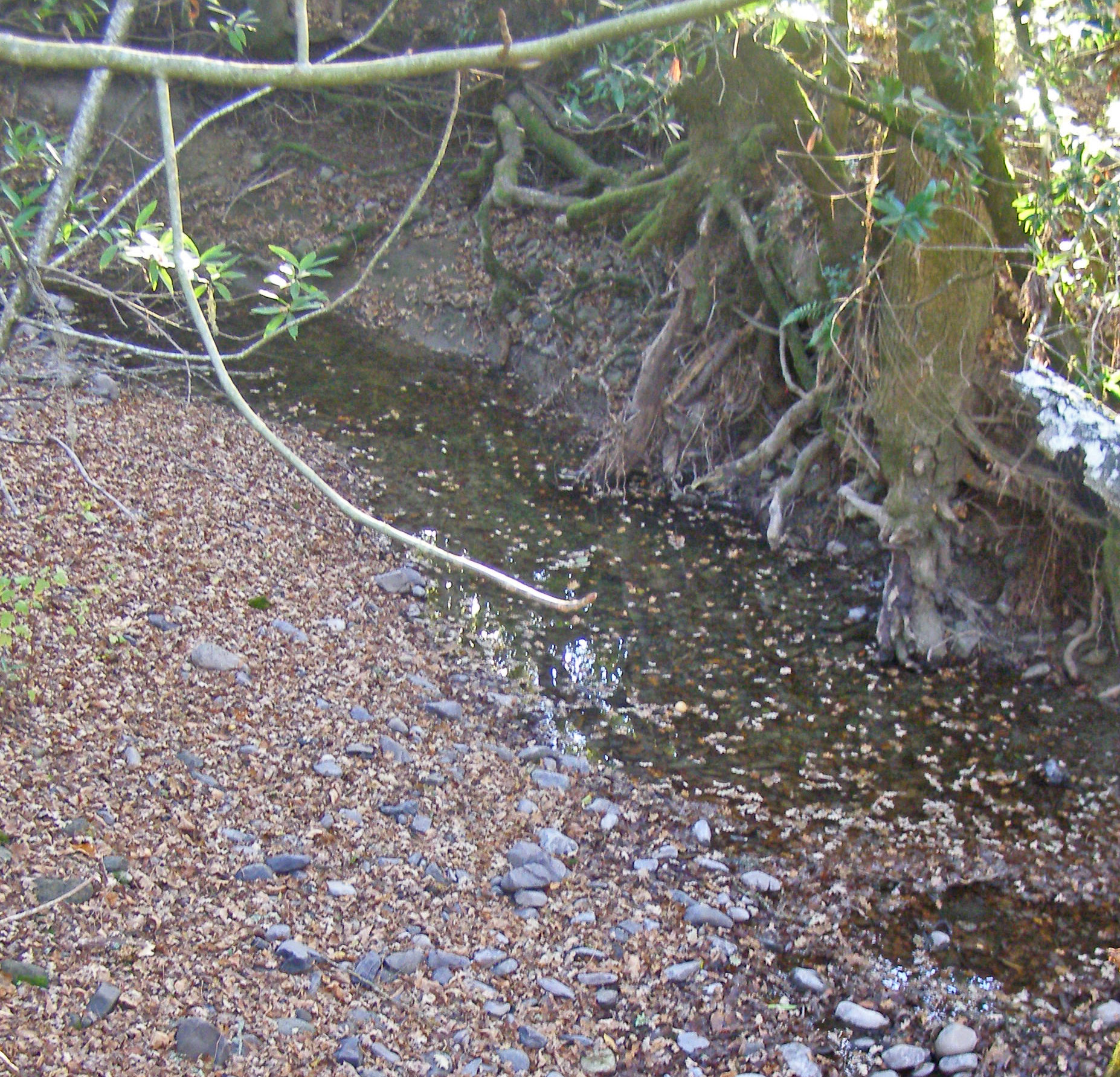
Looking upstream at Yulupa Creek from the Warm Springs Road bridge

There are two significant public roadway bridges across Yulupa Creek. The lowermost traverses the creek on Warm Springs Road, 11.15 miles (17.94 km) north of State Route 116; this seven meter span was constructed in the year 1930 with a concrete culvert design using frame culvert construction. A second crossing farther upstream is the traversal of Bennett Valley Road at a point 0.6 miles (0.97 km) west of Warm Springs Road; this year 1970 bridge is of concrete slab construction, with a span of 33 feet (10 meters).

== See also ==
- Annadel State Park
- Graham Creek
- List of watercourses in the San Francisco Bay Area
- Pomo people
- Taylor Mountain
