= Graham Creek (Sonoma County, California) =

Location
- Country: United States
- State: California
- Region: Sonoma County

Physical characteristics
- Source: Sonoma Mountain
  - location: 3 mi (5 km) west of Glen Ellen, California
  - coordinates: 38°20′44″N 122°34′26″W
  - elevation: 2,160 ft (660 m)
- Mouth: Sonoma Creek
  - location: 1 mi (2 km) northwest of Glen Ellen, California
  - coordinates: 38°22′10″N 122°32′20″W
  - elevation: 282 ft (86 m)

Graham Creek is a 2.9-mile-long (4.7 km) perennial stream in Sonoma County, California, tributary to Sonoma Creek. Graham Creek rises in the northern Sonoma Mountains and flows generally northeasterly down the northeastern flank of Sonoma Mountain. Historically this watercourse was called Wild Water Creek, a name used in the time of author Jack London, some of whose work was inspired by the stream. Steelhead, Oncorhynchus mykiss, have historically entered Graham Creek via Sonoma Creek for spawning. Stream surveys conducted from 1966 to 1986 indicated significant, but declining populations of anadromous fish. The spawning habitat of Graham Creek is considered medium to high value, with both winter and summer sheltering characteristics.

Land uses in the watershed are primarily open space, agriculture and low density residential uses; waste disposal within the watershed contains no municipal collection system and consists totally of septic and lagoon treatment. Most of the watershed is covered with native California oak woodland habitat populated with a variety of riparian and upland flora and fauna. Historical grazing that began in the 19th century caused certain ecological damage, some of which has been reversed by the present time.

== History ==
Archeological surface surveys indicate that the Graham Creek watershed was used as a seasonal hunting and gathering ground by prehistoric Pomo and Wappo people, who traveled extensively to forage and barter. The earliest historical records show the property was within a Spanish Land Grant in the 1860s. By the late 1890s much of the lower watershed had been overgrazed, as noted by Jack London who purchased numerous ranches comprising the lower reaches in the early 20th century. London commented that he wished to reverse the ecological damage in the watershed, which was caused by construction of check dams and animal grazing by the early European pioneers.

== Ecology ==
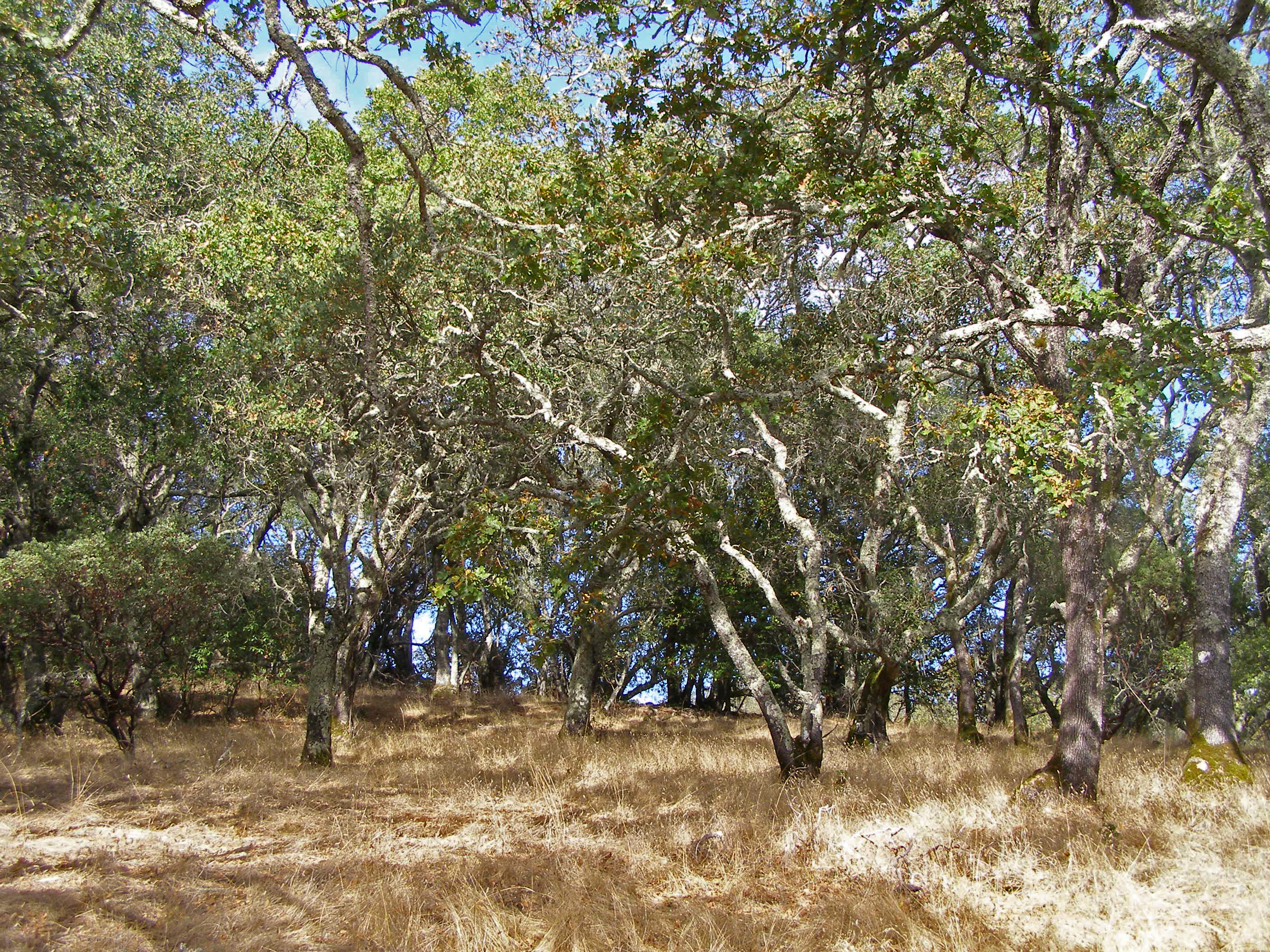
Oak woodland in watershed of middle reach of Graham Creek.

The riparian forests along Graham Creek and its tributaries are quite verdant and have a considerable canopy height, due to the eastern exposure of the relatively steep Sonoma Mountain, which favors forests to outcompete grassland, and whose moist climate nurtures lush tree growth. The most common plant community is the California oak woodland, which has a canopy of coast live oak, Garry oak, Black oak, Pacific Madrone, Bigleaf maple and California laurel. In some of the steeper, cooler riparian zones there are also small groves of Coast redwood, Sequoia sempervirens. In these oak woodlands, the dominant understory plants are toyon, blackberry, western poison-oak and in occasional drier patches some coyote brush. Animals commonly observed include Black-tailed Deer, gray squirrel, raccoon, skunk and opossum. Less frequently bobcat and mountain lion are seen. There is abundant birdlife including the scrub jay, Steller's jay, Acorn woodpecker and junco. Because of the rich soils and mild climate, there are significant sized vineyards at elevations up to 1,700 feet (520 meters) on the northeast flanks of the mountain, positioned like mosaics in a patchwork of mostly oak forest; these grapes contribute to some premium varietal wines, some of which are marketed as premium Sonoma Valley appellations.

Anadromous fish movements in Graham Creek have been studied, although even more extensive research has been conducted of the mainstem Sonoma Creek. These investigations have demonstrated a historical decline in spawning and habitat value for these species, primarily due to sedimentation and secondarily to removal of riparian vegetation since the 19th century. Because of the steep slopes of Graham Creek, the removal of vegetative shading was not as severe as certain other tributaries of Sonoma Creek such as Carriger Creek and Yulupa Creek, where grazing animals could easily wander into the creekbeds of lower reaches. In the case of Graham Creek, relatively steep side canyons and stream gradient commence almost immediately above the confluence with Sonoma Creek.

== See also ==
- Calabazas Creek
- Jack London State Historic Park
- List of watercourses in the San Francisco Bay Area
- Yulupa Creek
