= Sonoma Valley =

Valley landform in California

Coordinates: 38°22′N 122°30′W

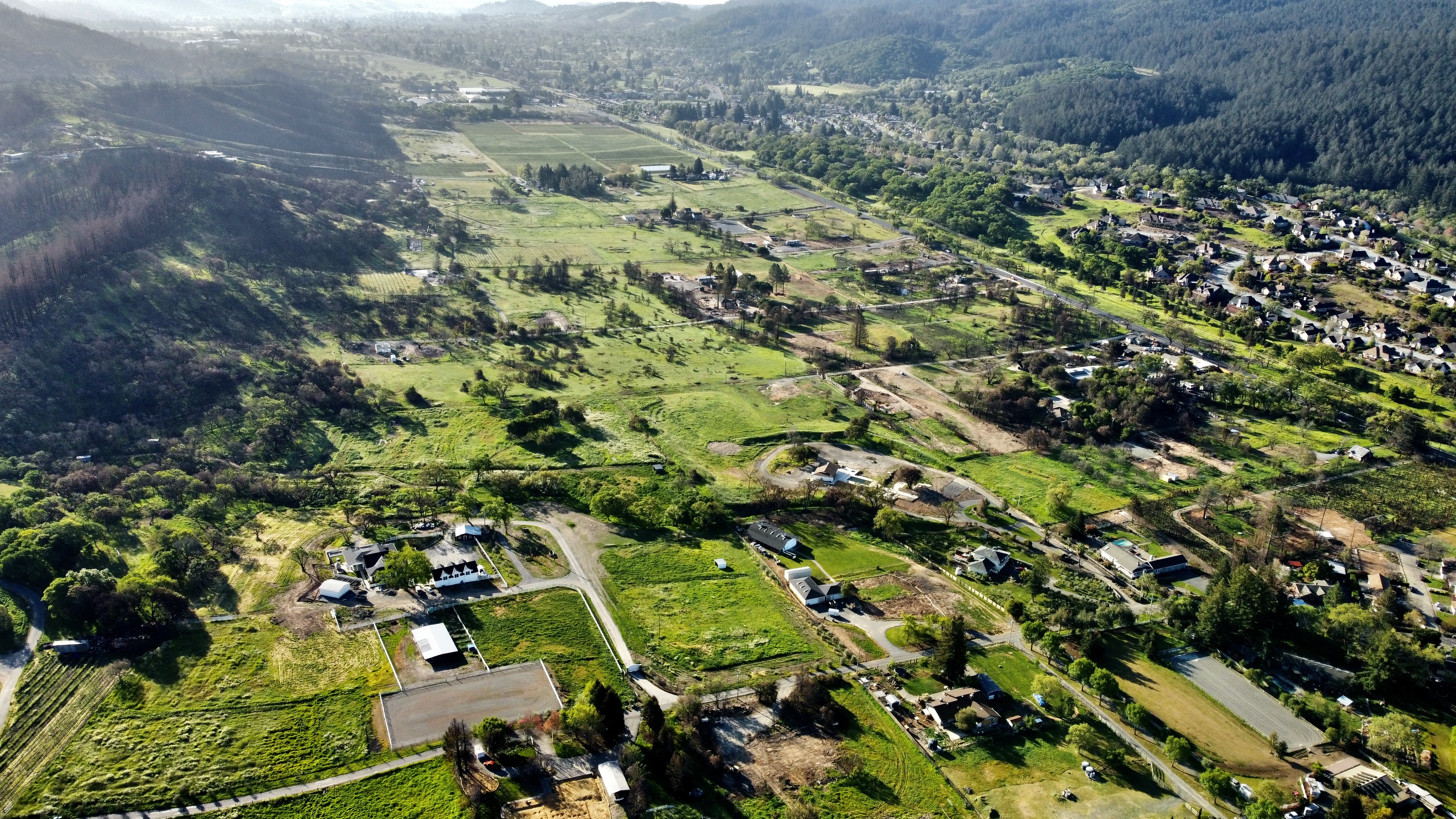
Aerial photo of Sonoma Valley

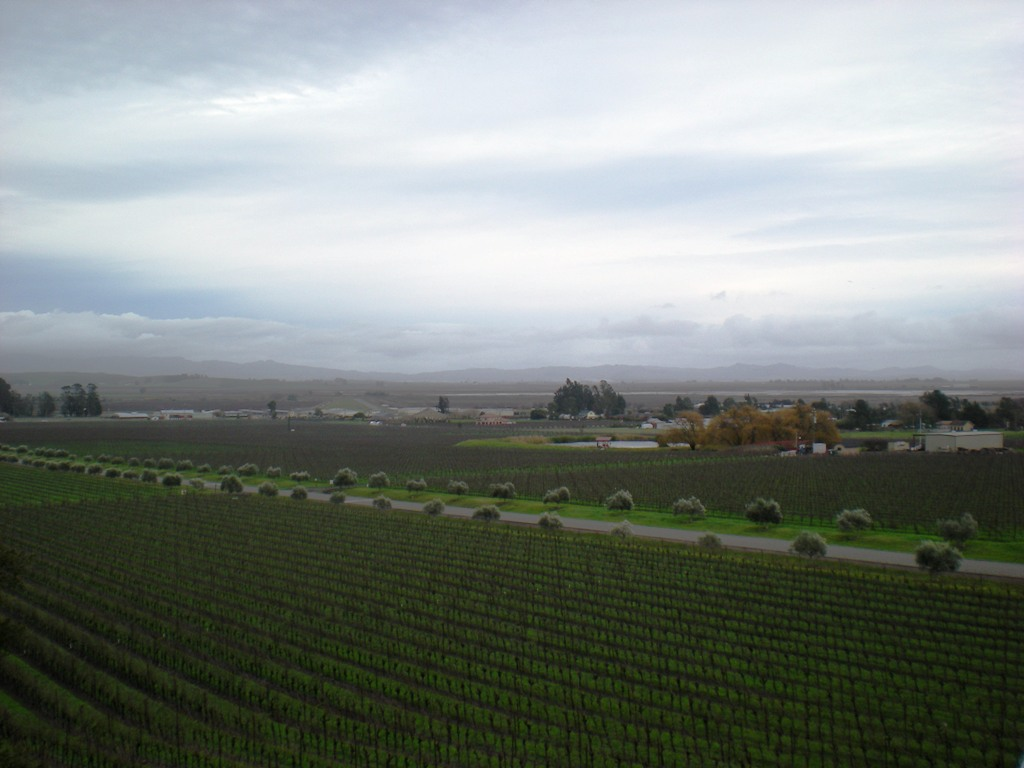
View of the Sonoma Valley

Sonoma Valley is a valley landform located in southeastern Sonoma County, California, in the North Bay region of the San Francisco Bay Area. Known as the birthplace of the California wine industry, the valley is home to some of the earliest vineyards and wineries in the state, some of which survived the phylloxera epidemic of the 1870s and the impact of Prohibition in the early 20th century. As of 2025, the valley's wines are promoted by the Federal designations of Sonoma Valley and its four sub-appellations: Bennett Valley, Los Carneros, Sonoma Mountain and Moon Mountain District American Viticultural Areas (AVA).

Sonoma Valley offers a wide range of year-round festivals and events, including the Sonoma International Film Festival. Points of interest include the Quarryhill Botanic Garden, Mission San Francisco Solano, Jack London State Historic Park, Sonoma State Historic Park and the Blue Wing Inn of 1840.

== Geography ==
The valley is located in southeastern Sonoma County between the Mayacamas Mountains and Sonoma Mountains. It stretches from San Pablo Bay in the south to the city of Santa Rosa in the north. Sonoma Creek flows down the valley to the bay. The area includes the incorporated city of Sonoma and part of the city of Santa Rosa, as well as numerous unincorporated communities, including Kenwood and Glen Ellen near Santa Rosa and, near Sonoma, El Verano, Boyes Hot Springs, Fetters Hot Springs, and Agua Caliente.

=== Local Flora and Fauna ===
Sonoma is filled with a variety of native plant life. The Sonoma area experiences dry heat throughout summer and a wet winter, which helps nurture the growth of uncommon plants in the area. The Checker Lily variant Affinis flourish in the Sonoma region due to the elevation and cool climate. The plant displays a dulled yellowish green color which is ‘mixed’ with brown spotted petals.

== History ==
Once a valley of the coastal Miwok, Pomo and Wintun peoples, called the "Valley of the Moon" in their legends, the valley was selected by the Franciscan order of Spain as the site to build the Mission San Francisco Solano, the northernmost mission in their chain of twenty-one missions built in Alta California. Established in 1823 and named to honor St. Francis Solanus, Mission Solano was the sole California mission established under the rule of a newly independent Mexico. Within two generations of the Spaniards' arrival, however, the indigenous societies of the region were dispossessed of their land and decimated by diseases to which Europeans were resistant. Soon after the Sonoma mission was built, it was secularized by the Mexican government, and, under the orders of Lieutenant, later General Mariano Guadalupe Vallejo, el Pueblo de Sonoma (the town of Sonoma) was laid out in the standard form of a Mexican town, centered around the historic plaza, which is still the town's focal point. Also known as "Valley of the Seven Moons" The raising of the first California Bear Flag and Vallejo's arrest in 1846 by a band of Americans claiming to act on the orders of Col. John C. Fremont was the initial act that founded the Bear Flag Republic. Vallejo later transferred his allegiance with US statehood (1850), and with his amassed land holdings guided the development of the town and dispensed large ranches throughout the valley. California's first wineries were established here, including Buena Vista Winery (1857) and Gundlach Bundschu (1858).

The other communities in the valley, such as Kenwood, Glen Ellen, Schellville, and Boyes Hot Springs, were founded later in the 19th century, some as resorts centered on the geothermic hot springs that still well up from deep within the earth. Boyes Hot Springs and Agua Caliente were popular health retreats for tourists from San Francisco and points beyond until the middle of the 20th century. Today the Sonoma Mission Inn in Boyes Hot Springs remains as a main destination resort, and the wineries, the historic sites, and the area's natural beauty are the main tourist attractions.

In October 2017, Sonoma Valley was badly affected by the Tubbs Fire.

== Origin of the name ==
The phrase "Valley of the Moon" was first recorded in an 1850 report by General Mariano Guadalupe Vallejo to the California Legislature.

According to Jack London, who had a ranch there, the Native American word Sonoma means "valley of the moon". He used it for his book of the same name. But there are several other possible translations for Sonoma (see Sonoma County, California). According to the Miwok tribes that lived in the valley, and the Pomo, it meant "valley of the moon" or "many moons". Settlers may have accidentally translated the words "many moons" into "valley of moons". Miwok legends say that the moon seemingly rose from this valley, or was "nestled" in the valley, or may have even sprung up multiple times in one night.

In the native languages there is also a constantly recurring ending tso-noma, from tso, the earth; and noma, village; hence tsonoma, "earth village". Other sources say Sonoma comes from the Patwin tribes west of the Sacramento River, and their Wintu word for "nose". Per California Place Names, "the name is doubtless derived from a Patwin word for 'nose', which Padre Arroyo (Vocabularies, p. 22) gives as sonom (Suisun)." Spaniards may have found an Indian chief with a prominent protuberance and applied the nickname of Chief Nose to the village and the territory. The name may have applied originally to a nose-shaped geographic feature.

== Geology ==
The Sonoma Valley is part of the Coast Range Physiographic province. Basement rocks that make up the valley at great depth are the Great Valley Sequence shale, sandstone and conglomerate deposited in a continental slope- to abyssal plain environment via turbidite flows. The Cretaceous Great Valley Sequence overlies and contacts the Franciscan Complex along the Coast Range Thrust. The Jurassic-Cretaceous Franciscan Complex includes crumpled, uplifted terranes that have resulted from the subduction of the former oceanic Farallon Plate under the North American continent. During late Miocene-Pliocene time (~10 to ~4 million years) the area was attended by volcanism (Late Miocene Tolay Volcanics and Late Miocene - Pliocene Sonoma Volcanics) which are interbedded with the late Miocene-Pliocene Petaluma Formation. The (~9 to 4 million year old) Petaluma Formation was a fresh-water river system flowing from east to west and through the volcanics.

At that time, volcanic lava flows and river sands and gravels were actively deposited together, hence "interbedded lavas and gravels". The volcanoes may have been similar to island arcs. The Petaluma Formation is found in outcrop from Sears Point to Santa Rosa (through Sonoma Mountain) and as far west as Cotati where it interfingers with a marine sandstone called the Wilson Grove Formation. Gravels in the Petaluma Formation did not come from rocks located in Napa, but have been sourced to mountains east of San Jose, California. This does not mean rivers flowed northward from San Jose to Sonoma; rather, strike-slip movement along the Hayward-Sonoma Valley-Carneros fault system has dislocated present-day Sonoma County north and away from the mountains in San Jose where the basin formed.

The valley is drained by Sonoma Creek, whose headwaters rise in Sugarloaf Ridge State Park and discharge into the San Pablo Bay at the Napa Sonoma Marsh. Some of the principal tributaries to Sonoma Creek are Yulupa Creek, Graham Creek, Calabazas Creek, Bear Creek, Schell Creek and Carriger Creek.

=== Hydrogeology ===
In spring 2006, the United States Geological Survey in conjunction with the Sonoma County Water Agency completed a comprehensive basin-wide groundwater study to characterize groundwater resources in the Sonoma Valley. The report can be obtained on the USGS publications website. Currently, a Basin Advisory Panel, composed of stakeholders from agriculture, environmental groups, domestic well owners, municipalities and government is working to develop a groundwater management plan to protect groundwater resources in the valley.

== Points of interest ==
- Quarryhill Botanic Garden, a research botanical garden housing one of the largest collections of temperate Asian plants in North America. Quarryhill is open to the public.
- Mission San Francisco Solano was the 21st, last and northernmost mission in Alta California.
- Jack London State Historic Park also known as Jack London Home and Ranch, is a California State Historic Park near Glen Ellen, California, United States, situated on the eastern slope of Sonoma Mountain.
- Sonoma State Historic Park is a state park located in the center of Sonoma, California. The park consists of six sites: the Mission San Francisco Solano, the Presidio of Sonoma or Sonoma Barracks, the Toscano Hotel, the Blue Wing Inn, and La Casa Grande and Lachryma Montis.
- Sonoma Creek is a 33.4-mile-long (53.8 km) stream in northern California.
- Wine Country is an area of Northern California in the United States known world-wide as a premium wine-growing region.
- Sonoma Plaza, the town square of Sonoma, is on the National Register of Historic Places.
- Blue Wing Inn of 1840, where notable guests, according to local tradition, included John C. Frémont, U. S. Grant, Governor Pío Pico, Kit Carson, Fighting Joe Hooker, William T. Sherman, Phil Sheridan, and members of the Bear Flag Party.
- General Mariano Guadalupe Vallejo Home: Official residence of the last Spanish governor.
- Presidio of Sonoma adobe
- Toscano Hotel
- Swiss Hotel, Adobe structure and original home of Vallejo's brother, located on 'The Square' (see link below)
- Sebastiani Theatre, a historical theatre built in 1933 by Samuele Sebastiani as a movie house.
- Sonoma TrainTown Railroad, miniature amusement park
- Depot Park
- Sonoma Valley Visitors Bureau, located on the Plaza next to City Hall.

== See also ==
- Category:Wineries in Sonoma County, California
- Sonoma Valley Film Festival
- Sonoma Raceway
- Valley of the Moon
