= Sonoma Creek =

Stream in Sonoma County, California

Sonoma Creek Spanish: Estero de Sonoma
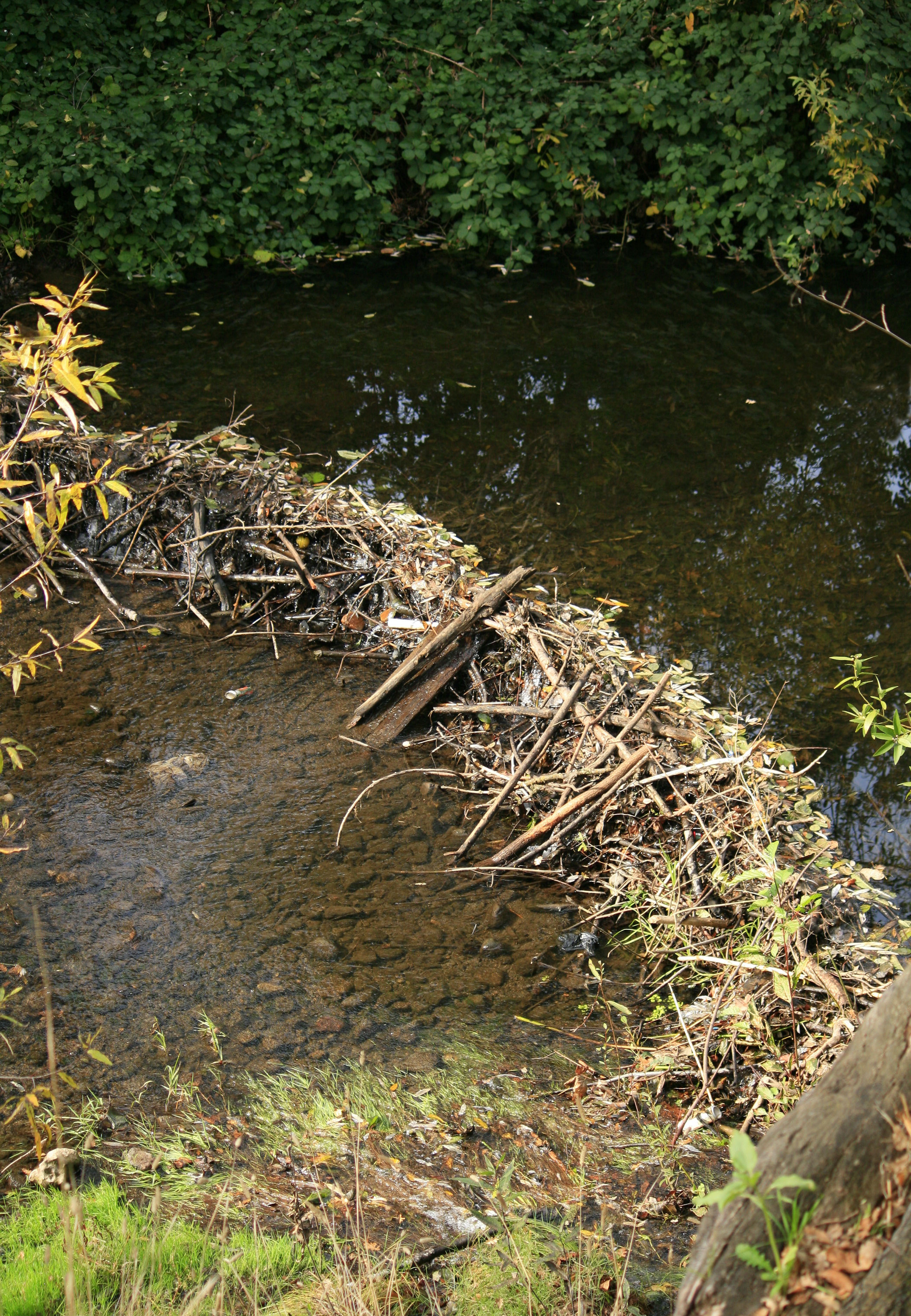
- Beaver dam on Sonoma Creek at Maxwell Farms Regional Park in Sonoma, California, 2009

- Location of the mouth of Sonoma Creek in California

Location
- Country: United States
- State: California
- Region: Sonoma and Napa counties
- Cities: Kenwood, Glen Ellen, El Verano, Sonoma

Physical characteristics
- Source: Bald Mountain
  - location: 4 mi (6 km) southwest of St. Helena, California
  - coordinates: 38°27′23″N 122°30′25″W
  - elevation: 2,480 ft (760 m)
- Mouth: San Pablo Bay
  - location: 11 mi (18 km) west of Vallejo, California
  - coordinates: 38°9′2″N 122°24′13″W
  - elevation: 0 ft (0 m)
- Basin size: 170 sq mi (440 km^{2})

Basin features
- Tributaries
  - left: Calabazas Creek, Schell Creek
  - right: Yulupa Creek, Asbury Creek, Dowdall Creek, Fowler Creek, Graham Creek, Bear Creek

Sonoma Creek is a 33.4-mile-long (53.8 km) stream in northern California. It is one of two principal drainages of southern Sonoma County, California, with headwaters rising in the rugged hills of Sugarloaf Ridge State Park and discharging to San Pablo Bay, the northern arm of San Francisco Bay. The watershed drained by Sonoma Creek is roughly equivalent to the wine region of Sonoma Valley, an area of about 170 square miles (440 km^{2}). The State of California has designated the Sonoma Creek watershed as a “Critical Coastal Water Resource”. To the east of this generally rectangular watershed is the Napa River watershed, and to the west are the Petaluma River and Tolay Creek watersheds.

This south flowing river drains the western slopes of the Mayacamas Range, the southern slopes of Annadel State Park and the eastern slopes of the Sonoma Mountains with intermittent winter flows in the higher tributary reaches. As the tributaries and headwaters reach the valley floor, a perennial stream cuts through scenic and valuable vineyards of Kenwood. Sonoma Creek veers west at Kenwood and cuts a gorge running parallel to Warm Springs Road, where it turns south to historic Glen Ellen, passing within one mile (1.6 kilometers) of Jack London State Historic Park and the Wolf House and thence southward paralleling Arnold Drive. In the city of Sonoma it is an urban creek which emerges into agricultural areas to the south. Finally, Sonoma Creek discharges to the vast Napa-Sonoma Marsh at the northern tip of San Pablo Bay. Principal tributaries to the creek include Yulupa Creek, Graham Creek, Calabazas Creek, Bear Creek, Schell Creek, and Fowler Creek.

== Headwaters ==
Headwaters rise on the west facing slopes of the inner coast southern Mayacamas Mountains, where the highest peaks are Hood Mountain, elevation 2750 feet (833 m) and Bald Mountain, elevation 2729 feet (826 m), each of which has views of the Pacific Ocean and the Sierra Nevada range. The headwaters cut through gorge and meadow of Sugarloaf Ridge State Park, which boasts 25 miles (40 kilometers) of self-guided trails and the Robert Ferguson Observatory. There is also a 25-foot (eight meter) high waterfall, present only when fed by the winter rains but can persist until late June for high rainfall years such as 2006. In the 100 foot (30 m) deep gorge into which the waterfall spills is a moist mixed forest habitat including California bay laurel, coast redwood, Douglas fir, big leaf maple, cherry holly, coffeeberry, and even tanbark oak. The understory features abundant ferns and boulder laden mosses. A prominent landform in this upper reach created by Sonoma Creek is Adobe Canyon. Locally part of this upper reach flow is sometimes called Adobe Creek. Tributaries near the headwaters include Mount Hood Creek and Graywood Creek.

== Ecology ==
A diversity of aquatic and terrestrial organisms populate Sonoma Creek and its riparian zone. Winter-run Chinook salmon (Oncorhynchus tsawytscha), Delta smelt (Hypomesus transpacificus) and steelhead (Oncorhynchus mykiss) are the most prominent fishes. Anadromous fish movements in Sonoma Creek have been studied extensively not only in the mainstem Sonoma Creek, but in some of the tributaries. These investigations have demonstrated a historical decline in spawning and habitat value for these species, primarily due to sedimentation and secondarily to removal of riparian vegetation since the 1800s.

A variety of salamanders, snakes and frogs are also present. The federally listed as threatened California red-legged frog is present in the northern reach draining the south slopes of Annadel State Park. Several endangered species (mostly associated with the marshy discharge area) present include California clapper rail (Rallus longirostris), California black rail (Laterallus jamaicensis), California brown pelican (Pelicanus occidentalis), California freshwater shrimp (Syncaris pacifica), salt marsh harvest mouse (Reithrodontomys raviventris ), Suisun shrew (Sorex ornatus sinuosus), Sacramento splittail (Pogonichtys macrolepidotus). The above are endangered species with the exception of the splittail, steelhead and black rail, which species are federally designated as threatened.

California golden beaver ("Castor canadensis subauratus") were historically abundant along Sonoma Creek but were trapped out in the California Fur Rush of the late eighteenth and early nineteenth centuries. In 1828 fur trapper Michel La Framboise travelled from the Bonaventura River to San Francisco and then the missions of San José, San Francisco Solano and San Rafael Arcángel. La Framboise stated that "the Bay of San Francisco abounds in beaver", and that he "made his best hunt in the vicinity of the missions". The beaver were likely wiped out by the mid-nineteenth century but returned to Sonoma Creek, likely from the Delta, in the 1990s. In 1996 a beaver family developed a taste for merlot grapevine bark in a vineyard beside the creek and were exterminated, leading to civic uproar and a shift to accommodate beaver resettlement. Sonoma Ecology Center executive director Richard Dale reports that although beavers fell trees and dam culverts, on balance they perform nearly "perfect stream restoration," because they cause the creation of deep pools, slowing the flow of flood water and enhancing fishery habitat. New beavers have recolonized Sonoma Creek and are currently located in both Sonoma and Glen Ellen. A "keystone species", the beaver have created habitat that has, in turn, led to the return of river otter ("Lontra canadensis") which have been sighted recently in the beaver pond below the Boyes Boulevard bridge in Boyes Hot Springs.

Upland ecosystems drained include mixed California oak woodland, chaparral and savannah woodland, In these upland reaches one finds plentiful black-tailed deer, coyote, skunk, raccoon, opossum, wild turkey, turkey vulture, red-tailed hawk and occasionally bobcat and mountain lion. Prominent higher elevation trees include: coast live oak, Garry oak, Pacific madrone, California buckeye, Douglas fir, whereas valley oak is prevalent on the Sonoma Valley floor.

== History ==
Up until about 1850, Sonoma Creek was unchanged from its natural state. Adverse erosion and bank cutting were at sustainable levels and did not add enough turbidity to the creek system to discourage aquatic species. Flooding in the downstream reaches did not realize the modern frequencies since all the creek reaches could absorb more excess water from peak rainfall events. The Kenwood area existed in the form of a large marsh effectively blocked by a natural earthen dam from penetrating the course of the creek as it flows west out of Kenwood toward Glen Ellen.

With the advent of more intensive farming of Sonoma Valley in the latter half of the 19th century, the Kenwood Marsh was drained in favor of grazing, vineyards and other agricultural uses. This action removed the largest upstream buffer that assisted flood control in the lower reaches of Sonoma Creek. Consequently, the frequency and severity of modern floods (1960s onward) has been exacerbated by these interventions of humans.

In 1978, Sonoma Creek was named a historic resource by the Sonoma League of Historic Preservation for being "one of the most picturesque sites and valuable natural resources in Sonoma County."

== Water quality ==
Sonoma Creek in Kenwood during the 2021 atmospheric river and bomb cyclone.

The State of California Regional Water Quality Control Board considers the most significant water quality parameters in Sonoma Creek to be: turbidity, pathogens and nitrates. Turbidity is an issue because of historical problems of erosion of stream banks, especially in the presence of ongoing land development in Sonoma Valley. Increased sedimentation has a variety of adverse impacts including direct harm to aquatic organisms and the more specific impact of altering streambed gravels to reduce productivity of spawning habitats; additionally sedimentation of pools decreases the efficacy of anadromous fish summering habitat by increasing critical summer water temperatures in these pools. Pathogens appear to be linked to septic tank or leach field failures in some of the rural reaches, particularly in the upper valley sections. Nitrates enter the stream system from excess fertilizers applied to land uses in the drainage basin and may also be present in septic wastes improperly entering the creek. Sediment and nitrates may also enter the stream through urban stormwater runoff in the city of Sonoma reach.

== Wine production ==
Because Sonoma Creek is the sole drainage flow of the Sonoma Valley Wine Country, it is a vital resource for aquifer recharge. Proportionally a greater percent of Sonoma Creek feeds recharge than its neighbors, the Napa and Petaluma Rivers. This outcome derives from the presence of pervious valley floor alluvial soils and the gentle stream gradients along the valley floor, where most of the reaches occur. The valley itself is part of the Franciscan Complex, which includes crumpled, uplifted terranes that have resulted from the subduction of the former oceanic Farallon Plate under the North American continent. The area is attended by volcanism and sediments, deposited in the lagoons behind its island arcs, which resulted from geological events dating from 140 to 42 million years. Recharge for the Sonoma Valley is critical because local rainfall is only about 29 inches (74 centimeters) per year. Grape growing and wine production require considerable groundwater extraction, and there is controversy over wineries use of annual creeks and waterways.

== Discharge to San Pablo Bay ==
This large marsh area has been reduced considerably from its historic dimensions due to construction of multiple levee systems and encroachment by agriculture and other forms of development. This Napa-Sonoma Marsh has been formed largely by sedimentary deposits over the last two million years. The basement depositional layer is the Alameda group. Higher are Old bay mud and Young bay mud, between which there are intermediate deposits of the Alameda formation, which consists of alluvial and swamp origins. The entire marsh area is considered subject to liquefaction in the case of a major seismic event. The marsh is subject to diurnal tidal variations of approximately 5.5 feet (1.7 m).

Historically the marsh supported an extremely diverse wetlands ecosystem, with a variety of primary productivity plants including pickleweed, eelgrass and giant bulrush (Scirpus californiens). There has also been historically significant fish, mammal, amphibian and avafauna. The marsh is a significant element within the Pacific Flyway providing resting and feeding areas for migratory birds. As of 2006 this ecosystem has been significantly compromised by fill, levee formation, dredging and other development; estimates generally state that 75 percent of the original biological productivity of the marsh has been destroyed. However, it remains a significant habitat and is subject to meaningful wetland restoration activity, that is being actively evaluated as of the 2000–2006 timeframe.

== Recent developments ==
Because of the recognition of impacts of land development and land use practices, which began in the mid-19th century and have continued until 2006, certain actions are being considered by the Board of Supervisors of Sonoma County. Most notably a special parcel tax may be submitted to voters to assess landowners adjacent to Sonoma Creek. These funds could be used in flood control, hydrology modeling studies, stream conservation work, including erosion control and wildlife conservation. Other current activities include considerable research in public and private sectors including work by the U.S. Army Corps of Engineers, Sonoma County and various private conservation groups.

Due to overpopulation of Sonoma Valley as well as overly intensive agriculture, groundwater supplies have been drawn down to the point of causing deleterious effects. The U.S. Geological Survey has found in the Carneros region between Sonoma Creek and the Napa Ridge that due to excessive groundwater drawdown, saltwater intrusion is already occurring, rendering water unsuitable for many uses.

== See also ==
- California slender salamander
- List of rivers in California
- List of watercourses in the San Francisco Bay Area
- Arnold Drive Bridge
