= Kenwood, California =

Unincorporated community in California, United States

Kenwood
- census-designated place & unincorporated community
- Location within the state of California
- Coordinates: 38°24′50″N 122°32′46″W
- Country: United States
- State: California
- County: Sonoma

Area
  - Total: 5.167 sq mi (13.382 km^{2})
  - Land: 5.167 sq mi (13.382 km^{2})
  - Water: 0 sq mi (0 km^{2}) 0%
- Elevation: 423 ft (129 m)

Population (2020)
  - Total: 852
  - Density: 165/sq mi (63.7/km^{2})
- Time zone: UTC-8 (PST)
  - Summer (DST): UTC-7 (PDT)
- ZIP codes: 95409/95452
- Area code: 707
- FIPS code: 06-38156
- GNIS feature ID: 226527

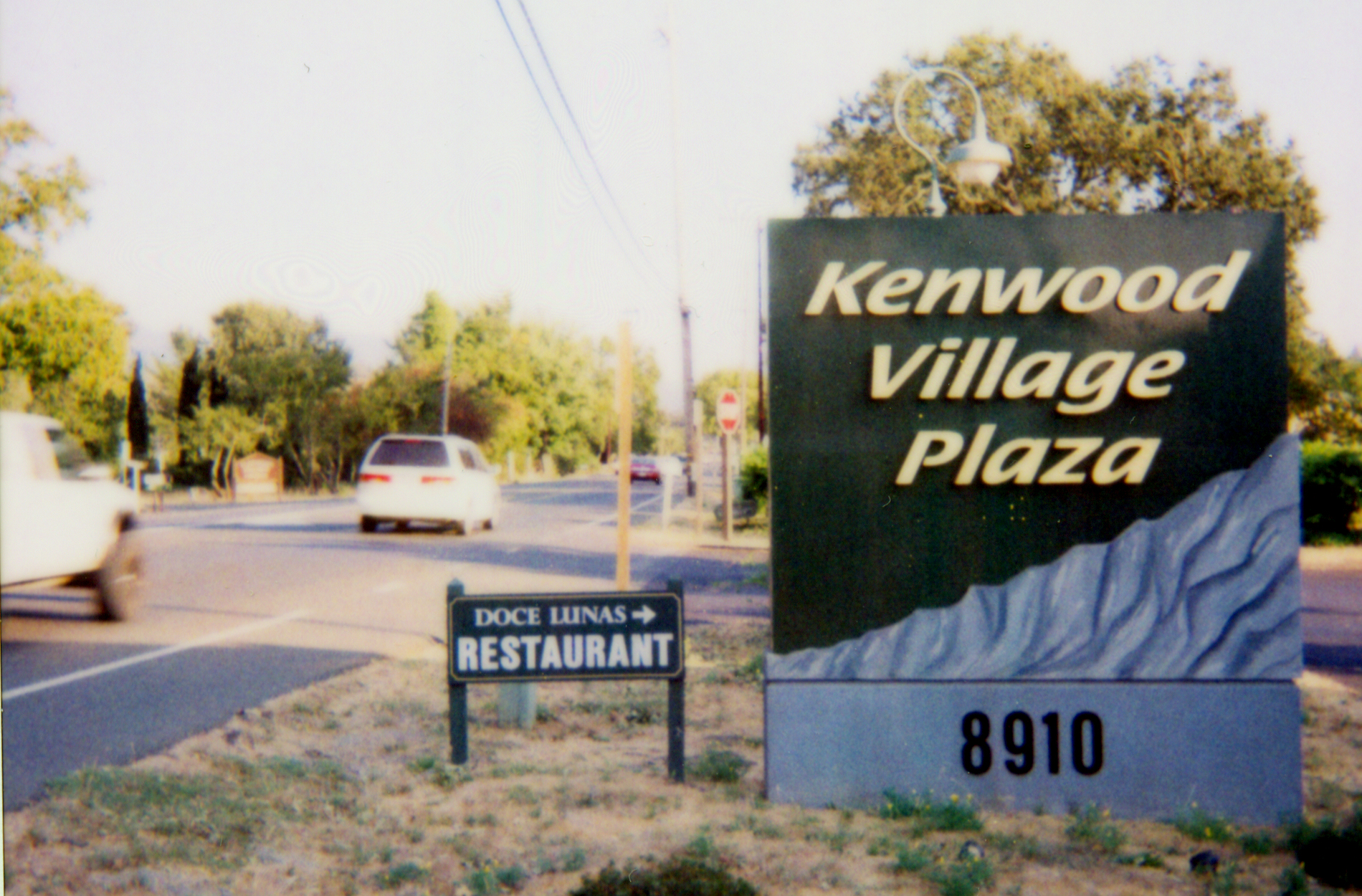
One possible definition of Kenwood's center is this plaza. The post office is located in the plaza.

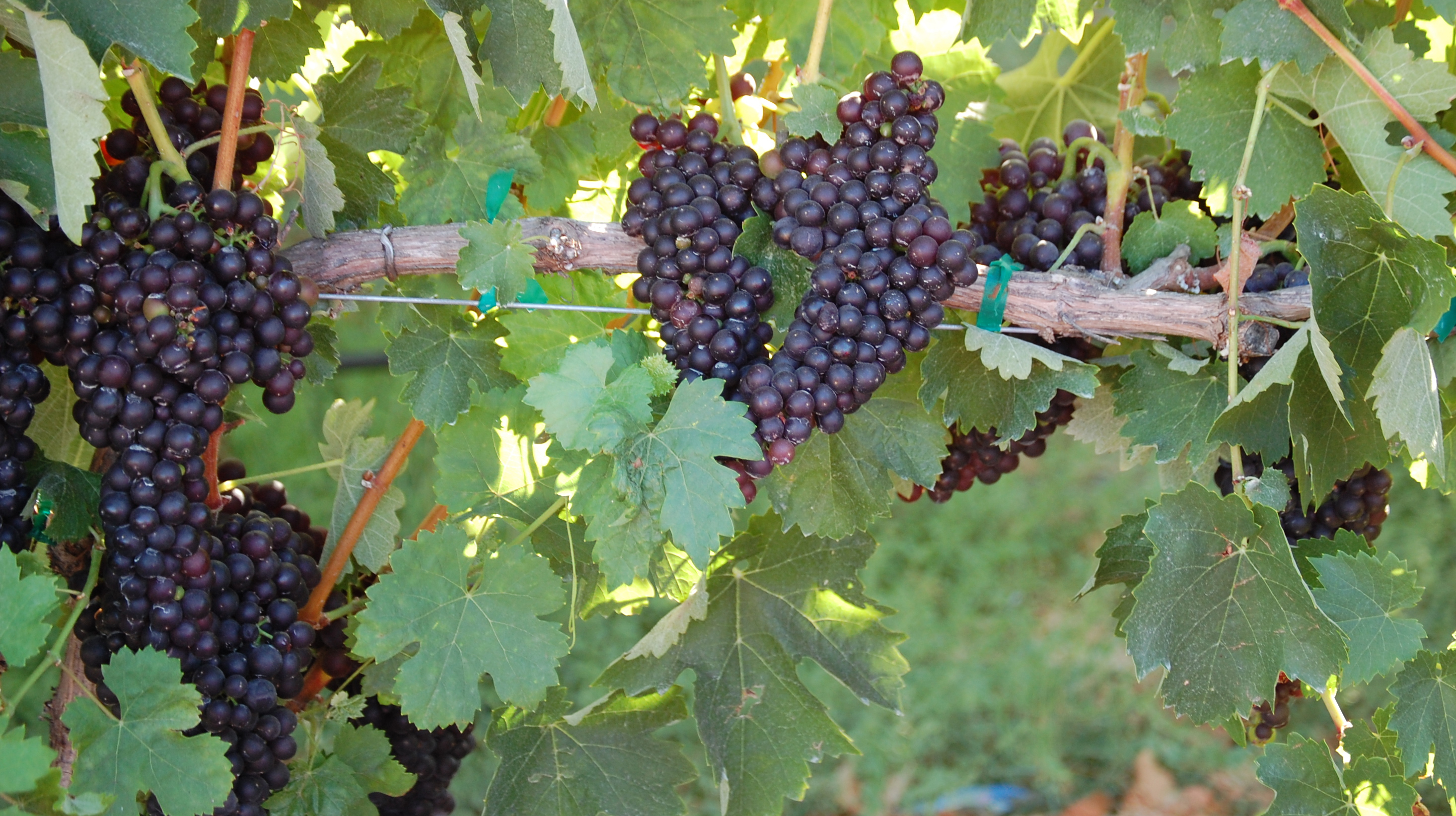
Grapevines growing along State Route 12 in Kenwood

Kenwood is an unincorporated community and census-designated place (CDP) in Sonoma County, California, United States, located on Sonoma Highway (State Route 12) between the cities of Santa Rosa and Sonoma. It lies east of Sonoma Creek in the upper part of Sonoma Valley, a region sometimes called the Valley of the Moon. Bennett Mountain lies west of the town, and Sugarloaf Ridge to the northeast. The population was 852 at the 2020 census.

Kenwood is considered part of the Wine Country. Viticulturally, it lies in the Sonoma Valley AVA. The Kenwood area is known for vineyards and wineries, restaurants, and a European-style resort. An area landmark is the Kunde Estate Winery on Sonoma Highway, which was first planted in 1879.

== History ==
Kenwood is located on the Rancho Los Guilicos Mexican land grant. In 1887, the Sonoma Land & Improvement Company, which owned the property on which the town now sits, laid out lots in anticipation of the railroad which would arrive the following year. The infant community tried on many names: Rohrerville, for one of the owners of the land company; Los Guilicos, and then South Los Guilicos, for the Mexican land grant.

South Los Guilicos Depot on the Santa Rosa and Carquinez Railroad opened in 1887. The First Congregational Church of Los Guilicos was built in 1888. It was relocated from the corner of Los Guilicos and Laurel to its present site in 1893. The parsonage was used for the Kenwood School until construction was completed in 1960. The original name of the church was changed first to Los Guilicos Congregational Church and then to its current name Kenwood Community Church. In 1981, the church was designated Historic Landmark 82 by the County of Sonoma.

A number of townspeople were unhappy, complaining that "Guilicos" was hard to pronounce. Around 1895 a vote was taken to change the name again. One story says that Kenwood won because many of the settlers had come from Kenwood, Illinois. Another traces the choice to the fact that many landowners in the area were from old English families and so were familiar with London's Kenwood House. It is possible that both stories are true, and the name's permanence stemmed from its acceptability to different groups.

Some notable people had ranches in the area, including mining, railroad, newspaper and banking magnate, Thomas Kearns, who was also a U.S. Senator from Utah. It is reported that he entertained President Theodore Roosevelt there at the Kearns Ranch, also known as the William Hood House.

The World Pillow Fight Championships originated in Kenwood in the 1970s. Two local community groups held charitable functions to help raise funds that would make improvements to the town. One of these charitable functions was the World Pillow Fighting Championships. A steel pole was made to span the Los Guilicos Spring Creek, which was then filled with mud and the Pillow Fights became an annual event. The last World Pillow Fight Championships in Kenwood were held in Plaza Park in 2006, and subsequent events have been held around the United States. A return to Sonoma County is planned for 2019.

Ray Flugger founded Flowmaster, Inc. in 1983 while working out of a small barn in Kenwood.

== Demographics ==
Historical population
Census	Pop.	Note	%±
2010	1,028		—
2020	852		−17.1%
U.S. Decennial Census; 1860–1870 1880-1890; 1900 1910 1920; 1930 1940 1950; 1960 1970 1980; 1990 2000 2010; 2020

Kenwood first appeared as a census designated place in the 2010 U.S. census.

=== Racial and ethnic composition ===
Kenwood CDP, California – Racial and ethnic composition Note: the US Census treats Hispanic/Latino as an ethnic category. This table excludes Latinos from the racial categories and assigns them to a separate category. Hispanics/Latinos may be of any race.
Race / Ethnicity (NH = Non-Hispanic)	Pop 2010	Pop 2020	% 2010	% 2020
White alone (NH)	904	671	87.94%	78.76%
Black or African American alone (NH)	1	5	0.10%	0.59%
Native American or Alaska Native alone (NH)	0	1	0.00%	0.12%
Asian alone (NH)	23	13	2.24%	1.53%
Native Hawaiian or Pacific Islander alone (NH)	2	4	0.19%	0.47%
Other race alone (NH)	1	7	0.10%	0.82%
Mixed race or Multiracial (NH)	18	64	1.75%	7.51%
Hispanic or Latino (any race)	79	87	7.68%	10.21%
Total	1,028	852	100.00%	100.00%

=== 2020 census ===
The 2020 United States census reported that Kenwood had a population of 852. The population density was 164.9 inhabitants per square mile (63.7/km^{2}). The racial makeup of Kenwood was 685 (80.4%) White, 8 (0.8%) African American, 4 (0.5%) Native American, 14 (1.6%) Asian, 4 (0.5%) Pacific Islander, 37 (4.3%) from other races, and 101 (11.9%) from two or more races. Hispanic or Latino of any race were 87 persons (10.2%).

The census reported that 825 people (96.8% of the population) lived in households, 9 (1.1%) lived in non-institutionalized group quarters, and 18 (2.1%) were institutionalized.

There were 385 households, out of which 61 (15.8%) had children under the age of 18 living in them, 202 (52.5%) were married-couple households, 20 (5.2%) were cohabiting couple households, 106 (27.5%) had a female householder with no partner present, and 57 (14.8%) had a male householder with no partner present. 119 households (30.9%) were one person, and 74 (19.2%) were one person aged 65 or older. The average household size was 2.14. There were 244 families (63.4% of all households).

The age distribution was 102 people (12.0%) under the age of 18, 29 people (3.4%) aged 18 to 24, 142 people (16.7%) aged 25 to 44, 270 people (31.7%) aged 45 to 64, and 309 people (36.3%) who were 65 years of age or older. The median age was 60.3 years. For every 100 females, there were 98.1 males.

There were 475 housing units at an average density of 91.9 units per square mile (35.5 units/km^{2}), of which 385 (81.1%) were occupied. Of these, 328 (85.2%) were owner-occupied, and 57 (14.8%) were occupied by renters.

== Parks ==
Kenwood Plaza Park, located two blocks south of State Route 12 at 200 Warm Springs Road and Shaw Park, which is located at 100 Shaw Ave also off State Route 12. Both are managed by the Sonoma County Regional Parks Department.

Annadel State Park lies to the west, Hood Mountain Regional Park lies to the north, and Sugarloaf Ridge State Park lies to the northeast. Further to the south lies Jack London State Historic Park.

== Utilities ==
Western California Telephone Company provided telephone service to Kenwood, Los Gatos, Morgan Hill and Novato. In the 1970s it was acquired by General Telephone, (later GTE and then Verizon). These four areas are now all served by Verizon. Part of Oakmont, a large residential development within the city limits of Santa Rosa, is actually inside the Verizon service area, causing that portion to have Kenwood prefixes. The area code for Kenwood is 707.

== Geography ==
According to the United States Census Bureau, the CDP covers an area of 5.2 square miles (13 km^{2}), all land.

=== Climate ===
Under the Köppen Climate Classification climate classification, "dry-summer subtropical" climates are often referred to as "Mediterranean". This climate zone has an average temperature above 10 °C (50 °F) in the warmest months, and an average in the coldest between 18 and −3 °C (64 and 27 °F). Summers tend to be dry with less than one-third that of the wettest winter month, and with less than 30 mm (1.2 in) of precipitation in a summer month.

Climate data for Kenwood, CA
Month	Jan	Feb	Mar	Apr	May	Jun	Jul	Aug	Sep	Oct	Nov	Dec	Year
Mean daily maximum °C (°F)	13 (56)	16 (61)	18 (65)	22 (71)	26 (78)	29 (85)	32 (90)	32 (89)	29 (85)	25 (77)	19 (66)	14 (57)	23 (74)
Mean daily minimum °C (°F)	2 (36)	4 (40)	4 (40)	6 (43)	8 (47)	10 (50)	11 (52)	11 (51)	9 (49)	7 (45)	4 (40)	3 (37)	7 (44)
Average precipitation mm (inches)	190 (7.6)	170 (6.5)	110 (4.3)	53 (2.1)	20 (0.8)	5.1 (0.2)	0 (0)	2.5 (0.1)	7.6 (0.3)	43 (1.7)	99 (3.9)	180 (6.9)	880 (34.6)
Source: Weatherbase

== Wineries ==
- Deerfield Ranch Winery
- Kenwood Vineyards
- Kunde Family
- Chateau St Jean Winery
- Mayo Reserve Room
- Ledson Winery & Vineyards
- Paradise Ridge Winery
- Ty Caton Vineyards
- Landmark Vineyards
- Blackstone Winery Archived 2010-01-23 at the Wayback Machine
- B Wise Vineyards
- Family Wineries Kenwood
- Kenwood Vineyards
- NakedWines.com Wine Studio and Tasting Lounge
- Muscardini Cellars

== Education ==
The school districts are Kenwood Elementary School District and Santa Rosa High School District.

== Notable people ==
- Valerie K. Brown, former member of the California State Assembly and Sonoma County Board of Supervisors
- Dan Dion, photographer and comedy producer
- Paul Otellini, businessman

== See also ==
- North Bay (San Francisco Bay Area)
