= Sugarloaf Ridge State Park =

State park in California, United States

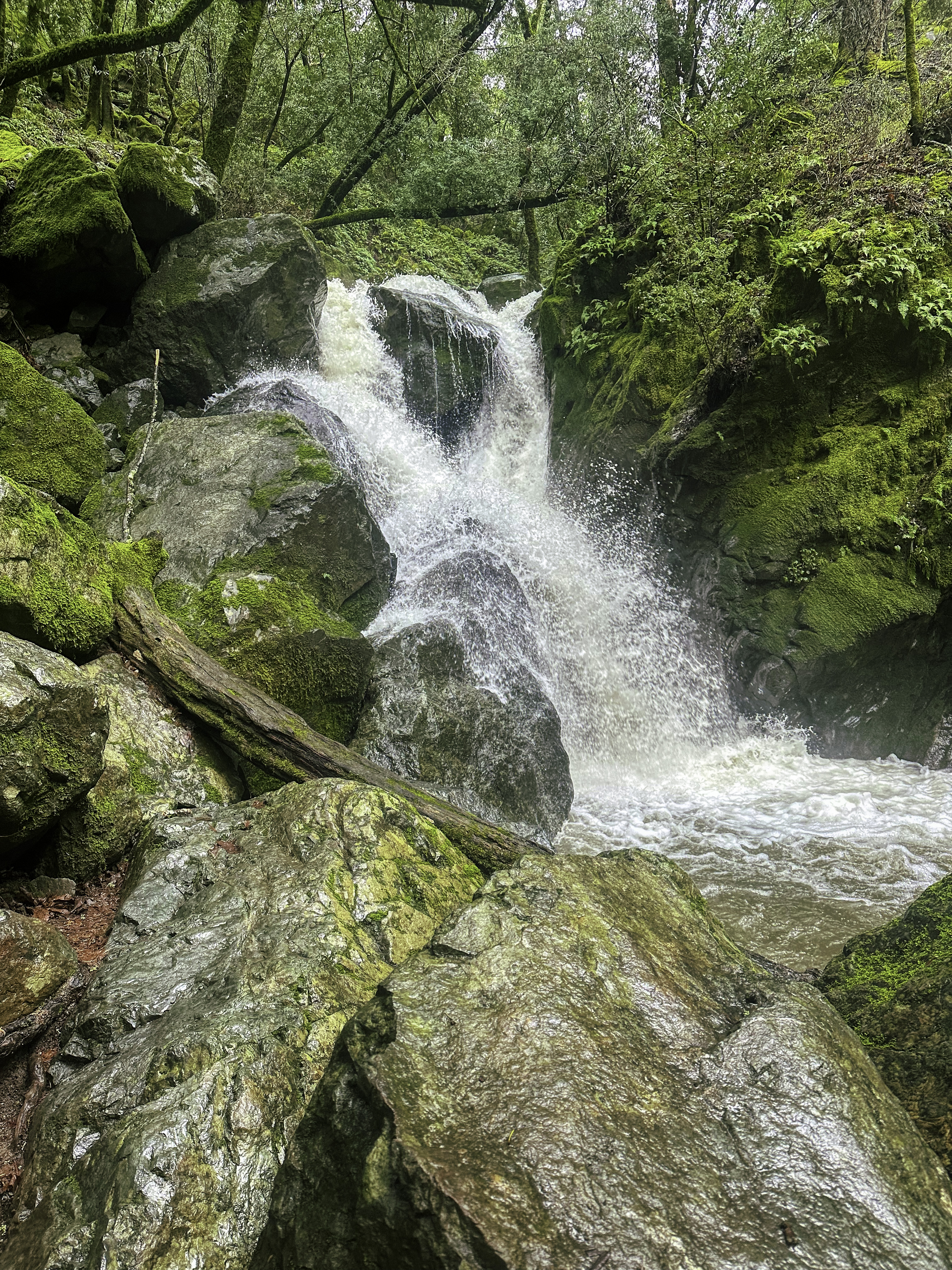
- Waterfall in the park

- Location within California
- Location: Sonoma and Napa counties, California, U.S.
- Nearest city: Santa Rosa, California
- Coordinates: 38°26′42″N 122°30′08″W
- Area: 4,020 acres (1,630 ha)
- Operator: Team Sugarloaf

Sugarloaf Ridge State Park is a state park in Northern California, United States. Located in the Mayacamas Mountains northeast of Kenwood, the park straddles the boundary between Sonoma and Napa counties. The park contains the 2,729-foot (832 m) Bald Mountain and the headwaters of Sonoma Creek including a 25-foot (8 m) tall seasonal waterfall. The park is also home to the volunteer-run Robert Ferguson Observatory. Camping, picnicking, horseback riding, mountain biking, stargazing, fishing and hiking are common attractions of Sugarloaf. The park boasts 25 miles of trails with trails ranging from less than a mile to 8.8 miles, and elevation gains reaching 2,500 feet.

The ridge has two main peaks, the southern one being 1,939 feet (591 m) above sea level and northern one being 2,265 feet (690 m). The southern peak contains an extensive microwave antenna. The higher northern peak has two panels identifying geographic features in view. There is also a bench.

Sugarloaf Ridge was one of the first parks to close under the California State Parks plan to close up to 70 of its 278 parks due to budget cuts. The closures were deemed necessary to achieve an $11 million reduction in the next fiscal year 2011/12, that amount increasing to $22 million in the following fiscal year 2012/13. The park was reopened by Team Sugarloaf in June 2012 to restore access to camping and hiking trails. Team Sugarloaf continues to operate the park.

The park's official address is 2605 Adobe Canyon Road, Kenwood, CA 95452.

== History ==
The Onasáti (Wappo) were the first known inhabitants of the region, settling on along the Sonoma Creek 1500 years ago. They relied on various resources of the region especially acorns and berries, and are known for their farming and basketry abilities. Spaniards attempted to take over the area in 1823, failing. Later, the cholera epidemic dwindled the numbers of the Wappos, who were ultimately relocated to Indian reservations by the American government.

In the 1870s farming increased in the Sugarloaf region. Business owners in town began hiring "gentlemen farmers" to manage their ranches along the Sugarloaf Ridge while the business owners remained in the town. Some even made livings off burning trees of the Sugarloaf region to make and sell charcoal.

In 1920 the California government purchased the property to dam Sonoma Creek for use by the nearby (Eldridge, south of Glen Ellen) Sonoma State Hospital. In 1932 The Sonoma State Home (now called the Sonoma Developmental Center) established a Boy Scout camp on the property named "Camp Butler" in 1932 after the name of the State Hospital Director. The camp was used until the United States joined World War II. Land owners began leasing land for animal grazing in 1942. Finally in 1964, the state of California admitted Sugarloaf as a California State Park.

== Vegetation ==
Sugarloaf Ridge State Park's forests consist of Umbellularia (California Bay Laurel), Douglas firs, big-leaf maple, madrone, coastal redwoods, California buckeye and alder trees as well as an abundance of oaks including live, valley, and mixed oaks. Poison oak and stinging nettles are found along the Sonoma Creek and can be a threat to hikers. Shrubs of the chaparral include manzanita, chamise, California lilac, coyote bush, toyon, and winebush. Sugarloaf experiences a colorful spring with a wide array of wildflowers: California poppies, cream cups, lupines, penstemons, buttercups, peas, shooting stars, trilliums, Indian warriors and mariposa lily. Golden fairy lantern, zigadene, and fritillarias are in certain regions of the enclosure as well. Summer boasts the blossoming of even more flowers including clarkias, scarlet larkspurs, farewell-to-springs, Mariposa lilies, monkey flowers, Indian pinks and tarweeds. Invasive species include yellow starthistle (Centaurea solstitialis) and Italian thistle (Carduus pycnocephalus). At least 400 plants species are found in Sugarloaf Ridge State Park.

== Wildlife ==
Deer, along with gray foxes, bobcats, coyotes, black bears, and mountain lions inhabit the park, as well as numerous racoons and an occasional badger. Turkey vultures can be seen swarming regions of the park as well. Trout are present in the streams and are a common attraction for visitors, especially beginning in late spring to early summer. Chinook salmon and Steelhead have also been recently sighted in Sonoma Creek in the park.

== Bald Mountain ==
As the main attraction for hikers, this peak can be reached by hiking the park's trails. Upon reaching the summit, Mount Saint Helena, Napa Valley, and a distant view of the Sierra Nevada Mountains can be seen. The San Francisco Bay Area, Mt. Diablo, and the Sugarloaf Ridge can be seen when facing the south. Mount Tamalpais lies southwest while the Coastal Range and a view of the distant Pacific Ocean lie to the west.

== Sonoma Creek Falls ==
Sonoma Creek falls down a 25-foot descent, landing on boulders and jagged rocks of the creek below with maple trees and ferns shading the area. It is best to visit during the rainy winter season.

== Weather ==
The temperature in the region remains fairly moderate with a summer high in the 90s and low in the 40s. Winter experiences temperatures ranging from the 30s to 60s. An average of 40 inches of rain fall in the park per year, mostly between November and April, with occasional snowfall.

== See also ==
- California Department of Parks and Recreation
