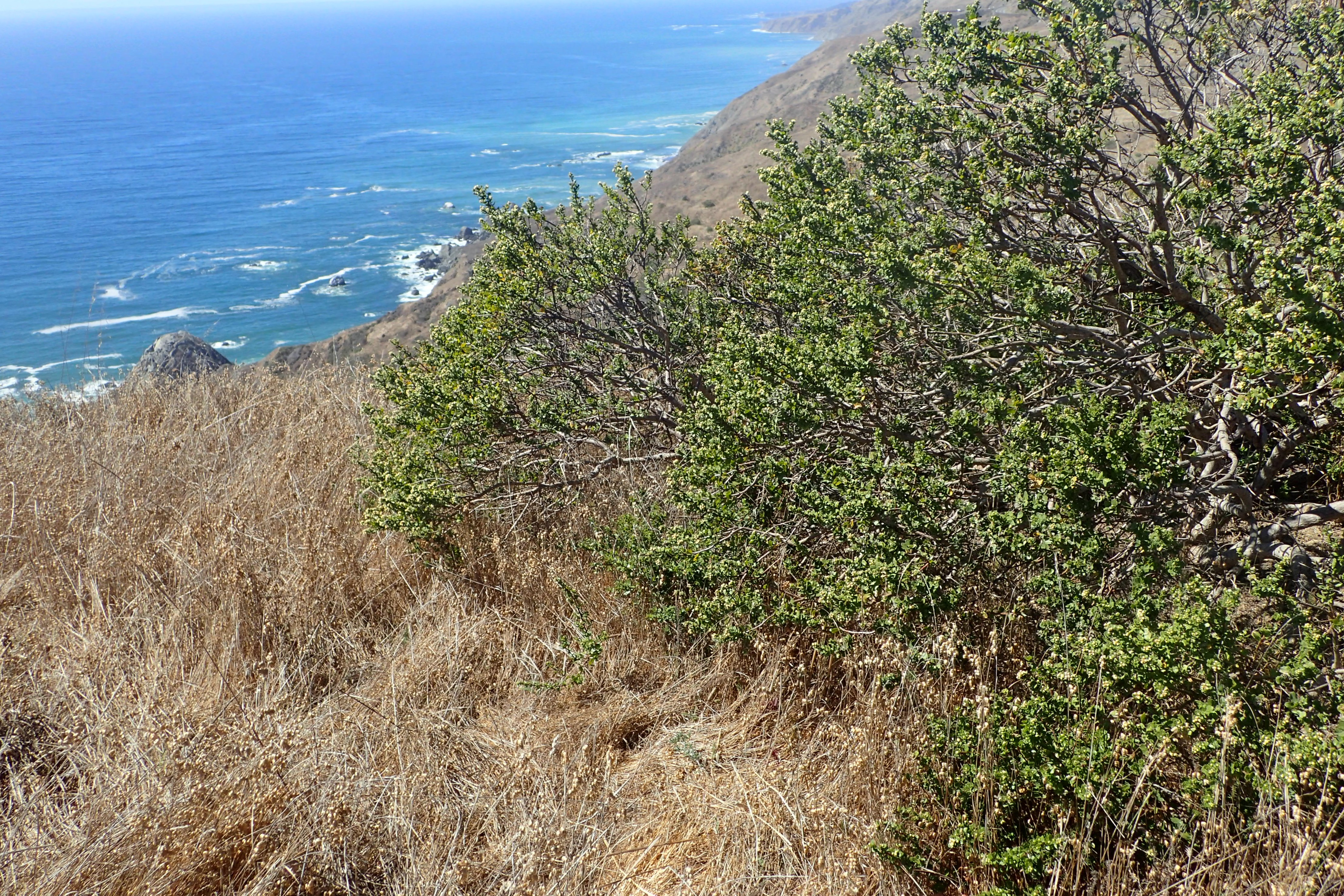
- Baccharis piluaris in habitat in Sonoma County

Scientific classification
- Kingdom: Plantae
- Clade: Tracheophytes
- Clade: Angiosperms
- Clade: Eudicots
- Clade: Asterids
- Order: Asterales
- Family: Asteraceae
- Genus: Baccharis
- Species: B. pilularis

Binomial name
- Baccharis pilularis DC.
- Baccharis pilularis range map, estimated with the iNaturalist Geomodel, 2025

Synonyms
- Baccharis pilularis var. angustissima DC.; Baccharis pilularis var. latifolia DC.; Baccharis congesta DC., syn of subsp. consanguinea; Baccharis consanguinea DC., syn of subsp. consanguinea

= Baccharis pilularis =

Species of shrub

Baccharis pilularis, called coyote brush (or bush), chaparral broom, and bush baccharis, is an evergreen shrub in the family Asteraceae native to California, Oregon, Washington, and Baja California. There are reports of isolated populations in New Mexico, most likely introduced.

== Distribution and habitat ==
The plants are found in a variety of habitats, from coastal bluffs, oak woodlands, and grasslands, including on hillsides and in canyons, below 2,000 feet (610 m).

Coyote brush is known as a secondary pioneer plant in communities such as coastal sage scrub and chaparral. It does not regenerate under a closed shrub canopy because seedling growth is poor in the shade. Coast live oak, California bay, Rhus integrifolia, and other shade producing species replace coastal sage scrub and other coyote brush-dominated areas, particularly when there has not been a wildfire or heavy grazing.

In California grasslands, it comes in late and invades and increases in the absence of fire or grazing. Coyote brush invasion of grasslands is important because it helps the establishment of other coastal sage species. However, establishment of coyote brush can be concerning because it also displaces highly biodiverse grassland habitat that are important to carbon storage and resilient to wildfires. After grassland restoration, coyote brush can be a major concern and plant invader that overtakes grassland habitat, especially if restoration activities are limited and nonperiodic.

A study of coastal grassland restoration at Younger Lagoon Reserve in Santa Cruz County found that Baccharis pilularis was more abundant in restored plots than in unrestored control plots six years after treatment. Experimental drought reduced the recruitment of new plants but did not fully reduce the cover of established coyote brush. This suggests that infrequent restoration activities may encourage shrub encroachment even under dry conditions.

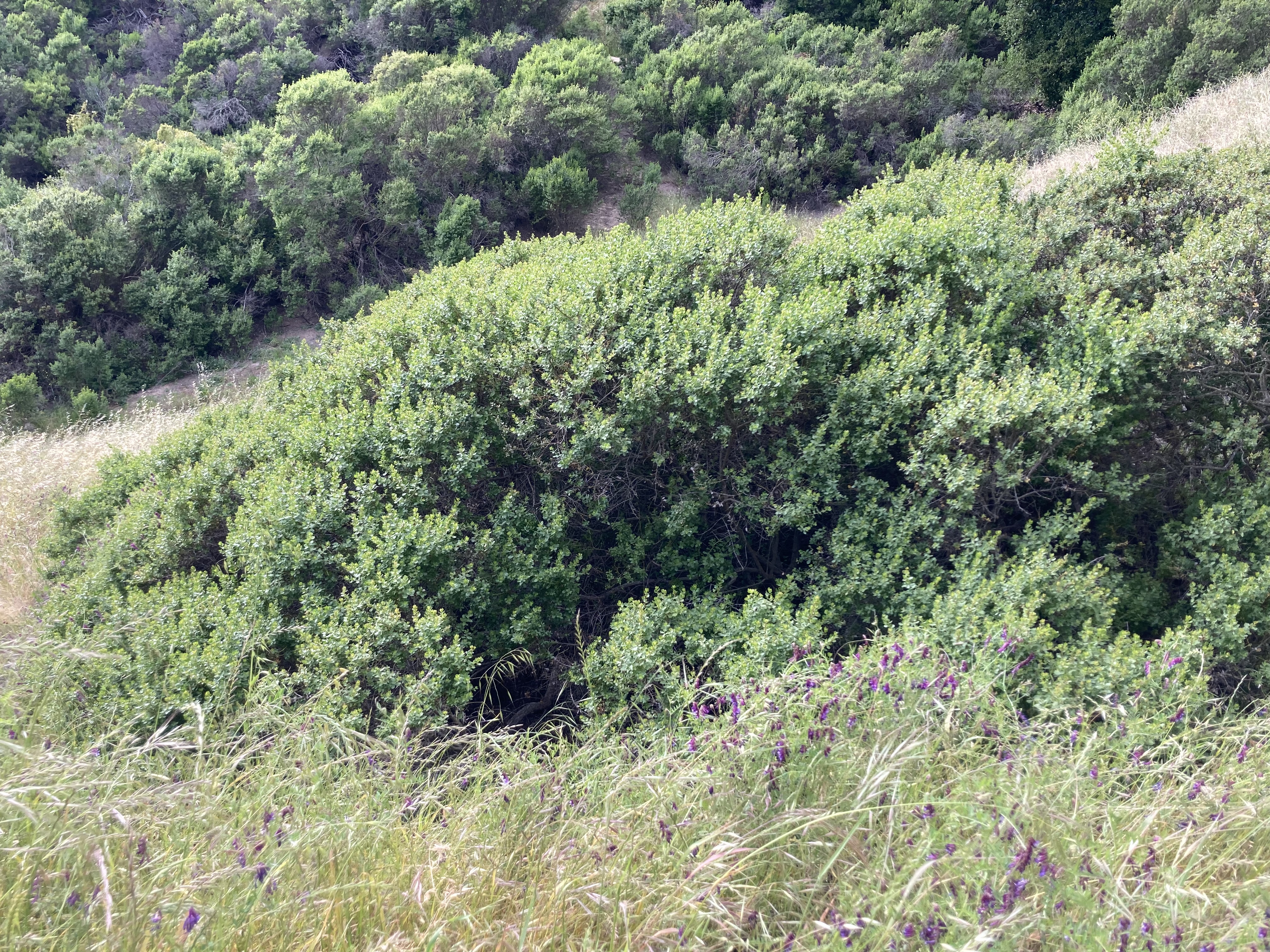
Baccharis pilularis in its typical habitat found here in Briones Regional Park

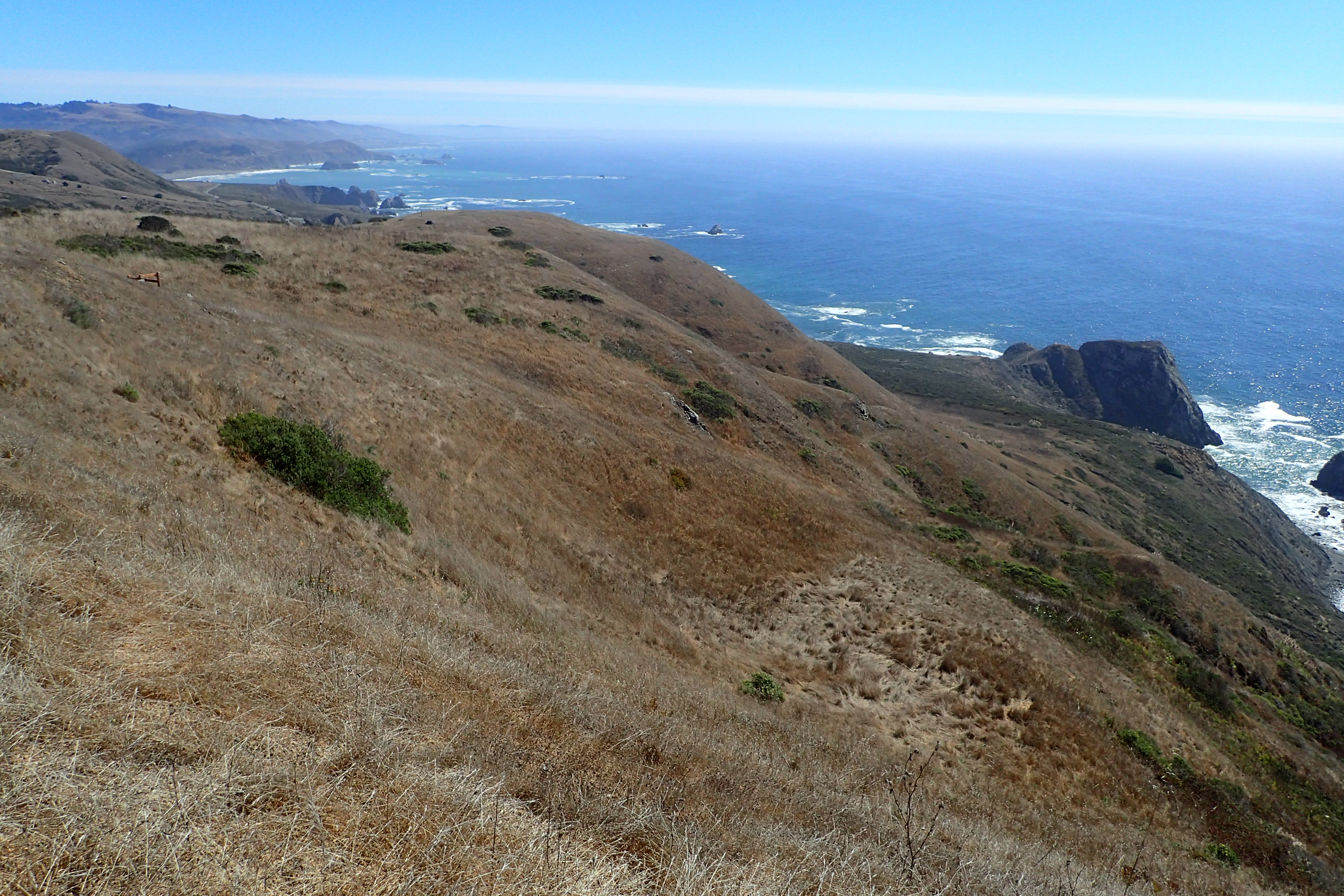
These shrubs can grow in harsh, windswept conditions

== Description ==
The Baccharis pilularis shrub is generally smaller than 3 metres (9.8 ft) in height. Erect plants are generally mixed with (and sometimes grow to become) prostrate plants. Its leaves are smooth, without spines or hairs, and generally sticky to the touch.

The stems are prostrate to erect with branches spreading or ascending. The leaves are 8–55 millimetres (0.31–2.17 in) long and are entire to toothed and oblanceolate to obovate, with three principal veins.

The flower heads are in a leafy panicle. The involucres are hemispheric to bell shaped. This species is dioecious (pistillate and staminate flowers occur on separate plants). Both staminate and pistillate heads are 3.5–5 millimetres (0.14–0.20 in) long. Phyllaries are in 4–6 series, ovate, and glabrous. The receptacles are convex to conic and honeycombed. The staminate flowers range from 20–30 and there are 19–43 pistillate flowers.

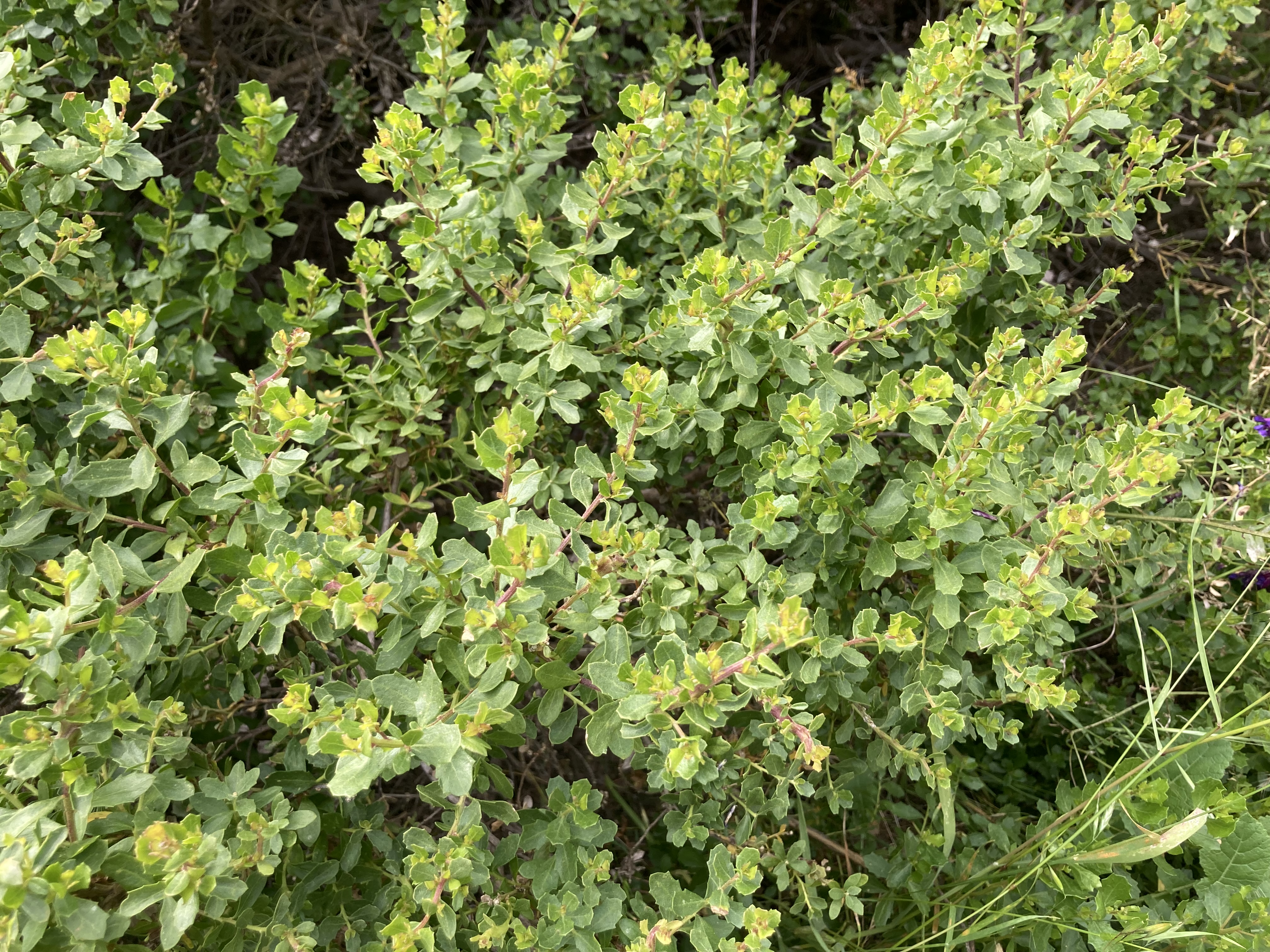
Detail of the leaves

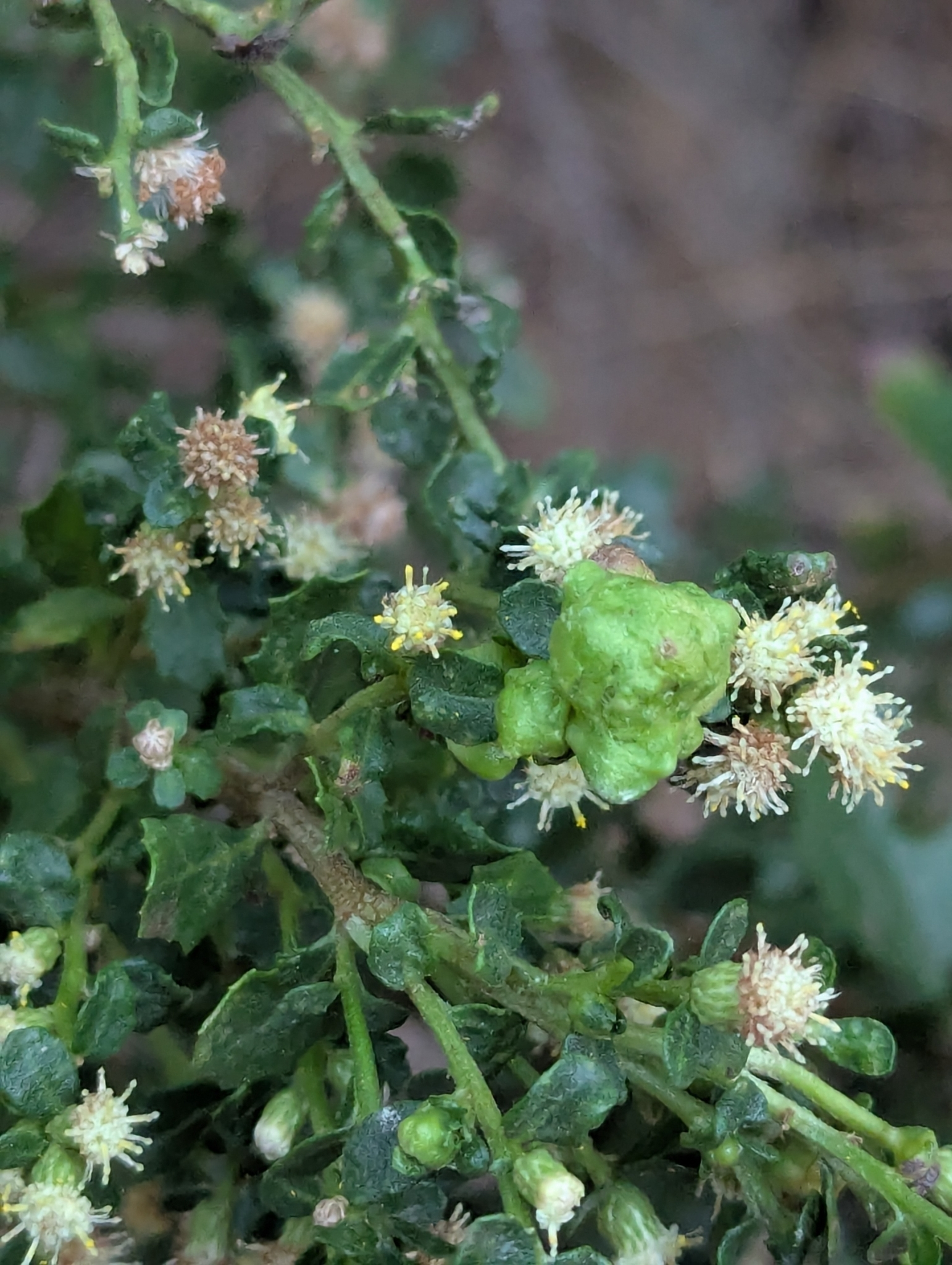
The staminate (male) flowers are flatter and more yellow in color

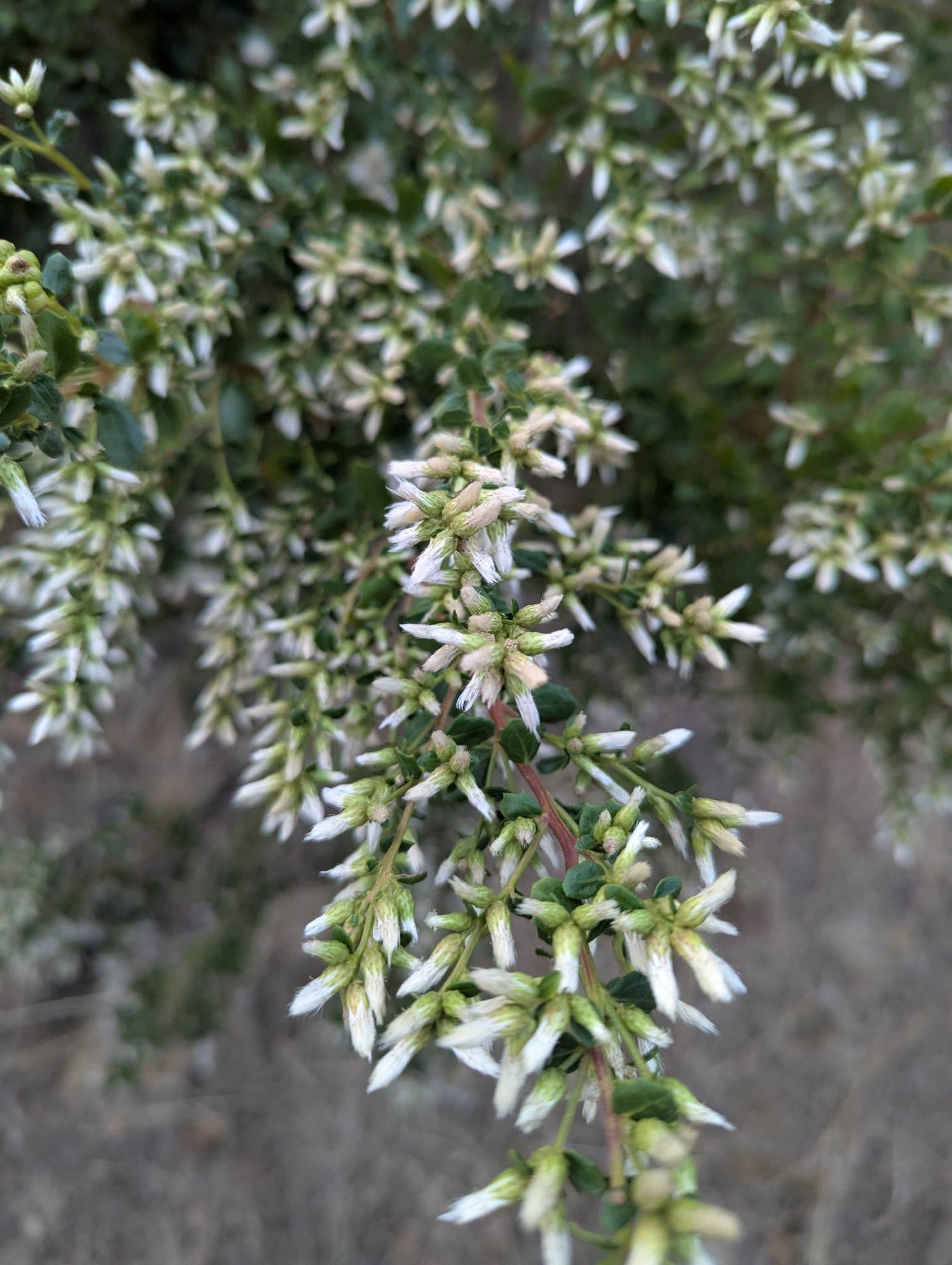
The pistillate (female) flowers are creamy white and resemble artists' paint brushes

This and other Baccharis species are nectar sources for most of the predatory wasps, native skippers (small butterflies), and native flies in their ranges.

Subspecies

- Baccharis pilularis subsp. consanguinea (DC.) C.B.Wolf — primarily in coastal chaparral
- Baccharis pilularis subsp. pilularis — sandy coastal bluffs and beaches in California.

== Cultivation ==
Baccharis pilularis is cultivated as an ornamental plant, and used frequently in drought tolerant, native plant, and wildlife gardens, and in natural landscaping and habitat restoration projects. The cultivar ground cover selections have various qualities of height and spread, leaf colors, and textures. The upright forms are useful for hedges and fence lines, and year-round foliage.

Coyote brush is usually deer-resistant. The plants are also drought tolerant after maturity, requiring watering once a week until established, and then about once per month during the first summer. They can mature in one to two years. The plants prefer good drainage.

Only male plants of Baccharis pilularis are cultivated for landscaping use. If these are substituted for Baccharis pilularis subsp. consanguinea in ecological restoration, there will not be as much seed set, nor recruitment of new individuals.

=== Cultivars ===
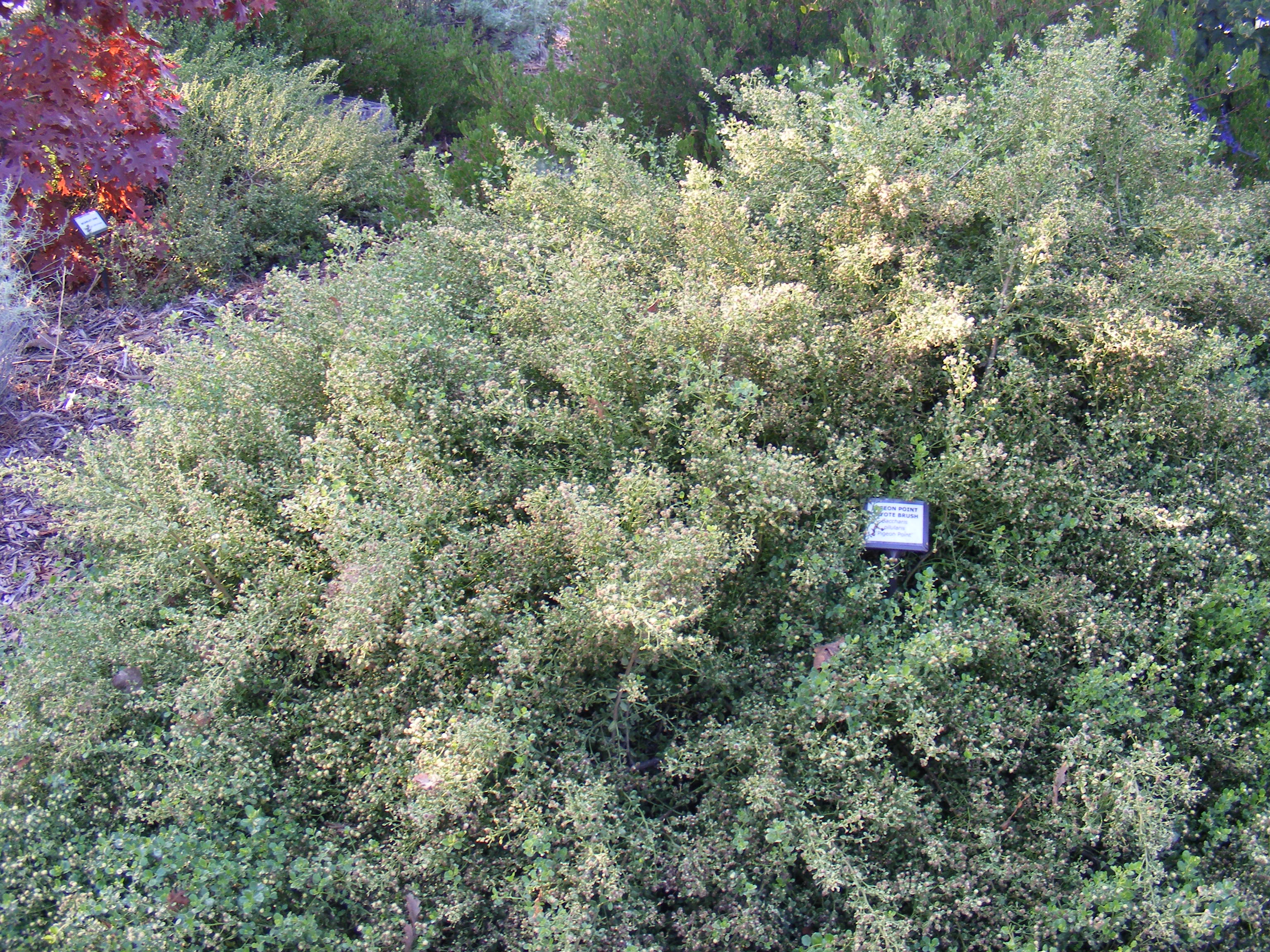
Baccharis pilularis 'Pigeon Point' flowering in a garden.

Cultivars, often with the common name "dwarf coyote brush" or "dwarf baccharis" indicating ground cover selections, include:

- Baccharis pilularis 'Pigeon Point'—from Pigeon Point, California coast.
- Baccharis pilularis 'Twin Peaks'—from coast along Sonoma to Monterey Counties.
- Baccharis pilularis 'Santa Ana'

== See also ==
- California coastal sage and chaparral ecoregion
- California montane chaparral and woodlands ecoregion
- Fire ecology
