= Rincon Creek =

Rincon Creek may refer to:

- Rincon Creek (Pantano Wash), a tributary of the Santa Cruz River (Arizona) in Pima County, Arizona
- Rincon Creek, an alternative name for Brush Creek (Sonoma County, California)
- Rincon Creek (Southern California), a creek that marks the boundary between Santa Barbara and Ventura County, California.
- Rincon Creek (Merced County, California)
- Rincon Creek (Santa Clara County, California)
- Rincon Creek (Sonoma County, California)
