= Gammarotettix bilobatus =

Scientific classification
- Domain: Eukaryota
- Kingdom: Animalia
- Phylum: Arthropoda
- Class: Insecta
- Order: Orthoptera
- Suborder: Ensifera
- Family: Rhaphidophoridae
- Subfamily: Gammarotettiginae
- Genus: Gammarotettix
- Species: G. bilobatus

Binomial name
- Gammarotettix bilobatus (Thomas, 1872)

Species of cricket-like animal

Gammarotettix bilobatus, also known as the arboreal camel cricket, is a North American species of camel cricket in the family Rhaphidophoridae. It is found in California, including along the Coast Ranges and as far south as Gilroy. Adults emerge in February and live until June. Host plants of G. bilobatus include California buckeye, California bay, coast live oak, barberry, Monterey pine, black locust, California lilac, and Christmas berry. To evade predators such as the chestnut-backed chickadee, they jump to the ground.
