= Piner Creek =

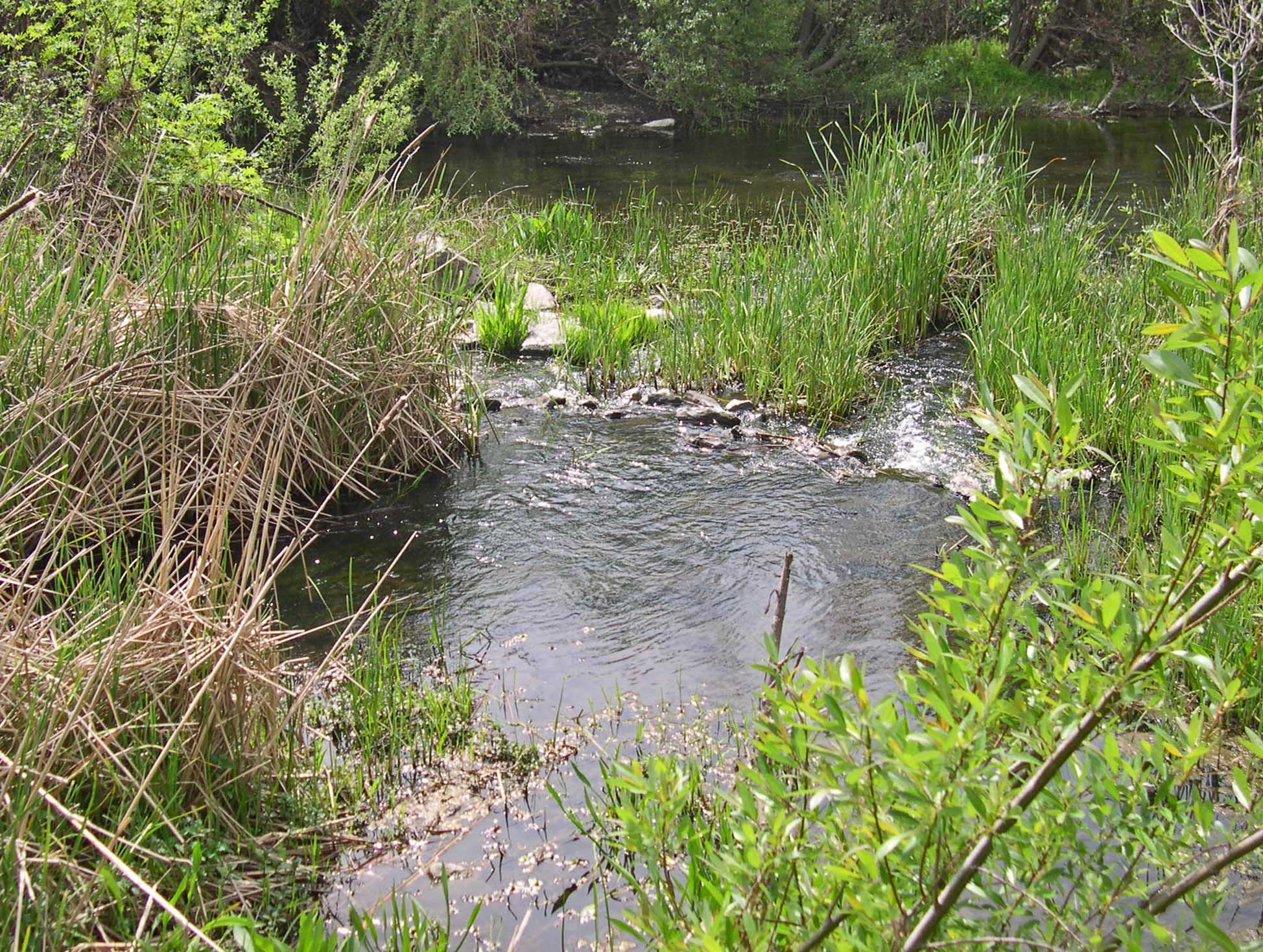
- Piner Creek immediately above the confluence with Santa Rosa Creek

- Location of the mouth of Piner Creek in California

Location
- Country: United States
- State: California
- Region: Sonoma County
- City: Santa Rosa, California

Physical characteristics
- Source: Fountaingrove Lake
  - location: Santa Rosa, California
  - coordinates: 38°29′12″N 122°43′10″W
  - elevation: 495 ft (151 m)
- Mouth: Santa Rosa Creek
  - location: west of Santa Rosa, California
  - coordinates: 38°26′43″N 122°46′35″W
- Basin size: 6.3 sq mi (16 km^{2})

Piner Creek is a stream in northeast Santa Rosa, California, United States (38°27′40″N 122°45′05″W) which originates as an outlet of Fountaingrove Lake. Piner Creek discharges to Santa Rosa Creek which in turn joins the Laguna de Santa Rosa. The upper reaches in the foothills of the Mayacamas Mountains are at elevations of 200 to 300 feet (60 to 90 meters), while the lower and middle reaches are located on the Santa Rosa Plain at elevations of between the 110- and 140-foot (33- and 43-meter) contours; therefore, these lower reaches have a gradient of about 1:250 toward the southwest. Geologic studies in the lower and middle reaches of Piner Creek indicate groundwater levels ranging from three to 15 feet (one to 5 meters) below the surface. Prior to extensive urban development of the middle and lower reaches, the landscape earlier bore extensive agricultural uses including plum orchards, which fruit was subsequently processed for prunes.

The Piner Creek watershed consists of 4,048 acres (16.4 km^{2}), approximately three-fourths of which lies within the municipal boundaries of the city of Santa Rosa. About one-third of the watershed is developed as residential use, and about one-sixth of the land is open space or used for recreation or agriculture. One of the early surviving architectural features of Sonoma County is within the Piner Creek catchment basin: A well preserved Round Barn, constructed in 1899, a testament to the 19th century pasturage uses within this watershed.

== Hydrology ==
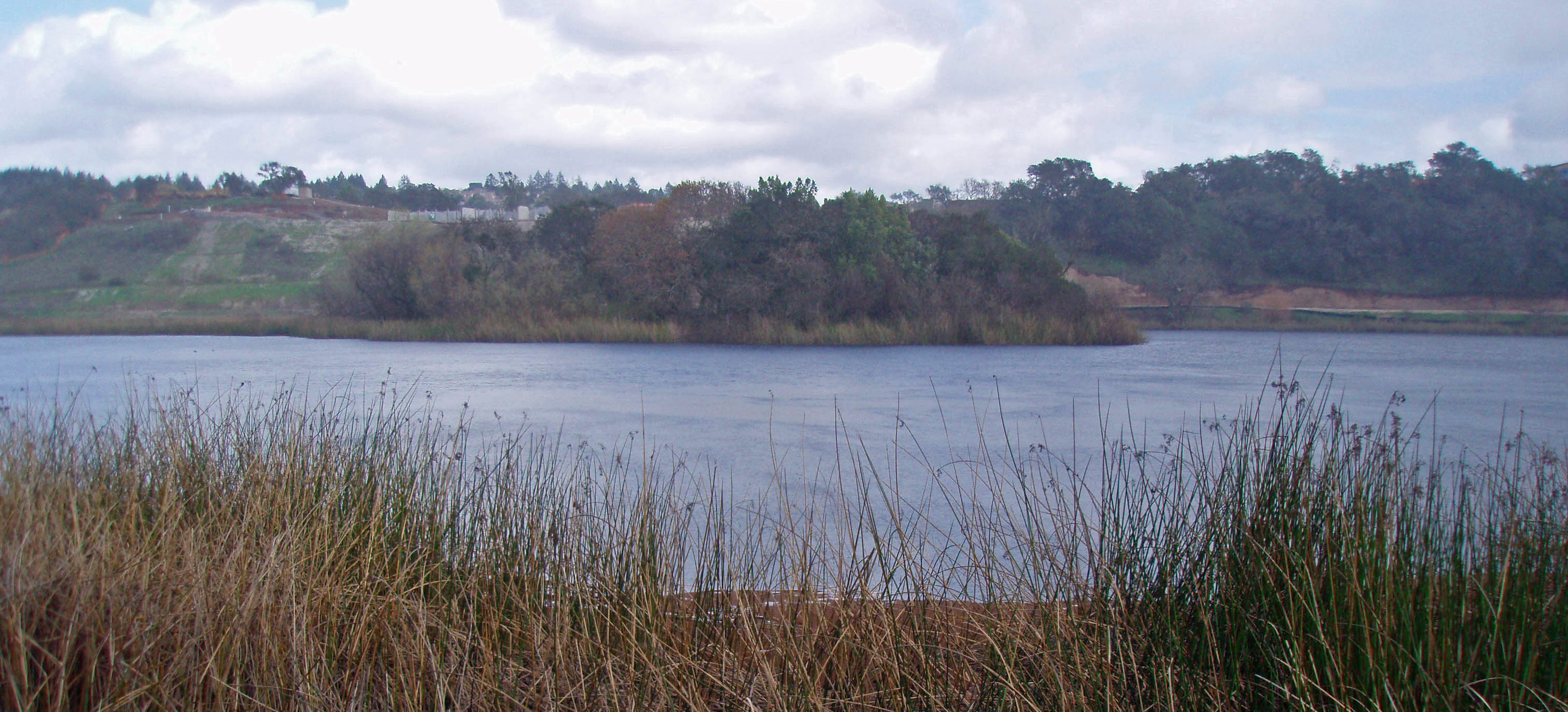
Fountaingrove Lake, the origin of Piner Creek

Piner Creek originates in the lower Mayacmas Mountains at Fountaingrove Lake. From its outlet at Fountaingrove Lake, Piner Creek flows down a relatively steep gradient, initially over a riprap lined channel, which has been modified in association with some alterations to lower Fountaingrove Lake. Thence Piner Creek flows northerly of an upscale modern office park before crossing under Redwood Highway and U.S. Highway 101. West of the U.S. 101 Freeway, Piner Creek winds through a retail and commercial/industrial area, before crossing under Piner Road near Coffey Lane; in this reach there is a large historic release to groundwater of solvent from manufacturing uses stemming back to the 1970s and 1980s.

Water quality of Piner Creek is characterized by pH levels that are mildly basic, with upper reach pH levels about 8.5, declining to lower reach levels at 7.8 just above the discharge to Santa Rosa Creek. The headwaters soils are typically of pH about 6.9. Water quality of Piner Creek is generally low in turbidity, except for highest flow periods resulting from heavy rains; the water is free from odor. Springtime water temperatures are typically in the range of 60 to 65 degrees Fahrenheit (16 to 18 degrees Celsius).

Piner Creek terminates at its confluence with Santa Rosa Creek, which watercourse discharges to the Laguna de Santa Rosa; the Laguna de Santa Rosa ultimately forms a confluence with the Russian River, which flows into the Pacific Ocean.

== Geology ==
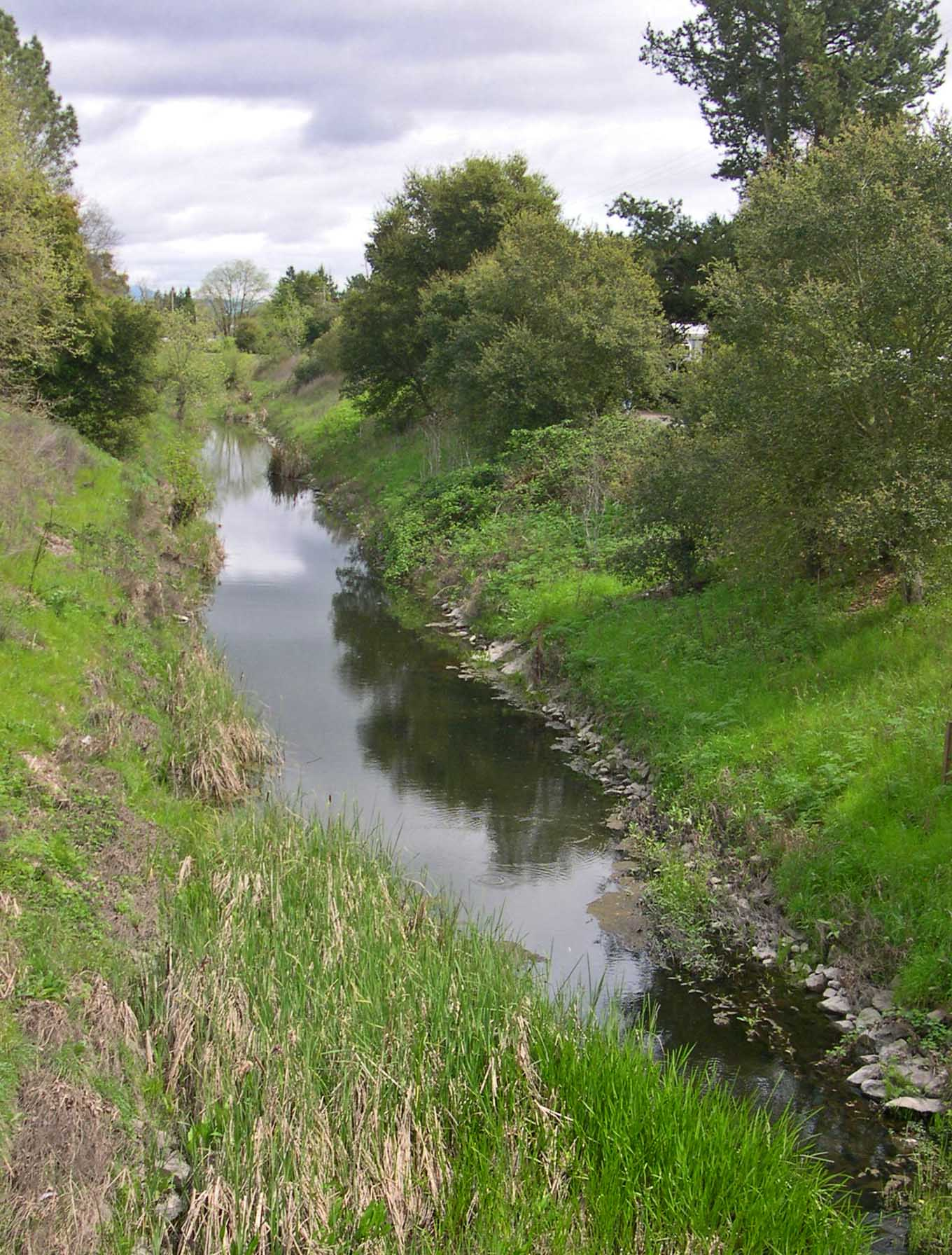
Piner Creek before its confluence with Santa Rosa Creek, on the Santa Rosa Plain

As recently as the Miocene period, twelve million years ago, the entire watershed of Piner Creek was on the floor of the Pacific Ocean. After significant volcanic uplift and tectonic movement, the headwaters region of the Mayacmas Mountains emerged above the ocean. Piner Creek was one of the drainages that began to drain the new landmass, in formation of the eventual Santa Rosa Plain, through which the middle and lower reaches of Piner Creek flow. Occasional basaltic outcrops are seen in the upper reach of Piner Creek, betraying the volcanic origin of the Mayacmas Mountains.

The upper reach of Piner Creek watershed is characterized by presence of Goulding cobbly clay loam soil; this soil has slopes of up to 15 percent and is subject to moderate erosive potential. The actual soil depth is typically only about 20 inches (50 cm) and may contain up to 25 percent cobblestones. Historic use of this soil has been for grazing. As the stream approaches the Santa Rosa Plain immediately east of U.S. Highway 101, slopes diminish to a gradient of five to 15 percent and the predominant soil type is Felta very gravelly loam. This Felta soil is characterized by an upper surface grayish-brown color and texture of a fine, sticky and plastic nature.

West of U.S. Highway 101, Piner Creek flows over the Santa Rosa Plain at gradients of less than two percent. Here the predominant soil type is Zamora silty clay loam, which has been deposited as an alluvial fan as the floodplain formed. The upper soil surface of the Zamora material is grayish-brown hard, firm, sticky and plastic. Permeability is moderately slow and fertility is high for these lower reach soils, which has resulted in historic orchard use and present day vineyards.

== Ecology ==
Formal habitat evaluation of Piner Creek has been conducted along with a number of other streams within the Laguna de Santa Rosa watershed. Habitat value of Piner Creek was found to be Fair compared to higher values scored by Matanzas Creek and Brush Creek and lower values scored by Colgan Creek. Most of the watercourse has been modified to accommodate urban development within Santa Rosa, and some alterations have been conducted to achieve higher levels of flood control. The dominant tree along the banks of Piner Creek is the coast live oak, Quercus agrifolia; within the streambed, a large number of cattail, Typha latifolia, stands are observed. A considerable number of bird species are found along the stream banks of Piner Creek.

Based upon benthic macroinvertebrate sampling in Piner Creek, a low faunal diversity was found; moreover a declining trend of such biodiversity was noted over the period 2000 to 2003. In comparison with other streams of the Santa Rosa Creek watershed, Piner Creek was assessed to have above average epifaunal cover, riffle frequency and siltation characteristics. The high population level of tubificids in Piner Creek indicate the presence of excessive organic loading, mostly due to high nitrate and phosphate runoff from urban uses (and possible reduced dissolved oxygen levels).

== See also ==
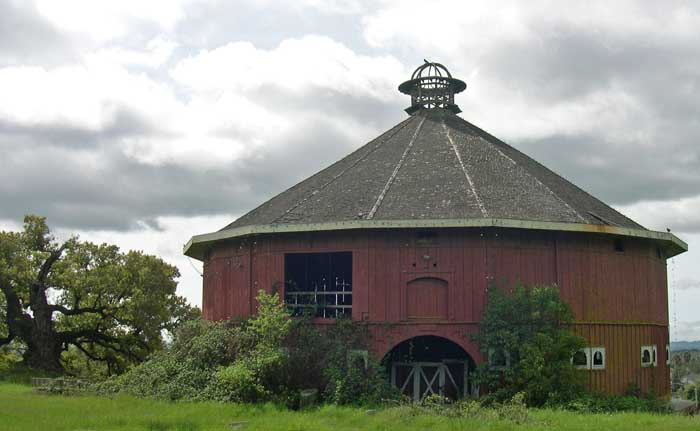
Historic Round Barn, built in 1899, located in the Piner Creek watershed

- Flood control
- Hiking
- List of watercourses in the San Francisco Bay Area
- Miwok
