= Santa Rosa Creek =

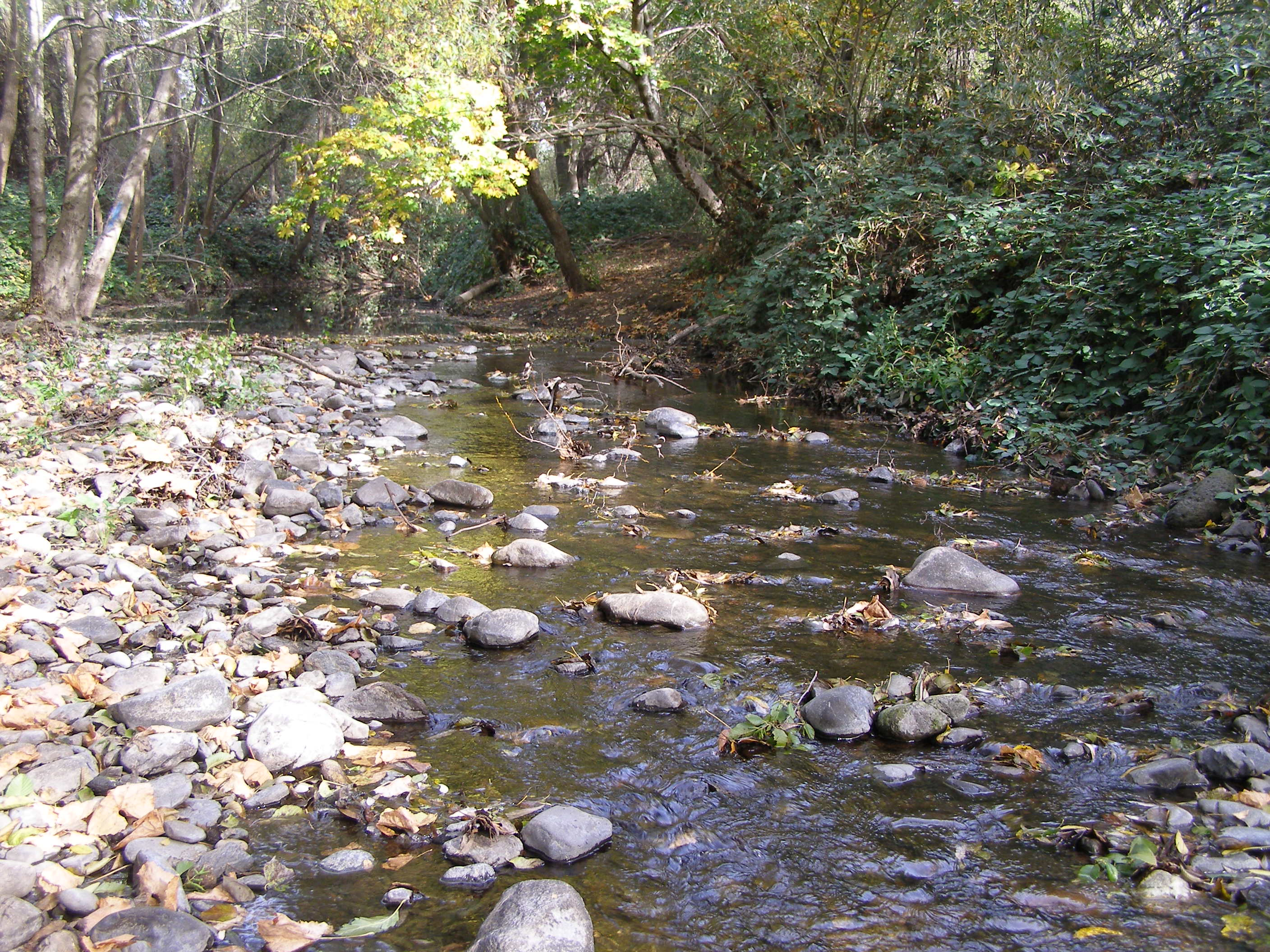
- Middle reach of Santa Rosa Creek

- Location of the mouth of Santa Rosa Creek in California
- Etymology: Spanish

Location
- Country: United States
- State: California
- Region: Sonoma County
- City: Santa Rosa

Physical characteristics
- Source: Hood Mountain
  - location: 5 km (3 mi) west of St. Helena, California
  - coordinates: 38°31′10″N 122°32′56″W
  - elevation: 1,940 ft (590 m)
- Mouth: Laguna de Santa Rosa
  - coordinates: 38°27′5″N 122°50′3″W
  - elevation: 49 ft (15 m)
- Length: 22 mi (35 km)

Basin features
- Tributaries
  - left: Matanzas Creek
  - right: Piner Creek, Brush Creek

Santa Rosa Creek is a 22-mile-long (35 km) stream in Sonoma County, California, which rises on Hood Mountain and discharges to the Laguna de Santa Rosa by way of the Santa Rosa Flood Control Channel. This article covers both the creek and the channel.

== Description ==
Though it begins as a wild stream in the Mayacamas Mountains, Santa Rosa Creek is culverted for part of its course through the city of Santa Rosa's downtown. The riparian area has a rich prehistoric past with settlement of the Southern Pomo people on much of the middle and lower reach banks. A significant stream restoration project was created in the downtown Santa Rosa reach in the late 1990s, allowing steelhead and coho salmon to migrate to productive upstream spawning areas. Major tributaries to Santa Rosa Creek include Brush Creek, Piner Creek, Matanzas Creek and Colgan Creek. Annual precipitation in the Sonoma Creek watershed is about 24 to 38 inches (61 to 97 centimeters). Water quality sampling in the Railroad Square area of Santa Rosa indicate coliform bacteria standards are often exceeded.

== History ==
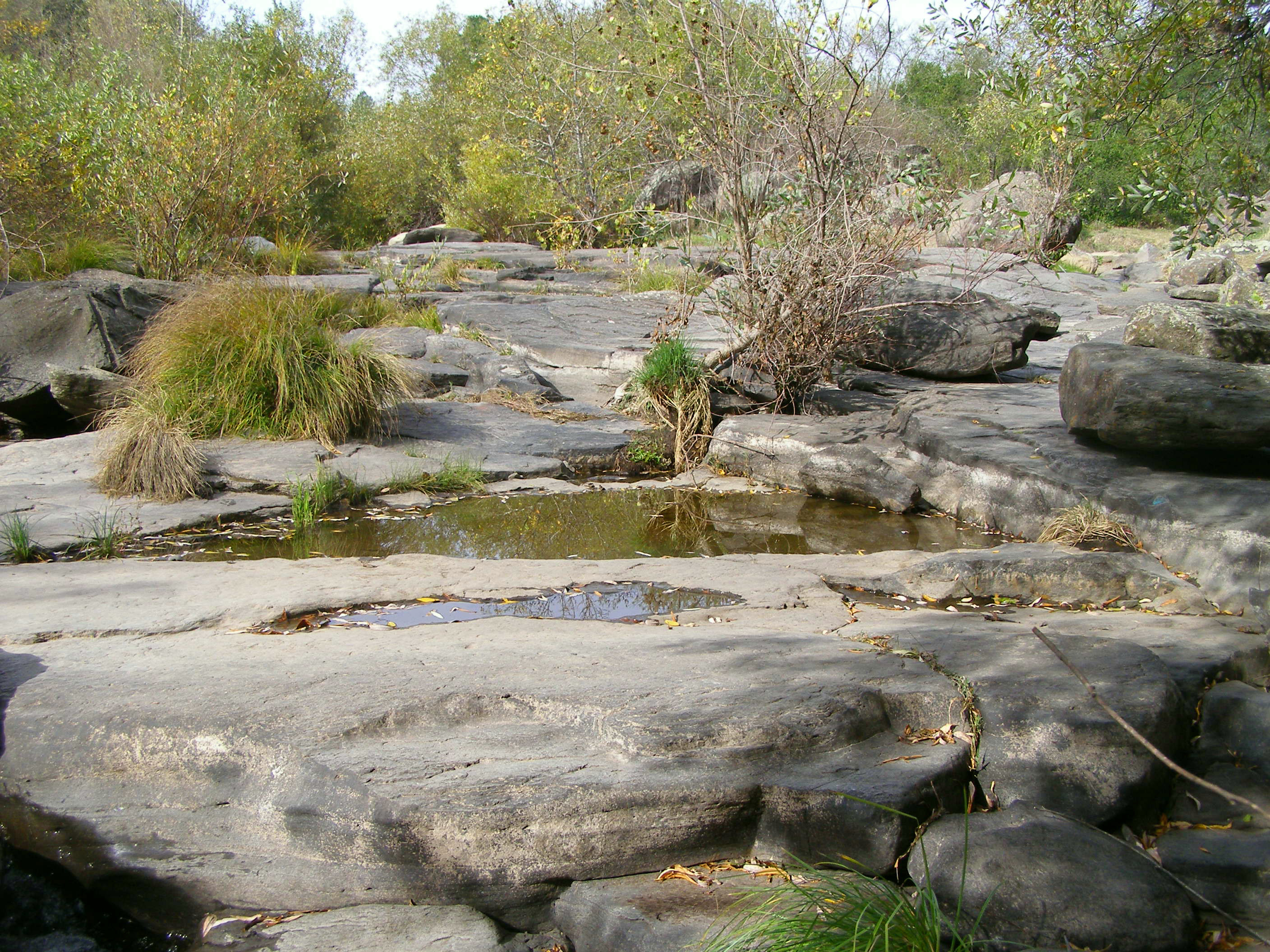
Flat Rocks boulder formation in the confluence zone of Brush Creek into Santa Rosa Creek

Archaeological data demonstrates the habitation of Pomo tribes on the lower reaches of Santa Rosa Creek, while a branch of the Yuki tribe lived near the headwaters on the slopes of Hood Mountain. In the vicinity of the confluence of Brush Creek there is a noteworthy rock formation known as "Flat Rocks"; adjacent was a native Pomo village, presumably because the resources of the confluence area as a suitable place for fishing, bathing, washing and providing drinking water. Near this location in the year 1828, Padre Juan Amorós, a Franciscan from Mission San Raphael, baptized a Pomo maiden on the feast day of Saint Rose of Lima; he named the woman "Rosa" and the location "Santa Rosa," establishing there a mission outpost (una asistencia). The "asistencia de Santa Rosa" became the center of the colonial settlement that would eventually become the town of Santa Rosa.

In the city of Santa Rosa, remains of the Carrillo Adobe attest to Spaniards as settlers in the middle reaches of Santa Rosa Creek. As the city of Santa Rosa developed more intensively, political pressure arose in the 1960s to channelize much of the creek in the core area of the city. This action led to a greatly reduced capability for anadromous fish to reach spawning areas upstream. Consequently, by the 1990s, planning began for a creek restoration project to tear out much of the channel concrete lining, provide re-vegetation and create a new low flow channel to accommodate steelhead and coho salmon spawning runs to the middle and upper reaches (i.e. above the downtown area of the city of Santa Rosa). As of July 2008, much of the renovation has been largely completed west of Santa Rosa Avenue, with the Prince Memorial Greenway extending along the creek west from Santa Rosa Avenue through downtown. This includes paved bicycle and pedestrian paths, creek access points, and substantial planting of vegetation. However, the portion between Santa Rosa Avenue and E Street is still contained within a covered culvert despite long-term plans to reopen the portion of it currently under city hall.

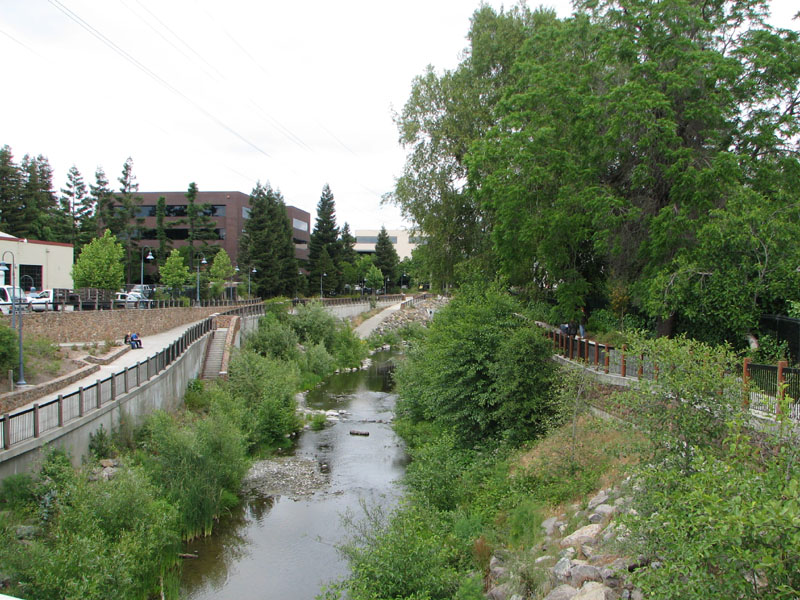
Prince Memorial Greenway is a bicycle and pedestrian path along the Santa Rosa Creek through downtown Santa Rosa and a key element of the creek's restoration.

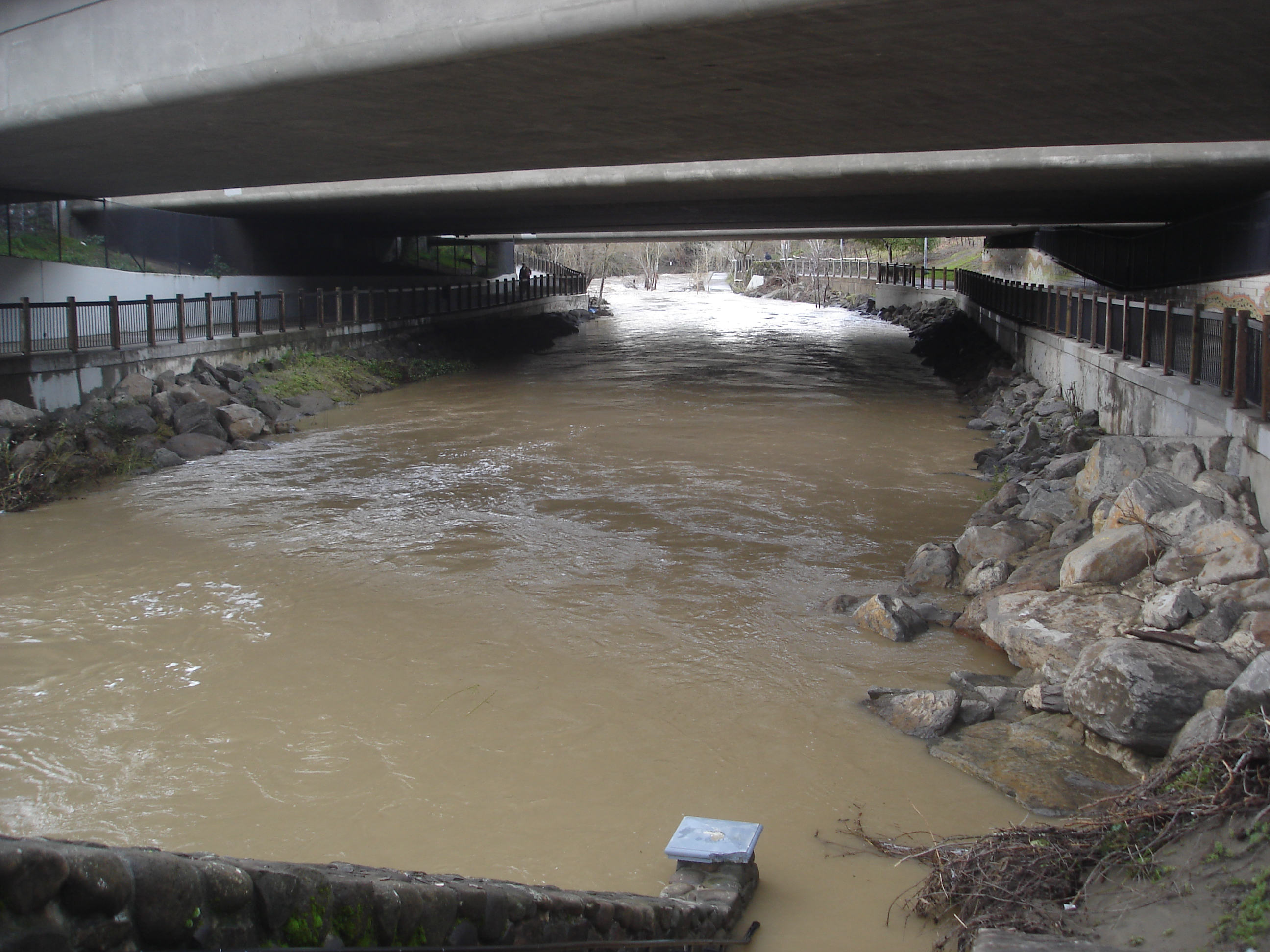
January 2017 high water where Prince Memorial Greenway passes under U.S. Route 101

== Geology ==
The headwaters of Santa Rosa Creek rise on the northern slopes of Hood Mountain, where the soils at the headwaters consist of soils of the Goulding cobbly clay loam association, which are well-drained gently to very steep loams and clay-loams situated upon upland formations. The lower elevations of the Hood Mountain headwaters consist of the Boomer soil association, which group has well-drained loams over a clay-loam subsoil. Considering the steepness of much of the terrain there is a remarkable lack of erosion, primarily because human access has been historically low, and vegetative cover has been kept intact.

As Santa Rosa Creek descends toward the valley floor Falta very gravelly loam is encountered, which has scrubby Valley Oak cover. On the gentle rolling slopes that join the valley are Haire series moderately well drained clay loam soils, which are used for dry-farm pasture and some vineyards. On the valley floor Santa Rosa Creek flows under State Route 12 and runs along Melita Road, thence somewhat more northerly and parallels the south side of Route 12. Over this middle reach the soils are typical of alluvial fans, consisting of Yolo silt loams and clay loams of less than two percent slope. Historically this soil has served pasture uses with some orchards. Currently most of this area is developed with medium density residential uses.

Below the downtown confluence with Matanzas Creek, which drains the northern slopes of Sonoma Mountain, can be considered the lower reach of this watershed. Most of the soils extending some distance from Santa Rosa Creek are Yolo sandy loam overwash. This zone is especially subject to flooding, and historically has served as pasture, orchard and vineyard. Erosion potential is slight due to the less than five percent slope of this reach.

== Ecology ==
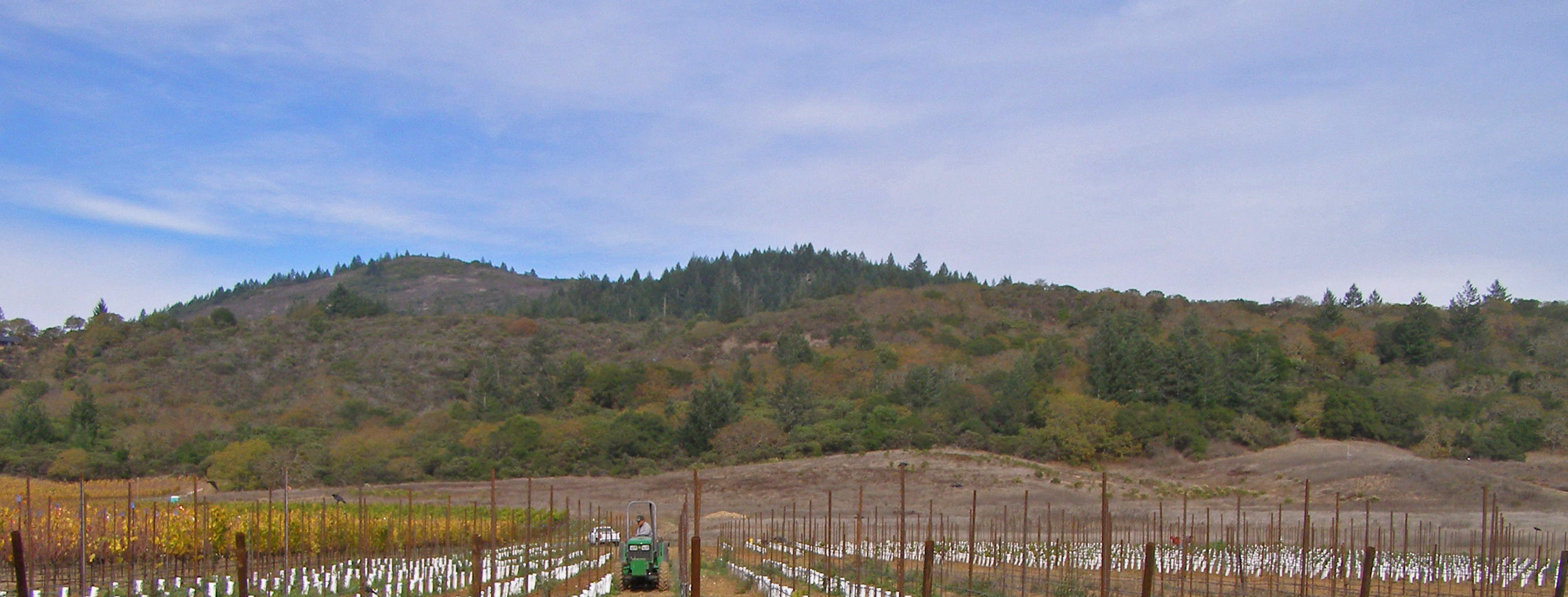
Mayacamas Mountains headwaters reach area of Santa Rosa Creek

The upper reaches and headwaters of Santa Rosa Creek are on Hood Mountain on the western slopes of the southern Mayacamas Mountains. Much of the ecosystem of the headwaters is relatively dense mixed oak woodland, which has a canopy of coast live oak, Douglas fir, California buckeye (Aesculus californica) and bigleaf maple. In these oak woodlands, the dominant understory plants are toyon, blackberry, western poison-oak and in occasional drier patches some coyote brush. In some of the steeper, cooler riparian zones there are a high concentration of California bay laurel. Common animals observed include California mule deer, gray squirrel, raccoon, skunk, Western pond turtle, river otter and opossum. Less frequently tiger salamander, bobcat and mountain lion are seen. There is abundant birdlife including the scrub jay, Steller's jay, acorn woodpecker and junco.

As Santa Rosa Creek reaches the valley floor near Melita Road, the creek is choked with red willow, and also has coast live oak, bigleaf maple, California laurel as well as a few Douglas fir and huckleberry oak, Quercus vacciniifolia. This middle reach of the creek has more of a suburban character compared to the wild headwaters area. The middle reach continues as a richly vegetated riparian zone from Melita Road westerly to Farmers Lane. The reach at the confluence of Brush Creek is particularly notable for the large boulder formation, known as "Flat Rocks". Below Farmers Lane the creek becomes channelized and much of the natural character is lost, until the creek begins to exit the west side of the city of Santa Rosa.

== See also ==
- Annadel State Park
- List of watercourses in the San Francisco Bay Area
