= Mount Hood (California) =

Mountain in California

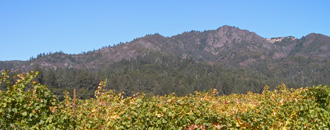
- Mount Hood viewed from Sonoma Valley

Highest point
- Elevation: 2,733 ft (833 m) NAVD 88
- Prominence: 1,970 ft (600 m)
- Coordinates: 38°27′36″N 122°33′12″W

Geography
- Location: Sonoma County, California, U.S.
- Parent range: Mayacamas Mountains
- Topo map: USGS Kenwood

Climbing
- Easiest route: Trail

Mount Hood, also known as Hood Mountain, is a mountain near the southeastern edge of Santa Rosa, California, at the northeast of the Sonoma Valley and attains a height of 2,733 feet (833 m). The original name was Mount Wilikos, an Indian name meaning "willows." Most of the drainage from Mount Hood contributes to the headwaters of Sonoma Creek. A prominent feature is the extensive rock face visible on the upper half of the mountain as viewed from State Route 12. The habitats on the mountain include mixed oak forest, pygmy forest, chaparral and riparian zones. In prehistoric times the slopes of Mount Hood were inhabited by a division of the Yuki tribe. Most of Mount Hood is within the Hood Mountain Regional Park maintained by Sonoma County. Mount Hood is part of the inner coast Mayacamas Range, and lies mostly within Sonoma County, with a part of the mountain geographically within Napa County. Mount Hood affords overlooks of the Pacific Ocean, San Francisco Bay and "a spectacular view east to the Sierra Nevada Range."

== Area setting ==
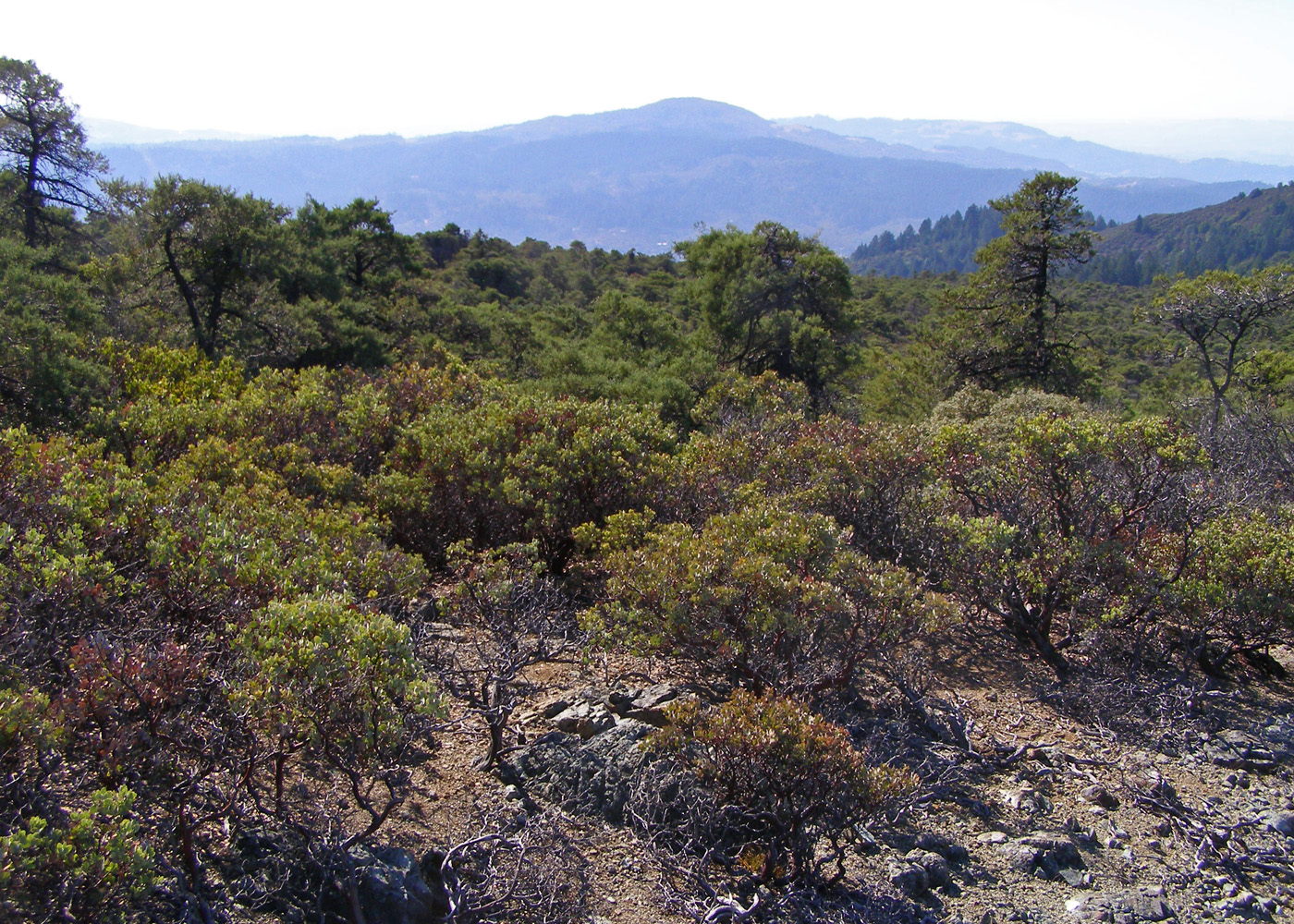
View from Mount Hood looking west, with chaparral in foreground

Mount Hood is most easily accessed via State Route 12, which runs along the bottomland of the Sonoma Valley and connects the town of Sonoma to the city of Santa Rosa. Closest viewing areas of Mount Hood from the valley floor are from the village of Kenwood, from the intersection of State Route 12 with Pythian Road, and from the community of Oakmont, the easternmost neighborhood of Santa Rosa. From these viewing locations a volcanic rocky outcrop near the peak of Mount Hood, also known as Gunsight Point, is prominent on the Mayacmas ridgeline, along with Bald Mountain, within Sugarloaf Ridge State Park, itself located approximately three miles east.

Mount Hood is also visible from the floor of the Napa Valley as well as eastern slopes above that valley. From the summit there are expansive views westerly to Annadel State Park and beyond to Sonoma Mountain. On clear days there are distant views westerly to the Pacific Ocean and easterly to the Sierra Nevada Mountains.

== Geology and hydrology ==
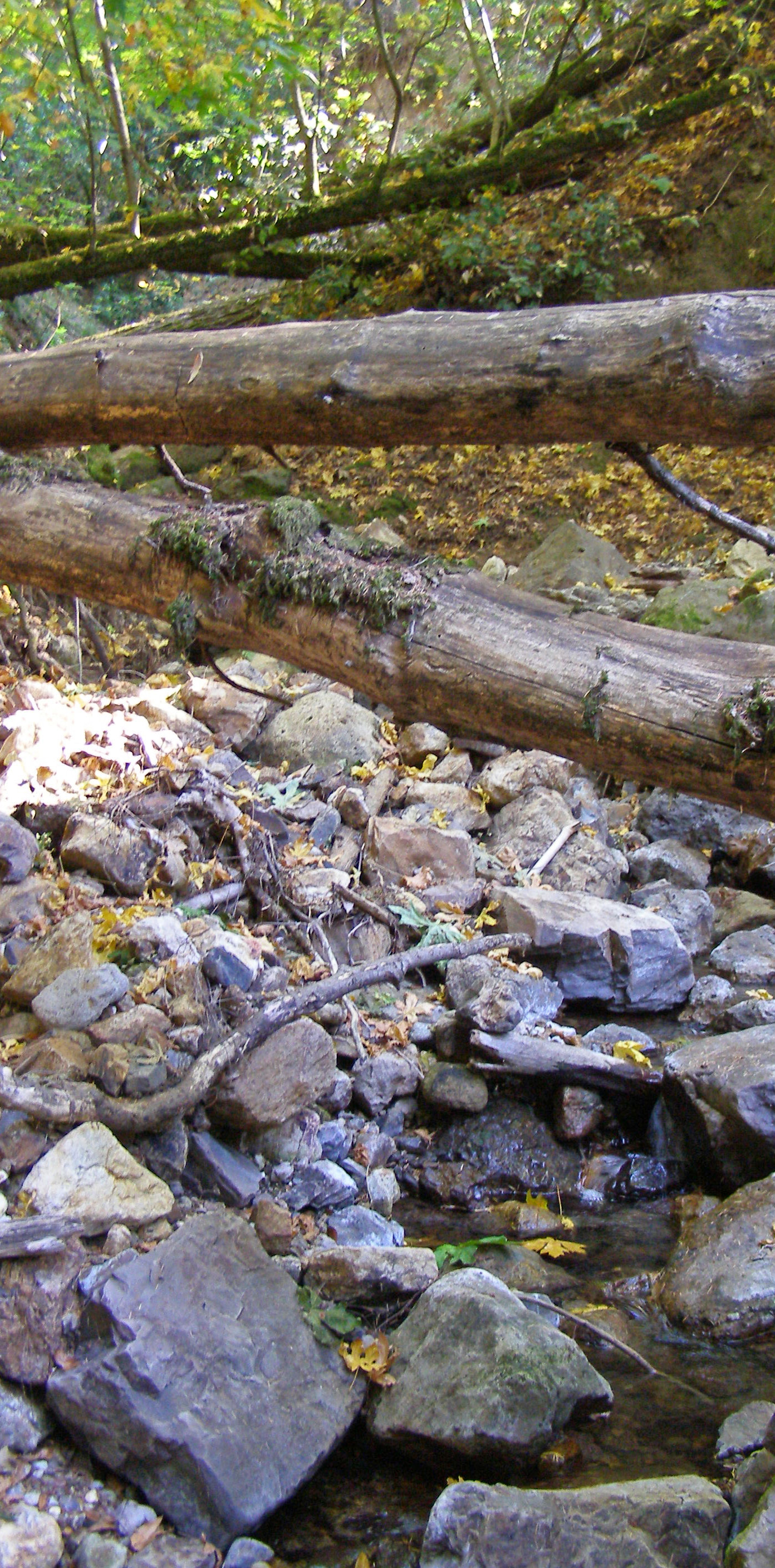
Hood Creek with flowing water late in the dry season

The base of Mount Hood consists of soils of the Goulding-Toomes-Guenoc association, which are well-drained gently to very steep loams and clay-loams situated upon upland formations. The upper reaches consist of the Kidd-Forward-Cohasset association, which group ranges from well drained to excessively drained moderate to very steep gravelly and stony loams. Specific soil map patches on the upper slopes include Boomer loam on some 15 to 30 percent slopes; Goulding cobbly clay loam on 15 to 30 percent slopes; Henneke gravelly loam on some 5 to 30 percent slopes; Henneke gravelly loam on 30 to 75 percent slopes; and rock land on 15 to 75 percent slopes.

Considering the steepness of much of the terrain there is a remarkable lack of erosion, primarily because human access has been historically low, and vegetative cover has been kept intact. The headwaters of Santa Rosa Creek rise on the northern slopes of Mount Hood, whereas the central and eastern portions of the mountain contribute to the watershed of Sonoma Creek which rises in the Sugarloaf area. Hood Creek and Graywood Creek, draining portions of Mount Hood, are smaller tributaries that feed Sonoma Creek. Precipitation amounts to approximately 30 inches (76.2 cm) per annum on Mount Hood.

== Ecology ==
There are several distinct habitats in the Mount Hood area, including:

- Mixed oak woodland
- Chaparral
- Pygmy forest
- Riparian zone

In addition there is a specialized habitat on the upper western face consisting of extensive rock outcrops, which can be considered a variant of the chaparral habitat with small forest pockets.

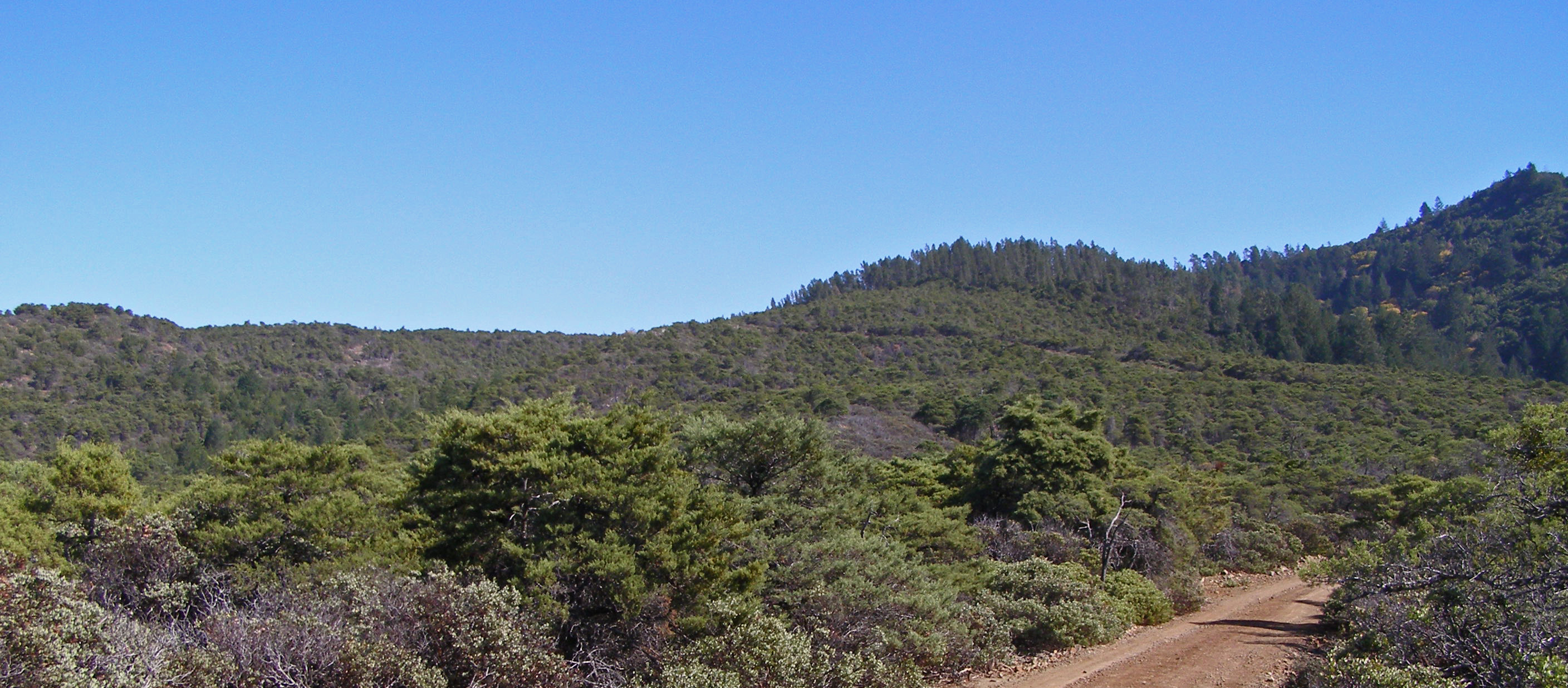
Pygmy forest on northwest slope of Mount Hood. Note darker vegetation in upper right is a mixed oak woodland, of canopy height about 120 feet (37 m).

The mixed oak woodland habitat dominates the lower elevations with coast live oak, Douglas fir, California buckeye and bigleaf maple forming the majority of the canopy. The understory is sparse, particularly of the deep ravine areas such as Hood Creek riparian zones. Some toyon, poison oak and hollyleaf cherry are found beneath the canopy. At mid-level elevations there are also considerable numbers of tanbark oak and Pacific madrone contributing to the canopy.

Chaparral areas are dominated by several varieties of manzanita, including notably Arctostaphylos manzanita 'Mount Hood'. There is also a considerable abundance of poison oak and coyote brush present in these exposed rocky thin soil habitats. Fire risk is naturally greatest in this ecosystem, and some evidence of fires are seen at an estimated age of twenty years past.

There are sizable pygmy forest areas on the west facing slopes and more level inner plateaus of Mount Hood. Here the predominant species are Sargent cypress, various Arctostaphylos species and coyote brush. The Sargent cypress were formerly misidentified as Mendocino cypress (Cupressus pygmaea), which would be far out of their native range here. The height of the pygmy forest is ten to fifteen feet (3 to 5 m) and these patches of relatively dense thickets extend for about one-half to one and a half miles (0.80 to 2.41 km) in patch size.

The riparian zones tend to occur in deep, heavily forested ravine areas that are highly shaded. These typically steep woodlands have a high percentage of California laurel trees, understory ferns and toyons. Several of the streams such as Sonoma Creek, Hood Creek and Santa Rosa Creek are generally year-round flowing, except for the very highest reaches (e.g. above 2,200 feet; 670 m). Considerable bird life occurs in the Mount Hood environment, but particularly in the riparian zones scrub jay, woodpeckers and juncos are apparent.

Mountain lions, bobcats and rattlesnakes may be found throughout the area, with the snakes preferring west facing sun-exposed rocky slopes.

== Hiking ==
Trails leading to the summit of Mount Hood begin at three locations:

- Along Adobe Canyon Road within adjacent Sugarloaf Ridge State Park, on the southeast side of the mountain
- At the end of Pythian Road, on the west side
- At the end of Los Alamos Road, on the north side

Trails leading from the first two trailheads involve relatively direct climbs of about 2,000 vertical feet (610 m) to the summit, whereas trails from the Los Alamos Road trailhead take a longer route to the summit but involve about the same vertical rise.

The Goodspeed/Nattkemper Trail, which climbs to the summit from the Adobe Canyon Road trailhead, offers the most direct access to the summit and to Gunsight Rock, from which distant views to the south and west are available. From the Los Alamos Road trailhead, the Hood Mountain Trail descends to and crosses Santa Rosa Creek, then climbs via an easily walked fireroad to the summit, passing through the pygmy forest on the northwest side of the mountain. The Summit Trail branches from the Hood Mountain Trail at about 1,400 feet (427 m) elevation and offers a more rugged hike to the summit. From the Pythian Road trailhead, the Lower and Upper Johnson Ridge trails climb relatively directly to the Hood Mountain Trail and on to the summit. The Pythian Road trailhead also provides good access to the pygmy forest via the Panorama Ranch Trail.

There is no potable water supplied within the Mount Hood area except at the parking lot at the Pythian Road trailhead. Limited overnight camping is available at two on-trail locations within the regional park. Dogs on leashes are allowed within the park.

== Name ==
The mountain is named after William Hood, a settler from Scotland who climbed the peak in 1846.

== See also ==
- List of Sonoma County Regional Parks facilities
- List of summits of the San Francisco Bay Area
- William Hood House
