= William Hood House =

Historic house in California, United States

- U.S. National Register of Historic Places
- California Historical Landmark
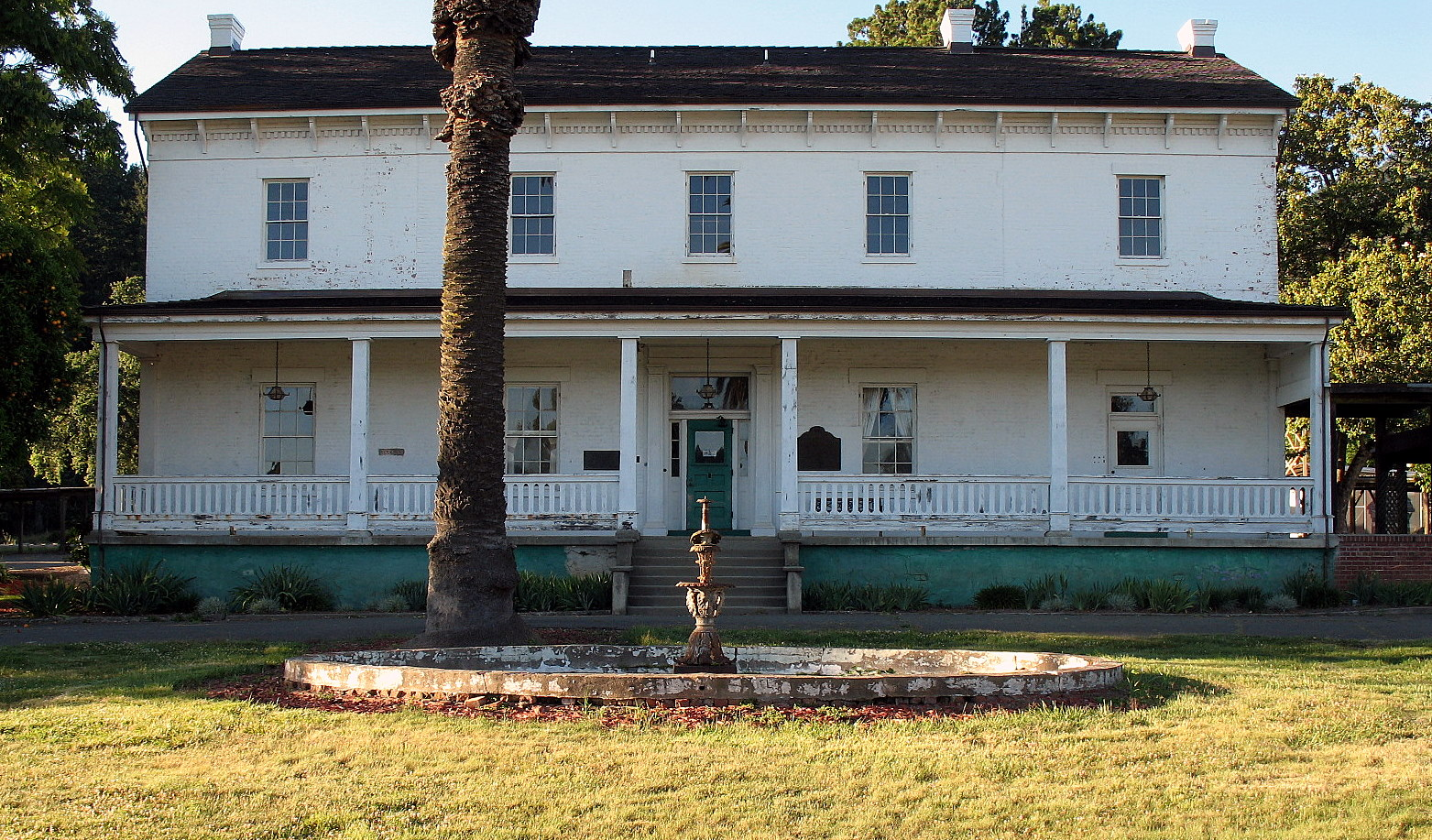

- Location within California
- Location: 7501 Sonoma Hwy, Santa Rosa, California
- Coordinates: 38°26′37″N 122°34′36″W
- Built: 1858
- Architect: William Hood
- Architectural style: Colonial Revival
- NRHP reference No.: 97001658
- CHISL No.: 692

Significant dates
- Added to NRHP: February 6, 1998
- Designated CHISL: July 31, 1959

The William Hood House was built in 1858 by William Hood. Its California Historical Landmark number is 692. It was listed on the National Register of Historic Places on February 6, 1998.

The house was built from bricks that were made on the property. An adobe building, a vineyard and a winery were built with the house, none of which remain.

The Knights of Pythias bought the house in 1924, after several different owners including United States Senator mining magnate, railroad and newspaper owner Thomas Kearns. The Los Guilicos School for Girls purchased the land in 1943.

A sign posted in November 2008 states that, after restoration, the house would be opened to the public.

== See also ==
- Hood Mountain
- National Register of Historic Places listings in Sonoma County, California
