= Gammarotettix genitalis =

Scientific classification
- Domain: Eukaryota
- Kingdom: Animalia
- Phylum: Arthropoda
- Class: Insecta
- Order: Orthoptera
- Suborder: Ensifera
- Family: Rhaphidophoridae
- Subfamily: Gammarotettiginae
- Genus: Gammarotettix
- Species: G. genitalis

Binomial name
- Gammarotettix genitalis Caudell, 1916

Species of cricket-like animal

Gammarotettix genitalis is a species of camel cricket in the family Rhaphidophoridae. It is found in North America.
