= Fountaingrove Lake =

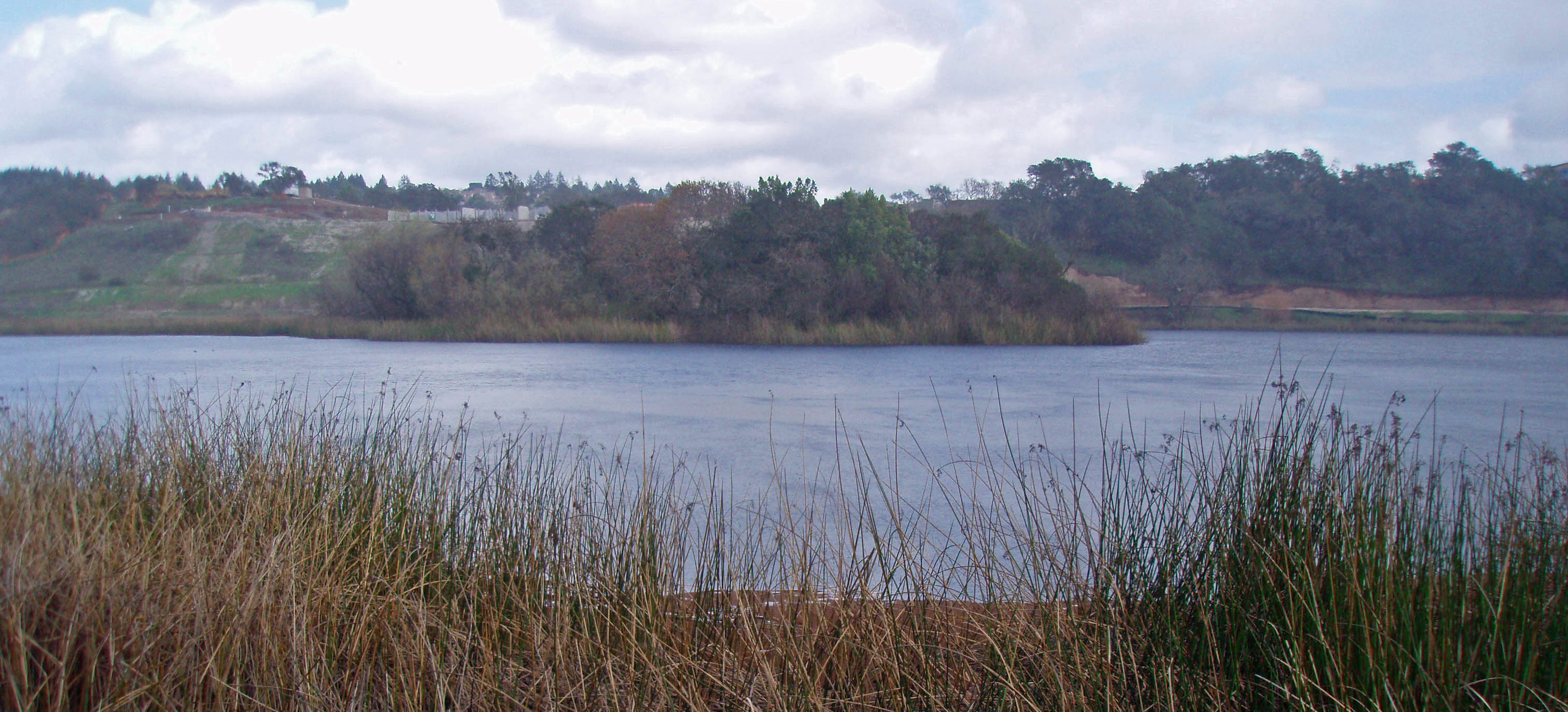

- Location within California
- Location: Sonoma County, California
- Coordinates: 38°29′12″N 122°43′10″W
- Type: reservoir
- Primary inflows: Piner Creek
- Primary outflows: Piner Creek
- Catchment area: 0.52 sq mi (1.3 km^{2})
- Basin countries: United States
- Surface area: 33 acres (130,000 m^{2})
- Water volume: 427 acre⋅ft (527,000 m^{3})
- Surface elevation: 495 ft (151 m)
- Islands: 1
- Settlements: Santa Rosa

Fountaingrove Lake is a reservoir in the city of Santa Rosa, California, United States. Formed by the Fountaingrove Dam, the lake is fed from the east by Piner Creek, which is also the lake's sole outlet.

Fountaingrove Dam is an earthen dam built in 1953. It is 38 ft (12 m) high, 500 ft (150 m) long, and 15 ft (5 m) wide.

In 1985, a private country club known as The Fountaingrove Club built a championship 18-hole golf course centered on Fountaingrove Lake. The golf course was designed by Ted Robinson Sr.

The dam and half the lake is owned by the city of Santa Rosa as the Nagasawa Community Park.

== Ecology ==
Fountaingrove has significant aquatic as well as upland biota, and is noted for being a habitat of the Western pond turtle, Actinemys marmorata, a "Species of Special Concern".

Within the lake at its verges are significant densities of wetland plants; moreover, at upland locations there are many native trees, particularly Coast live oak, Quercus agrifolia and Garry oak, Quercus garryana. Fishing has historically been conducted within the lake, although golf course and other urban development around the perimeter has reduced these practices.

== Environmental factors ==
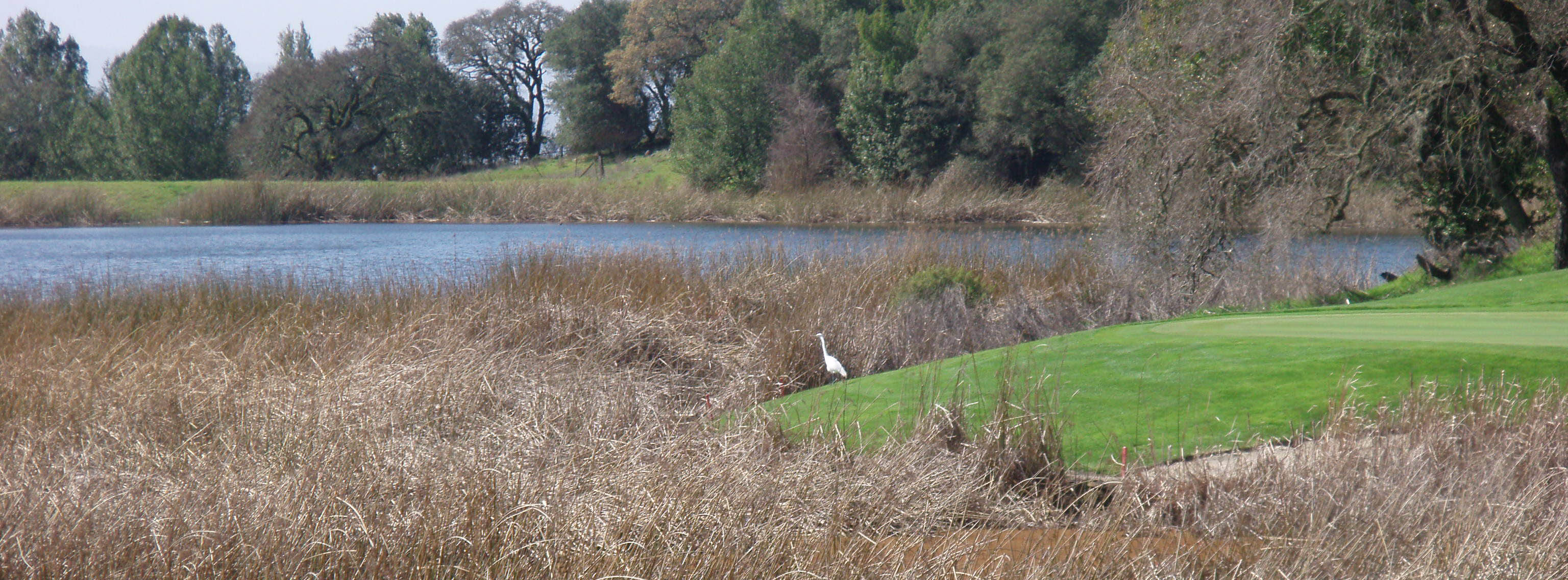
View of marshy perimeter of southern Fountaingrove Lake, with Great egret in evidence and a small element of the golf course.

The microclimate at Fountaingrove Lake is a mild Mediterranean climate typical of southern and central Sonoma County. Approximately 29.2 inches (74.2 cm) of precipitation occur at Fountaingrove Lake annually, almost entirely in the form of rainfall. The record high and low temperatures for this locale are 110 °F (43 °C) and 16 °F (-9 °C) respectively. Air quality is generally good since prevailing winds are from the northwest and intercept little industry as the winds travel from the Pacific Ocean. Sound levels have increased steadily with the growth of Santa Rosa, with the principal local sound source being Fountaingrove Parkway; sound levels from vehicles ascending the steep grades of that arterial can attain levels of 55 to 58 dBA at the environs of Fountaingrove Lake.

== Current issues ==
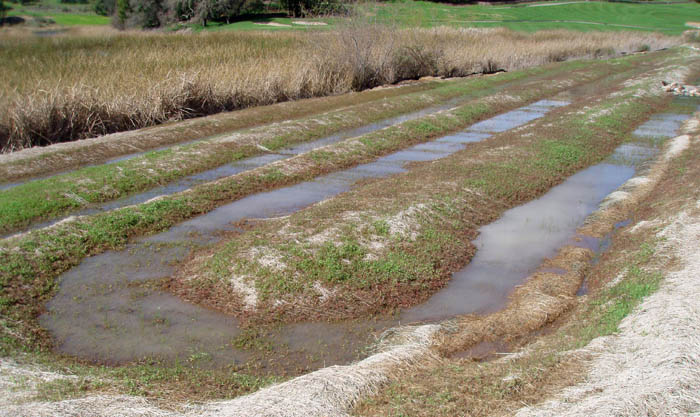
Sedimentation ponds at southern edge of Fountaingrove Lake to capture silt from construction disturbance of southern ridge.

Due to the Tubbs Fire, many of the surrounding neighborhoods were destroyed, along with some of the coastline of the lake.

A 500,000 US gal (1,900 kl) water storage tank was proposed near the southern end of Fountaingrove Lake; the city of Santa Rosa has approved this project to add to the municipal drinking water supply, subject to erosion control measures to protect Fountaingrove Lake from excessive siltation. A substantial retirement community known as Varenna is under development as of 2007 on the ridgetop at the southeastern perimeter of Fountaingrove Lake. The Varenna project had not made wetlands mitigation environmental filings in a timely manner with the California Regional Water Quality Control Board regarding certain filling of perimeter wetlands of Fountaingrove Lake associated with its development project; therefore, additionally off-site mitigation was required of the project to compensate the people of California for the wetlands destruction at Fountaingrove Lake. On site mitigation measures include extensive erosion protection for cut slopes and installation of bioswales.

== See also ==
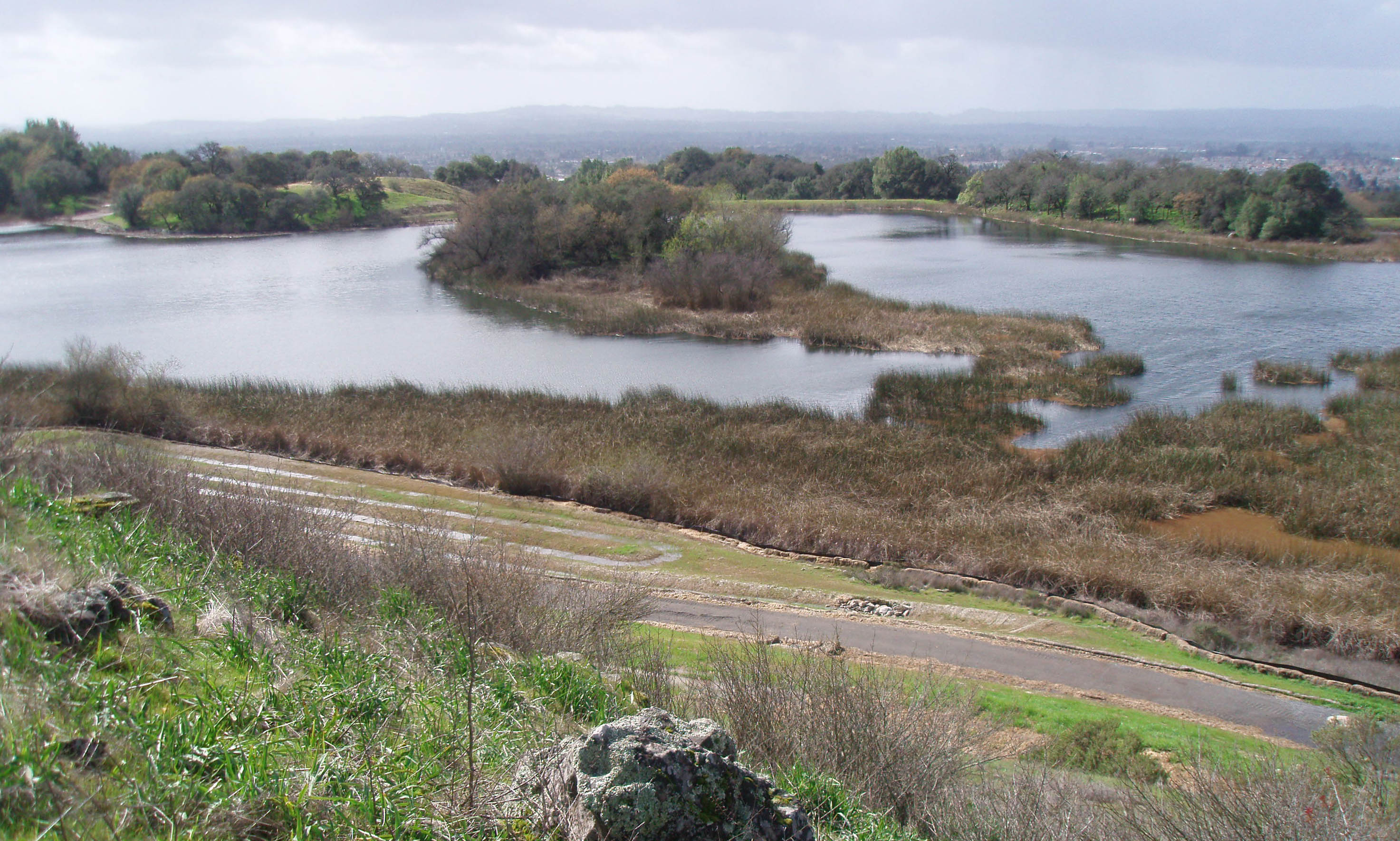
Fountaingrove Lake showing sedimentation ponds at edge of lake.

- List of lakes in California
- List of lakes in the San Francisco Bay Area
- Miwok
- Tule
- Wetland
