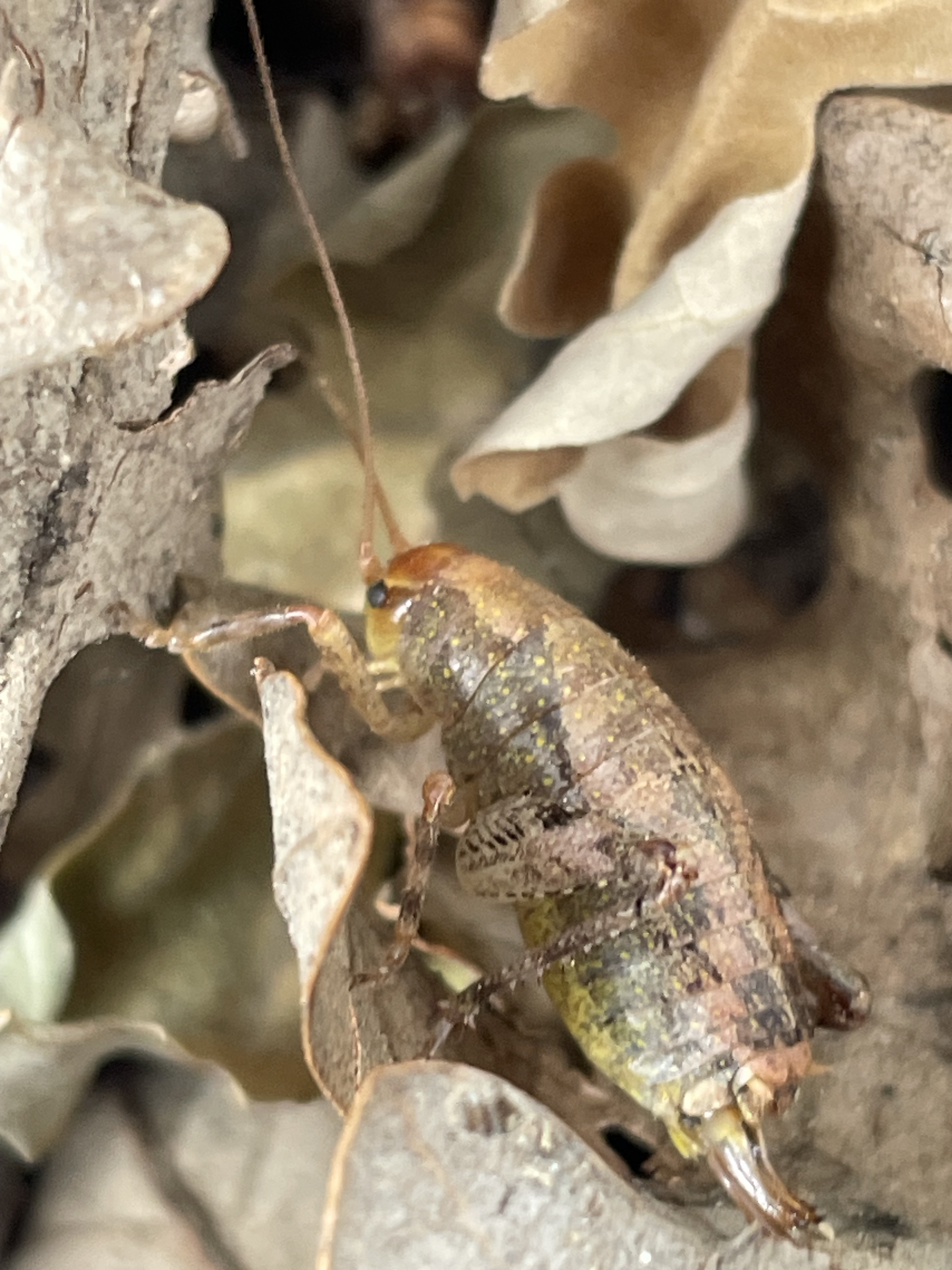
- A species of Gammarotettix in leaf litter

Scientific classification
- Domain: Eukaryota
- Kingdom: Animalia
- Phylum: Arthropoda
- Class: Insecta
- Order: Orthoptera
- Suborder: Ensifera
- Family: Rhaphidophoridae
- Subfamily: Gammarotettiginae
- Genus: Gammarotettix; Brunner, 1888

= Gammarotettix =

Genus of cricket-like animals

Gammarotettix is a North American genus of camel crickets in the family Rhaphidophoridae. They are also called chaparral camel crickets or arboreal camel crickets and are between 10–18 millimetres (0.39–0.71 in). They live mainly in California and possibly in southern Oregon and Arizona.

There are about six described species in Gammarotettix.

== Species ==
These six species belong to the genus Gammarotettix:

- Gammarotettix aesculus Strohecker, 1951
- Gammarotettix apache Rehn, 1940
- Gammarotettix bilobatus (Thomas, 1872)
- Gammarotettix bovis Rehn, 1941
- Gammarotettix cyclocercus Hebard, 1916
- Gammarotettix genitalis Caudell, 1916
