= Brush Creek (Sonoma County, California) =

Brush Creek Rincon Creek
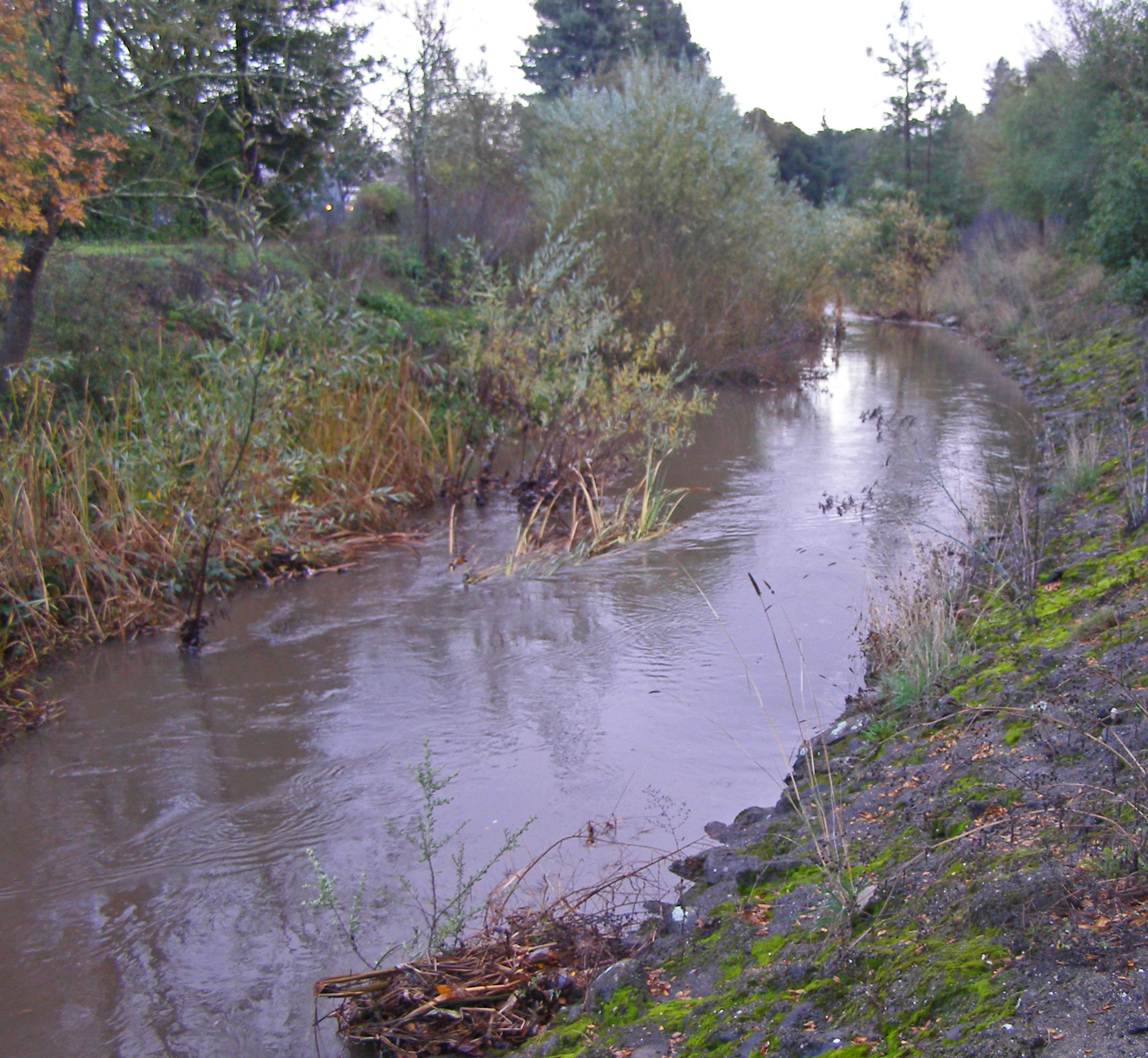
- Brush Creek looking south toward the Highway 12 bridge.

- Location of the mouth in California

Location
- Country: United States
- State: California
- Region: Sonoma County
- City: Santa Rosa, California

Physical characteristics
- Source
  - location: north of Santa Rosa, California
  - coordinates: 38°30′34″N 122°41′48″W
  - elevation: 577 ft (176 m)
- Mouth: Santa Rosa Creek
  - location: Santa Rosa, California
  - coordinates: 38°27′9″N 122°40′40″W
  - elevation: 210 ft (64 m)

Brush Creek or Rincon Creek is a tributary of Santa Rosa Creek in Sonoma County, California. Brush Creek rises in the southern slopes of the Mayacamas Mountains within Sonoma County. The lower reach of the creek is a suburban medium density residential area in the city of Santa Rosa, and that reach of Brush Creek has been restored during the 1990s under a U.S. Environmental Protection Agency grant to promote steelhead migration and spawning. Further restoration and incorporation into citywide park planning is currently underway as of 2006. The location of the confluence with Santa Rosa Creek is particularly noteworthy, since it was a locus of prehistoric life as a village of the Pomo people and a scenic geologic feature of massive flat boulder outcrops within the stream channel.

Brush Creek is a watercourse of approximately three miles in length that drains the area known as Rincon Valley in north Santa Rosa and the outlying unincorporated areas. The stream is shown on U.S. Geological Survey topographic maps as Rincon Creek. On current maps, Rincon Creek is a tributary that forms a confluence with Brush Creek approximately four kilometers upstream from the mouth of Brush Creek (near Montecito Boulevard). Thus today's nomenclature makes Rincon Creek essentially the west fork of upper Brush Creek.

== Lower reach and confluence with Santa Rosa Creek ==
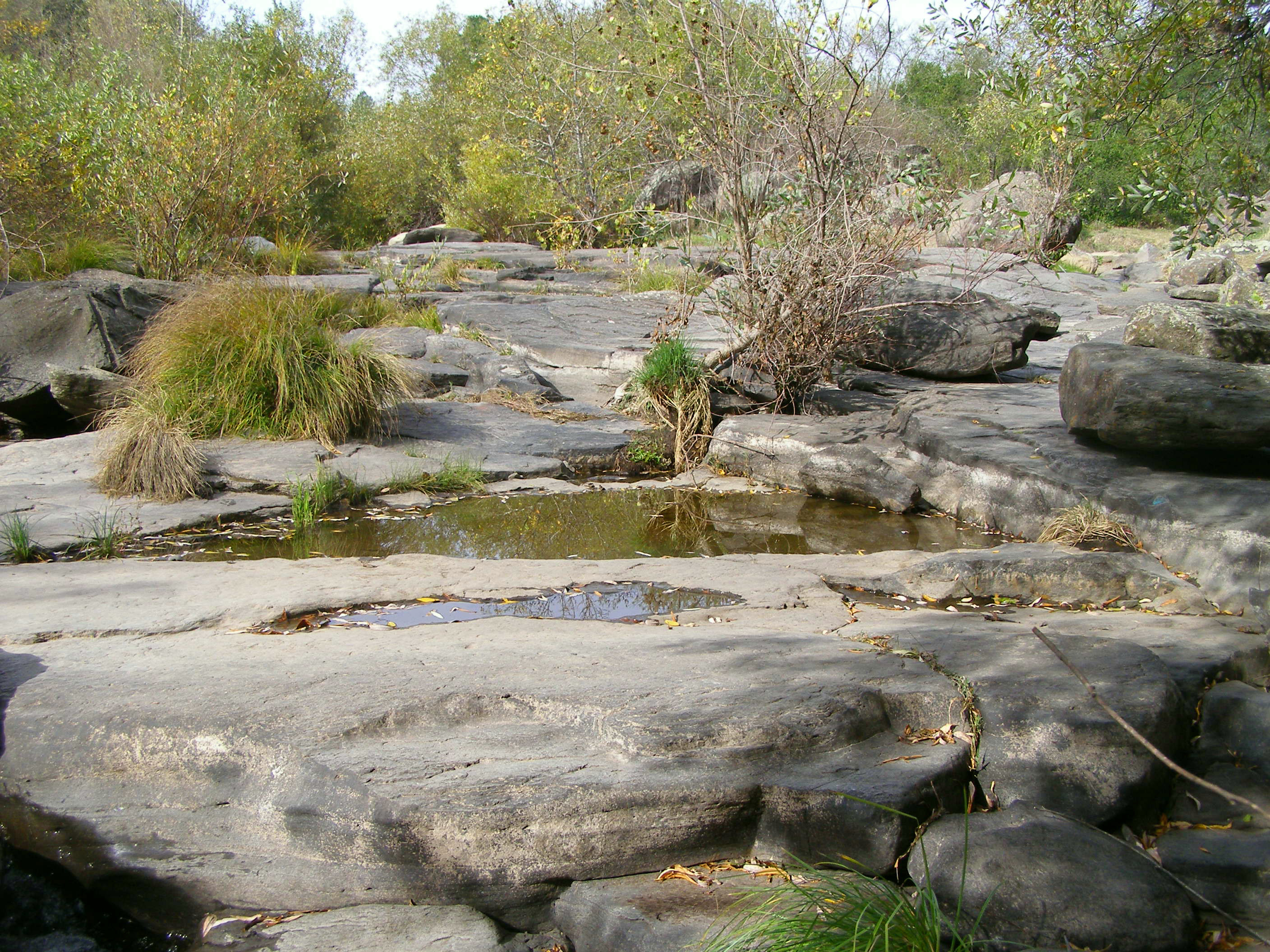
Flat Rocks boulder formation at the confluence Brush Creek into Santa Rosa Creek.

The Flat Rocks feature at the confluence with Santa Rosa Creek was an important element of the prehistoric Pomo village at this site and is currently a picturesque protected area for trail hikers to enjoy. Immediately above the confluence is a modified channel that was designed to allow encroachment by residential development. The open channel has an obvious geometric form where banks have been steepened from the natural original contours; nevertheless, there is considerable riparian vegetation of Arroyo willow and Broad-leaf cattail (Typha latifolia). Chief native trees along the banks are Coast live oak (Quercus agrifolia) and Garry oak (Quercus garryana).

Low flows at the end of summer amount to no more than a few cubic feet (50-100 liters) per second; however, after one of the first rains of autumn of approximately 1 in (3 cm), the flow increases to about 120 cu ft (3 m^{3}) per second. Substantial energy dissipation is achieved by the willows and cattails that choke the creek in this reach. The sides are partially armored with asphalt to achieve stabilization of the unnatural slope and to minimize scouring and erosion. In this reach of Brush Creek, Ducker Creek joins from the east and a west fork of Brush Creek forms a confluence somewhat higher from the west.

Soils comprising the streambed of upper and lower reaches are classified as the riverwash series in the U.S. Soil Conservation Service Classification System. These materials according to the U.S. Department of Agriculture, consist of recent deposition of gravel and silt alluvium along streams. Layering of soils and gravels brought in from higher elevations has resulted to form the streambed.

== Upper reach ==
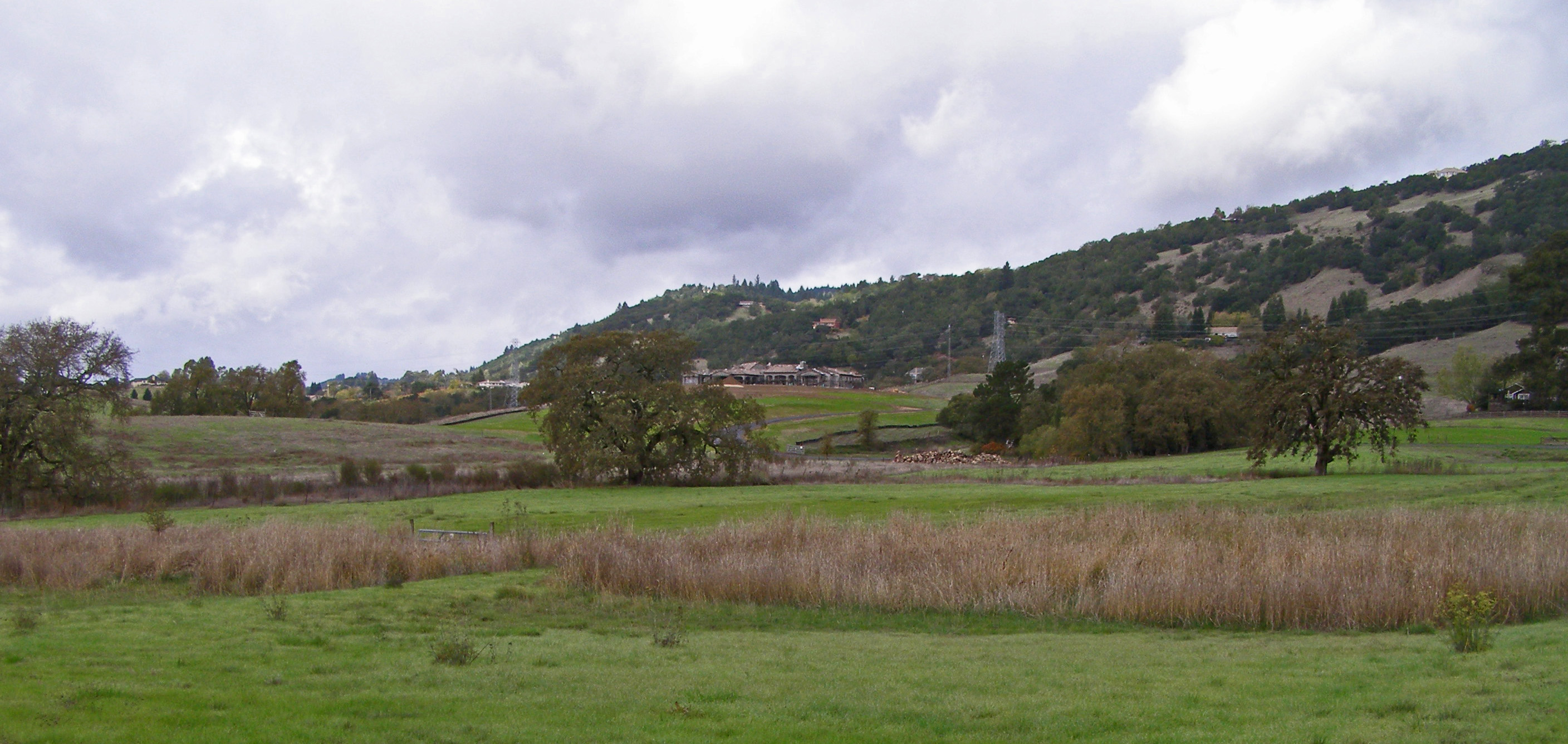
Upper reach of Brush Creek watershed

The upper reach may be defined as that portion of the watershed above Montecito Boulevard, most of which is in the unincorporated area of Sonoma County. In these reaches the creek has little modification, save for residential development along Anderson Drive which encroaches into the riparian area. Thus there are no flood control channel improvements, other than the Middle Fork Brush Creek reservoir constructed near Saddle Creek Drive. Above Badger Road there is a dam across Brush Creek, forming this small reservoir. Headwaters of Brush Creek flow into the reservoir from two forks. There is virtually no public access to the creek or reservoir in the upper reach. There is less cattail vegetation and more mature Garry oaks and Valley oaks in this reach. Above Baird the landscape turns into chiefly agricultural grazing land in the lower foothills of the Mayacmas western slopes.

== See also ==
- Coho salmon
- List of watercourses in the San Francisco Bay Area
