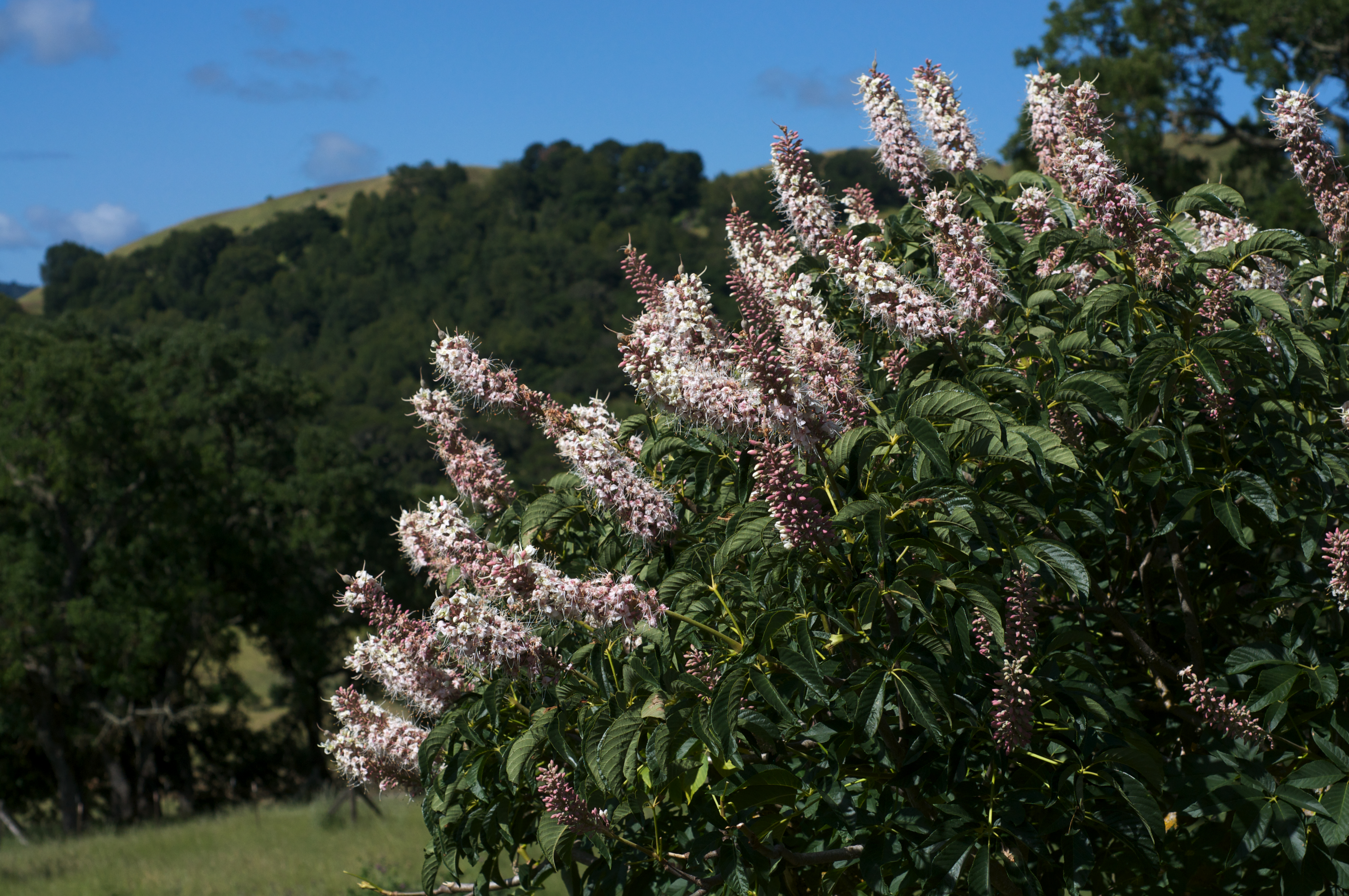

Conservation status
- Least Concern (IUCN 3.1)

- Secure (NatureServe)

Scientific classification
- Kingdom: Plantae
- Clade: Tracheophytes
- Clade: Angiosperms
- Clade: Eudicots
- Clade: Rosids
- Order: Sapindales
- Family: Sapindaceae
- Genus: Aesculus
- Species: A. californica

Binomial name
- Aesculus californica (Spach) Nutt.
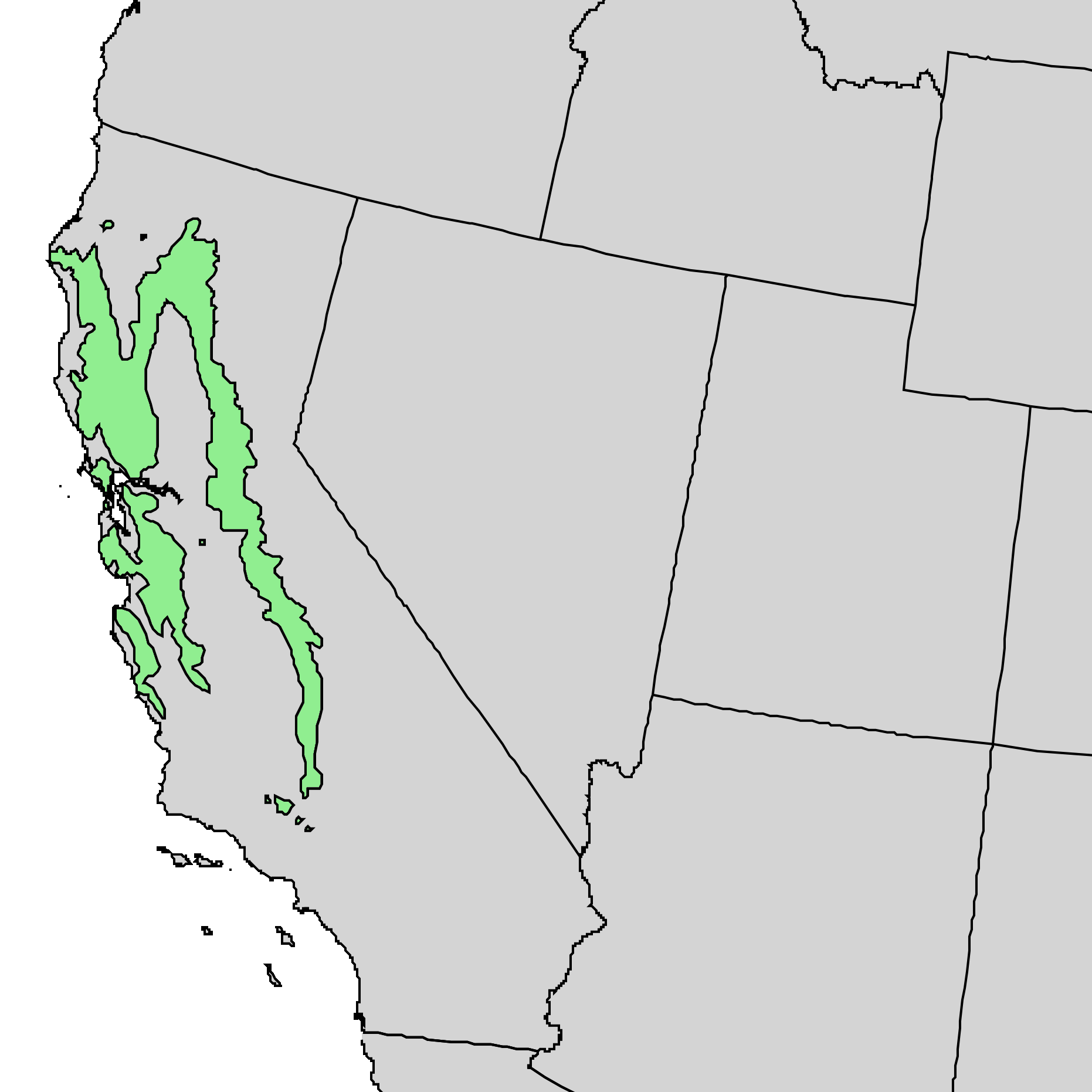
- Natural range

= Aesculus californica =

Species of plant

Aesculus californica, commonly known as the California buckeye or California horse-chestnut, is a species of flowering plant in the soapberry family (Sapindaceae) native primarily to California and southwestern Oregon. It is a large shrub or small tree, often with several trunks and a broad, rounded crown. It has palmately compound leaves that bloom early in spring, followed by erect clusters of white to pale pink flowers in late spring and large, pear shaped fruit capsules in late summer.

California buckeye is drought deciduous: in drier, more inland areas, its leaves commonly fall off and die during late summer, while specimens in moister coastal environments retain their leaves longer into autumn. The large, glossy seeds and other parts of the plant contain toxic glycoside compounds.

== Description ==
Aesculus californica is a large deciduous shrub or small tree, up to 4–12 m (13–39 ft) tall. It typically is multi-trunked, with a crown as broad or broader than it is high. The bark is light gray and smooth.

The leaves are opposite, and palmately compound with five (rarely seven) leaflets. The individual leaflets are 6–17 cm (2.4–6.7 in) long, with a finely serrated margin and pointed tips. The leaves are dark green above and paler on the underside and may have downy veins.

The flowers are borne on dense, erect panicles 15–20 cm (6–8 in) long and 5–8 cm (2–3 in) broad. They are fragrant, white to pale pink, and individual flowers are 1-2.5cm long. Each flower has a two-lobed calyx 5-8mm long, and 4, sometimes 5, petals. Five to seven stamens project conspicuously beyond the petals. This species is andromonoecious, with the inflorescences producing both staminate and bisexual flowers on the same plant. Only the bisexual flowers are capable of developing into fruit.

The fruit is a smooth, leathery pear-shaped capsule 5–8 cm (2–3 in) long. As it matures, the capsule turns brown and splits, revealing one large, glossy brown seed, measuring 2–7 cm (0.8–2.8 in). The seeds are poisonous.

Detail of the leaves

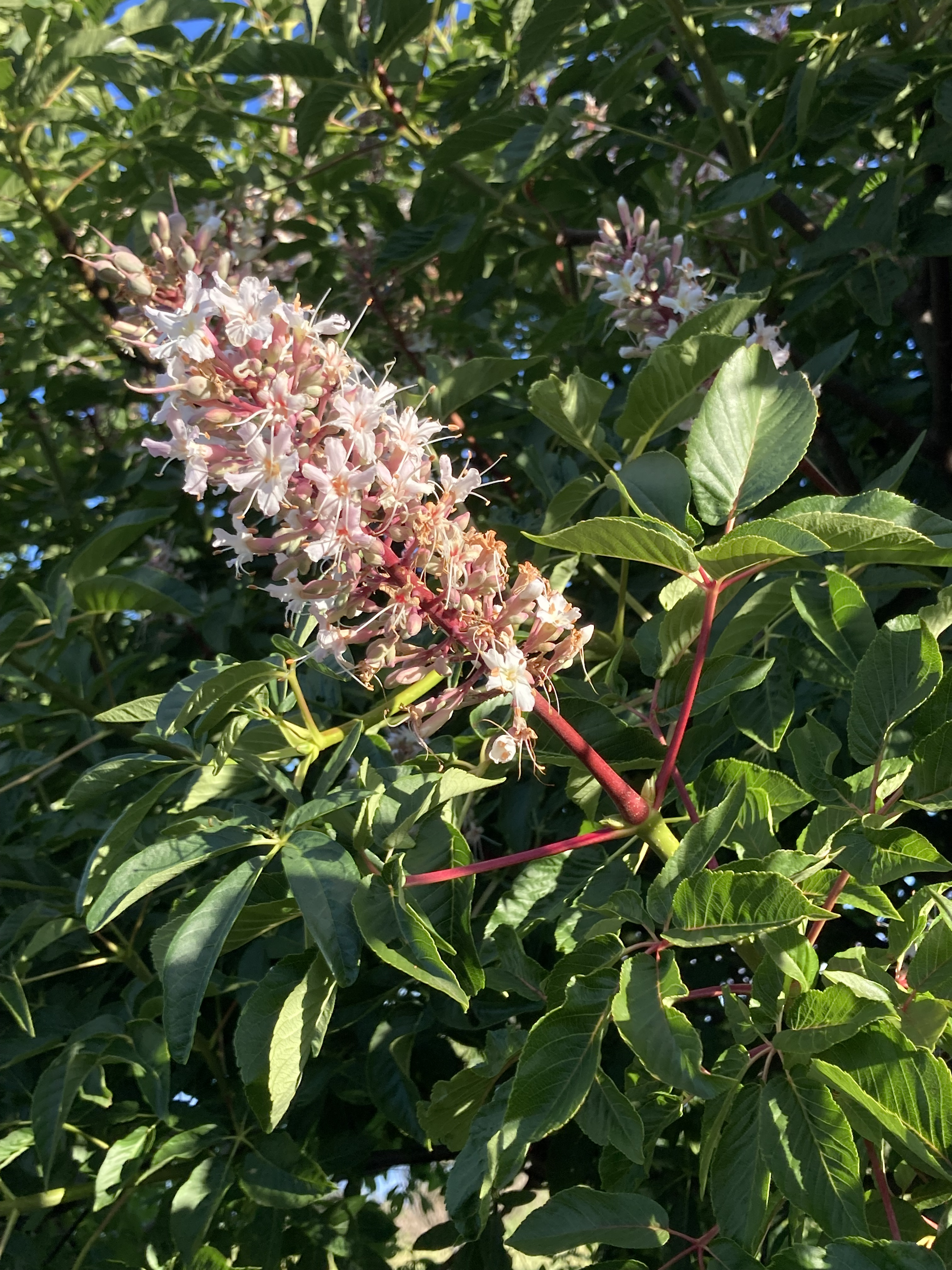
A single panicle

Fruit maturing in late summer

A. californica with senescent leaves in late summer on Mount Diablo

California buckeye has adapted to its native Mediterranean climate by having an earlier growing season that tracks the availability of moisture. It is among the earliest native woody plants in its range to produce new leaves in spring, and likewise one of the earliest to lose its leaves in late summer. In dry inland populations, the leaves commonly senesce in late spring or summer and are shed as soil moisture evaporates. Those growing in coastal regions tend to hold on to their leaves until mid-autumn.

Research on seasonal water potential in the California buckeye has found that it usually experiences small seasonal declines in leaf water versus other woody plants. The research study examined three species growing in a drought habitat, and the California buckeye showed smaller changes in water potential than the other two plants: the evergreen toyon (Heteromeles arbutifolia) and winter-deciduous western redbud (Cercis occidentalis). The difference in water potential can be attributed to the species’ different seasonal strategies in adjusting to a water drought.

== Distribution and habitat ==
California Buckeye is the only Aesculus species native to the western United States. A. californica is widely distributed in California, growing in the Klamath Mountains and California Coast Ranges from the Siskiyou Mountains south to Los Angeles County and in the Cascade Range and lower elevations of the Sierra Nevada from Shasta County to Kern County. A small, disjunct population occurs near Gold Hill in the Rogue Valley in Jackson County, Oregon, separated from the California populations by quite a distance.

This species grows in a wide range of conditions: dry slopes, in canyons and along streams generally at low to middle elevations below 1700m. It occurs as scattered individuals in grasslands, as an understory shrub in mixed evergreen forests, and as a component or local dominant of chaparral and oak woodlands. In the coastal ranges north of Big Sur, it is found growing alone on slopes, or intermingled with valley oak (Quercus lobata), Oregon oak (Q. garryana), coast live oak (Q. agrifolia) and California bay laurel (Umbellularia californica). In the foothills of the Sierra Nevada, A. californica can be found standing alone in grassland at the lowest elevations, intermingled in blue oak woodlands at intermediate elevations, and in mixed evergreen forests of black oak (Q. kelloggii), gray pine (Pinus sabiniana), ponderosa pine (P. ponderosa) and interior live oak (Q. wislizeni) as it nears the limit of its range.

California buckeye can regrow after fire by producing new shoots from its root crown, which is the area where the root meets the stem. Even though fire can kill the buckeye’s above-ground stems, surviving root crowns enable it to recover. New shoots can emerge in a matter of weeks after a fire, and growth during the subsequent season can be rapid as the plant uses stored nutrient reserves in its robust root system. The buckeye seeds are considered unlikely to survive direct exposure to fire since they are vulnerable to heat-related drying.

The Buckeye seeds can disperse mainly by gravity or water, while dispersal by animals is rare. The seeds usually remain viable for only one year. Under good conditions, they can germinate within several weeks of being shed; however prolonged exposure to low soil temperatures can increase their vulnerability to fungal infection or drying out.

In terms of susceptibility, California buckeye is vulnerable to leaf blight caused by the fungus Boeremia lilacis. The disease has been found on buckeye in California nurseries and watered landscapes. Symptoms of this disease include leaf spots that can expand toward the midvein, leaf blight, and premature leaf fall. In pathogenicity experiments, researchers reproduced leaf spot symptoms by inoculating potted California buckeye plants with the toxic fungus, proving it causes the disease.

== Toxicity and uses ==
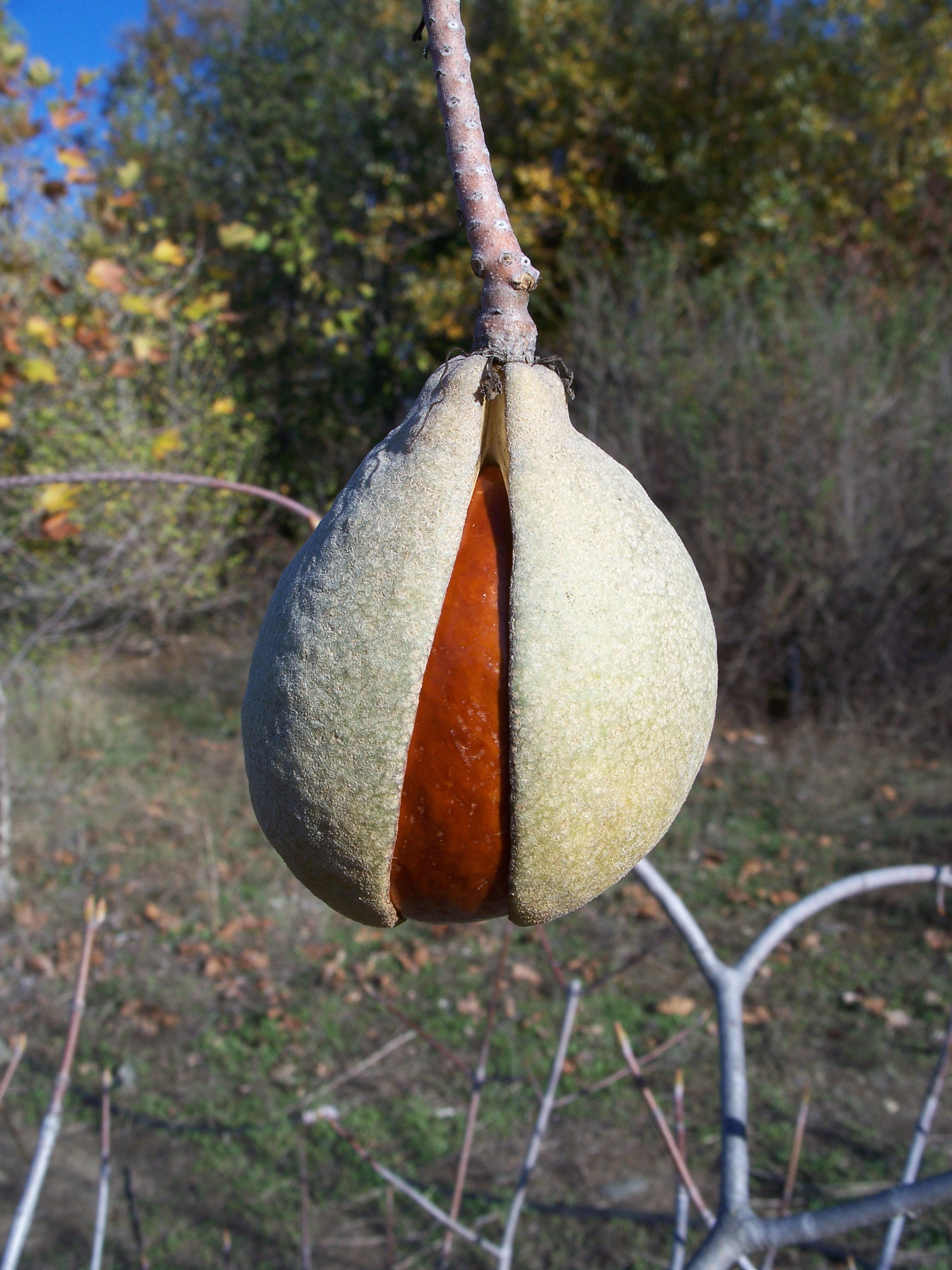
Seed of the California Buckeye in its husk

Indigenous peoples of California, including the Pomo, Yokuts, and Luiseño communities, used the poisonous nuts and seeds to stupefy schools of fish in small streams to make them easier to catch.

Diving deeper into the toxic seeds, research has found that buckeye seeds can sometimes germinate even after being partially eaten by predators such as rodents. In a greenhouse experiment, about 53% of seeds that had been invaded by rodents germinated, versus approximately 98% of undamaged seeds. Even though damaged seeds were less likely to germinate and produced smaller seedlings, some seeds with a good amount of damage still managed to grow. Mendoza and Dirzo suggested that the seeds’ large size and stored food reserves may help them handle predator tampering.

The bark, leaves, and fruits contain neurotoxic glycosides, which cause hemolysis of red blood cellswhen ingested. Buckeye also makes a good fireboard for a bow drill or hand drill.

Native groups occasionally used the plant as a food supply; after boiling and leaching the toxin out of the seeds or nut meats for several days, they could be ground into a flour or meal similar to that made from acorns. The nectar and pollen of the flowers are toxic to honeybees, so the trees should not be planted near apiaries. When the shoots are small and leaves are new, they are lower in toxins and are grazed by livestock and wildlife. The flowers are a rich nectar source for many species of butterflies, and squirrels and chipmunks consume the seeds. Hydroquinone and epicatechin have been isolated from the seeds and have been shown to have allelopathic properties by inhibiting plant growth.

It is used as an ornamental plant for its striking leaf buds, lime green foliage, fragrant white flowers, red-brown foliage in mid to late summer, and architectural silver branches through fall. The tree also acts as a soil binder, which prevents erosion in hilly regions.

== Etymology ==
The genus 'Aesculus' is Linnaeus' name for horse chestnuts. It is derived from the old Roman name for a different species, Quercus petraea.

The species name 'Californica' means 'native to California'.

== Gallery ==
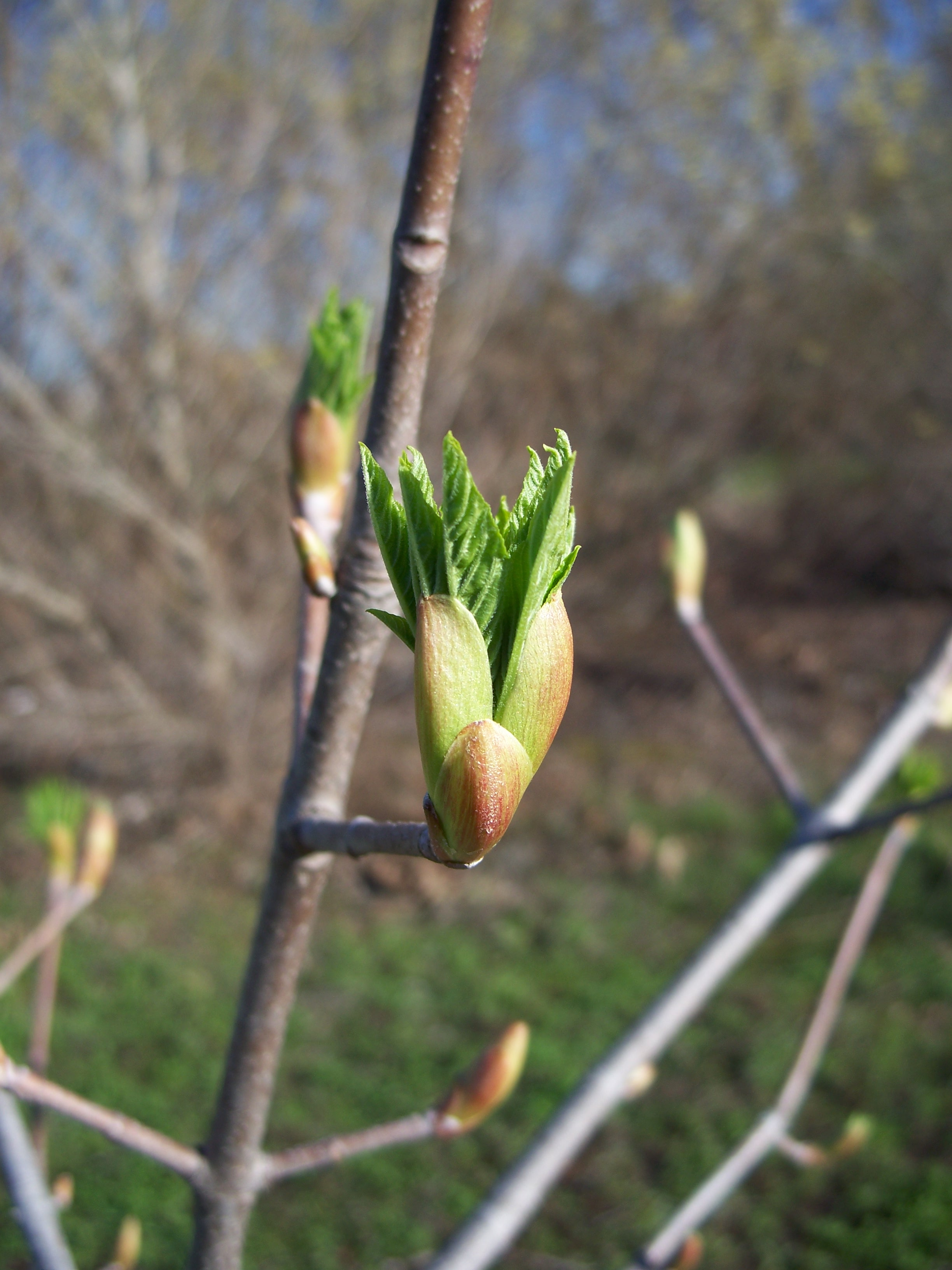
Buds opening in February

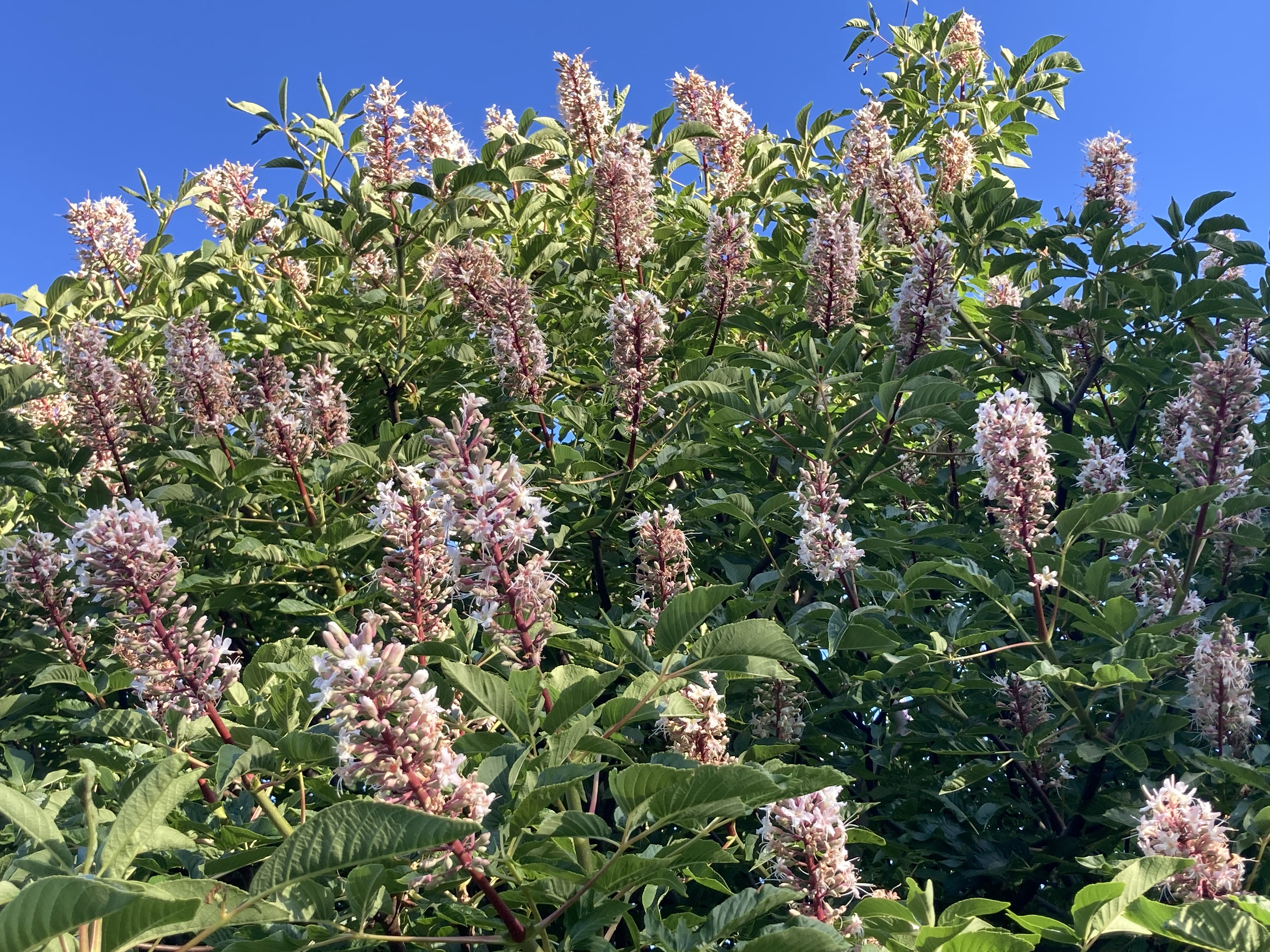
The tree is often covered in panicles

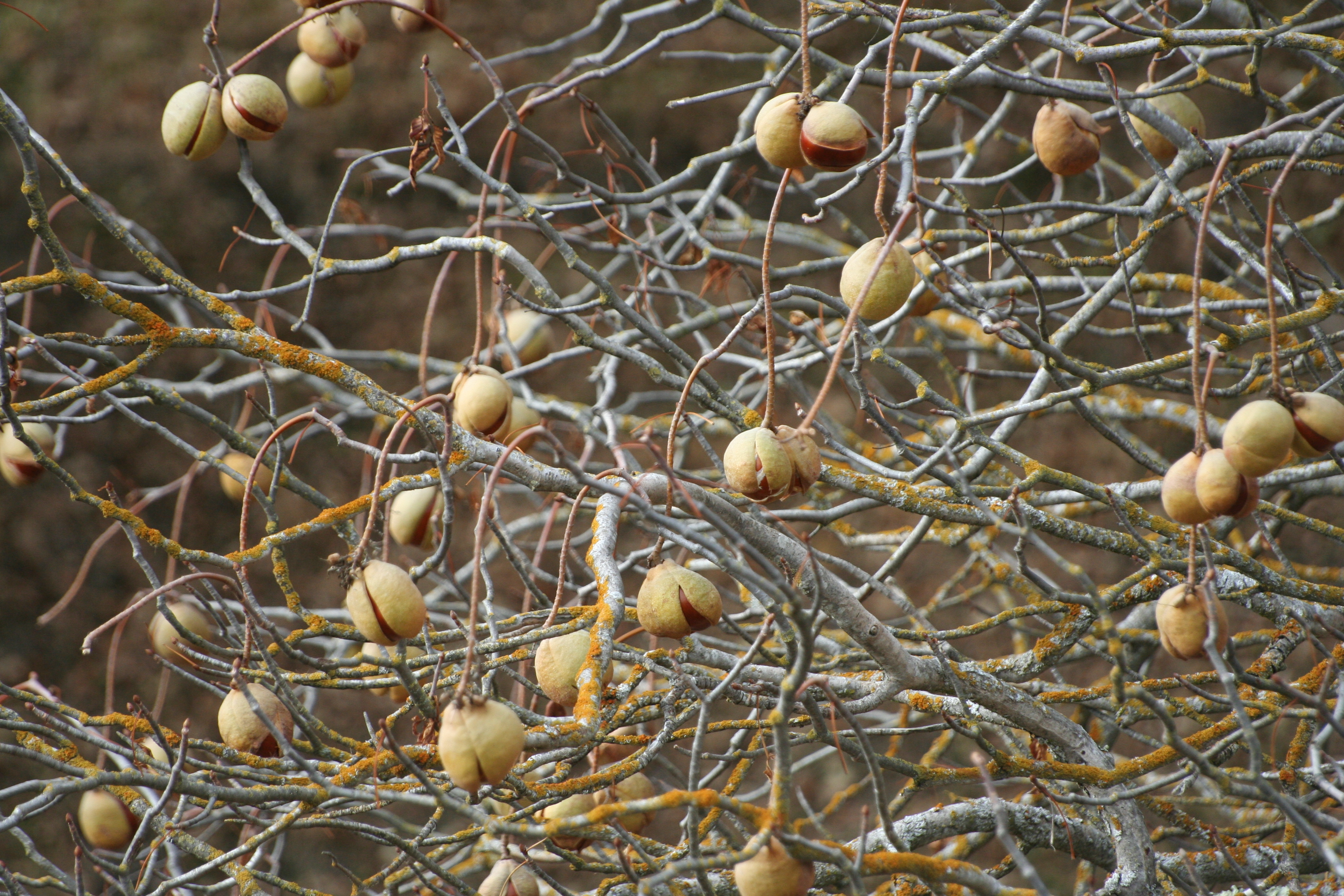
Buckeye husks split open (November)

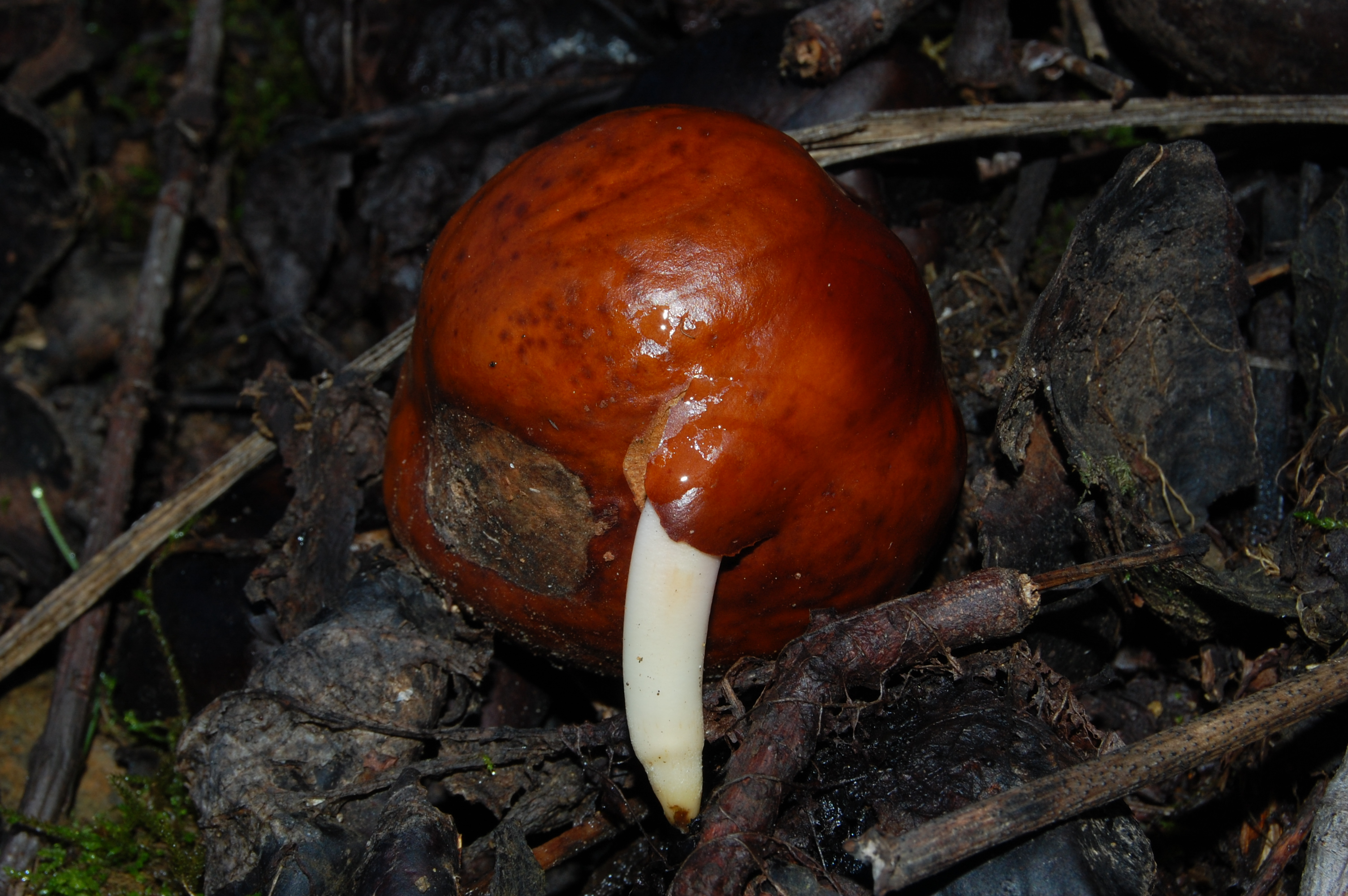
Buckeye sprouting (January)
