= Bennett Valley =

Valley in California, United States

Coordinates: 38°24′15″N 122°38′05″W

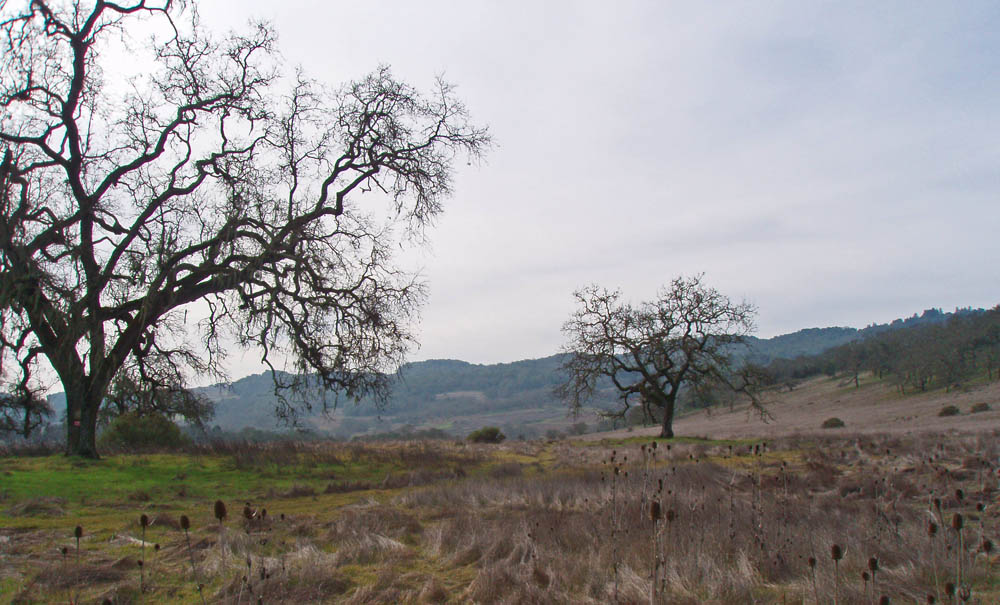
View across pastureland from the center of Bennett Valley with Sonoma Mountains in background.

Bennett Valley is a northwest- to southeast-trending valley in Sonoma County, California, US, approximately 1 mile (1.6 km) wide in its northwestern portion, where the southeast extremity of Santa Rosa, California is located. The axis of the valley floor slopes 40 feet (12 m) per mile (a gradient of 0.008 or 7.6 m per km) from the pinched central portion of the valley, where knolls divide the northwestern from the southeastern segment of the valley. Bennett Valley is drained by Matanzas Creek which is incised into the valley floor; an unnamed stream and Spring Creek drain into Matanzas Creek from the east side of Bennett Valley below the Matanzas Creek Reservoir. A flood-control reservoir on Matanzas Creek in the central portion of the valley collects water from the drainage of the upper portion of the valley. Precipitation in the valley varies from approximately 35 to 40 inches (90 to 100 cm) per year. The latter amount falls on Taylor Mountain, located immediately above Bennett Valley, in an outlier spur of the Sonoma Mountains sometimes called the Los Gullicos Range. Rainfall occurs primarily during winters (November to April), separated by warm dry summers. Bennett Valley is accessed chiefly via Bennett Valley Road, which traverses the valley floor to connect southeast Santa Rosa with Warm Springs Road in Glen Ellen.

== Ecology ==
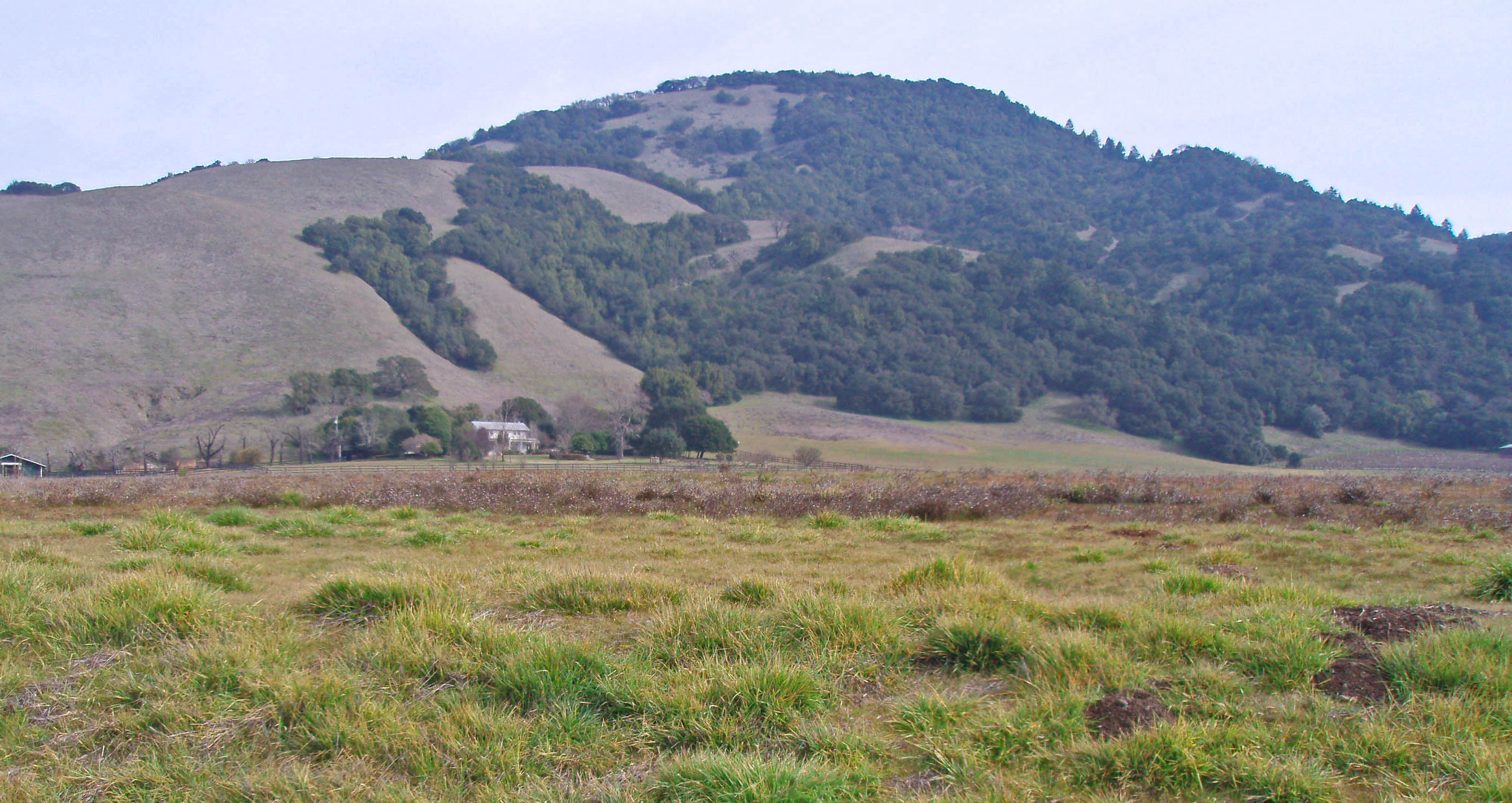
Bennett Mountain viewed from the center of Bennett Valley.

Both the upper southwest and northeast sideslopes of Bennett Valley have significant oak woodland. Both forested areas have dominant trees that include coast live oak. On the lower slopes and northern valley floor there are considerable numbers of valley oak in relict stands, from a previous dominant cover of these lower elevations prior to agricultural development of the valley floor. According to the 1990 report of Earth Metrics, a large percentage of valley oaks near Bennett Valley Road at the northwest end of Bennett Valley were infested with oak apple gall. Gall wasps of the family Cynipidae produce a single sexual generation within a structure that resembles an apple. Some valley oaks on the site are infested with these "fruits," and on first glance appear as apple trees. This infestation is considered mild, and should not affect the oaks' ability to survive. Some valley oaks in this area were also noticeably infested with dwarf mistletoe in the 1990 survey. This facultative epiphytic parasite can lead to the detriment of oak trees if allowed to persist and spread among trees

== Soils ==
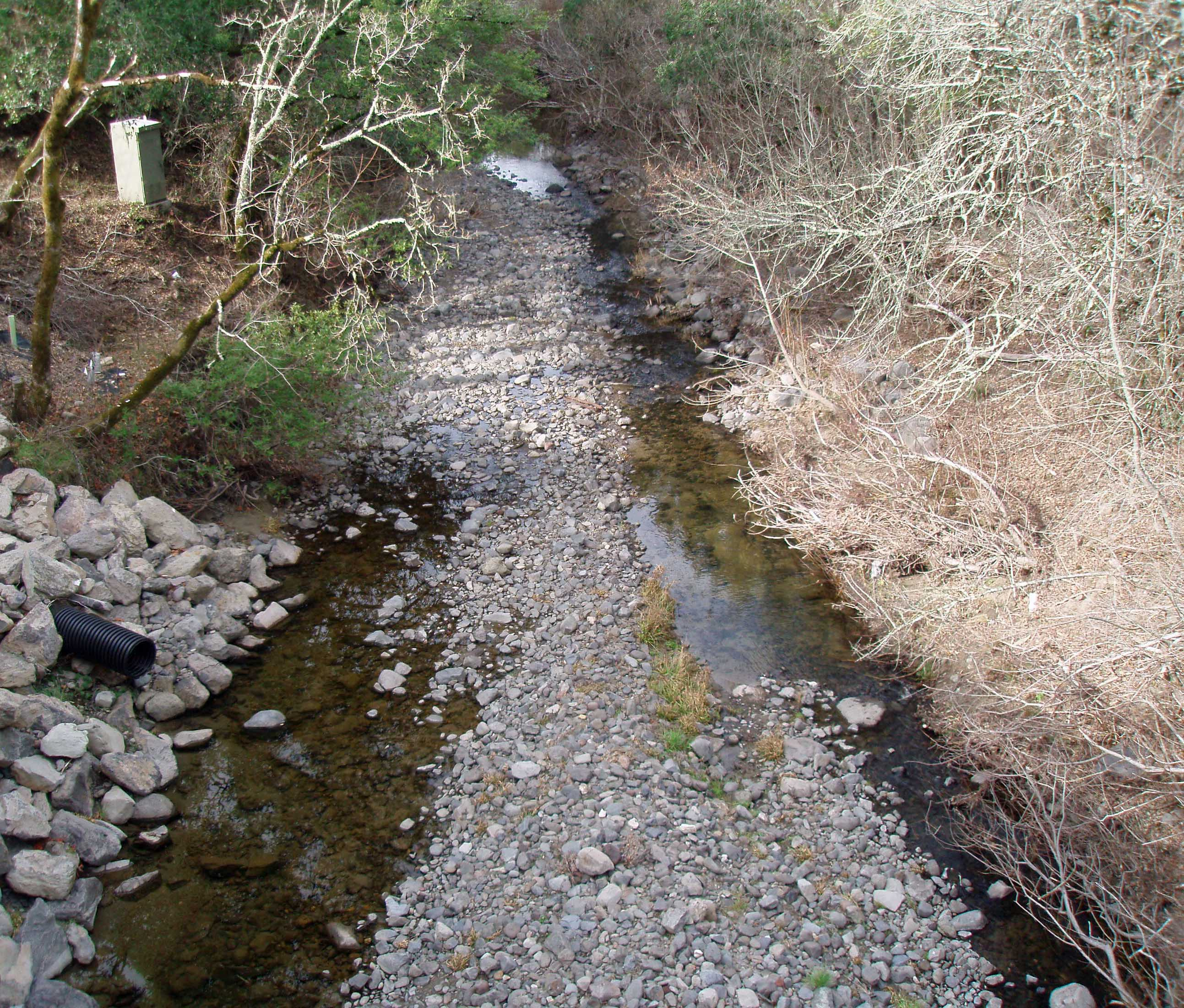
Matanzas Creek draining the floor of Bennett Valley.

The dominant surface soil category of Bennett Valley is Clear Lake clay, a soil type occurring here on slopes ranging from zero to two percent gradient. Clear Lake clay is poorly drained and occurs on long smooth flood plains. Clear Lake clay is found on both sides of Matanzas Creek, which flows northwesterly along the axis of Bennett Valley. Clear Lake clay is dark gray in appearance and manifests a fine to medium granular structure, most commonly supporting hay production in the Bennett Valley. In addition, Zamora silty clay loam is found in several large patches on the valley floor; Zamora silty clay loam is a grayish brown firm, sticky and plastic soil type and is also characteristic of alluvial fans; it has a neutral pH and occurs at minimum depths of about two meters. Due to the economic demand for wine grapes in this region, pressure began in the 1980s to develop some of the Bennett Valley soils for viticulture.

== Luxury residential and vineyard growth ==
Economic factors of land scarcity for upscale residential development and for premium wine grape cultivation led to an explosion of land values in Bennett Valley starting in the 1980s. This trend is shaped by policies of the County of Sonoma, which discourage small lot residential development in Bennett Valley. These effects have led to a decrease in available natural habitat as well as decreased area available for hay farming and pasture usage. Some of the grapes are used locally for wine production such as in the case of the Matanzas Creek Winery, while some are sold to production facilities elsewhere in Sonoma County. As a result of this recognition of the Bennett Valley viticulture as a premium wine-grape region, an American Viticultural Area named Bennett Valley AVA was proposed and established in 2003.

Residential development has emphasized new construction of custom homes typically built on parcels ranging from five to 40 acres (160,000 m^{2}). Most of these homes are of the size range greater than 3,500 square feet (330 m^{2}) and characteristic values of these newer homes as of 2007 are in the range of $1.5 to 3.0 million. Most of the Bennett Valley housing stock is nevertheless of more modest pre-1980 characteristics.

== See also ==
- Bennett Valley AVA
- Miwok
