= Santa Rosa Creek Reservoir =

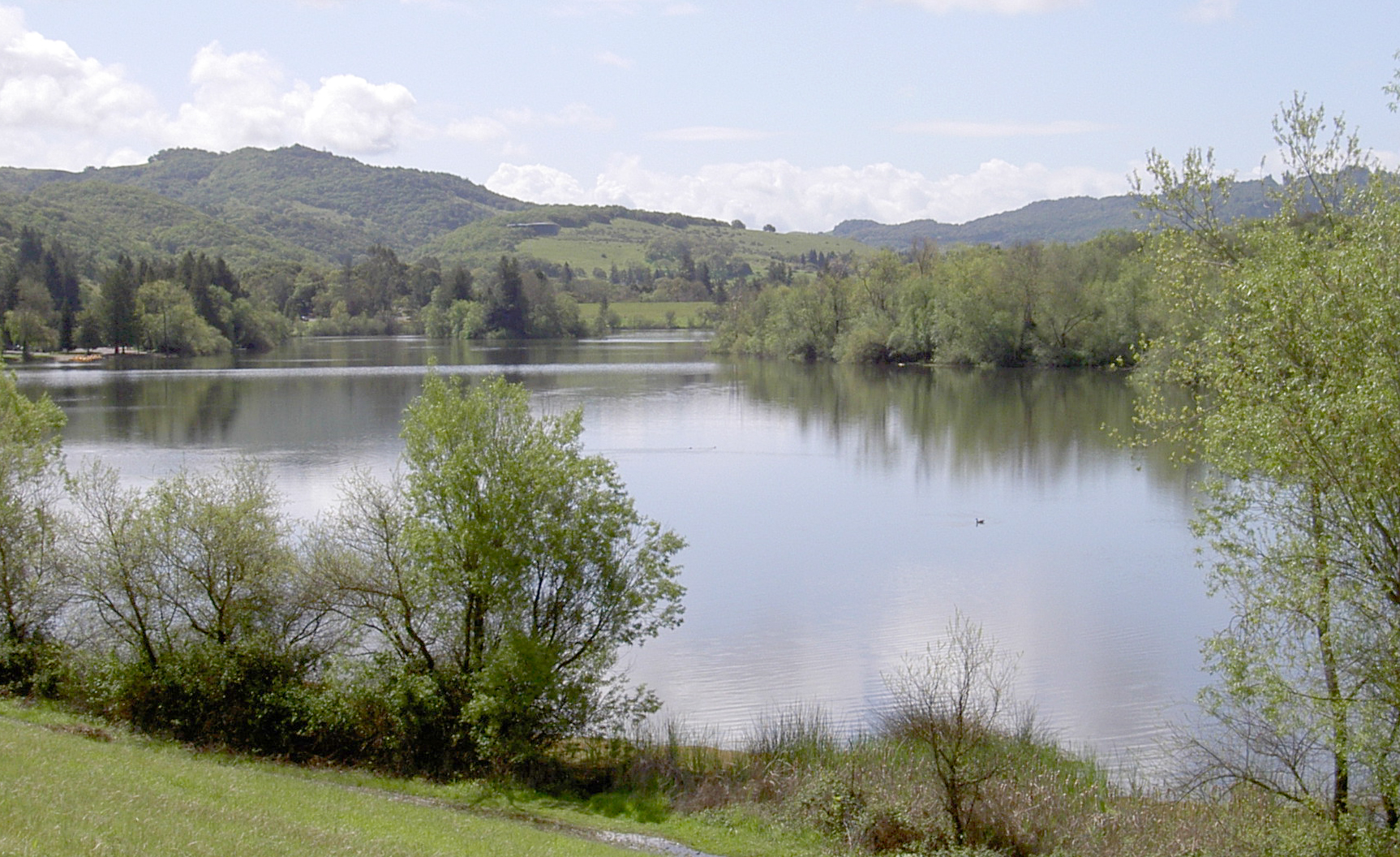
- viewed from the north, 2010

- Location within California Location within the United States
- Location: Sonoma County, California
- Coordinates: 38°27′18″N 122°39′11″W
- Type: Reservoir
- Primary outflows: a tributary of Spring Creek
- Catchment area: 0.55 sq mi (1.4 km^{2})
- Basin countries: United States
- Surface area: 154 acres (62 ha)
- Water volume: 3,550 acre⋅ft (4,380,000 m^{3})
- Surface elevation: 292 ft (89 m)
- Settlements: Santa Rosa

Santa Rosa Creek Reservoir is a reservoir in Spring Lake Regional Park in the city of Santa Rosa, California, USA. It is impounded by an earthen dam built in 1963 (63 years ago) and owned by the Sonoma County Water Agency.

== See also ==
- Lake Ralphine
- List of lakes in California
- List of lakes in the San Francisco Bay Area
- List of reservoirs and dams in California
- List of Sonoma County Regional Parks facilities
