= Lake Ilsanjo =

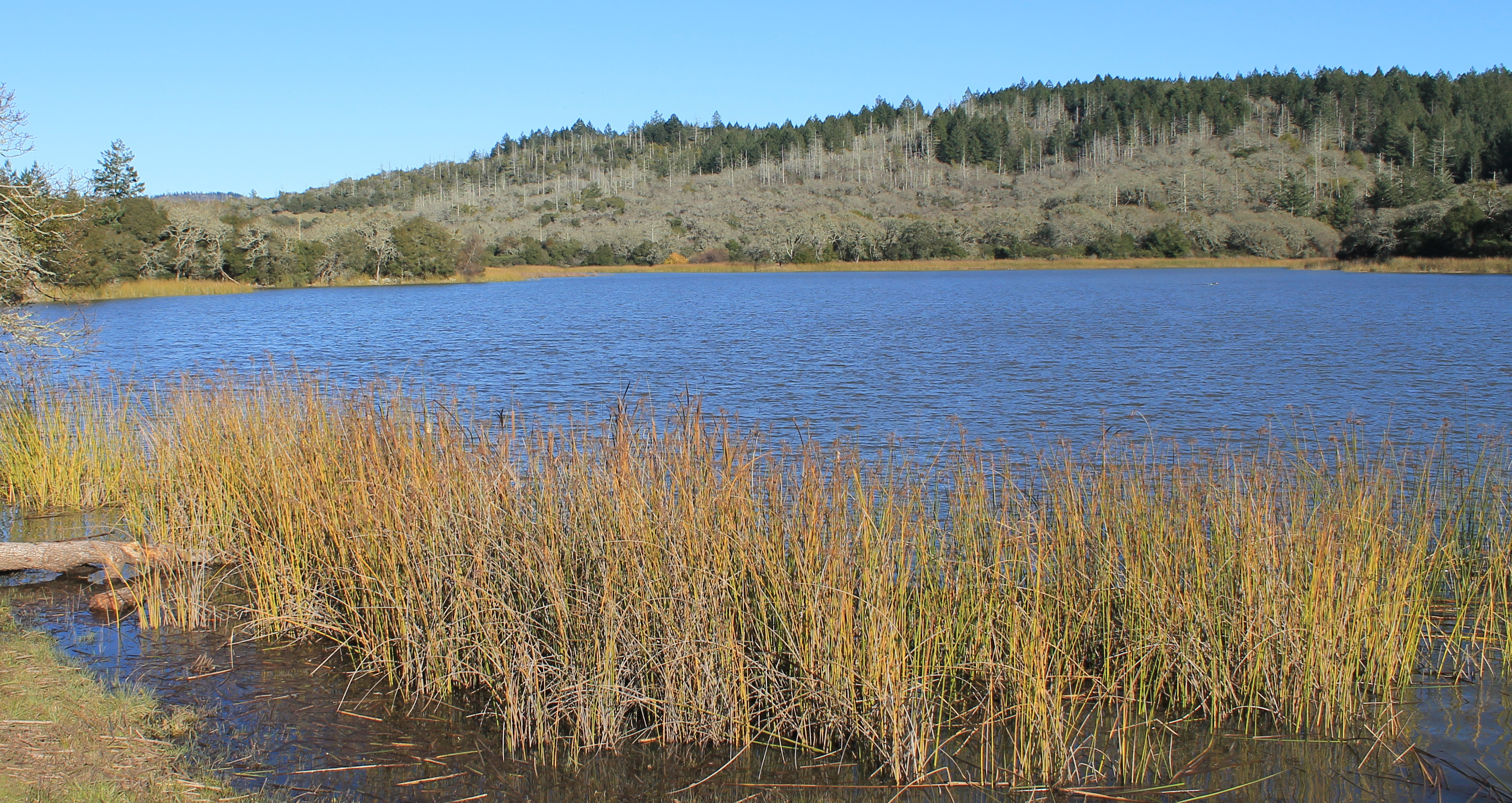
- The lake in 2013

- Location within California
- Location: Sonoma County, California
- Coordinates: 38°25′37″N 122°38′00″W
- Type: Reservoir
- Primary inflows: Spring Creek
- Primary outflows: Spring Creek
- Basin countries: United States
- Max. length: 650 yd (600 m)

Lake Ilsanjo is a man-made lake located in Annadel State Park east of Santa Rosa in Sonoma County, California, United States. It is a place for fishing and swimming, especially in the summer months. Entrepreneur Joe Coney originally owned the land that is now Annadel State Park and built the lake in the mid-1950s, naming it after his wife Ilsa and himself. It drains into Spring Creek. Coney sold the land to California State Parks in 1969, and it became a state park in 1971.

The lake is formed by a dam constructed in the 1950s. Originally the overflow drained to a gully during the winter months, but in 2003, the state spent almost $400,000 building a spillway and release valve to reduce downstream erosion. During the winter of 2007–08, park officials accidentally left the release valve open, causing the lake level to drop far below normal, exposing mudflats that would normally be underwater.

== See also ==
- Ledson Marsh
- List of lakes in California
- List of lakes in the San Francisco Bay Area
