= Southeast Greenway =

Park in Santa Rosa, California, United States

- Interactive map of Southeast Greenway
- Type: urban park
- Location: Santa Rosa, California
- Coordinates: 38.441°N 122.670°W
- Area: 47 acres (19 ha)
- Operator: City of Santa Rosa

The Southeast Greenway is an urban park on the eastern edge of Santa Rosa, California. Beginning in the 1950s, land was purchased by the California Department of Transportation to build a freeway alignment for California State Route 12 through eastern Santa Rosa. As local awareness of climate change shifted priorities toward active transportation alternatives, the city purchased the land to build a 2-mile (3.2 km) pedestrian and bicycle path from the eastern end of the route 12 freeway to Spring Lake Regional Park. Land adjacent to this active transportation corridor will be used for water supply and utility infrastructure with space for community gardens, dog parks, disc golf, sports courts, fields, and playgrounds.
