= McDonald Mansion =

Historic house in California, United States

- U.S. National Register of Historic Places
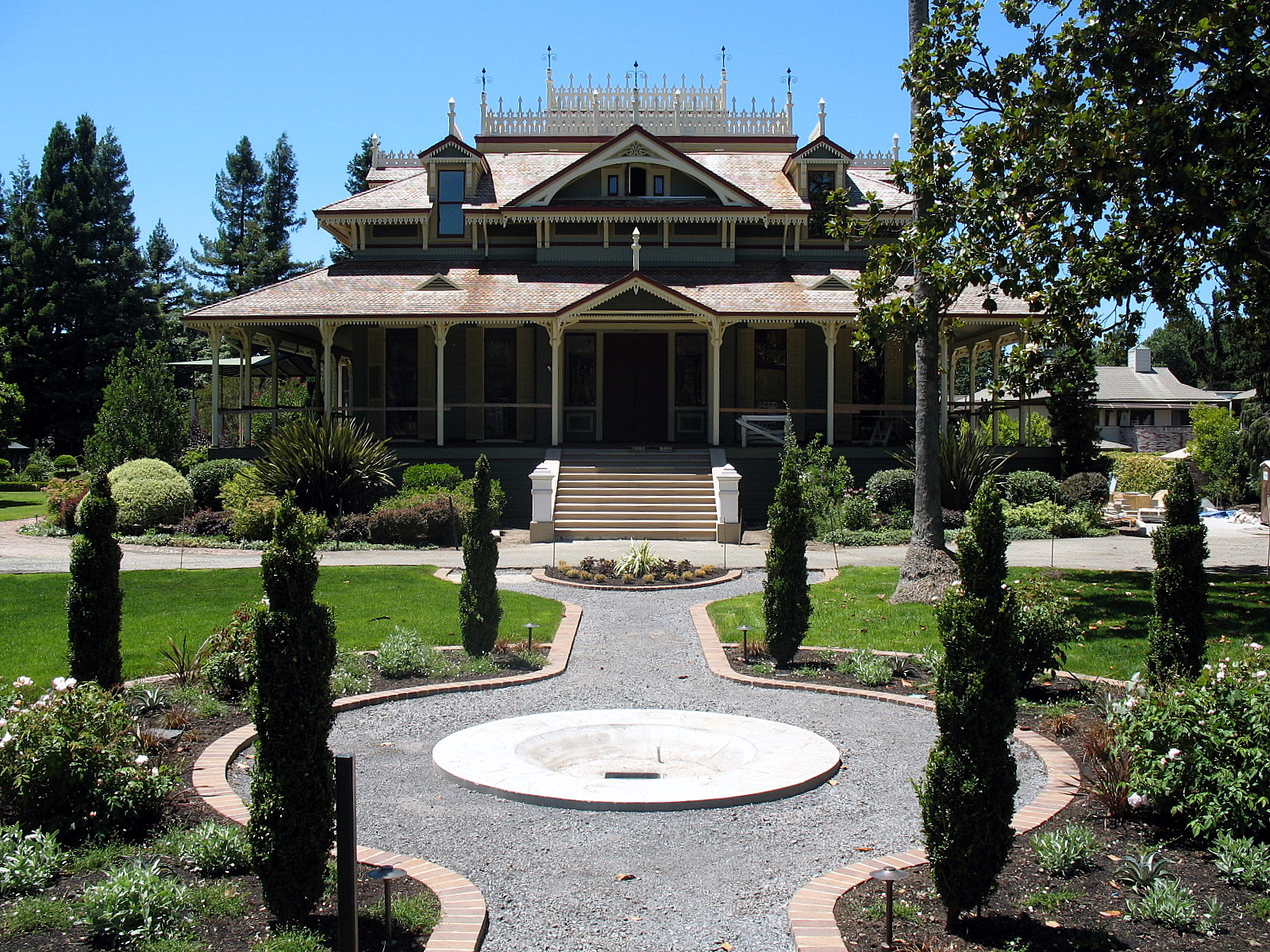
- Mableton, as it appeared in summer 2010.

- Location within California
- Location: 1015 McDonald Ave. Santa Rosa, California
- Coordinates: 38°27′1″N 122°42′15″W
- Built: 1877
- Architectural style: Stick/Eastlake
- NRHP reference No.: 74000560

Significant dates
- Polyanna filming: August 1–7, 1959
- Added to NRHP: March 1, 1974

The McDonald Mansion, also known as Mableton, is an historic residence in Santa Rosa, California. It was built in 1876 in the Victorian Stick/Eastlake style as a summer home for the McDonald family, whose primary residence was in San Francisco.

After the death of the senior McDonalds, the eldest son Mark Jr. and his wife Isabelle eventually became sole owners of Mableton, and made it their primary residence. By the early 1920s, the two began to extensively remodel Mableton to suit their own tastes.

In 1959, Mabelton's exterior was used in the filming of Walt Disney's Pollyanna. However, film editors altered the look of the McDonald house by using matte painting to add several stories to make the building taller, as well as architectural features.

In 1977, during a restoration process, a fire destroyed a large part of the house. The owner, Dr. Jack Leissring, rebuilt the house. He sold it in 2005 to technology entrepreneur John Webley and his wife Jennifer. As of 2018, they remain the owners of the house.

In 2006, the Rynerson O'Brien Architecture firm began a five-year renovation of the home. The overhaul included restoring the exterior, recreating Victorian theme rooms throughout the home, and adding new features to the backyard.
