= Ledson Marsh =

Marsh in Sonoma County, California, United States

Coordinates: 38.4085°N 122.5997°W

Ledson Marsh is a 30-acre (0.1 km^{2}) freshwater marsh in Annadel State Park east of Santa Rosa in Sonoma County, California, United States. Located on the east flank of Bennett Mountain, it drains into Schultz Creek, a tributary of Yulupa Creek.

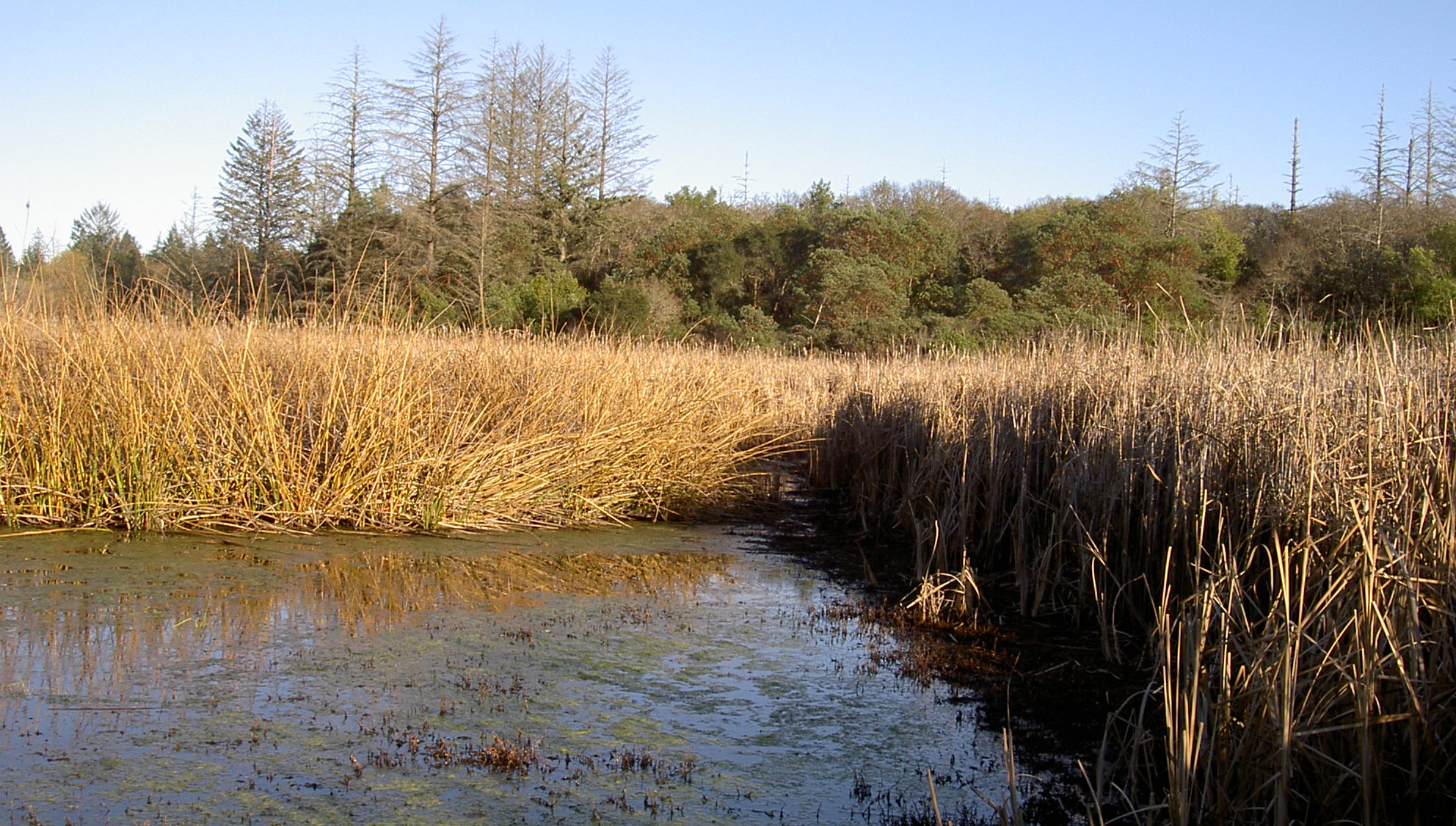
A remnant of Ledson Marsh near the end of the dry season

== Earthen dam ==
The marsh was formed by an earthen embankment dam about 300 feet (91 m) long, constructed in 1930 by a former landowner. The dam is about 6 feet (2 m) high and 4 feet (1.2 m) wide at its crest. Over the years, the dam deteriorated, allowing water to seep through it and causing the marsh to dry out in the autumn and refill during the winter rains. The deterioration was partly due to rodent holes and partly due to stumps left by the felling of eucalyptus trees that were planted on both sides of the embankment.

There was concern over the dam's safety. A catastrophic dam failure would destroy the marsh habitat and clog various Sonoma Creek tributaries with sediment. The California Department of Parks and Recreation therefore repaired the dam in such a way as to preserve the marsh's seasonality.

California red-legged frogs

Because of its seasonality, the marsh was colonized by California red-legged frogs (Rana draytonii), a federal- and state-listed threatened species. Government agencies grew concerned that if the marsh did not dry out every year, bullfrogs might establish themselves in the marsh, displacing the red-legged frogs.

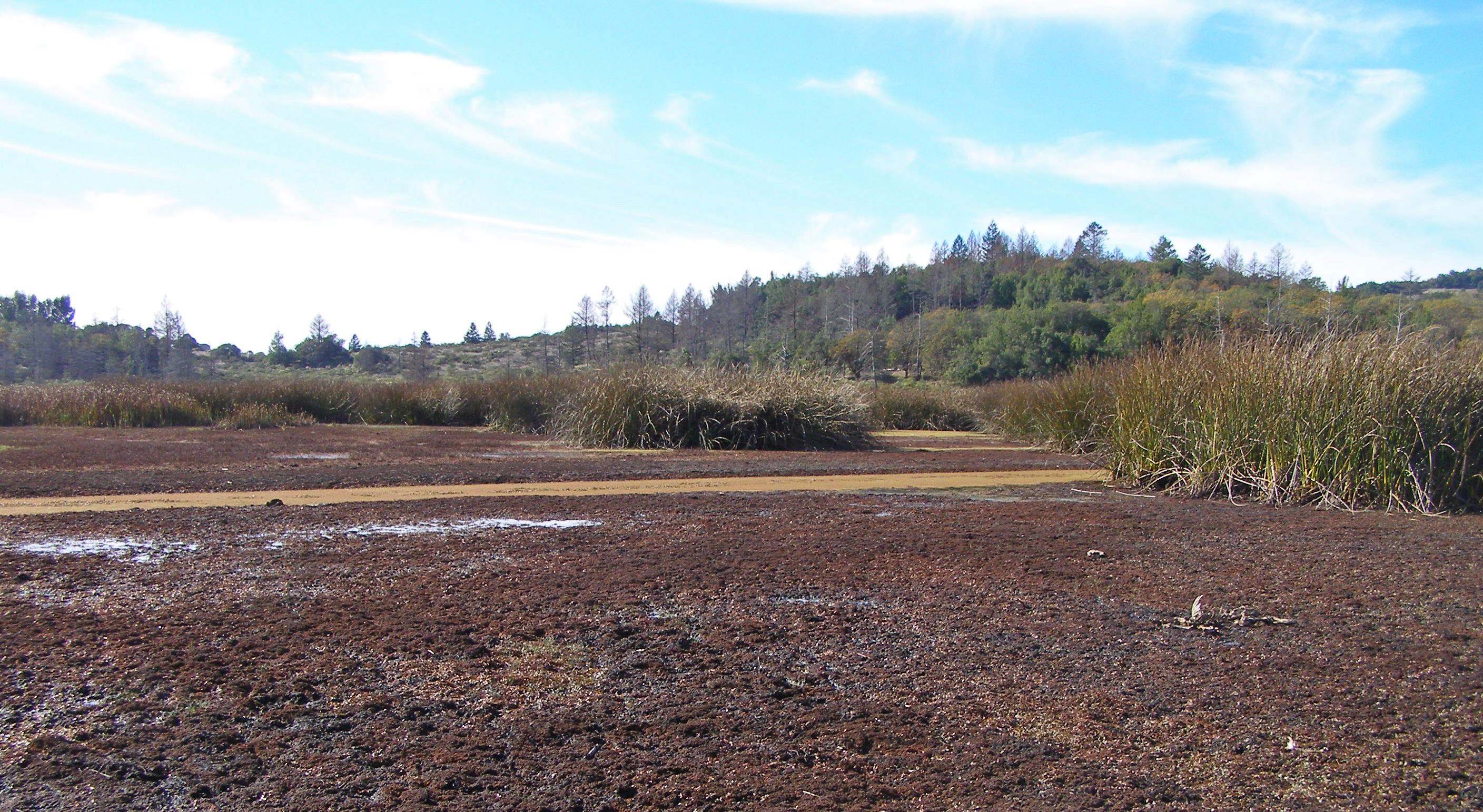
Ledson Marsh in 2006

== Recreation ==
The marsh is a picnicking and bird-watching spot, and also used for mountain bicyclists, hikers, joggers, and equestrians.

== See also ==
- Annadel State Park
- Lake Ilsanjo
