= Matanzas Creek =

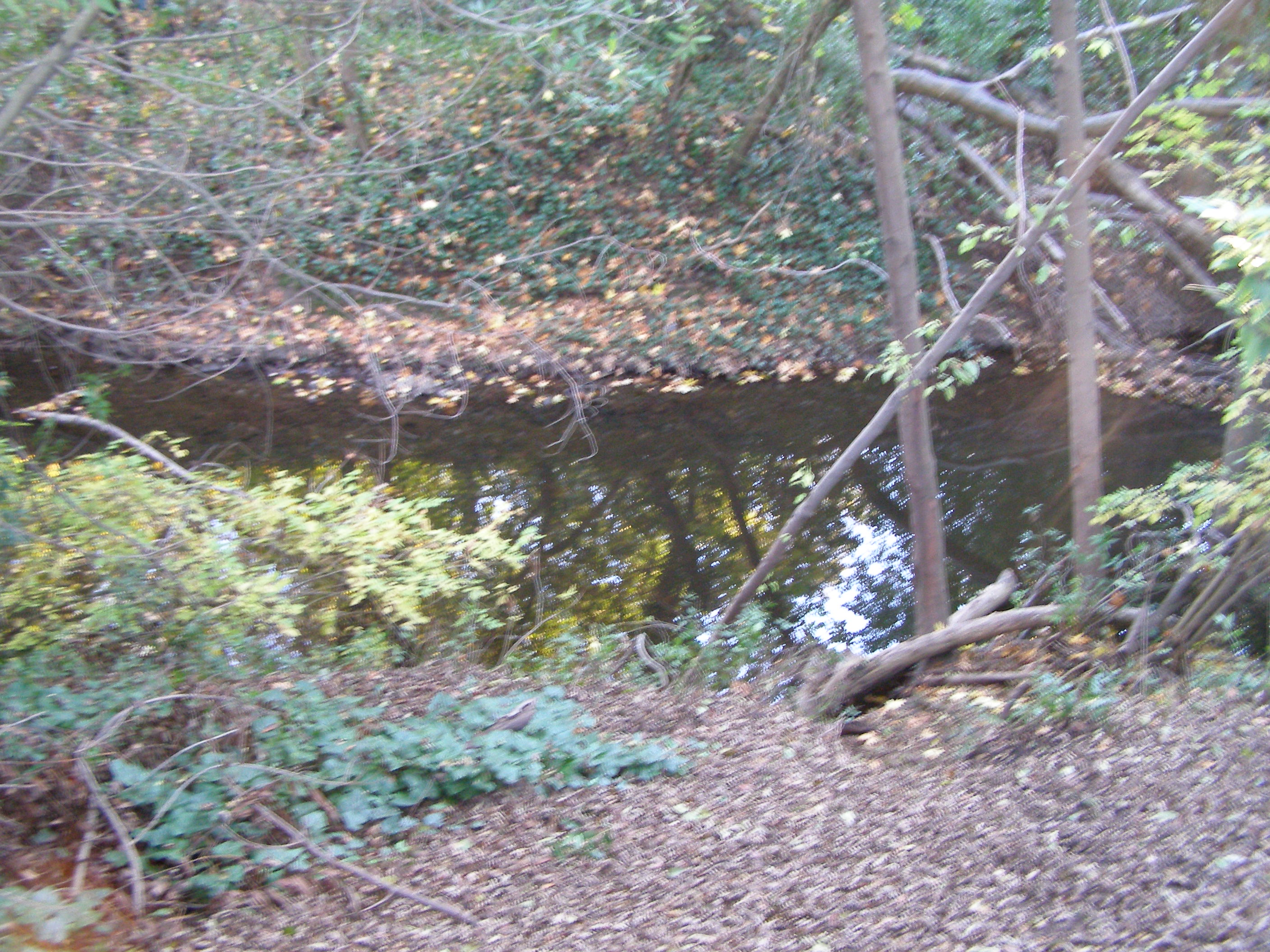
- Matanzas Creek at Doyle Community Park, Santa Rosa, California

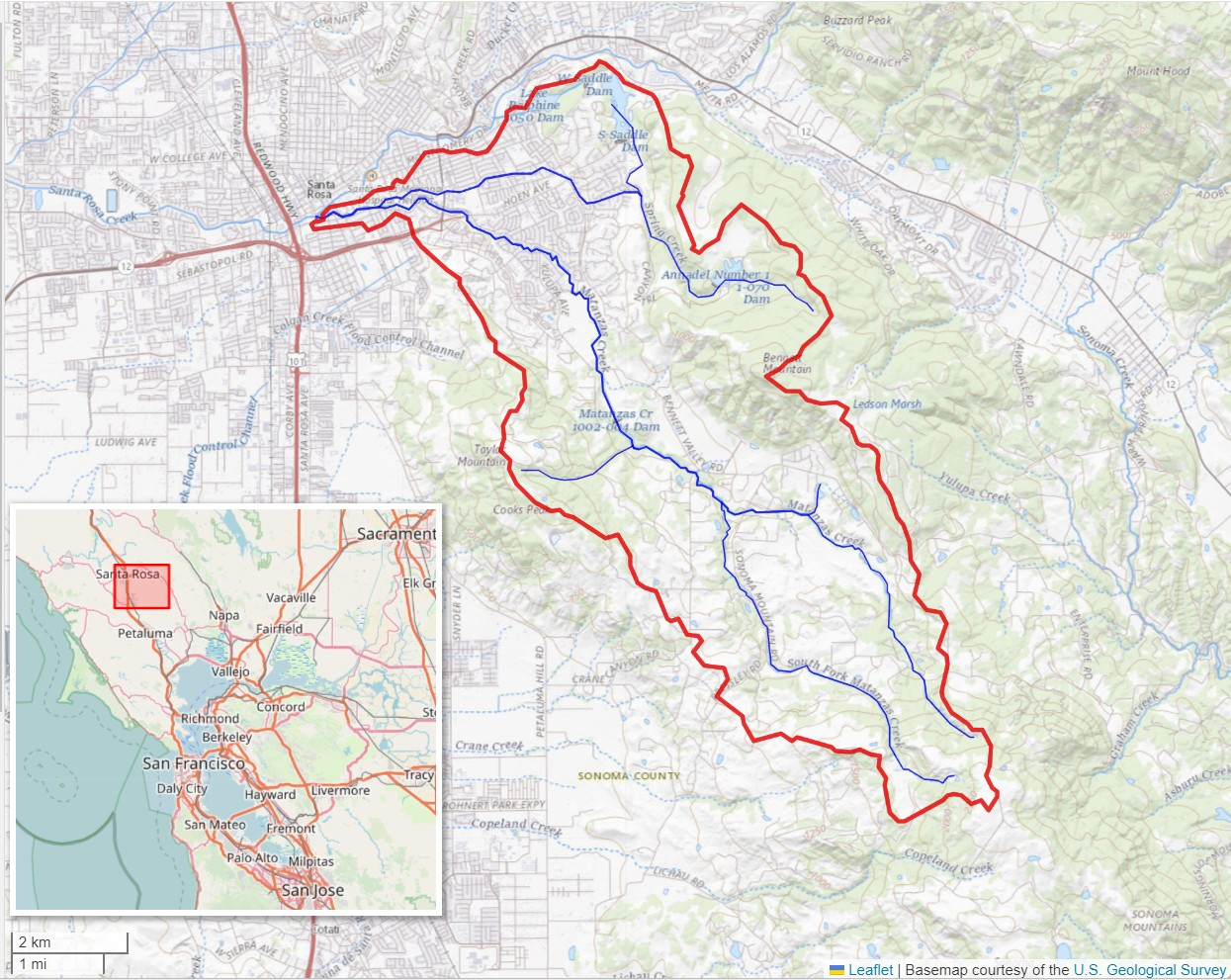
- Matanzas Creek watershed (Interactive map)
- Etymology: Spanish

Location
- Country: United States
- State: California
- Region: Sonoma County
- City: Santa Rosa, California

Physical characteristics
- Source: north slope of Sonoma Mountain
  - location: 3 mi (5 km) west of Glen Ellen, California
  - coordinates: 38°21′23″N 122°34′49″W
  - elevation: 1,980 ft (600 m)
- Mouth: Santa Rosa Creek
  - location: downtown Santa Rosa
  - coordinates: 38°26′15″N 122°42′45″W
  - elevation: 151 ft (46 m)

Basin features
- Tributaries
  - left: South Fork Matanzas Creek
  - right: Spring Creek

Matanzas Creek is an 11.4-mile-long (18.3 km) year-round stream in Sonoma County, California, United States, a tributary of Santa Rosa Creek.

== Course ==
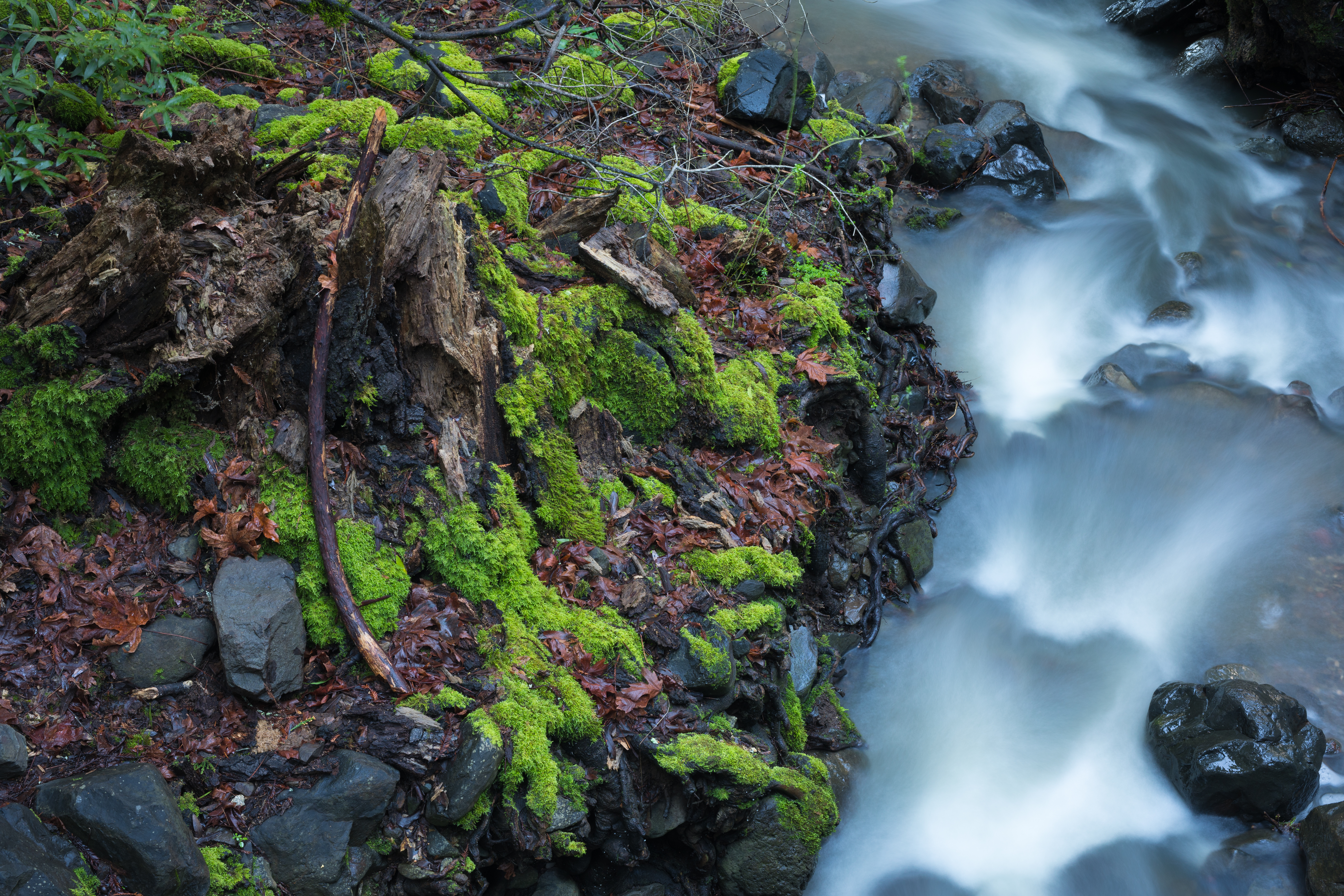
Headwater of Matanzas Creek at the North Sonoma Mountain Regional Park and Open Space Preserve

Matanzas Creek springs from the northern slope of Sonoma Mountain and flows northward into Bennett Valley to join the South Fork Matanzas Creek. The stream runs the length of Bennett Valley between Taylor Mountain and Bennett Mountain, flowing under Grange Road near Bennet Valley Road, through Matanzas Creek Reservoir and Bennett Valley Golf Course to the city of Santa Rosa. In Santa Rosa, the creek parallels Creekside Road, Cypress Road, and Hoen Avenue westward to Doyle Community Park, where it is joined by Spring Creek. From there, the creek continues westward to a confluence with Santa Rosa Creek just north of the Luther Burbank Home and Gardens.

The waters of Matanzas Creek reach the Pacific Ocean south of Jenner, California, by way of Santa Rosa Creek, the Laguna de Santa Rosa, Mark West Creek, and the Russian River.

== Ecology ==
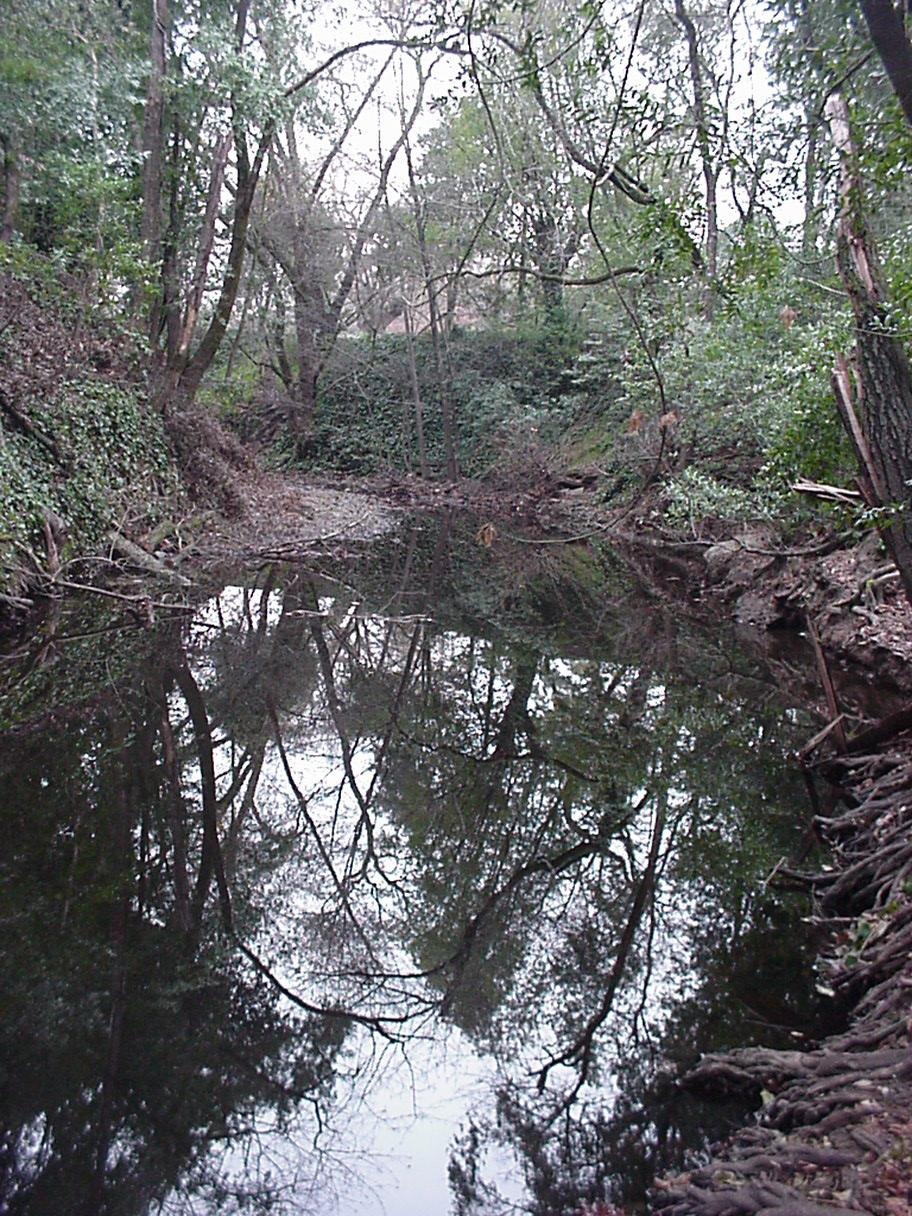
Steep stream banks of Quaternary alluvium are colonized by bay trees and non-native ivy adjacent to Doyle Park.

The upper reaches of Matanzas Creek have gradients of five to fifteen percent as the stream cascades down Sonoma Mountain. Matanzas Creek channel has been deepened 4 to 5 meters to minimize urban flooding where it flows through Quaternary alluvium of the Santa Rosa Plain for approximately 1 mile (2 kilometers) prior to confluence with Santa Rosa Creek.

In downtown Santa Rosa, the creek passes through a 1,400-foot-long (430 m) culvert designed to allow maximum development of the city; however, this structure has impeded the spawning of anadromous fish in the upper Matanzas Creek. A proposal was developed for retrofitting the structure with inflatable bladders that will allow fish to scale the fish ladder, while allowing pools to form, thus preventing low flow uniformly shallow depths.

== See also ==
- Brush Creek
- List of watercourses in the San Francisco Bay Area
- Pomo people
- Spawn (biology)
