= Taylor Mountain (Sonoma County, California) =

Mountain in California

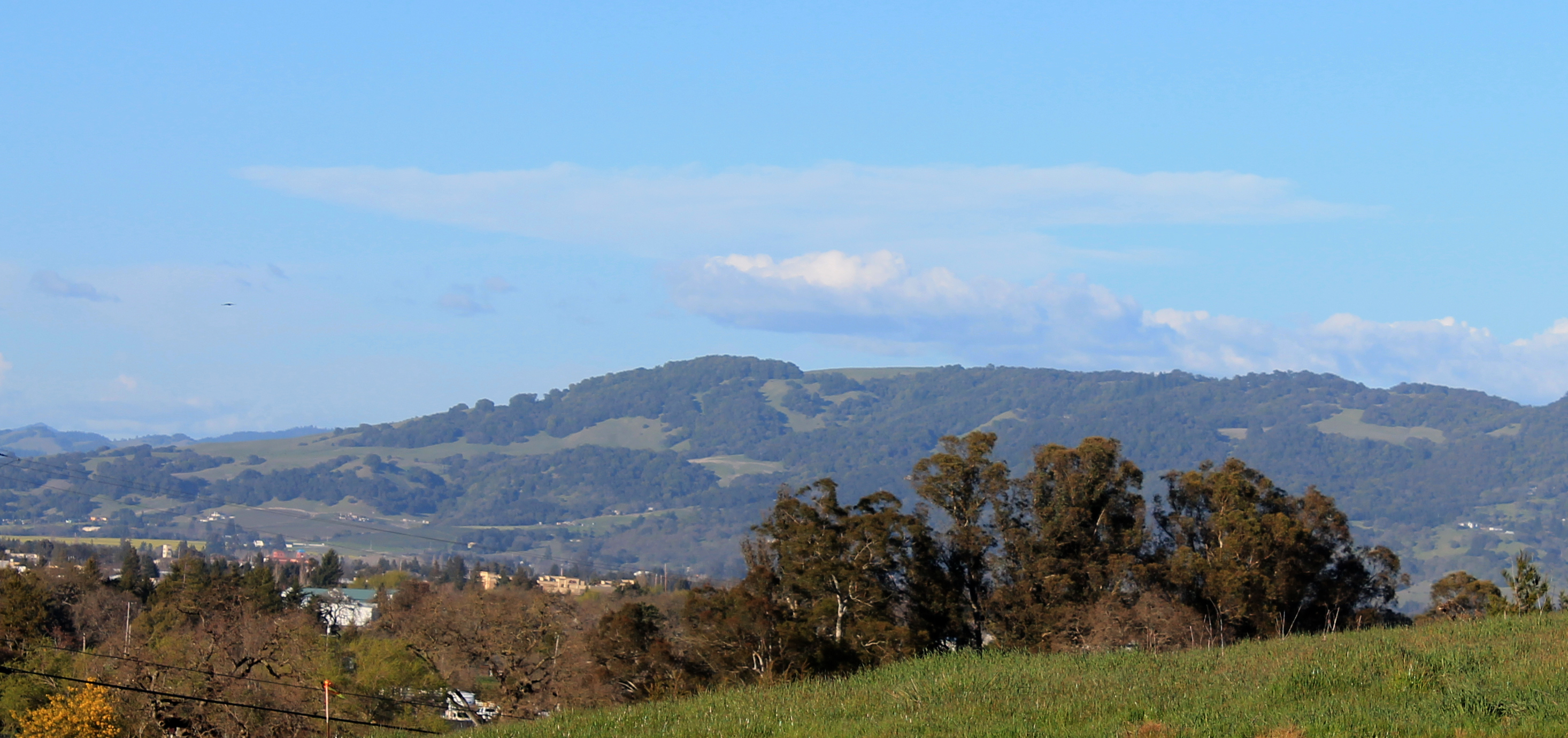
- Taylor Mountain, viewed from the southwest

Highest point
- Elevation: 1,406 ft (429 m) NAVD 88
- Coordinates: 38°24′02″N 122°40′29″W

Geography
- Location: Sonoma County, California, U.S.
- Parent range: Sonoma Mountains
- Topo map: USGS Santa Rosa

Climbing
- Easiest route: trail

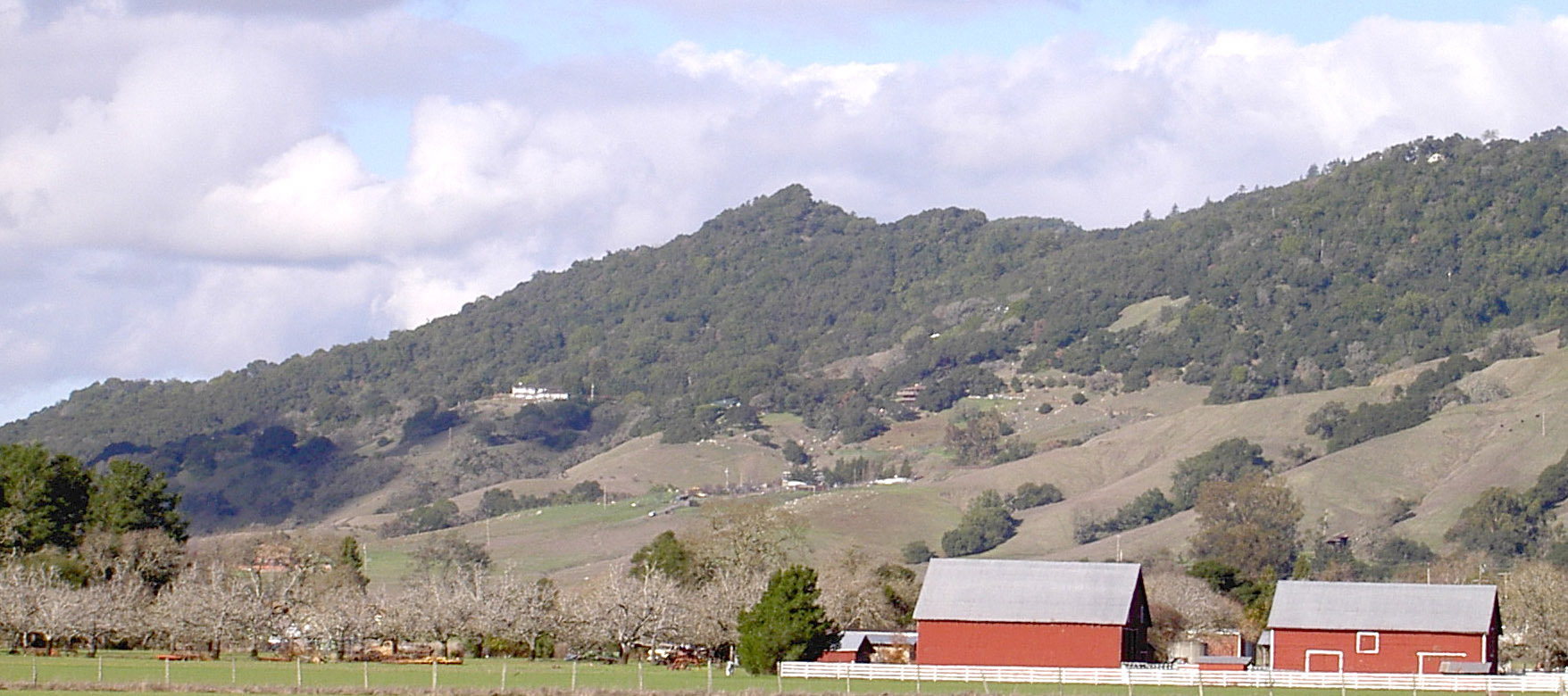
from the south

Taylor Mountain is a summit at the northern extreme of the Sonoma Mountains in California. The mountain lies in the Laguna de Santa Rosa drainage basin; its east flank drains to Matanzas Creek, a northwestward flowing stream running the length of Bennett Valley, and its west flank drains to Five Creek. The mountain is named after California Gold Rush pioneer John Shackleford Taylor, who settled on the mountain slopes in 1853 to raise dairy cows and plant a vineyard.

North of Taylor Mountain, Taylor Ridge descends toward the city of Santa Rosa. Some of Santa Rosa's urban expansion is taking place to the east of this ridge.

Taylor Mountain is readily visible from Sonoma Mountain, Bennett Valley, the Santa Rosa Plain and from as far north as the Alexander Valley.

The peak of Taylor Mountain defines (in part) the boundary between the Sonoma Coast AVA and the Sonoma Valley AVA, two federally designated grape-growing regions. Wines made from grapes grown on its western slopes would qualify for the Sonoma Coast appellation, whereas those made from grapes grown on its eastern slopes would qualify for the Sonoma Valley appellation.

== Taylor Mountain Regional Park ==
The Taylor Mountain Open Space Preserve encompasses over 1,100 acres (450 ha) of Taylor Mountain. The land was purchased for public use between 1995 and 2011 by the Sonoma County Agricultural Preservation and Open Space District. A Landpaths permit program allowed public access in 2010. The park was opened to the general public on February 23, 2013, with four miles of dirt trails for hikers. A second entrance and trailhead opened along Petaluma Hill Road, south of Yolanda Avenue, on June 13, 2015. The new entrance includes amenities such as picnic tables and parking for horse trailers. From this entrance, you can take a 1.2-mile (1.9 km) trail which connects to the other side of the park. Licensed dogs are allowed on leashes no longer than 6 feet. The flanks of the 1,400 feet (430 m) peak provide panoramic views of the Santa Rosa Plains to the west with Bennett Valley and Annadel State Park to the north. Trail access is from a parking lot near the eastern end of Kawana Terrace off Kawana Springs Road east of Santa Rosa Avenue and Petaluma Hill Road. There is a $7 fee per vehicle for day use. The park is open from 8 AM to sunset.

== See also ==
- List of summits of the San Francisco Bay Area
- Miwok
- Spring Creek
- Yulupa Creek
