= Doyle Community Park =

Park in Santa Rosa, California, United States

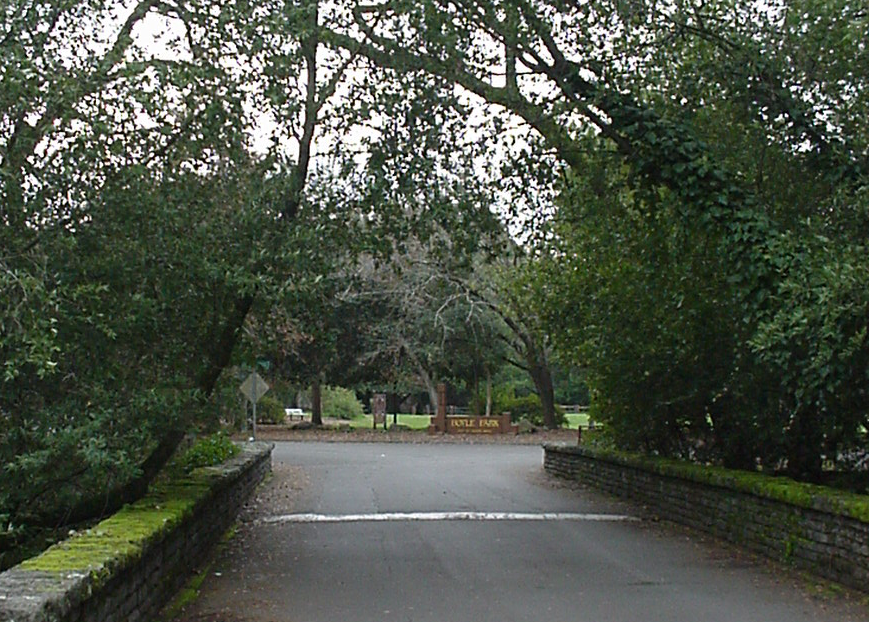
- The main entrance to Doyle Park is this bridge over Spring Creek built by the Work Projects Administration at the southern end of Doyle Park Drive.
- Interactive map of Doyle Community Park
- Type: urban park
- Location: Santa Rosa, California
- Coordinates: 38°26′24″N 122°41′49″W
- Area: 21.76 acres (8.81 ha)
- Operator: City of Santa Rosa

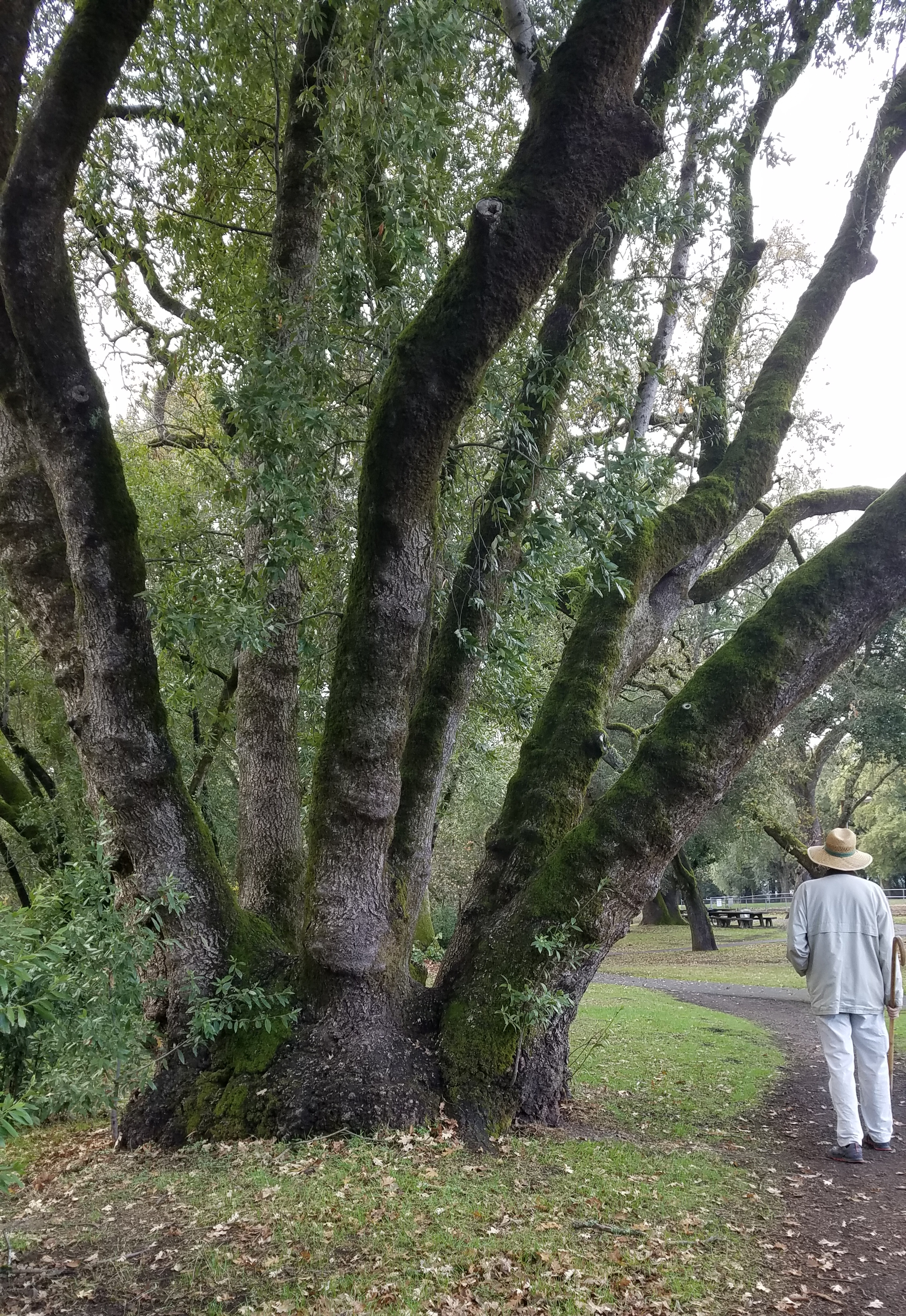
This single Umbellularia lignotuber adjacent to Matanzas Creek supports multiple mature sprouts.

Doyle Community Park is an urban park on the eastern edge of downtown Santa Rosa, California. The western end of the park is the confluence of Matanzas Creek and Spring Creek. Spring Creek forms the northern park boundary and Matanzas Creek forms the southern park boundary. The eastern end of the park is a fenced and lighted baseball field formerly used by the minor league Santa Rosa Pirates. The remainder of the park includes the Doyle Park Clubhouse, restrooms, playground slides and swings, horseshoe pits, separate fenced areas for unleashed large and small dogs, and picnic tables with barbecue grills including five sites available for reservation.

A paved trail follows the shaded riparian woodland of mature oaks, maples, and California bay laurel trees along Spring Creek and Matanzas Creek from the Doyle Park Clubhouse on Hoen Avenue to the footbridge over Matanzas Creek across Vallejo Street from Brook Hill School. Prior to European settlement, what is now Doyle Park was part of a larger riparian wetland within which these creeks changed course when dead trees fell into their channels and accumulated coarse woody debris diverted flood runoff out of those channels to form new channels. Europeans deepened the present creek channels about 4 m (13 ft) through Quaternary alluvium of the Santa Rosa Plain to minimize urban flooding. The park and paved trail is at the level of the original wetland, but there are a few access points into the lower channels which now confine the creeks.

Western gray squirrels are plentiful in the park, and a murder of crows often gather nearby. Birdwatchers have observed sparrows, finches, towhees, jays, woodpeckers, robins, bluebirds, mockingbirds, chickadees, phoebes, kinglets, warblers, nuthatches, and titmice.

== Frank Pierce Doyle ==
Frank Pierce Doyle (1863–1948) and his father Manville Doyle formed the Exchange Bank of Santa Rosa in 1890. Frank purchased the land for Doyle Community Park as a memorial for his 13-year-old son who died during tonsillectomy surgery in 1921. Frank encouraged improvement of local transportation, including building the Golden Gate Bridge. While touring the bridge construction site two months before the opening, Frank rode in the first private automobile across the bridge, and was designated "Father of the Golden Gate." When Frank died, 50.4% of the Exchange Bank common stock was put into a perpetual trust as the Frank P. Doyle and Polly O’Meara Doyle Scholarship Fund. Since 1948, this scholarship fund has provided over $90 million to more than 135,000 Sonoma County students attending Santa Rosa Junior College. The fund also provides $2,000 annually for maintenance of Doyle Community Park.
