= McDonald family of California =

Wealthy family of California

The McDonalds were a wealthy family of California during the 19th and 20th centuries. Descended from Mark Lindsay McDonald (1833–1917), they built and owned the historic residence "Mableton", also known as the "McDonald Mansion", in Santa Rosa.

Colonel Mark L. McDonald was born in Kentucky but settled in California during the 1850s. He made his money in road construction, and later in property development in Santa Rosa. He was married to Ralphine North McDonald (1843–1918), from Mississippi, and among their seven children it was Mark McDonald Jr. (died 1932) who became heir to Mableton. Mark Jr. was also a successful businessman, running a water works and a fruit packing plant. He and his wife Isabelle, née Juilliard (died 1960), made alterations to Mableton during the 1920s. They had three children, including their son Juilliard who died childless in 1946, and his sister Marcia later became the last McDonald heir. Upon Marcia's death in 1971, Mableton passed to the Stanford University and the University of California.

== Early history ==
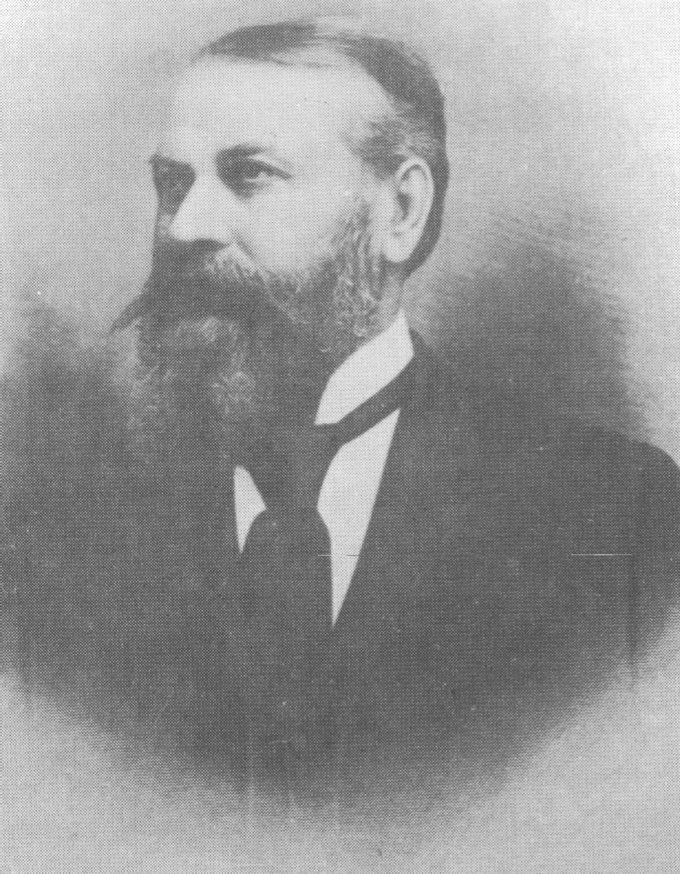
Colonel Mark Lindsey McDonald

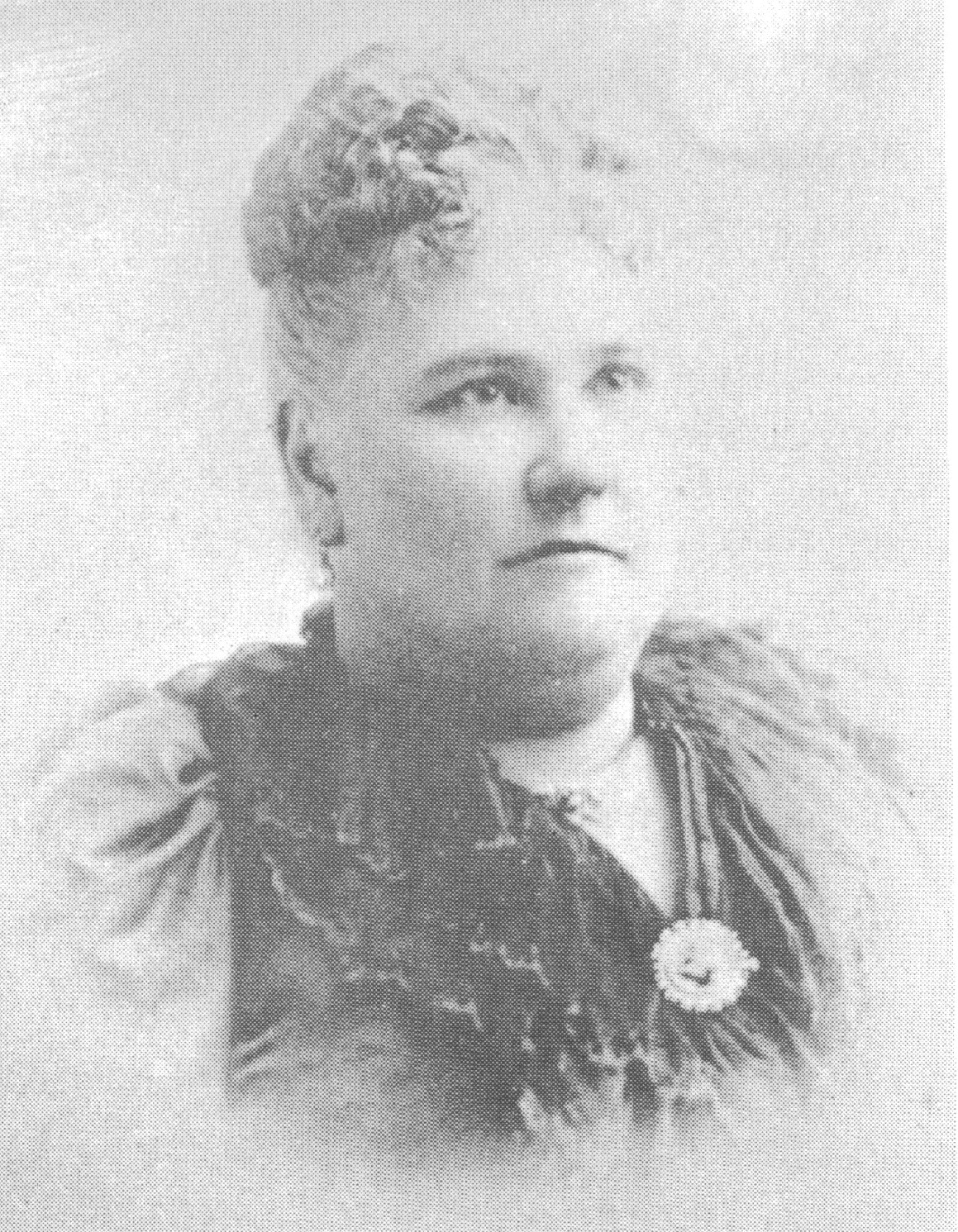
Ralphine North McDonald (b. 1843-d.1918)

Colonel Mark L. McDonald Sr., a Kentucky native, came west as captain of a wagon train in the early 1850s. Trained in engineering, he first built roadways servicing gold and silver mines. His early successes allowed him to buy a seat on the San Francisco Stock Exchange, during which time he joined the ranks of the rich and powerful, including George Hearst, Leland Stanford and Charles Crocker.

By the late 1860s, McDonald had begun to apply his wealth, influence and entrepreneurial spirit to new business opportunities in Santa Rosa. These included purchase and subdivision of 160 acres (0.65 km^{2}) of land in what was known as McDonald's Addition. During the 1870s, the new development flourished and McDonald Avenue became the premier residential street of Santa Rosa. The neighborhood's popularity was enhanced by a range of amenities including gas and water service, a new streetcar line established by Colonel McDonald, and an extensive tree planting program implemented with the assistance of famed local horticulturist Luther Burbank.

McDonald was active in civic affairs and was instrumental in the development of numerous local improvements, including Santa Rosa's first library, the first steam railroad brought to Santa Rosa and operation of the Santa Rosa Water Works Company, an early private utility. He capitalized and built the nearby reservoir known as Lake Ralphine, which was named for McDonald's wife. His other business interests included fruit packing plants and drying yards in the area.

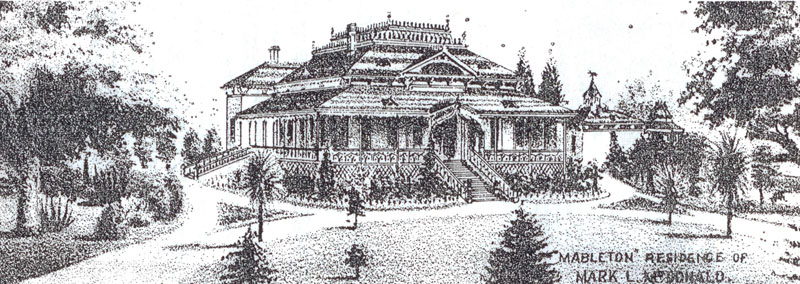
"Mableton", circa 1882. This is the earliest known view of the house, taken from a lithograph published in the 1880s. It was built in 1879 as the summer home of the Mark L. McDonald family, whose primary residence was in San Francisco. The family chose the name "Mableton" after the Mississippi plantation home of Ralphine North McDonald. Note the original two-tiered roof cresting and the bands of patterned roof shingles (now missing), which are to be restored. Partly visible on the far right of the image are the carriage house and the gazebo. Courtesy of Sonoma County Library History Annex and Santa Rosa Press Democrat.

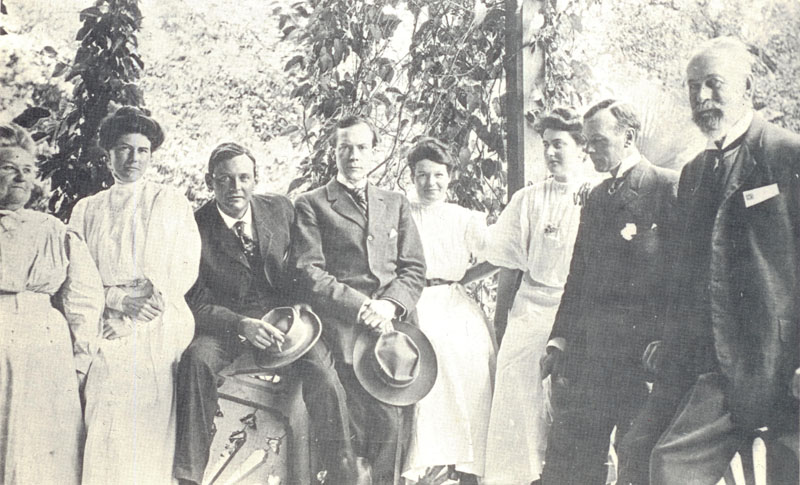
Colonel Mark L. McDonald family at Mableton, around 1900. Mrs. McDonald, Edith, Stewart, Maxwell McNutt, Mabel, Florence, Mark Jr. and the Colonel.

The McDonalds’ primary residence was in San Francisco and Mableton, later known and listed on the National Register of Historic Places as the McDonald Mansion, was built as their summer home. The couple had seven children, although two of their daughters (Ralphine and Alice) died during childhood. Those surviving into adulthood included Mark L. McDonald Jr., Stewart, Mabel, Edith and Florence.

Mark McDonald Jr. married Isabelle Juilliard, and it was they who would eventually own Mableton. Stewart McDonald died of tuberculosis in 1907. Mabel was an accomplished horsewoman who married William H. Hamilton of San Francisco. Edith married wealthy Selah Chamberlain, a socially prominent San Franciscan. Florence was also an excellent horsewoman who married Maxwell McNutt, of San Francisco.

Mark L. McDonald Sr. died in 1917 in San Francisco at the age of 84. Following his death, his wife Ralphine resided at Mableton, where she died in 1918 at the age of 75. The couple is buried at the north end of McDonald Avenue.

== The middle years ==
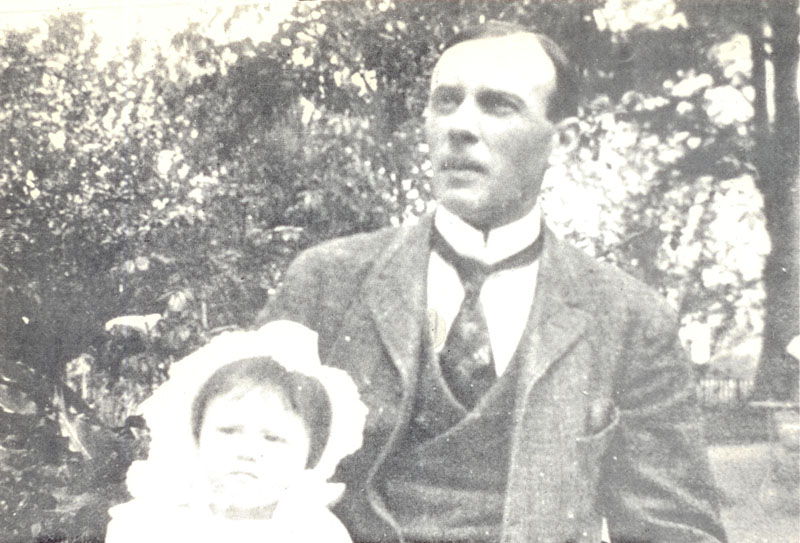
Mark McDonald, Jr. with young Marcia

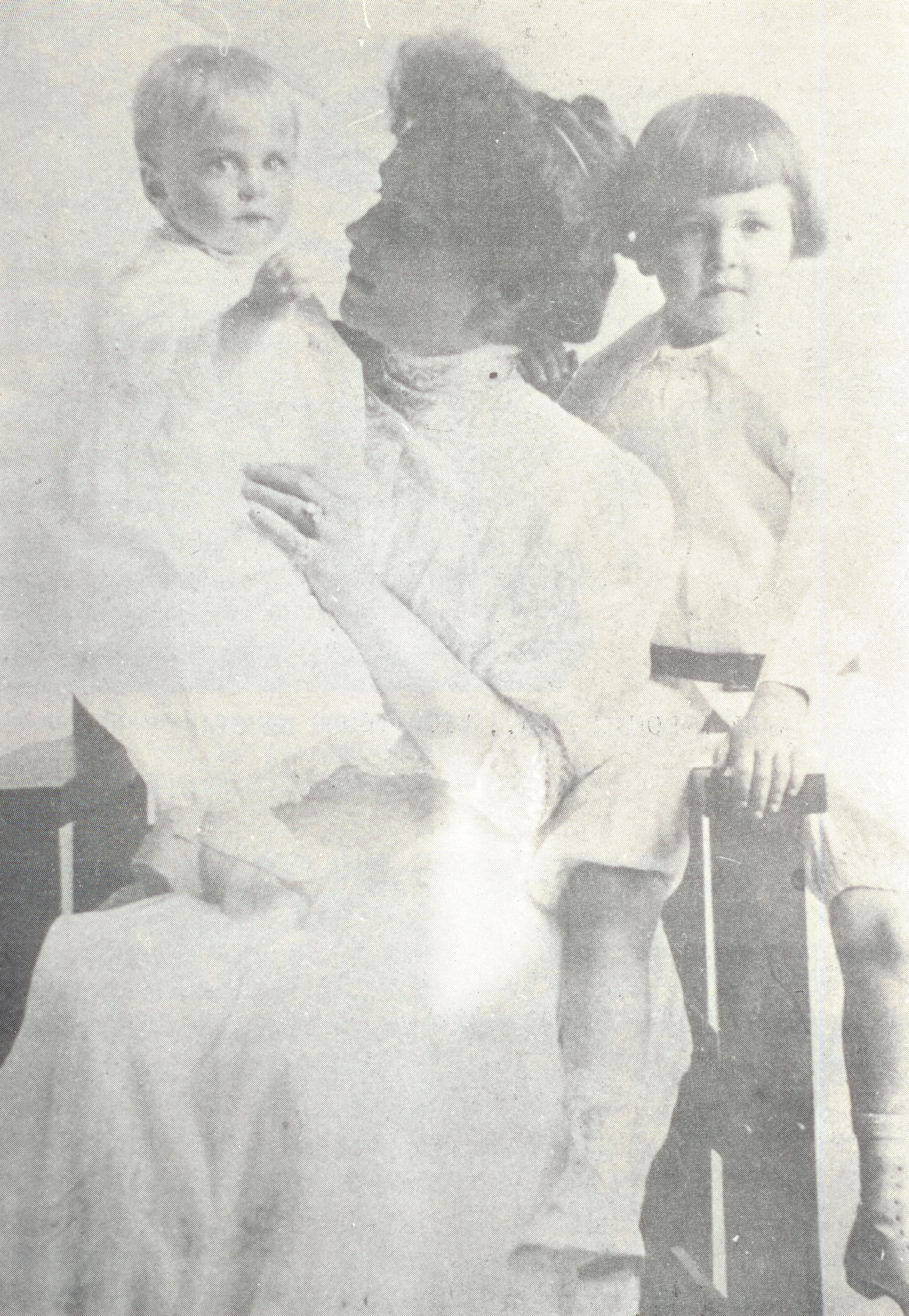
Mrs. Mark L. McDonald, Jr. (Isabelle Juilliard) with Juilliard and Marcia

After the death of the senior McDonalds, the eldest son Mark Jr. and his wife Isabelle eventually became sole owners of Mableton, and made it their primary residence. In his career, Mark Jr. followed the example of his father, and found success running the Santa Rosa Water Works, and the M. L. McDonald Jr. and Co. Fruit Packing plant. He also had extensive holdings in orchard land and other real estate.

Like her husband, Isabelle was a native Californian with family roots dating back to the Gold Rush. Her parents, Mr. and Mrs. Charles Frederick Juilliard, settled in Santa Rosa. The site of their family home was donated to the city by Isabelle's father, and survives today as Juilliard Park in downtown Santa Rosa. Isabelle's privileged upbringing included private East Coast schooling and several years of residence in Tuxedo Park, New York with her wealthy uncle Augustus D. Juilliard, who was the founder of the Juilliard School of Music.

By the early 1920s, Mark and Isabelle had begun to extensively remodel Mableton to suit their own tastes. Among the changes they implemented were alterations to the rear of the house, installation of additional bathrooms, and numerous landscape improvements, including a tennis court (now the site of a formal garden). The couple had two children who survived into adulthood: a son, Juilliard, and a daughter, Marcia (a third child, Mark McDonald III, died in infancy).

== The last McDonalds ==
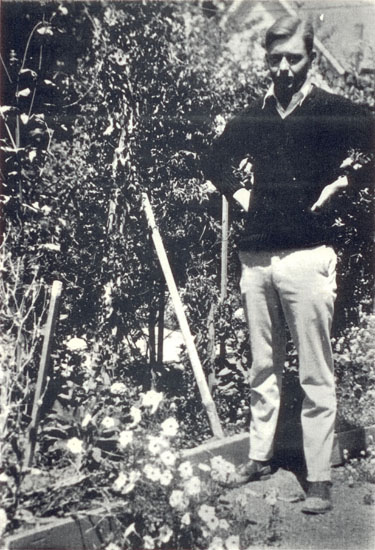
Juilliard McDonald, at 10th Street Home (was across from Saturday Aft. club)

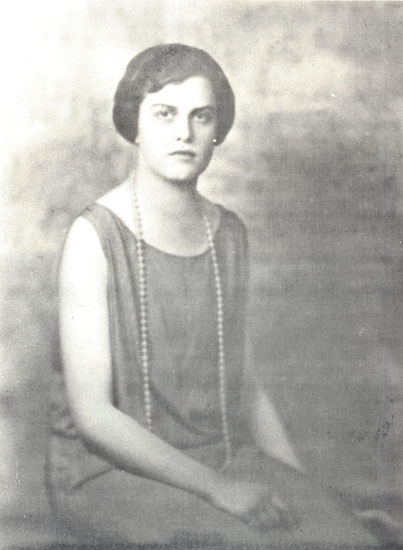
Marcia Augusta McDonald, around age 18

After Mark L. McDonald Jr. died in 1932, Isabelle occupied a Nob Hill apartment in San Francisco as her primary residence. Until her death in 1960, Mableton was once again used mostly as a summer home. Isabelle's son, Juilliard McDonald, had a successful career and maintained the family's business interests. Although he was married twice, Juilliard died childless in 1946. Following the death of Isabelle, her daughter Marcia became the last surviving McDonald heir. Like her mother, Marcia chose to make her primary home in a San Francisco apartment. However, she was less inclined to visit Mableton, and allowed the property to fall into disrepair.

When Marcia died in 1971 at the age of 65, the fate of the mansion was uncertain. The terms of Isabelle's will and trust had dictated that, upon Marcia's death, Mableton was to be left jointly to the University of California and Stanford University. Eventually, the property was offered for sale to the City of Santa Rosa, and local controversy over possible development plans for the site ensued. After an environmental impact report suggested that single family ownership was necessary, Jack Leissring bought the property in 1974 and sold the house in 2005, retaining the carriage house as his property.
