= Bennett Mountain =

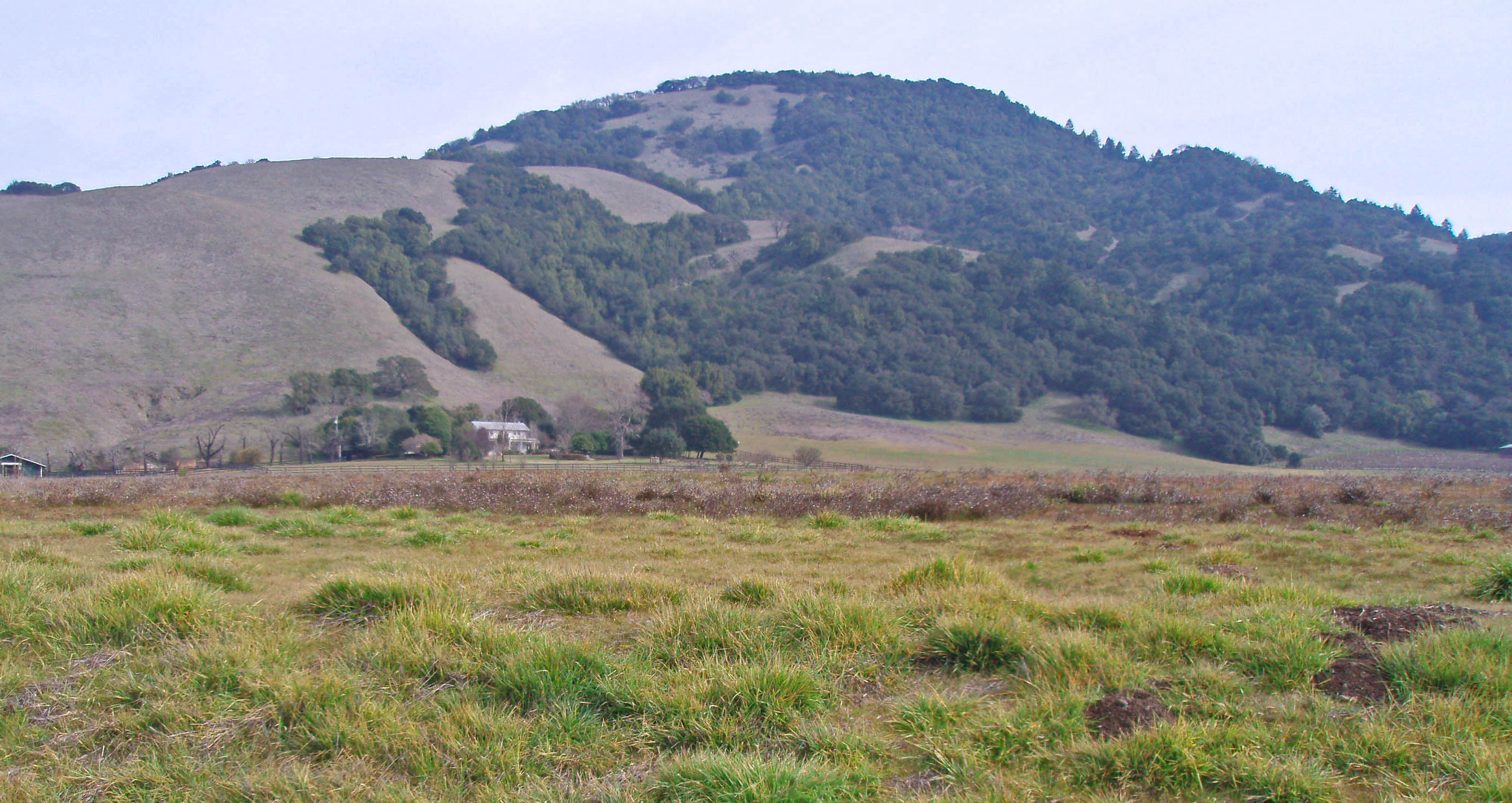
- Bennett Mountain, viewed from Bennett Valley

Highest point
- Elevation: 1,909 ft (582 m) NAVD 88
- Coordinates: 38°24′48″N 122°37′30″W

Geography
- Location within California
- Location: Sonoma County, California, U.S.
- Parent range: Sonoma Mountains
- Topo map: USGS Kenwood

Climbing
- Easiest route: Unpaved road

Bennett Mountain, also commonly known as Bennett Peak, is a 1,909-foot (582 m) summit in the Sonoma Mountains of California. Located on the west edge of Annadel State Park, it separates Bennett Valley in the Russian River drainage basin from Sonoma Valley in the Sonoma Creek drainage basin.

Bennett Valley was named for James N. Bennett, an emigrant from Illinois who settled in the area in the 19th century.

The mountain was burned following the October 2017 Northern California wildfires.

== Viticulture ==
Grapes were planted on Bennett Mountain as early as 1862, when Isaac DeTurk planted 30 acres (12 ha) at the base of its western slope. By 1878 he was producing 100,000 US gallons (380,000 L) of wine from his own and purchased grapes at a winery on Grange and Bennett Valley roads. Since 2003, the summit has formed the eastern edge of the Bennett Valley AVA.

== See also ==
- Ledson Marsh
- List of summits of the San Francisco Bay Area
- Sonoma Mountain
- Taylor Mountain (Sonoma County, California)
