= Lake Ralphine =

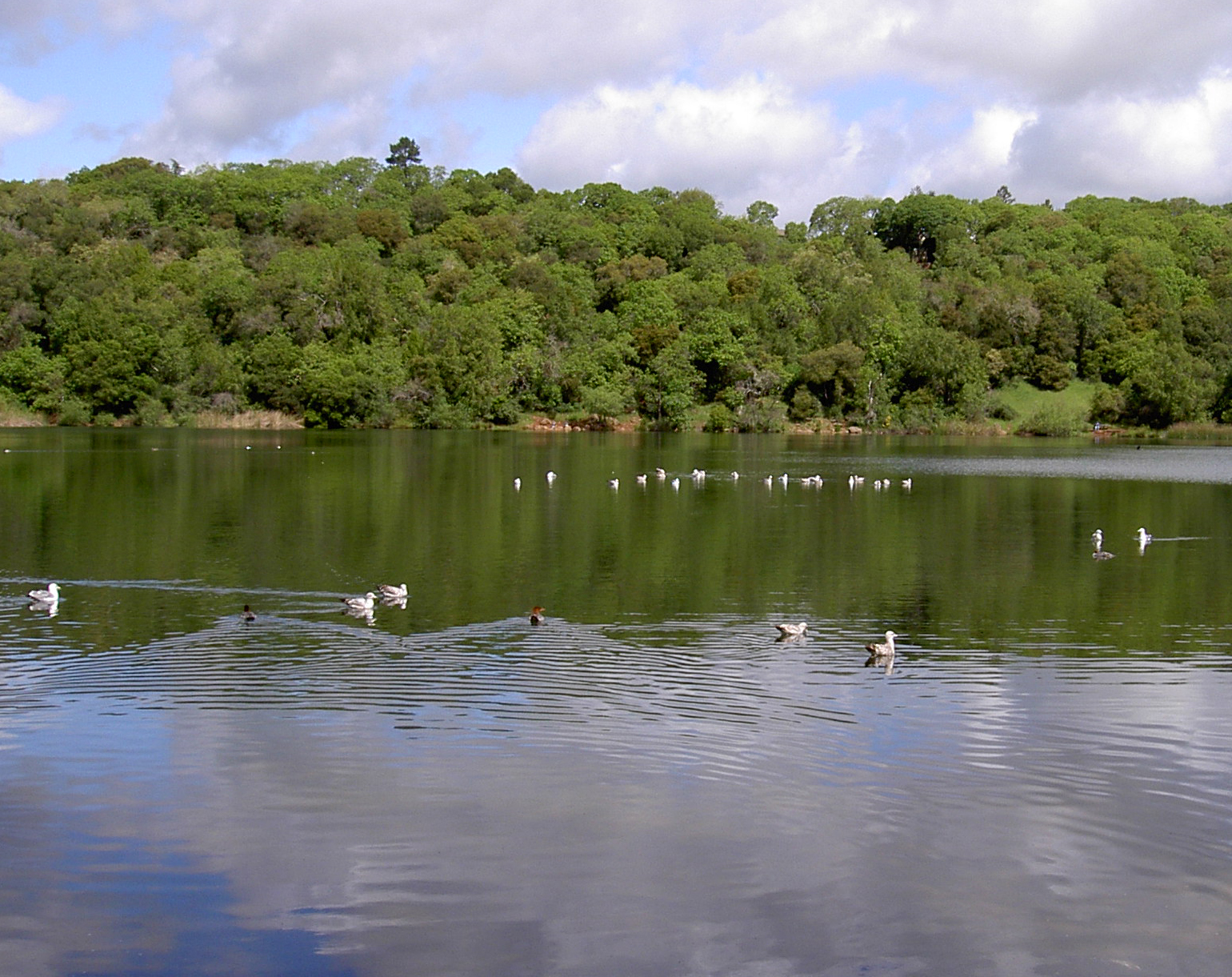
- waterfowl on Lake Ralphine, 2010

- Location within California Location within the United States
- Location: Sonoma County, California
- Coordinates: 38°27′18″N 122°40′01″W
- Type: reservoir
- Primary outflows: a tributary of Santa Rosa Creek
- Catchment area: 0.15 sq mi (0.39 km^{2})
- Basin countries: United States
- Surface area: 19 acres (7.7 ha)
- Water volume: 387 acre⋅ft (477,000 m^{3})
- Surface elevation: 256 ft (78 m)
- Settlements: Santa Rosa

Lake Ralphine is a reservoir in Howarth Memorial Park in the city of Santa Rosa, in the U.S. state of California.

== Fishing ==
The California Department of Fish and Wildlife stocks the lake annually with trout of catchable size. Other fishes found in the lake include bass, bluegill, and catfish.

== History ==
The lake is formed by an earthen dam which dates back to 1882. It was built by Colonel Mark Lindsay McDonald and named after his wife. In 1947 it was purchased by the City of Santa Rosa.

== Access ==
The lake is encircled by trails (Eagle Scout Trail and Old Fisherman's Trail) which connect to the Howarth Park parking lot off of Summerfield Road. Horses and motorized vehicles are not allowed on these trails.

In season, kayaks, paddle boats, canoes, rowboats, and sailboats are available for rent, and there is a launch ramp for private boats.

== See also ==
- List of lakes in California
- List of lakes in the San Francisco Bay Area
- List of reservoirs and dams in California
- Santa Rosa Creek Reservoir
