= Spring Lake Regional Park =

Public park in Santa Rosa, California

Spring Lake Regional Park is a 320-acre (130 ha) public park in southeastern Santa Rosa, Sonoma County, California, United States. Centered on the Santa Rosa Creek Reservoir, the park is administered by the Sonoma County Regional Parks Department. Its coordinates are 38.45°N 122.65°W, and its official address is 391 Violetti Drive.

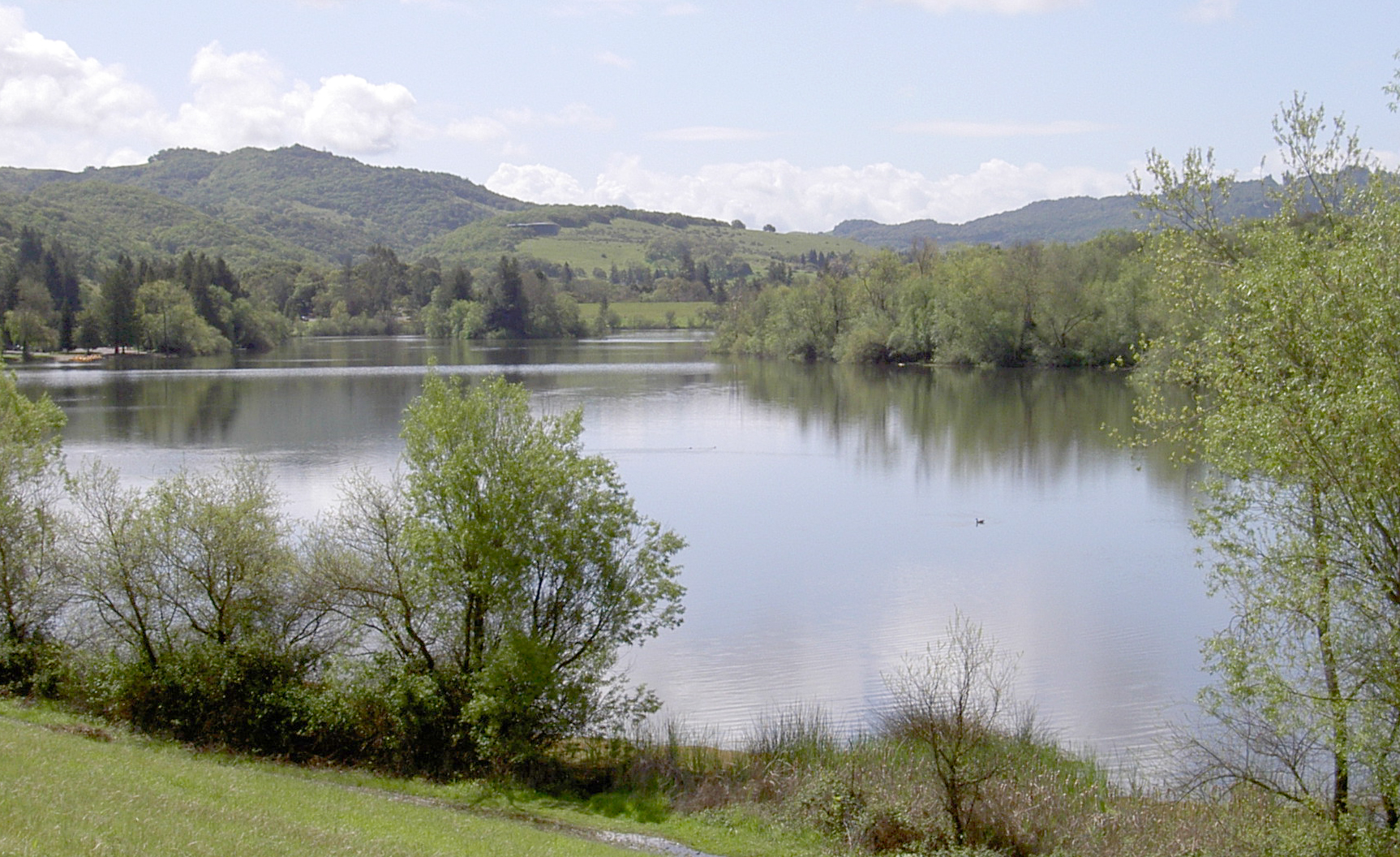
The reservoir, viewed from the north.

== General information ==
=== Hours ===
The park is open daily from 7am to sunset.

=== Parking ===
Parking costs $8 per vehicle in fall, winter, and spring, and $10 per vehicle in the summer. Parking for vehicles with 9 or more passengers costs $1.00 per person.

=== Dogs ===
Dogs are permitted on leash no longer than 6 feet (2 m) in length. Rabies certificates are required. Dogs are not allowed around the swimming lagoon area including the swimming lagoon itself or the beach. Dogs are allowed on the grass, on the paths, and in Spring Lake.

== Camping ==
Spring Lake offers individual and group camping. The campground is open seven days a week from May 1 through September 30. During the rest of the year, it is only open on weekends and holidays.

== Swimming ==
In addition to the 154-acre (0.62 km^{2}) reservoir (where people can boat and fish) there is 3-acre (12,000 m^{2}) swimming lagoon with sandy beach and concession stand. The swimming lagoon is staffed by lifeguards and is open from Memorial Day weekend through Labor Day.

== Boating ==
The lake is open year-round to windsurf, canoe or paddle boat. No gas-powered boats are allowed on the lake, but electric motors are allowed. Lifejackets or personal flotation devices (PFD) are required by all boaters regardless of age or swimming ability. This is due to a county ordinance.

== Picnics ==
There are 200 picnic tables with barbecues located throughout the park, plus four group picnic areas which may be reserved.

== Trails ==
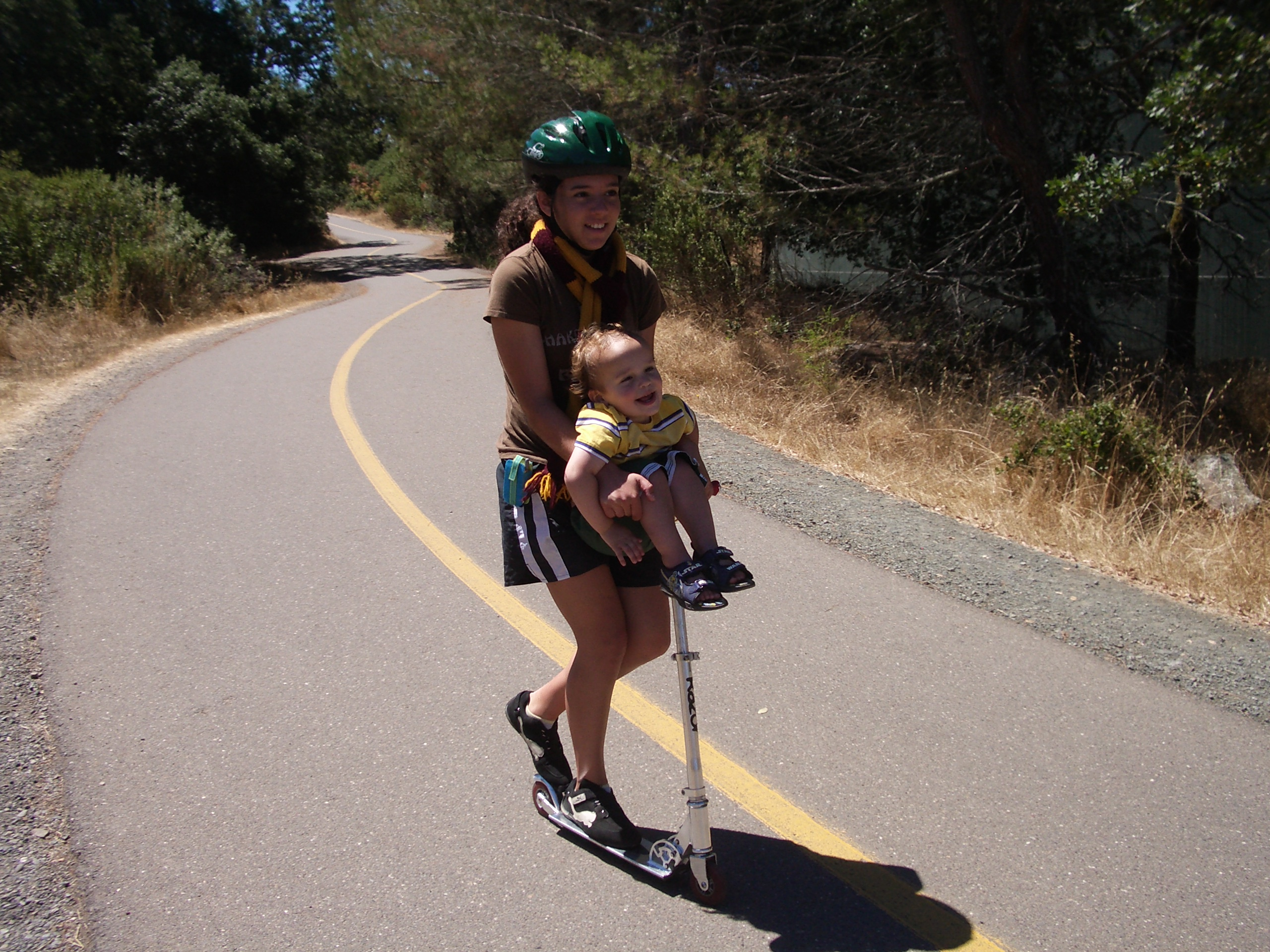
The trails circling the reservoir attract hikers, bikers, and equestrians.

Spring Lake is used by hikers, joggers and strollers. Trails connect to neighboring Howarth Park and Annadel State Park, creating an outstanding 8-mile (13 km) recreational facility. Bird-watchers use these trails to observe geese, egrets, herons, hawks, woodpeckers, jays, warblers, and sparrows on the reservoir and in the surrounding woodlands.

Equestrian trails follow the perimeter of the reservoir and connect with trails in Annadel State Park. Mounts are not provided.

For the bicycle enthusiasts, there are 2.3 miles (3.7 km) of paved bicycle trails and many more miles of dirt trails. The maximum speed limit is 15 mph (24 km/h).

== Environmental Discovery Center ==
The Environmental Discovery Center at Spring Lake Regional Park features interactive exhibits about Sonoma County's plants, animals and natural resources, and a tide pool with live, touchable sea creatures. Programs are offered for children, families and schools and focus on environmental conservation and stewardship.

The Discovery Center is a partnership established by the Sonoma County Regional Parks Foundation and the Sonoma County Water Agency. Other sponsors include area government agencies and environmental groups.

== Fire Prevention Efforts ==
In the summer of 2025, Spring Lake began an effort to control vegetation in order to prevent fires. The park used a $250,000 settlement from Pacific Gas and Electric Company to have goats graze certain areas where the vegetation needs to be maintained.

The grazing effort reduces fire risk and is also beneficial for the ecosystems as a whole. Normal mechanical methods of grazing cause air pollution and other environmental detriments, while having goats graze the land provides a more natural solution that helps reduce the presence of invasive species.

Additionally, there are more traditional methods of fire prevention such as vegetation management and shaded fuel breaks. These efforts also fall under the 250,000 dollar grant from PG&E, who faced pushback after the 2017 Northern California wildfires.

== Park History ==
Spring Lake Regional Park was founded in 1973 in Santa Rosa, California and has since grown into one of the county’s most popular parks. In its first year of operation, it had around 35,000 recorded visitors. In modern years, the park expects closer to 650,000 annual visitors. As the visitor base grew larger, more recreational activities were added including fishing, wild-life viewing, and educational programs for children. Local officials continue to maintain the amenities including the paved roads, picnic tables, and other infrastructure in the park.

Spring Lake is man-made, built originally to help with flood-prevention efforts. It allows water to be diverted from Spring Creek and Santa Rosa Creek, thus preventing fire in the downtown Santa Rosa area. Due to this history, Spring Lake was built to handle intense storms, only ever exceeding its capacity in 1986.

== Surrounding Parks ==
Spring Lake is surrounded by other nearby parks, notably the Trionne Annadel State Park and Howarth Park.

=== Trionne Annadel State Park ===
Trionne Annadel State Park connects to Spring Lake and has over 45 miles of trail. The Wappo and Southern Pomo Tribes used to live on the land, and eventually became a site of extraction for volcanic rock and cobblestone. These extractions were then shipped to the Bay Area to pave the streets of San Francisco. In 1971, Annadel became an official state park in order to resist development efforts. It was named after the Trionne family who was integral in the resistance to development.

Annadel is also home to Lake Ilsanjo, a man-made lake that was built for fishing. Visitors of Annadel are able to camp at Spring Lake Regional Park in the available sites, as the trails connect which gives easy access to both parks.

=== Howarth Park ===
Howarth Park is a nearby connecting park that has recreational activities such as tennis, pickleball, and playground structures. The hiking trails connect to both Spring Lake and Trionne Annadel State Park, drawing in more visitors to the area.

== Indigenous Tribe ==
The Southern Pomo Tribe is indigenous to the Spring Lake Area. They lived a hunter-gatherer lifestyle and engaged in basket weaving as a cultural activity. Importantly, the Southern Pomo Tribe lived in harmony with the surrounding land. This harmony was ultimately disrupted when Europeans made contact with the land in 1831 and began mining efforts. However, with the local and state park protections of Spring Lake and the surrounding land, the integrity of the land can be better preserved.

== See also ==
- Annadel State Park
- List of Sonoma County Regional Parks facilities
- Santa Rosa Creek
- Spring Creek (Sonoma County, California)
