= Spring Creek (Sonoma County, California) =

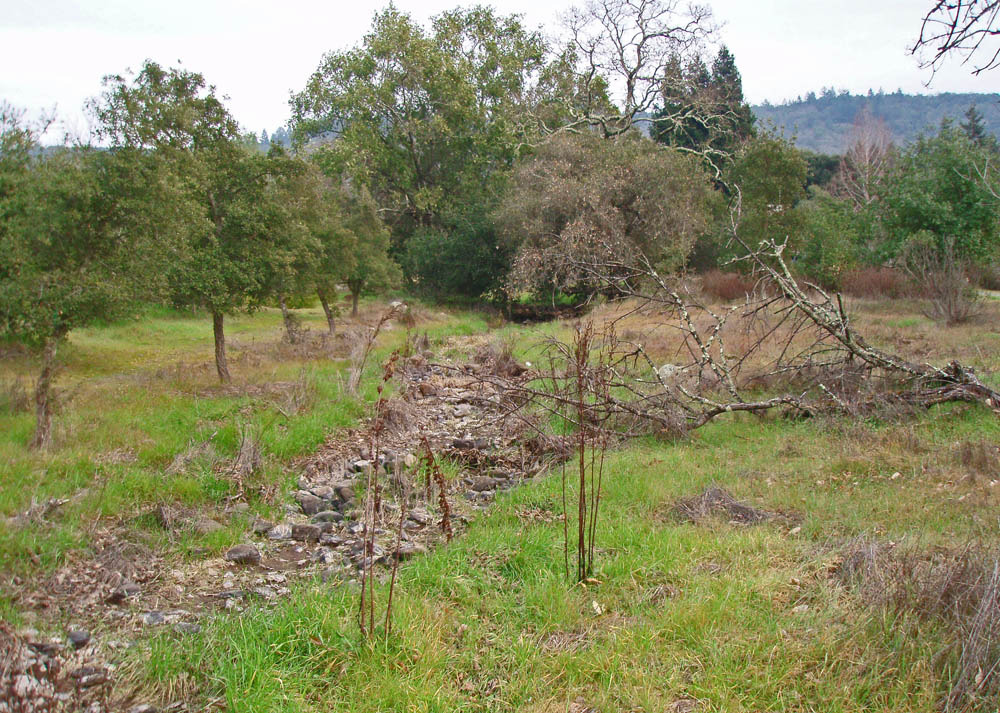
- Spring Creek streambed high in headwaters area

- Location of the mouth of Spring Creek in California

Location
- Country: United States
- State: California
- Region: Sonoma County
- City: Santa Rosa, California

Physical characteristics
- Source: Bennett Mountain
  - location: Annadel State Park
  - coordinates: 38°25′18″N 122°36′46″W
  - elevation: 1,220 ft (370 m)
- Mouth: Matanzas Creek
  - location: west end of Doyle Park in Santa Rosa, California
  - coordinates: 38°26′21″N 122°42′1″W
  - elevation: 164 ft (50 m)

Spring Creek, located in Sonoma County, California, is a 6.0-mile-long (9.7 km) stream that rises in the northern part of the Sonoma Mountains within Annadel State Park.It drains the western slopes of Bennett Mountain and feeds into Matanzas Creek at Doyle Community Park, below the Matanzas Creek Reservoir.

The waters of Spring Creek ultimately reach the Pacific Ocean just south of Jenner, California, flowing through Matanzas Creek, Santa Rosa Creek, the Laguna de Santa Rosa, Mark West Creek, and the Russian River.

== Gallery ==
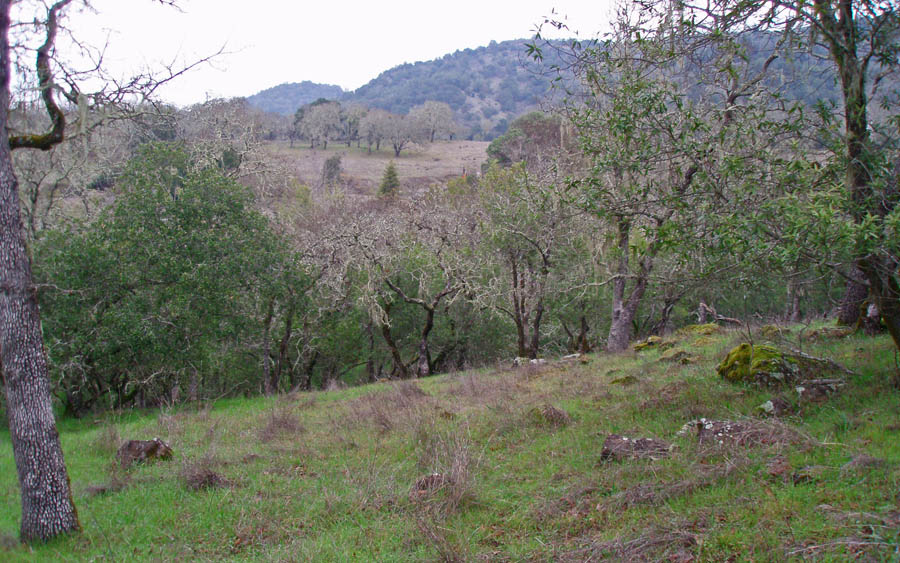
Spring Creek watershed of headwaters area.

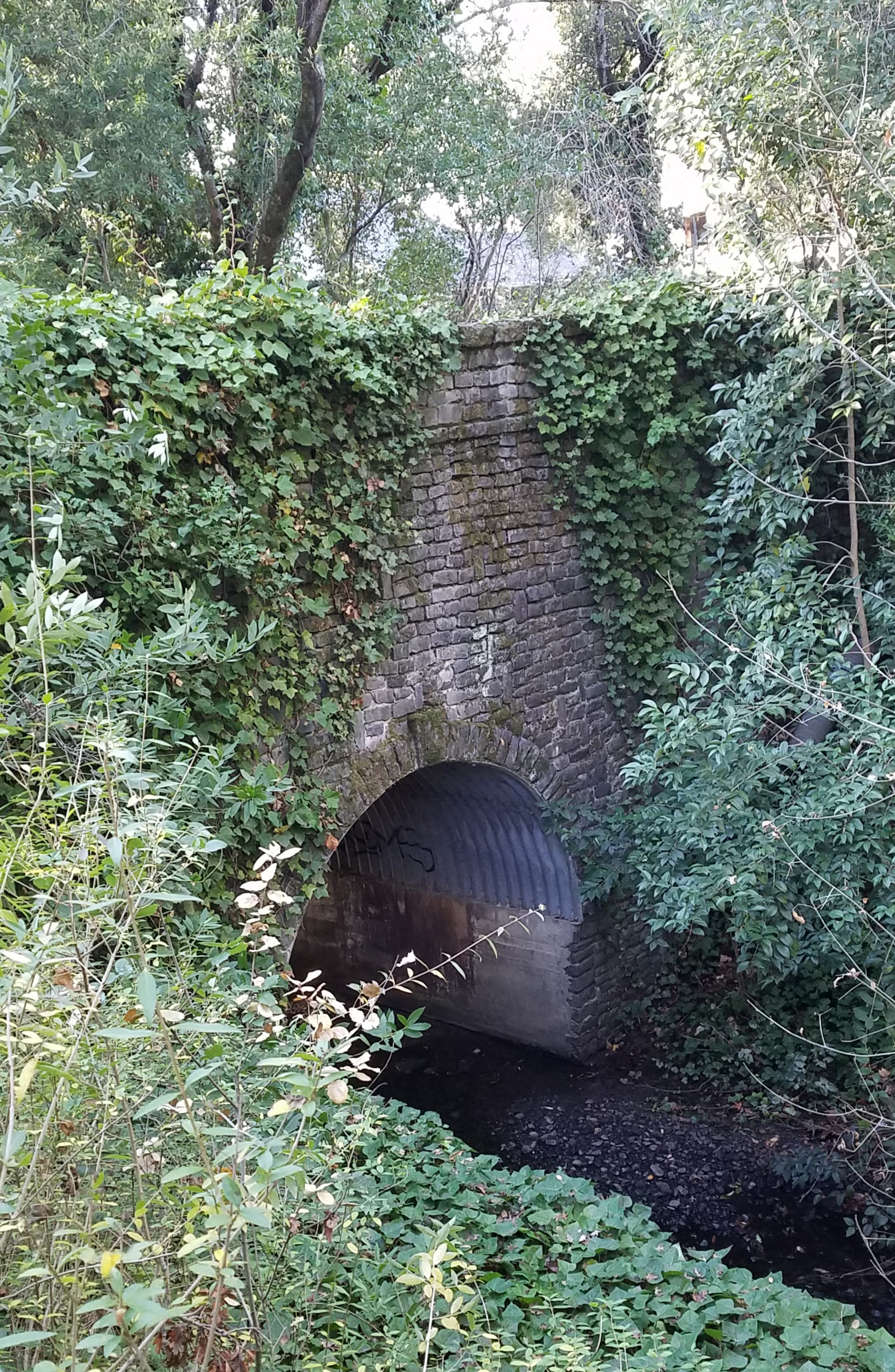
Bridge over Spring Creek at Doyle Community Park.

== See also ==
- Lake Ralphine
- List of watercourses in the San Francisco Bay Area
- Pomo people
- Spring Lake Regional Park
