= Novato, California =

City in California, United States

- City
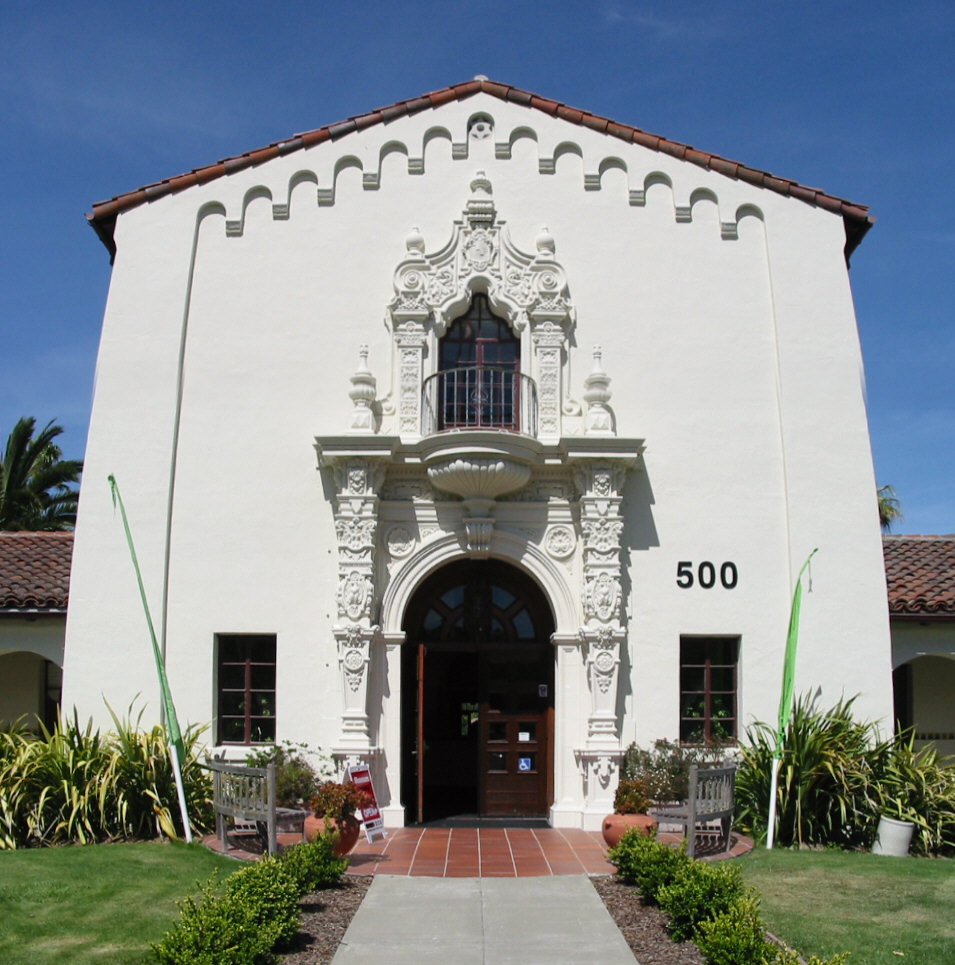
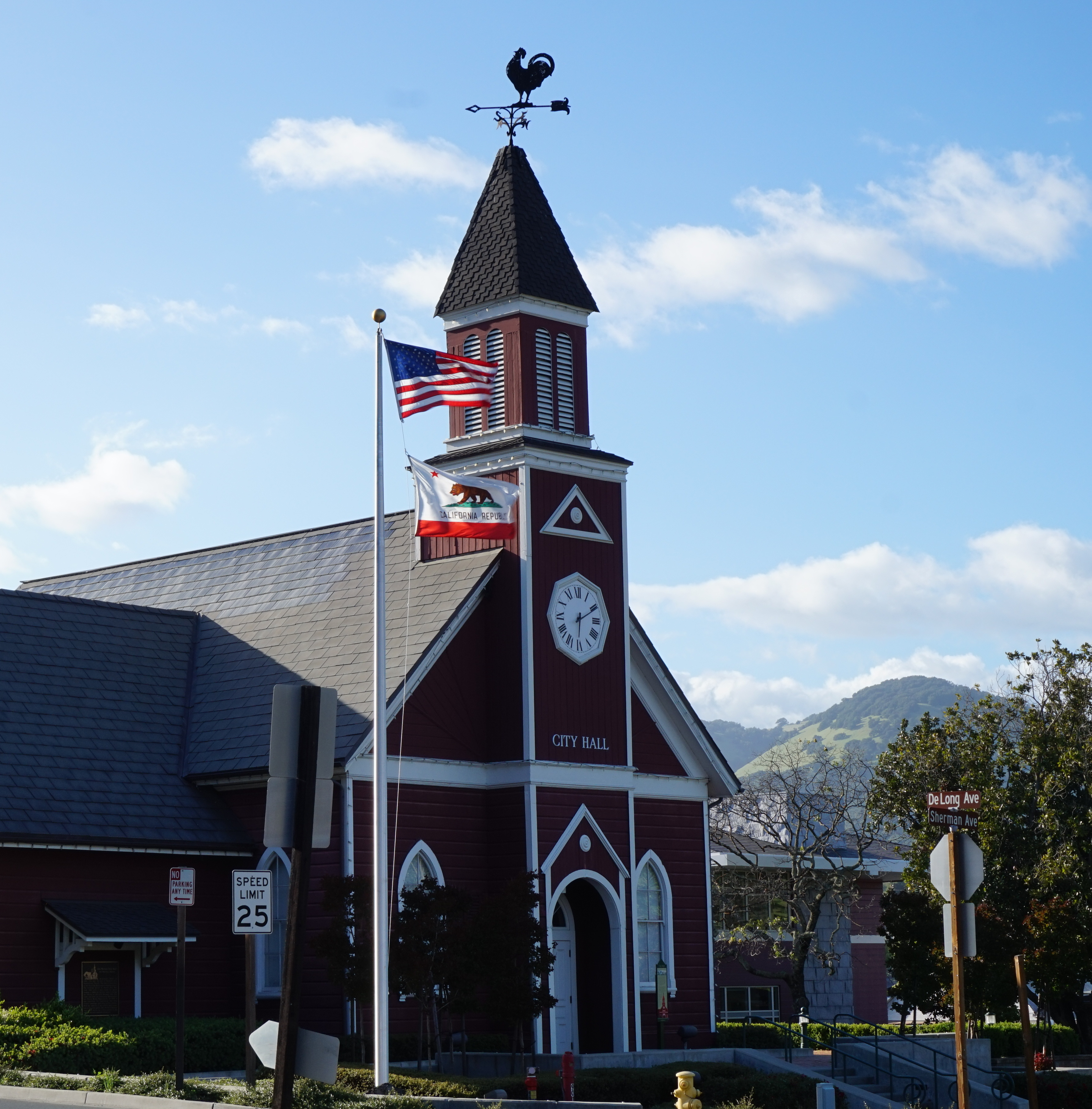
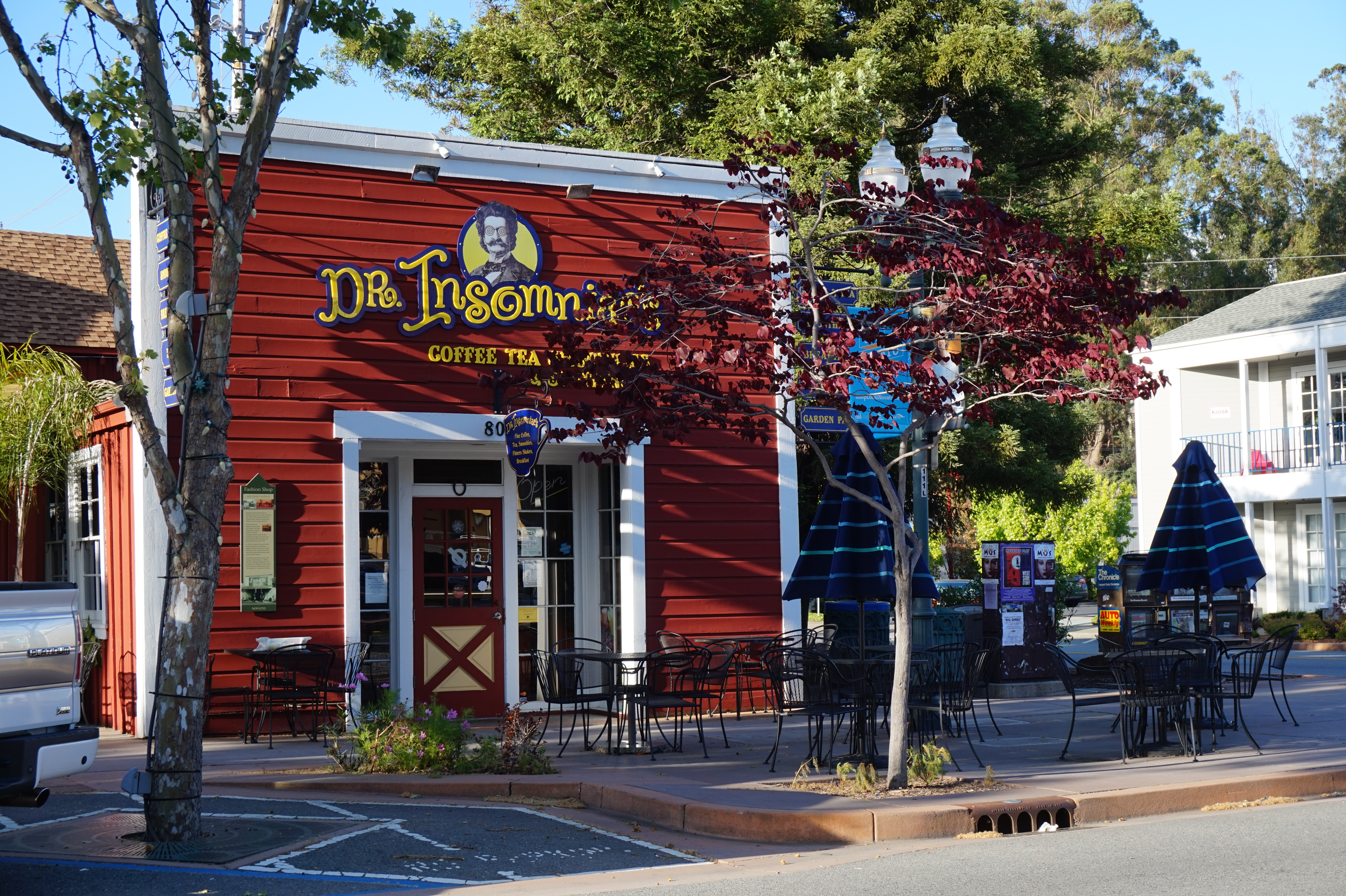
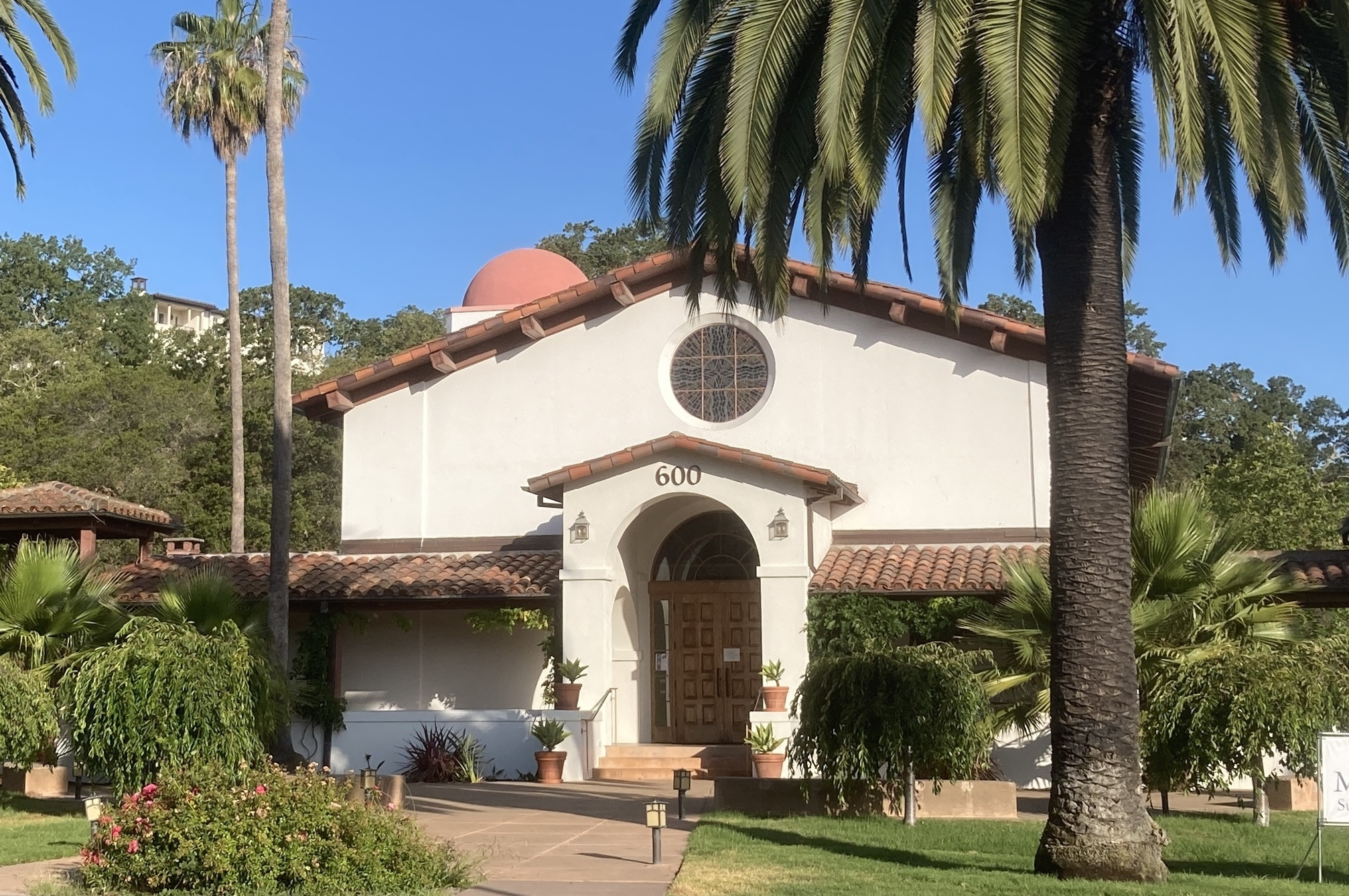
- Clockwise from left: Marin Museum of Contemporary Art; City Hall; Unity Church; Downtown Novato. Motto: "The place to be"
- Nickname: Valley of No Regrets
- Interactive map of Novato, California
- Location in the United States
- Coordinates: 38°06′27″N 122°34′11″W
- Country: United States
- State: California
- County: Marin
- Incorporated: January 20, 1960

Government
  - Mayor: Tim O'Connor
  - County Board: Districts 5 & 4 Eric Lucan; Dennis Rodoni
  - State Senator: Mike McGuire (D)
  - Assemblymember: Damon Connolly (D)
  - U. S. Rep.: Jared Huffman (D)

Area
  - Total: 27.98 sq mi (72.48 km^{2})
  - Land: 27.48 sq mi (71.16 km^{2})
  - Water: 0.51 sq mi (1.32 km^{2}) 1.82%
- Elevation: 30 ft (9 m)

Population (2020)
  - Total: 53,225
  - Estimate (2025): 51,947
  - Density: 1,937/sq mi (748.0/km^{2})
  - Demonym: Novatan
- Time zone: UTC−8 (Pacific)
  - Summer (DST): UTC−7 (PDT)
- ZIP Codes: 94945, 94947–94949, 94998
- Area codes: 415/628
- FIPS code: 06-52582
- GNIS feature IDs: 277612, 2411283
- Website: www.novato.gov

Novato (Spanish for "Novatus") is a city in Marin County, California, United States, situated in the North Bay region of the San Francisco Bay Area. At the 2020 census, Novato had a population of 53,225.

== History ==
What is now Novato was originally the site of several Coast Miwok villages: Chokecherry, near downtown Novato; Puyuku, near Ignacio; and Olómpali, at the present-day Olompali State Historic Park.

=== Mexican era ===
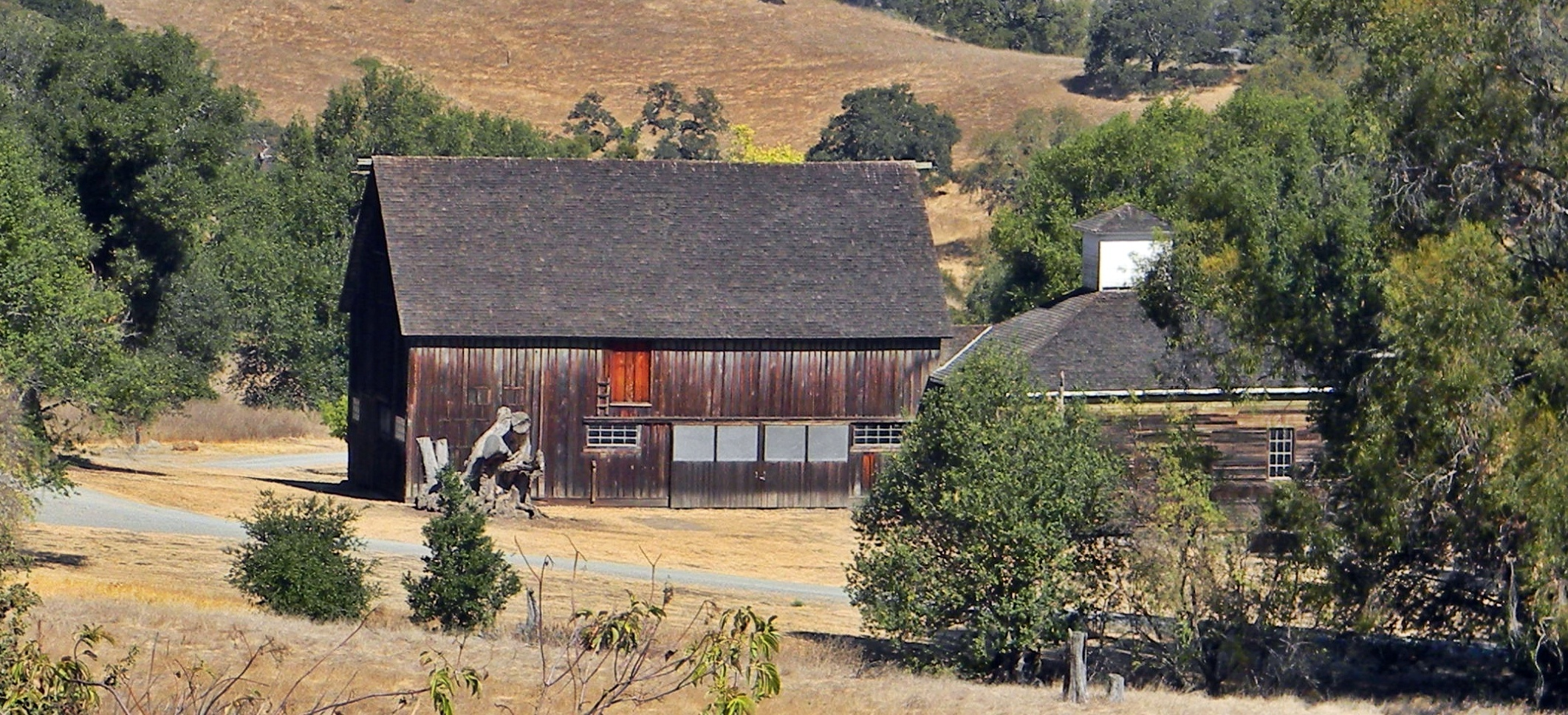
Rancho Olómpali was granted in 1834 by Governor Manuel Micheltorena to Miwok ranchero Camilo Ynitia.

In 1839, the Mexican government granted the 8,876-acre (35.92 km^{2}) Rancho Novato to Fernando Feliz. The rancho was named after a local Miwok leader who had probably been given the name of Saint Novatus at his baptism. Subsequently, four additional land grants were made in the area: Rancho Corte Madera de Novato, to John Martin in 1839; Rancho San Jose, to Ignacio Pacheco in 1840; Rancho Olómpali, awarded in 1843 to Camilo Ynitia, son of a Coast Miwok chief; and Rancho Nicasio, by far the largest at 56,621 acres (229.1 km^{2}), awarded to Pablo de la Guerra and John B.R. Cooper in 1844.

=== Post-Conquest era ===
Following the American Conquest of California and the Treaty of Guadalupe Hidalgo, Novato, along with the rest of California, became part of the United States on February 2, 1848. Early pioneers included Joseph Sweetser and Francis De Long who bought 15,000 acres (61 km^{2}) in the mid-1850s and planted orchards and vineyards.

The first post office at Novato opened in 1856; it closed in 1860, and a new post office opened in 1891.

The first school was built in 1859, at the corner of Grant Avenue and what is today Redwood Boulevard.

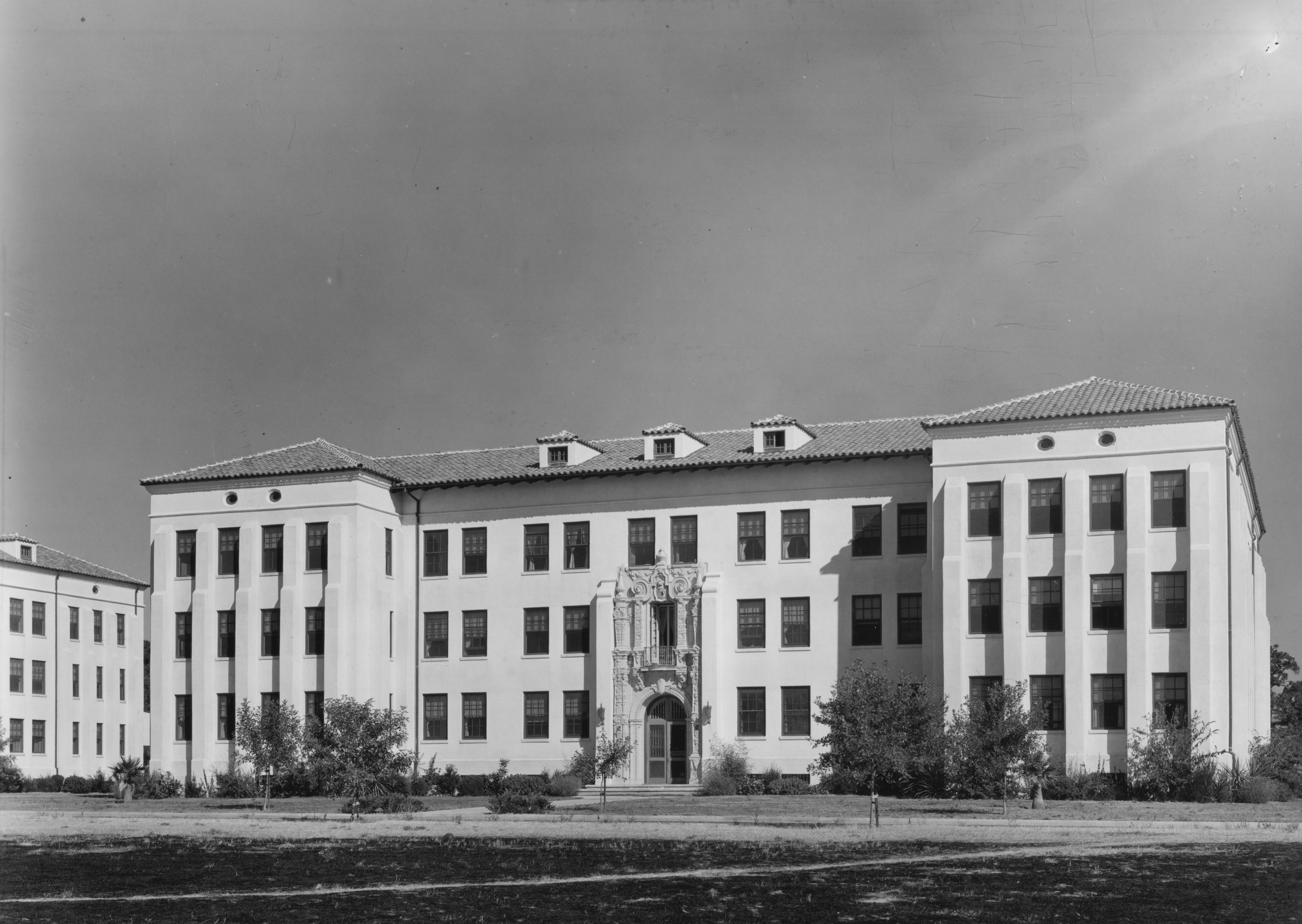
California Churrigueresque architecture at Hamilton Airfield, 1936

The original town was located around Novato Creek at what is now South Novato Boulevard. A railroad was built in 1879, connecting Novato to Sonoma County and San Rafael. The area around the train depot became known as New Town, and forms the edge of what today is Old Town Novato. The Novato Flatiron Building was built in 1908.

=== Modern era ===
The Great Depression of the 1930s had a marked effect on the area, as many farmers lost their land. After World War II, Novato grew quickly with the construction of tract homes and a freeway. As the area was unincorporated, much of the growth was unplanned and uncontrolled.

Novato was finally incorporated as a city in 1960. One of the most important events of the time (1960 to 1965) was "Western Weekend". Beard-growing contests, sponsored by Bob's Barber Shop, and many other odd activities helped to bring this community together.

Novato was the home of the members of the Grateful Dead for a period of time, largely centered around Rancho Olompali and the ranch of Mickey Hart. Novato also housed the commercial headquarters of the band's merchandise production.

Novato is considered one of the birthplaces of American enduro mountain bike racing.

== Geography ==
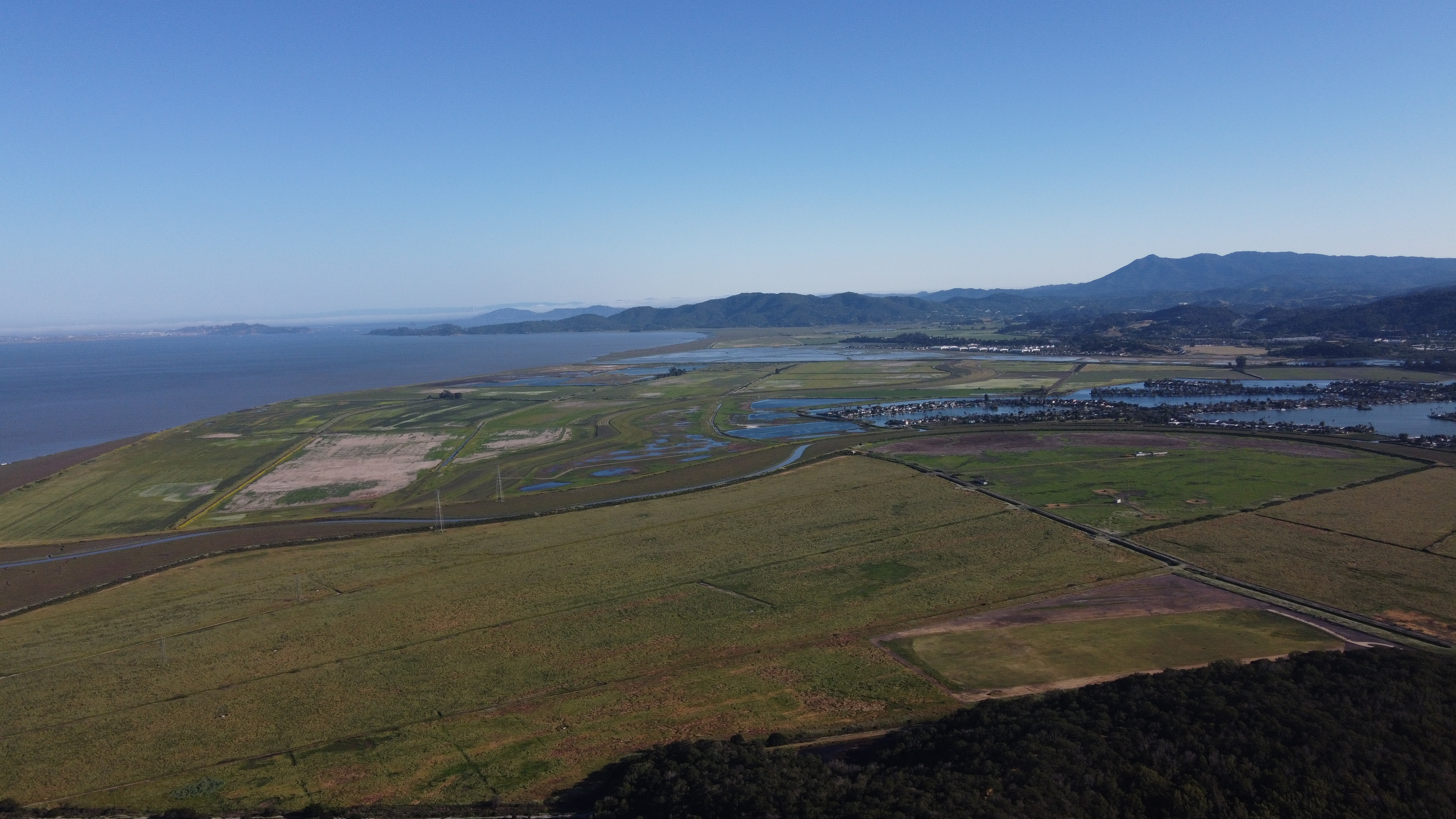
Diked fields in Eastern Novato

According to the United States Census Bureau, Novato has a total area of 28.0 square miles (73 km^{2}) and is the largest city in area in Marin County. A total of 27.5 square miles (71 km^{2}) is land and 0.5 square miles (1.3 km^{2}) (1.82%) is water.

The southwestern part of Novato is significantly more mountainous, whereas eastern Novato is characterized by marshland and diked fields and pastures. Novato Creek flows into the San Pablo Bay just north of Bel Marin Keys.

Major geographical features nearby include Mount Burdell and Mount Burdell Open Space Preserve to the north and Big Rock Ridge to the southwest. Stafford Lake to the west is a secondary water supply for Novato, with the Russian River in Sonoma County to the north supplying 80% of the city's water.

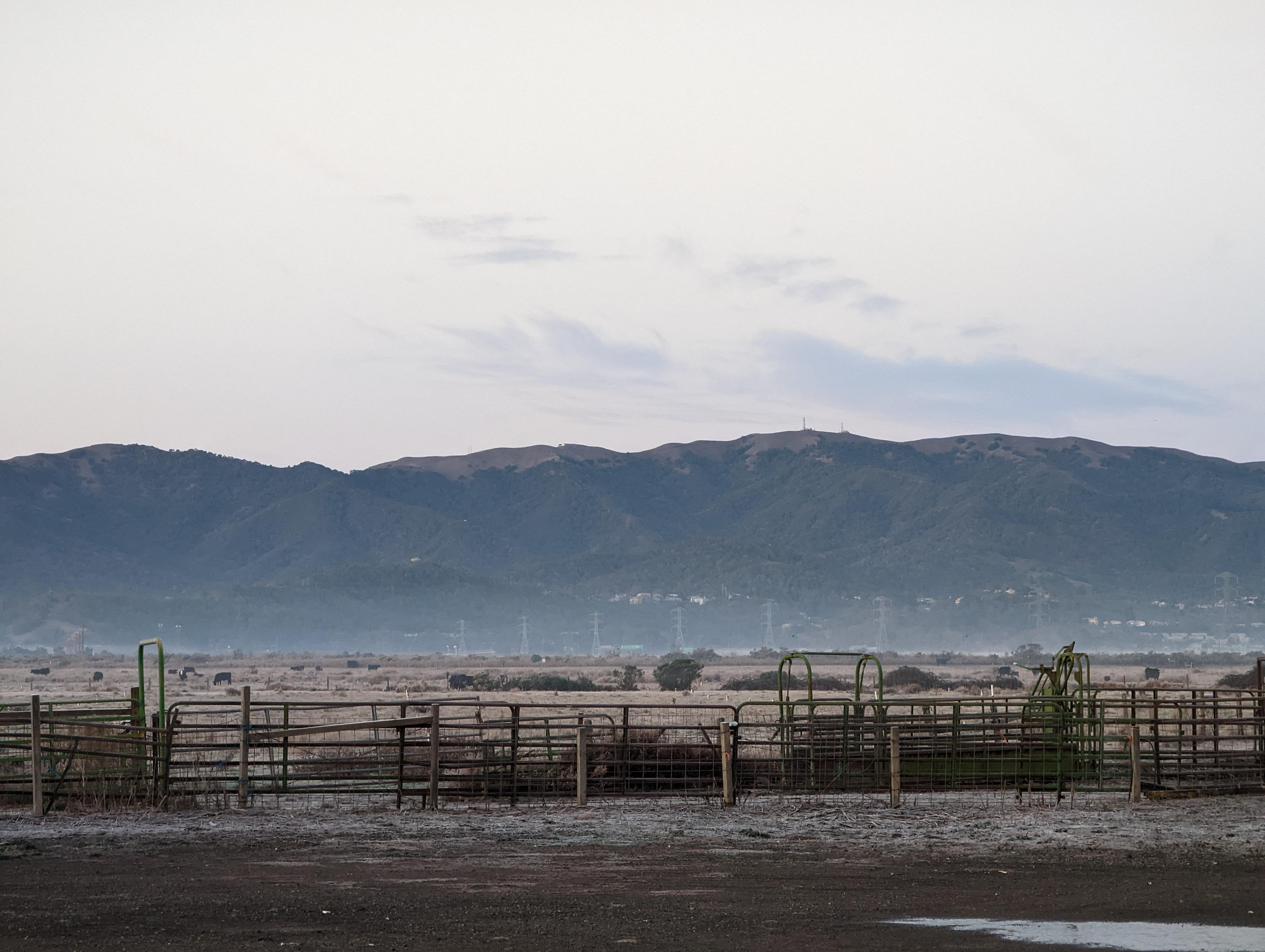
Big Rock Ridge, the highest point in Novato

Novato includes ten Marin County Open Space District preserves: Mount Burdell, Rush Creek, Little Mountain, Verissimo Hills, Indian Tree, Deer Island, Indian Valley, Ignacio Valley, Loma Verde, and Pacheco Valle. Although Novato is located on the San Pablo Bay, access to the water is largely blocked by expansive farmland and wetlands.

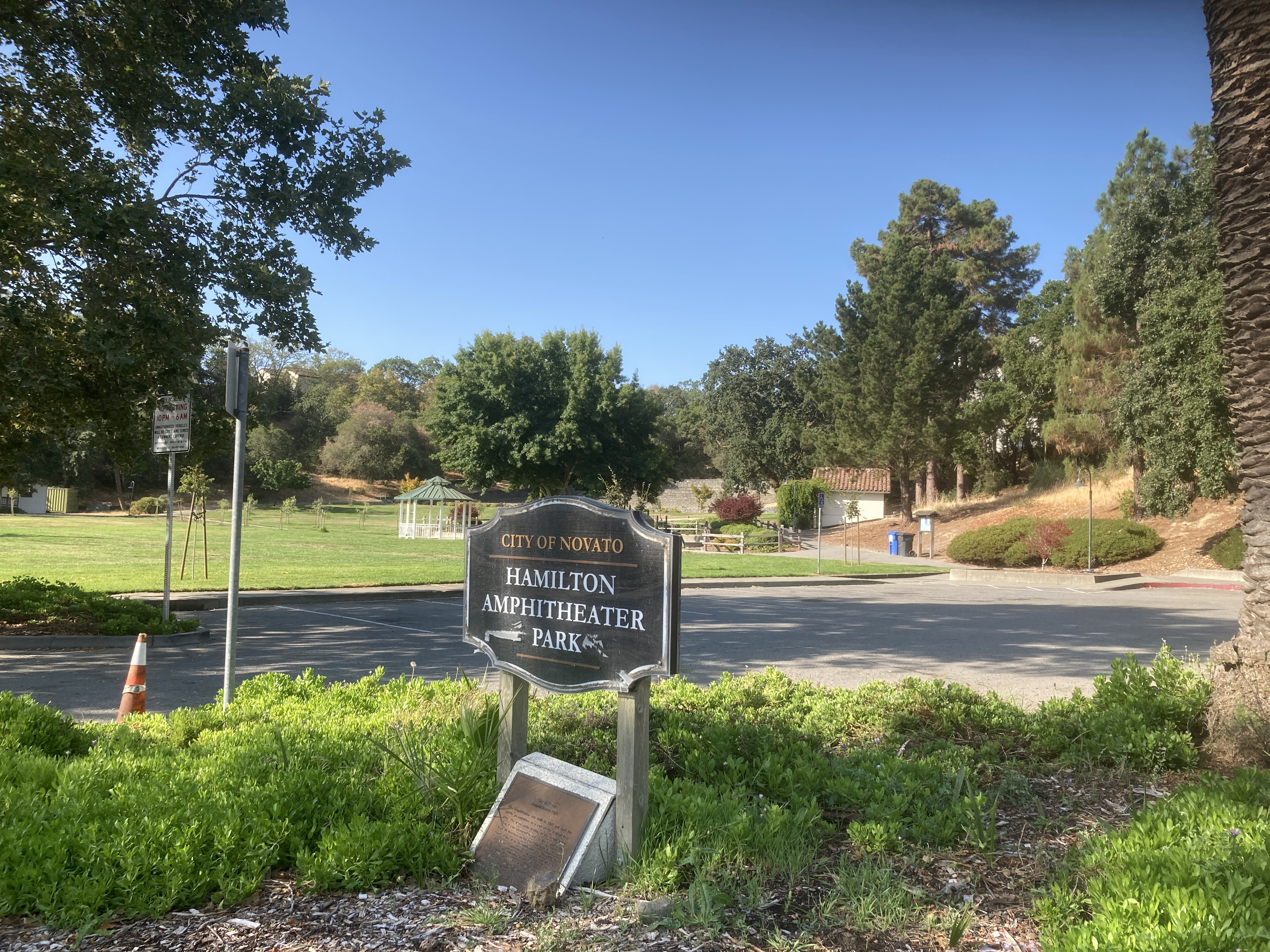
Hamilton Amphitheater Park

=== Climate ===
Official weather observations were taken at Hamilton Air Force Base through 1964. Average January temperatures were a maximum of 53.6 °F (12.0 °C) and a minimum of 38.7 °F (3.7 °C). Average July temperatures were a maximum of 79.9 °F (26.6 °C) and a minimum of 52.0 °F (11.1 °C). There were an average of 12.4 days with highs of 90 °F (32 °C) or higher and an average of 12.5 days with lows of 32 °F (0 °C) or lower. The record high temperature was 111 °F (44 °C) on September 5, 2022. The record low temperature was 16 °F (−9 °C) in December 2013. Average annual precipitation was 25.49 inches (64.7 cm). The wettest year was 1940 with 46.63 inches (118.4 cm) and the driest year was 2015 with 6.35 inches (16.1 cm). The most rainfall in one month was 18.87 inches (47.9 cm) in December 1955. The most rainfall in 24 hours was 10.55 inches (26.8 cm) between December 10, 2014 – December 11, 2014. Today, the nearest National Weather Service cooperative weather station is in San Rafael, where records date back to 1894. Compared to records from Hamilton Air Force Base, San Rafael is generally several degrees warmer than Novato and has an average of about 10 inches (25 cm) more rainfall. The record high temperature in San Rafael was 110 °F (43 °C) on September 7, 1904, and June 14, 1961. The record low temperature was 20 °F (−7 °C) on December 26, 1967.

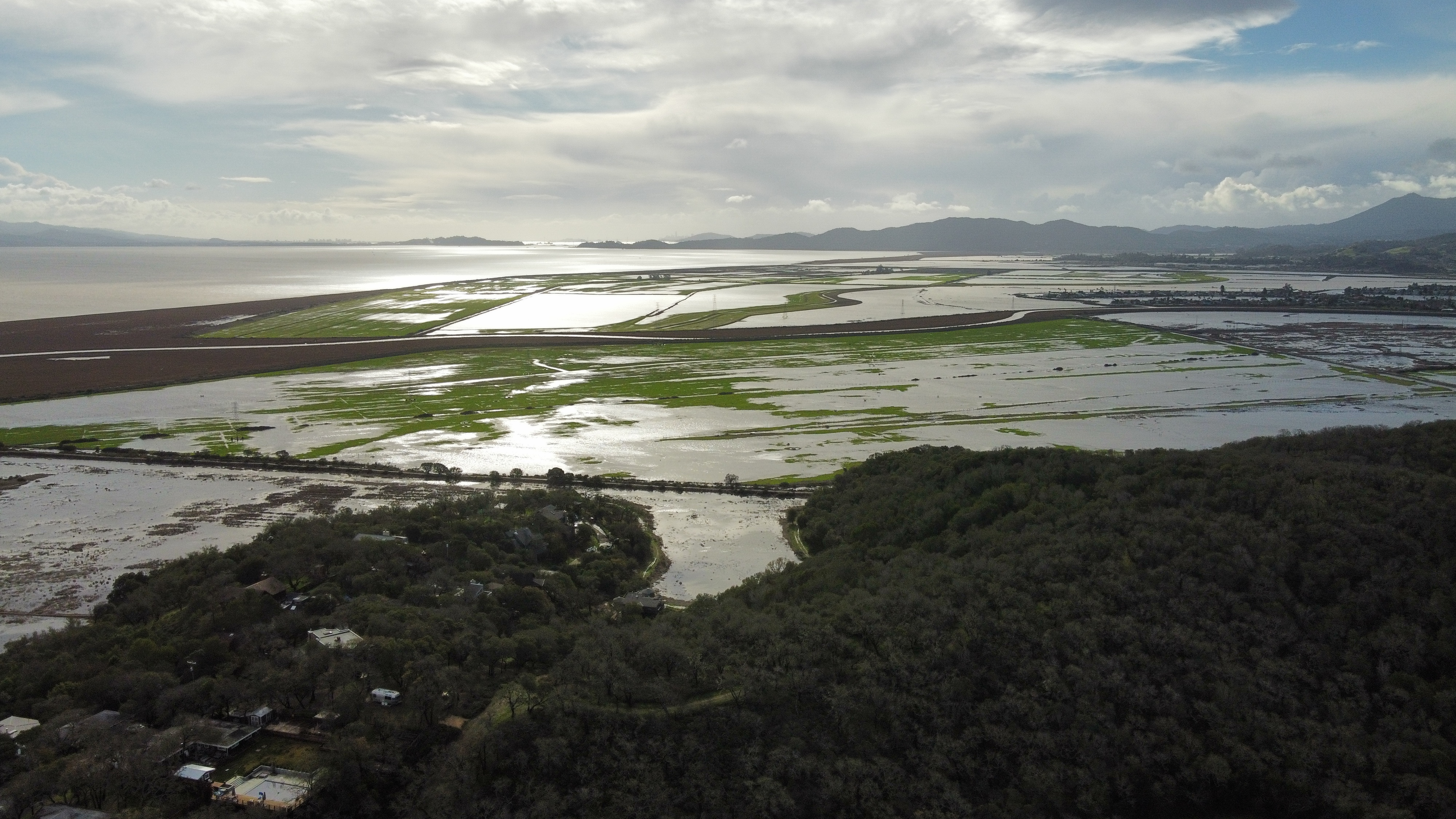
Flooding in Northeastern Novato

According to the Köppen Climate Classification system, Novato has a warm-summer mediterranean climate, abbreviated "Csb" on climate maps. This means that Summers are Hot, but Winters are rainy and can be mild to chilly. Precipitation occurs in the colder seasons, but there are a number of clear sunny days even during the wetter seasons, except during spells of seasonal tule fog, when it can be quite chilly for many days. Its hardiness zone is 9b (25 to 30 °F; −4 to −1 °C.

Novato has a history of flooding due to its low-lying position, as well as the fact that much of the city used to be marshland. Due to the system of levees in Eastern Novato, flooding is quite common in that area, both from excessive rain and levee breaches.

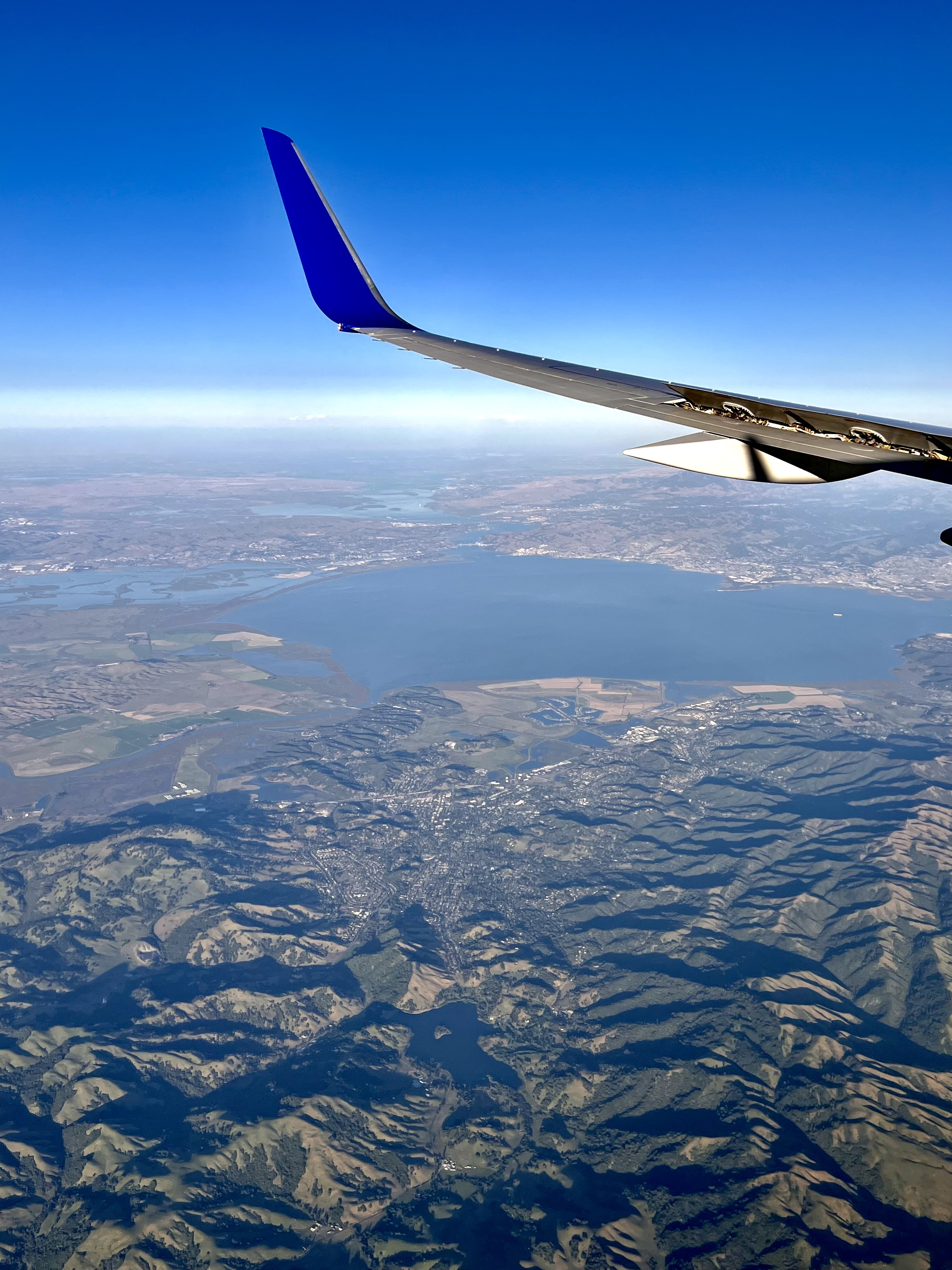
Aerial view of Novato, looking southeast. Stafford Lake is visible in the foreground and San Pablo Bay in the background beneath the plane's wing.

Climate data for Novato, California (Hamilton Army Airfield)
Month	Jan	Feb	Mar	Apr	May	Jun	Jul	Aug	Sep	Oct	Nov	Dec	Year
Record high °F (°C)	77 (25)	77 (25)	87 (31)	89 (32)	102 (39)	106 (41)	102 (39)	102 (39)	107 (42)	96 (36)	83 (28)	73 (23)	107 (42)
Mean daily maximum °F (°C)	53.6 (12.0)	58.9 (14.9)	62.6 (17.0)	67.4 (19.7)	71.6 (22.0)	77.4 (25.2)	79.9 (26.6)	78.9 (26.1)	79.4 (26.3)	72.5 (22.5)	63.0 (17.2)	55.2 (12.9)	68.4 (20.2)
Daily mean °F (°C)	46.2 (7.9)	50.4 (10.2)	52.8 (11.6)	56.3 (13.5)	59.9 (15.5)	64.3 (17.9)	65.9 (18.8)	65.4 (18.6)	65.5 (18.6)	60.4 (15.8)	53.1 (11.7)	47.8 (8.8)	57.3 (14.1)
Mean daily minimum °F (°C)	38.7 (3.7)	42.0 (5.6)	42.9 (6.1)	45.3 (7.4)	48.2 (9.0)	51.3 (10.7)	52.0 (11.1)	51.9 (11.1)	51.5 (10.8)	48.4 (9.1)	43.2 (6.2)	40.4 (4.7)	46.3 (8.0)
Record low °F (°C)	23 (−5)	25 (−4)	30 (−1)	33 (1)	37 (3)	41 (5)	43 (6)	44 (7)	38 (3)	30 (−1)	28 (−2)	26 (−3)	23 (−5)
Average precipitation inches (mm)	5.80 (147)	4.83 (123)	3.21 (82)	1.60 (41)	0.47 (12)	0.11 (2.8)	0.00 (0.00)	0.02 (0.51)	0.20 (5.1)	1.51 (38)	2.74 (70)	5.01 (127)	25.5 (648.41)
Average precipitation days (≥ 0.01 in)	11	9	9	5	3	1	0	0	1	4	6	9	58
Source: Western Regional Climate Center

== Government ==
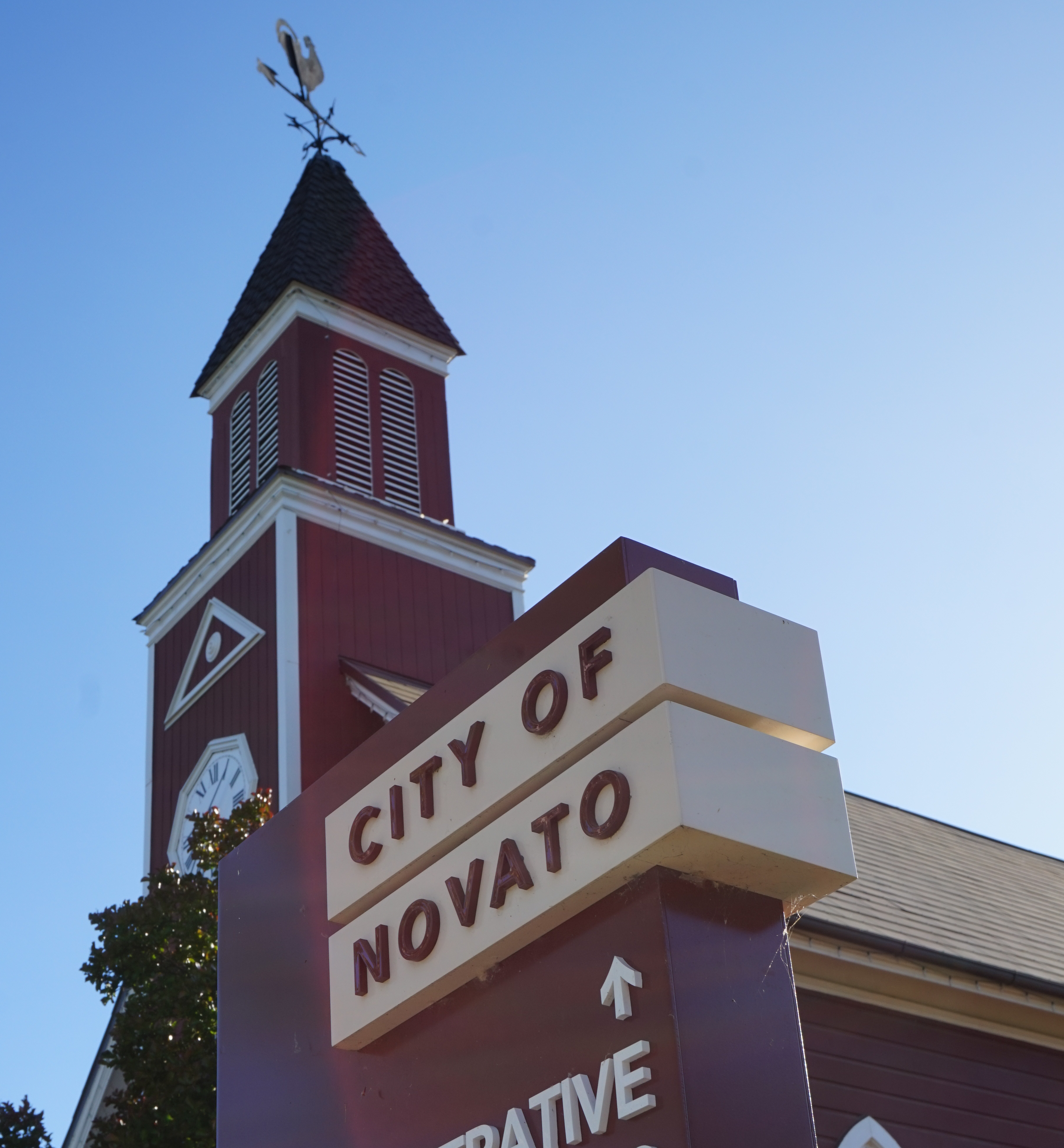
Novato City Hall

Novato is governed by a city council of five members. All five councilmembers are elected by city council districts to staggered four-year terms. The city council elects a mayor and mayor pro tem each year from its membership. The current councilmembers are:

- District 1 Councilmember: Kevin Jacobs (Mayor Pro Tem)
- District 2 Councilmember: Rachel Farac (Mayor)
- District 3 Councilmember: Tim O'Connor
- District 4 Councilmember: Pat Eklund
- District 5 Councilmember: Sandeep Karkal

In the United States House of Representatives, Novato is in California's 2nd congressional district, represented by Democrat Jared Huffman. From 2008 to 2012, Huffman represented Marin County in the California State Assembly.

In the California State Legislature, Novato is in:

- the 12th Assembly district, represented by Democrat Damon Connolly
- the 2nd senatorial district, represented by Democrat Mike McGuire

According to the California Secretary of State, as of February 10, 2019, Novato had 31,544 registered voters. Of those, 15,794 (50.1%) were registered Democrats, 6,048 (19.2%) were registered Republicans, and 8,188 (26%) declined to state a political party.

== Demographics ==
Historical population
Census	Pop.	Note	%±
1960	17,881		—
1970	31,006		73.4%
1980	43,916		41.6%
1990	47,585		8.4%
2000	47,630		0.1%
2010	51,904		9.0%
2020	53,225		2.5%
2025 (est.)	51,947	▼	−2.4%
U.S. Decennial Census; 1860–1870 1880-1890; 1900 1910 1920; 1930 1940 1950; 1960 1970 1980; 1990 2000 2010; 2020

=== 2020 census ===
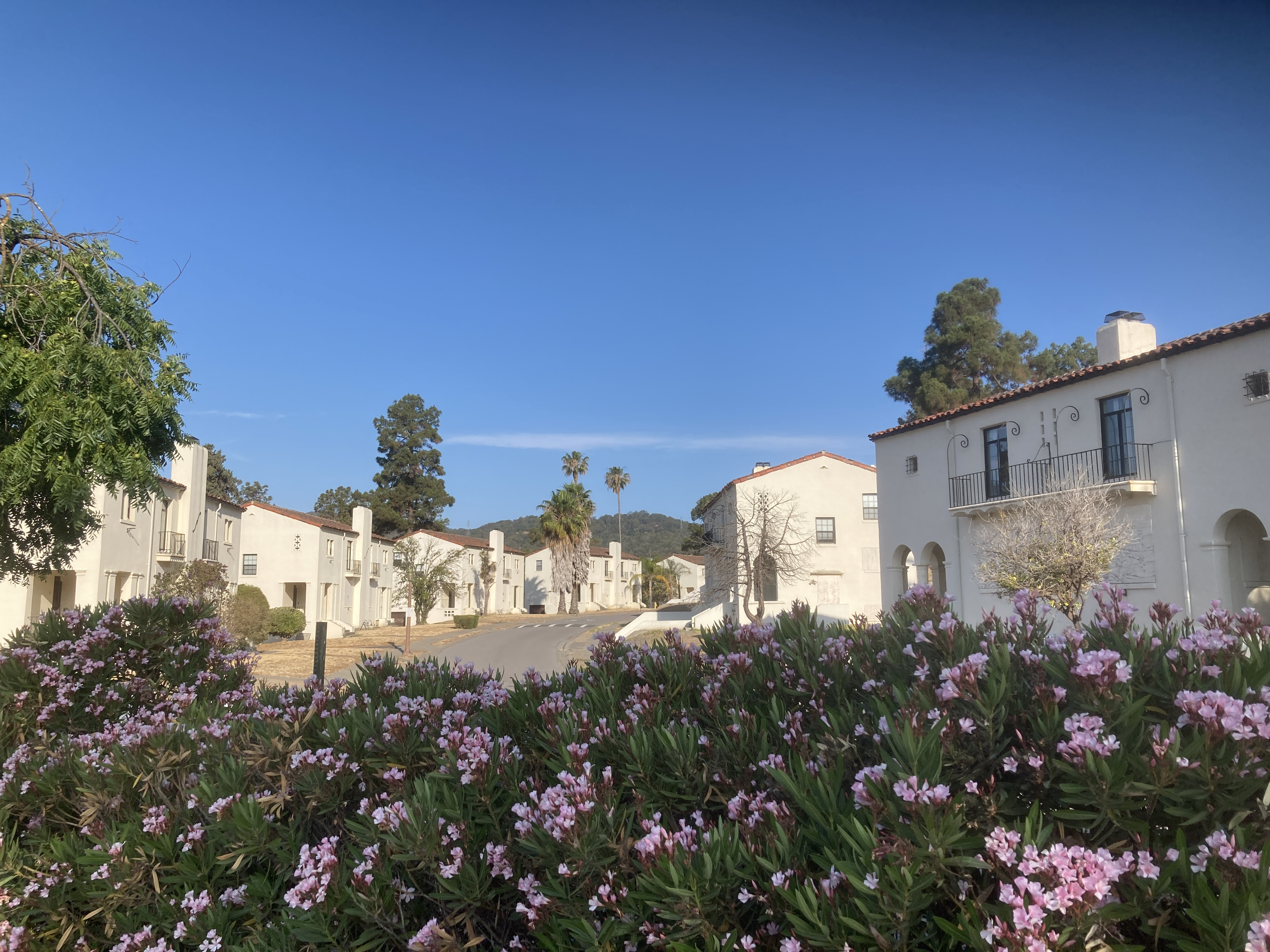
Spanish Colonial Revival homes at Hamilton Army Airfield

As of the 2020 census, Novato had a population of 53,225 and a population density of 1,937.2 inhabitants per square mile (748.0/km^{2}). 97.9% of residents lived in urban areas, while 2.1% lived in rural areas. The census reported that 98.8% of the population lived in households, 0.9% lived in non-institutionalized group quarters, and 0.3% were institutionalized.

There were 20,564 households, out of which 30.1% included children under the age of 18. Of all households, 51.4% were married-couple households, 5.9% were cohabiting-couple households, 28.1% had a female householder with no spouse or partner present, and 14.6% had a male householder with no spouse or partner present. 25.6% of households were one person, and 15.2% were one person aged 65 or older. There were 13,872 families (67.5% of all households).

The age distribution was 20.5% under the age of 18, 7.0% aged 18 to 24, 22.2% aged 25 to 44, 28.2% aged 45 to 64, and 22.1% who were 65 years of age or older. The median age was 45.3 years. For every 100 females, there were 92.5 males, and for every 100 females age 18 and over there were 89.6 males age 18 and over.

There were 21,271 housing units at an average density of 774.2 units per square mile (298.9 units/km^{2}). Of those units, 20,564 (96.7%) were occupied and 3.3% were vacant. Of occupied units, 66.1% were owner-occupied and 33.9% were occupied by renters. The homeowner vacancy rate was 0.5% and the rental vacancy rate was 3.6%.

Racial composition as of the 2020 census
Race	Number	Percent
White	32,509	61.1%
Black or African American	1,435	2.7%
American Indian and Alaska Native	961	1.8%
Asian	3,966	7.5%
Native Hawaiian and Other Pacific Islander	108	0.2%
Some other race	7,099	13.3%
Two or more races	7,147	13.4%
Hispanic or Latino (of any race)	13,615	25.6%

=== 2023 ACS 5-year estimates ===
In 2023, the US Census Bureau estimated that the median household income was $112,193, and the per capita income was $64,439. About 5.3% of families and 9.0% of the population were below the poverty line.

=== 2010 census ===
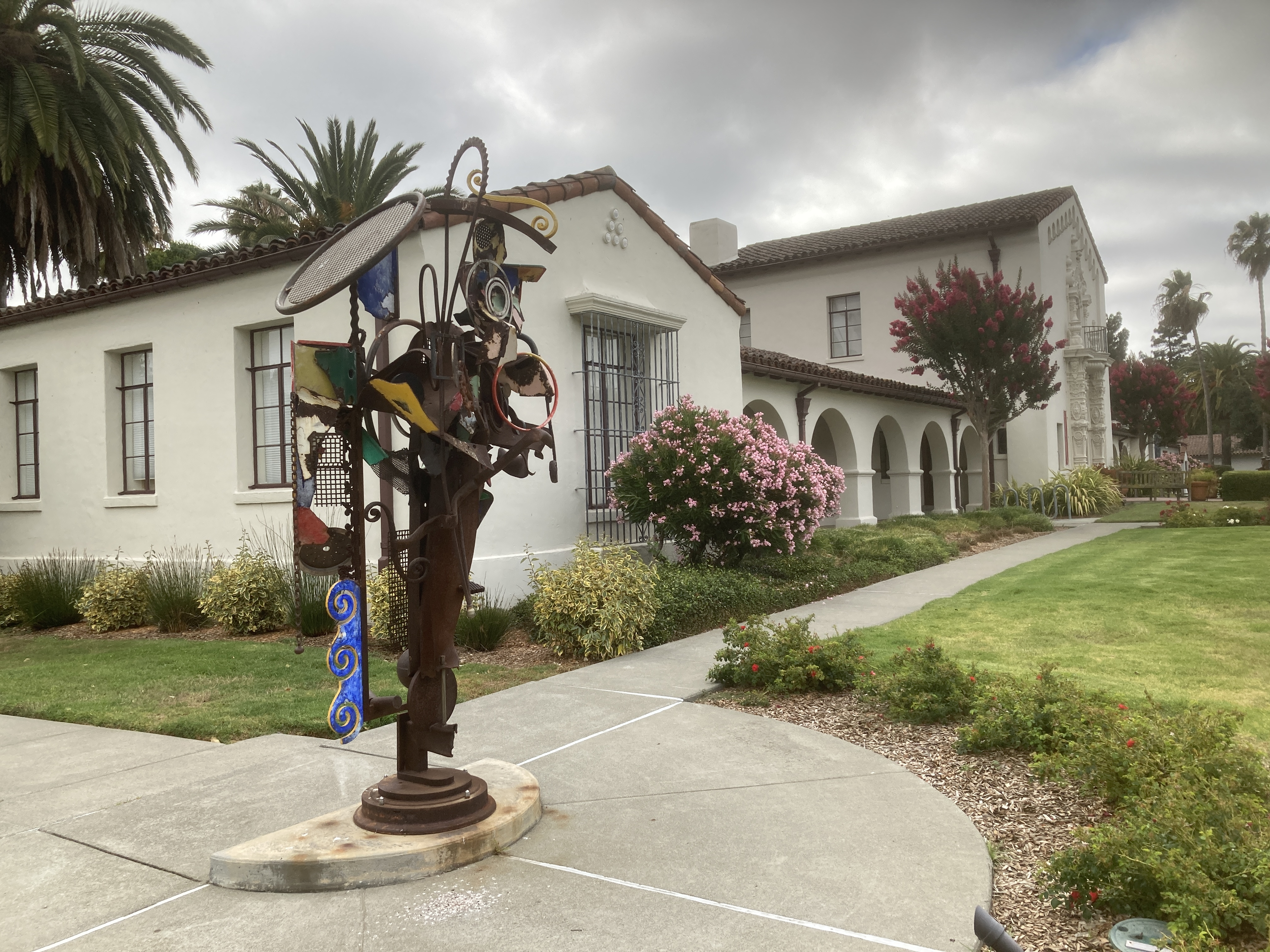
Marin Museum of Contemporary Art

At the 2010 census Novato had a population of 51,904. The population density was 1,856.6 inhabitants per square mile (716.8/km^{2}). The racial makeup of Novato was 39,443 (76.0%) White, 1,419 (2.7%) African American, 286 (0.6%) Native American, 3,428 (6.6%) Asian, 117 (0.2%) Pacific Islander, 4,693 (9.0%) from other races, and 2,518 (4.9%) from two or more races. There were 11,046 Hispanic or Latino residents (21.3%) of any race.

The census reported that 51,278 people (98.8% of the population) lived in households, 449 (0.9%) lived in non-institutionalized group quarters, and 177 (0.3%) were institutionalized.

There were 21,279 households, 6,679 (32.9%) had children under the age of 18 living in them, 10,393 (51.3%) were opposite-sex married couples living together, 2,237 (11.0%) had a female householder with no husband present, 854 (4.2%) had a male householder with no wife present. There were 1,010 (5.0%) unmarried opposite-sex partnerships, and 195 (1.0%) same-sex married couples or partnerships. 5,358 households (26.4%) were one person and 2,415 (11.9%) had someone living alone who was 65 or older. The average household size was 2.53. There were 13,484 families (66.5% of households); the average family size was 3.04.

The age distribution was 11,769 people (22.7%) under the age of 18, 3,355 people (6.5%) aged 18 to 24, 12,743 people (24.6%) aged 25 to 44, 15,914 people (30.7%) aged 45 to 64, and 8,123 people (15.7%) who were 65 or older. The median age was 42.6 years. For every 100 females, there were 93.6 males. For every 100 females age 18 and over, there were 90.1 males.

There were 21,158 housing units at an average density of 756.8 per square mile, of the occupied units 13,591 (67.0%) were owner-occupied and 6,688 (33.0%) were rented. The homeowner vacancy rate was 1.0%; the rental vacancy rate was 4.7%. 33,252 people (64.1% of the population) lived in owner-occupied housing units and 18,026 people (34.7%) lived in rental housing units.

== Economy ==
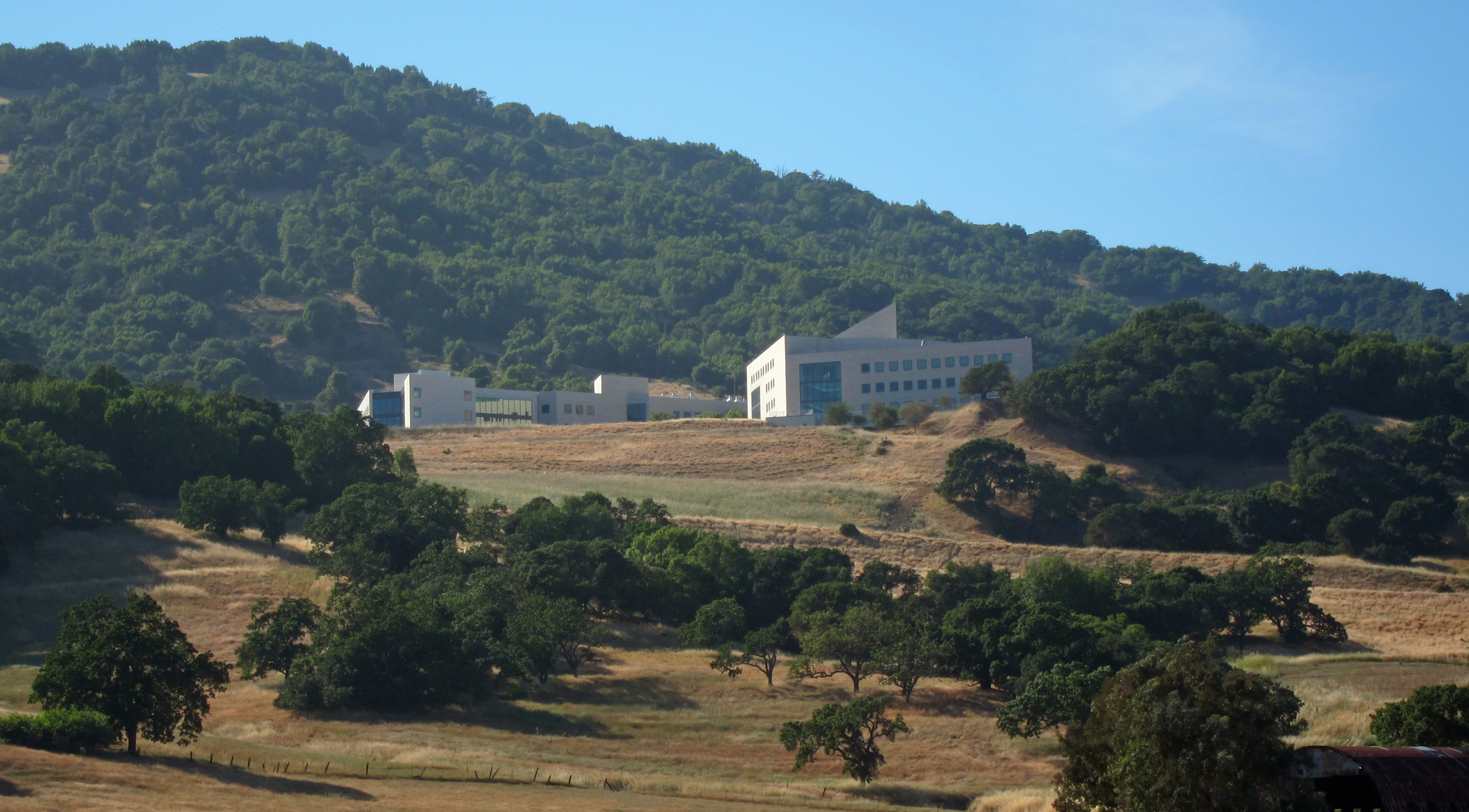
The Buck Institute for Research on Aging is a world leader in aging-associated diseases research.

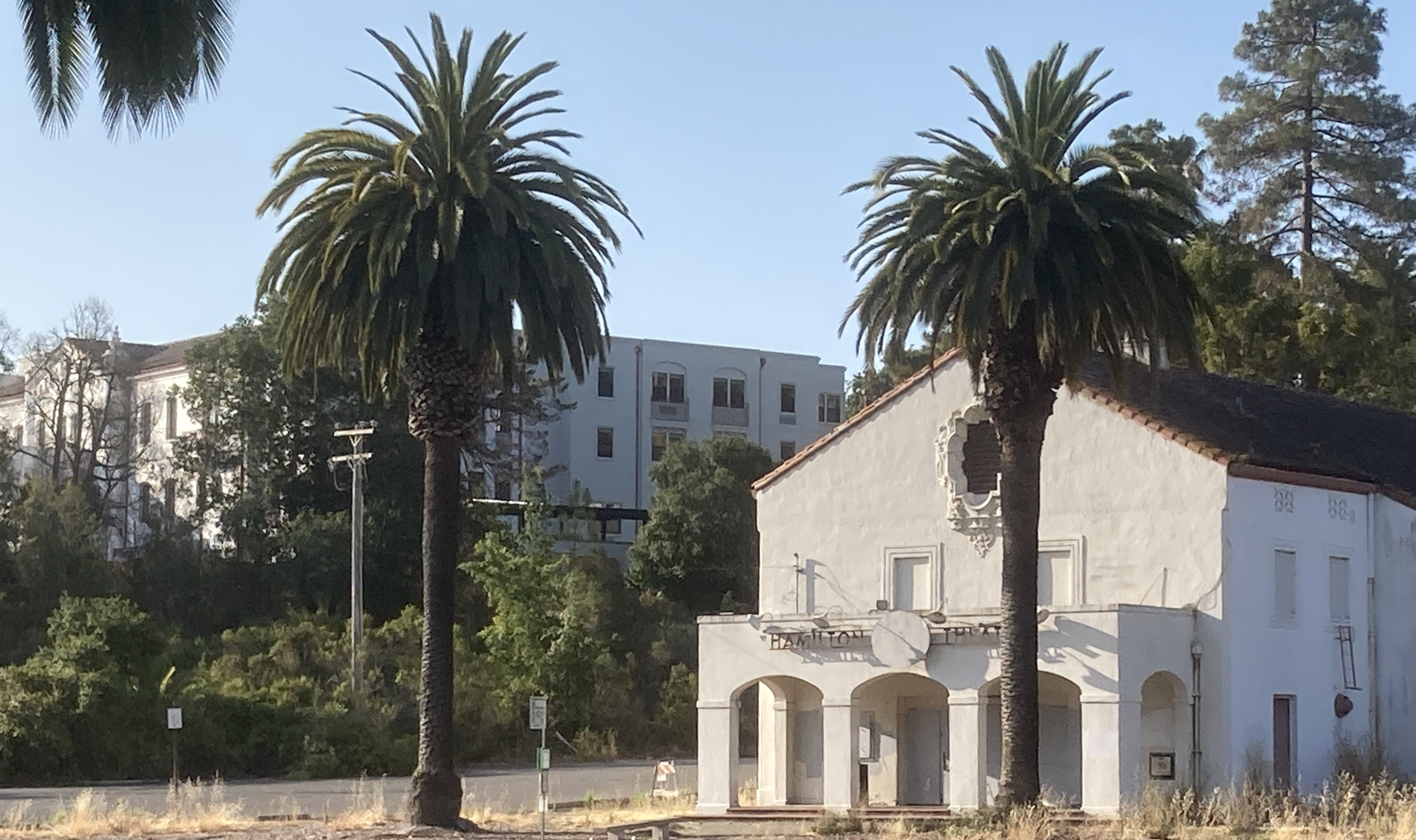
The historic Hamilton Theatre

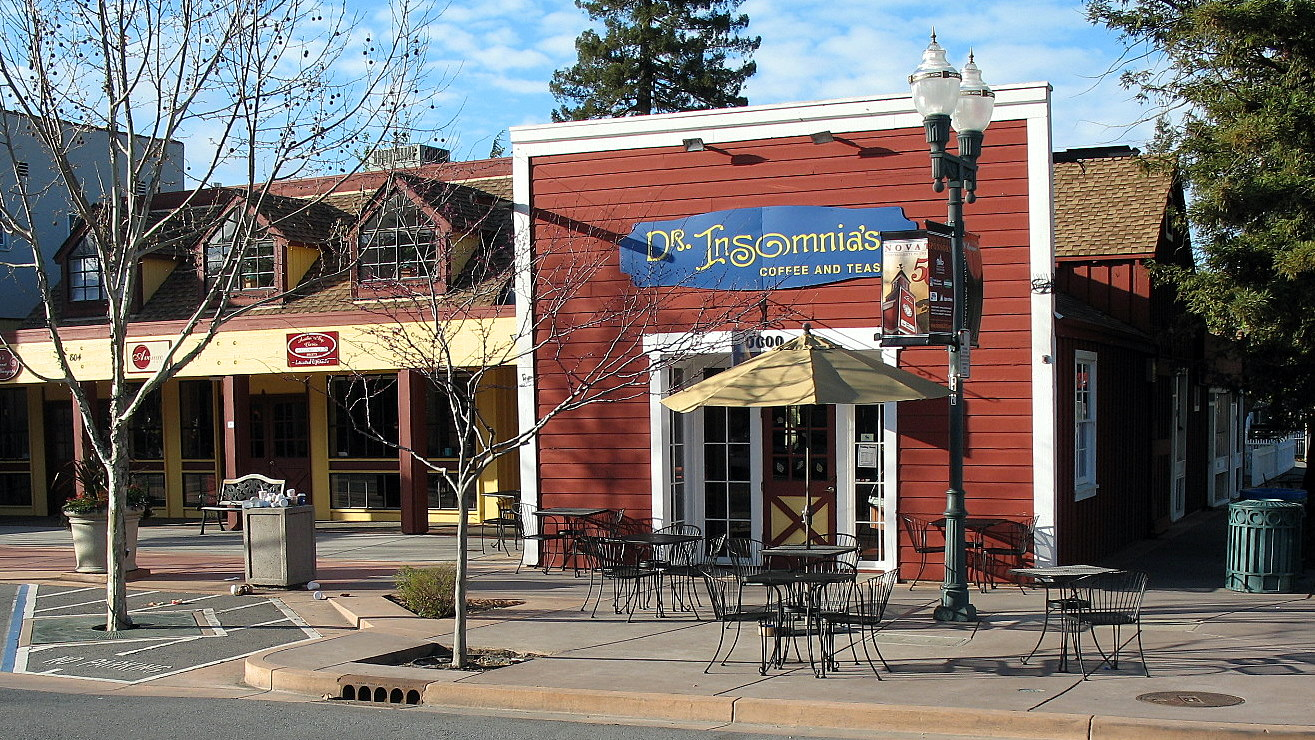
Doctor Insomniac's Coffee, a Historic Landmark on Grant Avenue

The city is home to the Buck Institute for Research on Aging, and several biotech firms, such as Biosearch Technologies, BioMarin Pharmaceutical and Ultragenyx. Several small technology companies are also based in Novato, such as 2K, Radiant Logic, Toys For Bob, One Legal, International Genetics Incorporated, Channel Management Solutions, Enwisen, Sonic Solutions and DriveSavers.

The former Hamilton Air Force Base is also located in Novato, but was decommissioned in 1974 and designated a Historic District in 1998. After lying stagnant for many years, major renovations were pushed through by then-mayor Michael DiGiorgio. As of 2008 the base has largely been redeveloped into single-family homes. The former hangar buildings were gutted and redeveloped into two-story office buildings; tenants include 2K Sports, Sony Imageworks, Visual Concepts, The Republic of Tea, Toys For Bob, and Birkenstock Distribution USA.

From 1983 to 1998, the iconic developer of video games, Brøderbund Software, was headquartered in Novato, known through games Choplifter, Lode Runner, Karateka, and Prince of Persia, and others. From the 1982 until 2015, Novato was headquarters for Fireman's Fund Insurance Company, which was Marin County's largest employer at one time, with 2,400 employees as of 2000. By 2015, the company had laid off or transferred most its employees and relocated its remaining employees to a smaller headquarters in nearby Petaluma.

In Eastern Novato, north of Hamilton, there are several hayfields contributing to the local economy, but they are diminishing as more and more of them are restored to wetlands.

=== Mining and quarrying ===
Novato's history of mines and quarries goes back to 1863, when all of a sudden, multiple mining claims popped up in the area. At this time, most of the mines were either gold, silver, or copper mines. Initial results seemed promising, but eventually, prospects shifted elsewhere. Instead of mining for silver or gold, Novato's quarries and mines turned to Mount Burdell. Mount Burdell ended up being the source of hundreds of thousands of hand-cut andesite paving blocks, that were used as ballast in ships and street construction as far away as in Europe. Many of San Francisco's foundations and retaining walls from before the 1906 earthquake also came from Mount Burdell. Novato's largest quarry, the Burdell quarry, produced upwards of 2000–4000 tons of stone daily. Even with such high production, the quarrying activity in Novato slowly waned until the last quarry, located on the west side of Mount Burdell, shut down in the 1990s.

=== Top employers ===
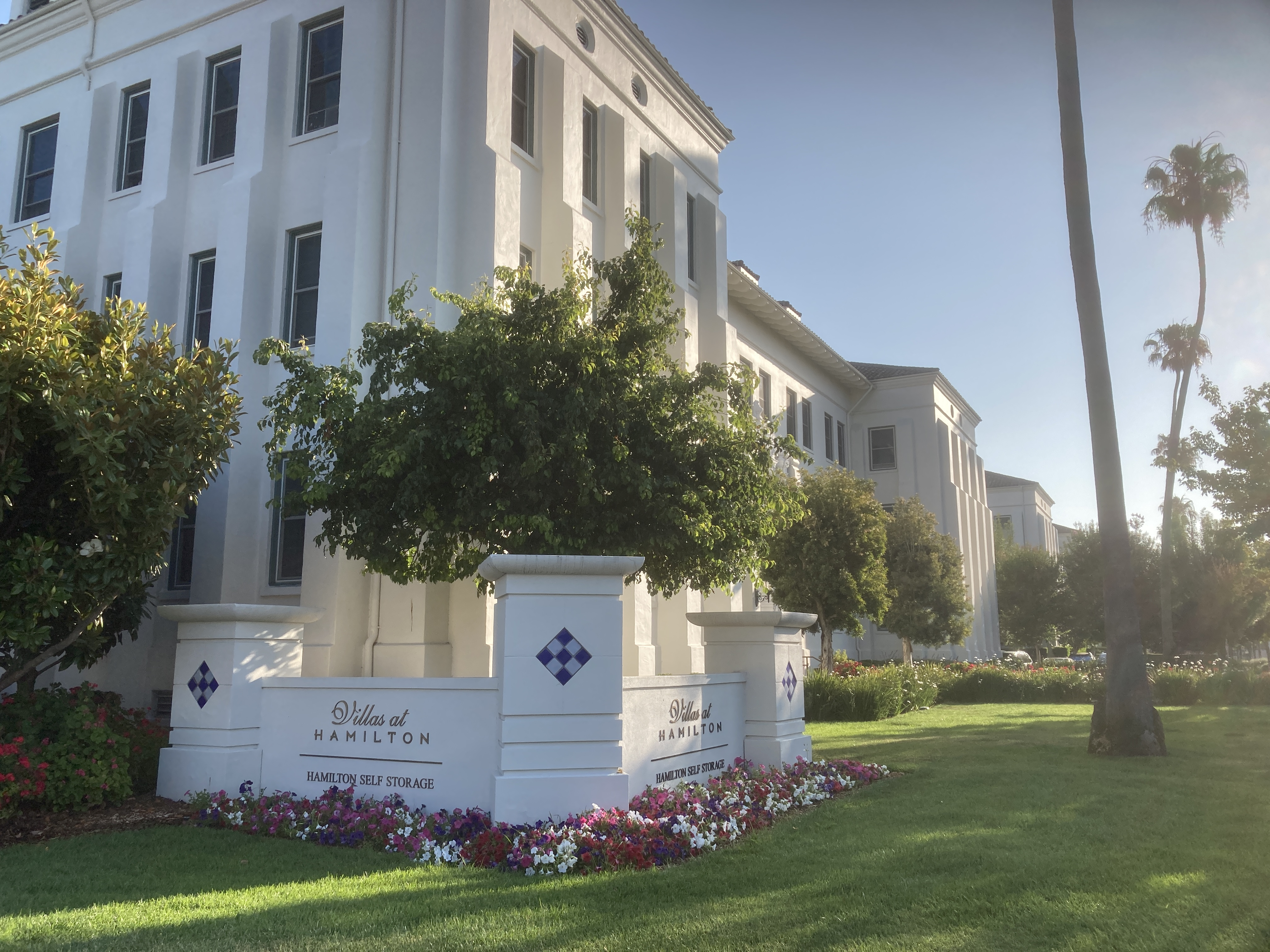
The Villas at Hamilton

As of 2018–19 the city's principal employers were:

#	Employer	# of employees	% of total city employed
1	BioMarin Pharmaceutical	1,005	3.56%
2	Novato Unified School District	803	2.85%
3	2K/Visual Concepts	660	2.34%
4	Bradley Electric	342	1.21%
5	Costco Wholesale	316	1.12%
6	Novato Community Hospital	304	1.08%
7	City of Novato	290	1.03%
8	Ultragenyx	275	0.98%
9	Safeway Stores	250	0.89%
10	Novato Healthcare Center	233	0.83%

== Recreation ==
Novato is a destination for outdoor enthusiasts, with its many parks and open space preserves providing ample hiking trails, biking trails, picnic spots, and playgrounds. Parks and open space preserves featuring hiking trails include:

- Rush Creek Open Space Preserve
- Mount Burdell Open Space Preserve
- Indian Valley Open Space Preserve
- Olompali State Historic Park
- Stafford Lake County Park
- Deer Island
- Little Mountain
- Verissimo Hills

Buck Gulch Falls (also known as the Fairway Waterfall) is located in the Ignacio Valley Preserve, and can be accessed from the trailhead at the end of Fairway Drive. There is also a waterfall in the Indian Valley Open Space Preserve, along the Ken Harth Waterfall Trail, and another in the Pacheco Valle Preserve, at the end of Pacheco Creek Drive. These waterfalls are seasonal, flowing in winter and spring, but slowing to a trickle or drying up completely in the summer and fall.

Popular parks featuring playgrounds in Novato include Miwok Park, Josef Hoog Park, South Hamilton Park, and Pioneer Park. The playground at Pioneer Park was rebuilt in 2023 and is the first fully accessible and inclusive playground in Marin County.

Scottsdale Pond is a small pond suitable for fishing. The pathway around the pond displays signs created by artist Emma Oyle that highlight the wildlife seen in the area.

Novato operates the Hamilton Community Pool, open seasonally.

The Stafford Lake Bike Park at Stafford Lake County Park offers 17 acres of terrain for bikers of all skill levels.

Little Mountain is 214 acres of open space located in Western Novato.

== Culture ==
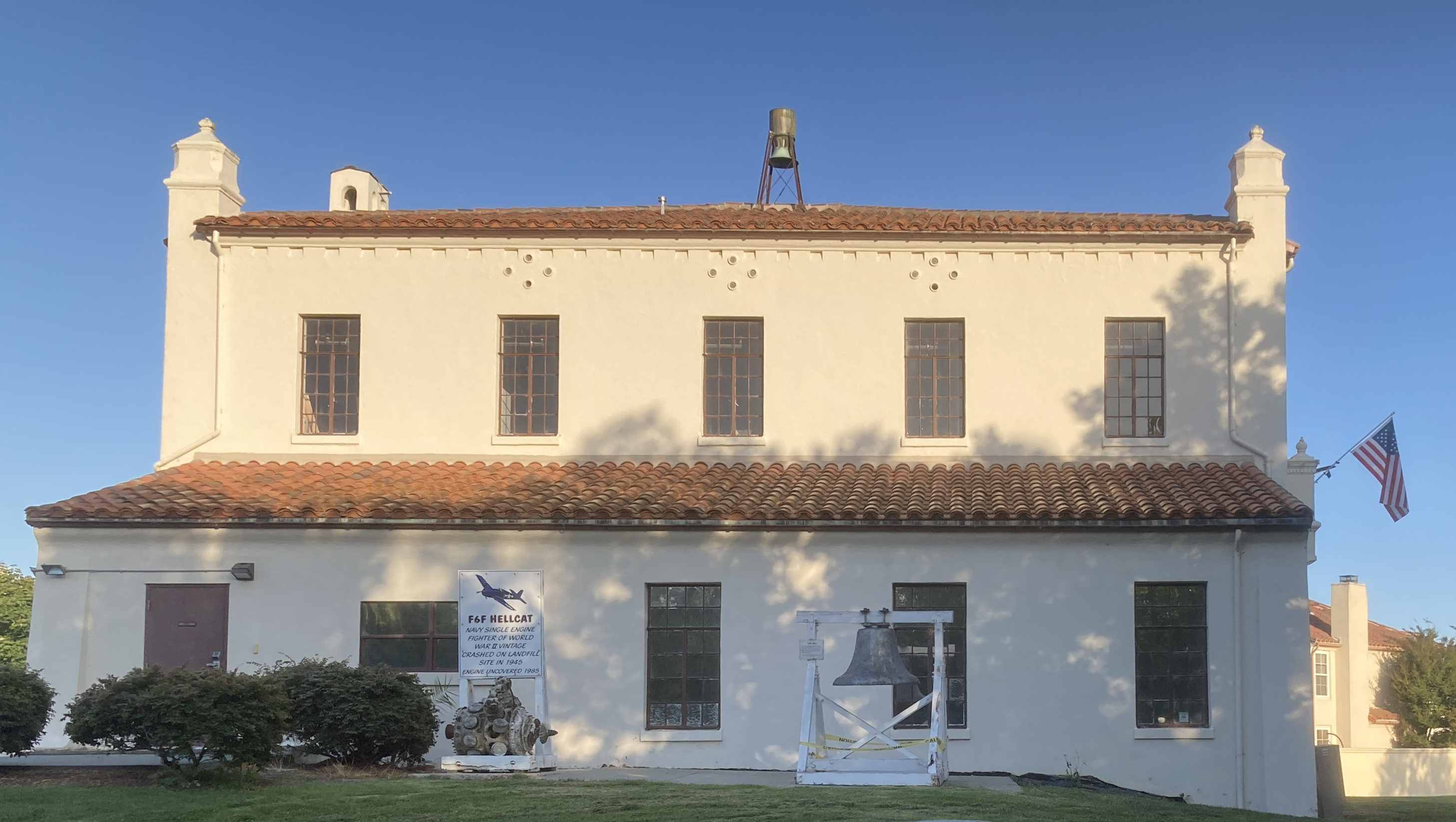
Hamilton Field History Museum

Prominent museums in Novato include:

- Marin Museum of the American Indian
- Marin Museum of Contemporary Art
- Hamilton Field Aviation Museum
- Olompali State Historic Park
- Novato History Museum
- The Space Station Museum (Closed)

In the summer, Novato's Parks and Recreation Department hosts a summer concert series, featuring eight free concerts at the Hamilton Amphitheater and the Novato Civic Green. Each June, Novato produces the Novato Art Wine & Music Festival, featuring two music stages, 200 arts and crafts booths, wine and beer booths, and a kids section with games. Other popular Novato events include Rock the Block, a series of concerts on Grant Avenue in the summer, Safe Trick or Treat each Halloween, the annual Christmas Tree Lighting on Sherman Avenue, and the annual Bouncy Ball New Year on Machin Avenue, where 24,000 bouncy balls are dropped from a fire engine ladder for children to catch.

Every year in the month of May around Memorial Day, the Marin Greek Festival is held at the Greek Orthodox Church in Ignacio Hills of Novato. At this yearly festival, participants can eat, drink, dance, shop, observe and appreciate Greek culture. The award-winning Minoan Dancers are also known to make appearances and display their skills to the present audience.

Novato was home to the now closed Space Station Museum which ran from October 7, 2011 until 2020. During the years of activity, the museum held yearly Space Festivals with numeral guests, organizations, speakers, displays, and more. Past guest speakers include Apollo 12 astronaut Richard F. Gordon Jr., Apollo 15 Command Module Pilot Alfred Worden, Apollo 16 Moonwalker Charles Duke, Aerospace Surgeon Yvonne Cagle, several Space Shuttle astronauts including Daniel W. Bursch, Steven Smith, Millie Hughes-Fulford, Rhea Seddon, Robert Lee Gibson, Jerry Ross, Gregory Harold Johnson.

== Education ==
Novato is served by the Novato Unified School District. The public high schools are Novato High School and San Marin High School. These schools offer two specialized programs. Students from Marin County and surrounding counties may apply for acceptance to the Marin School of the Arts, on the Novato High School campus, or STEM Marin, on the San Marin High School campus. Novato Charter School is a charter school in Novato. Novato is also home to the Indian Valley Campus of College of Marin.

== Transportation ==
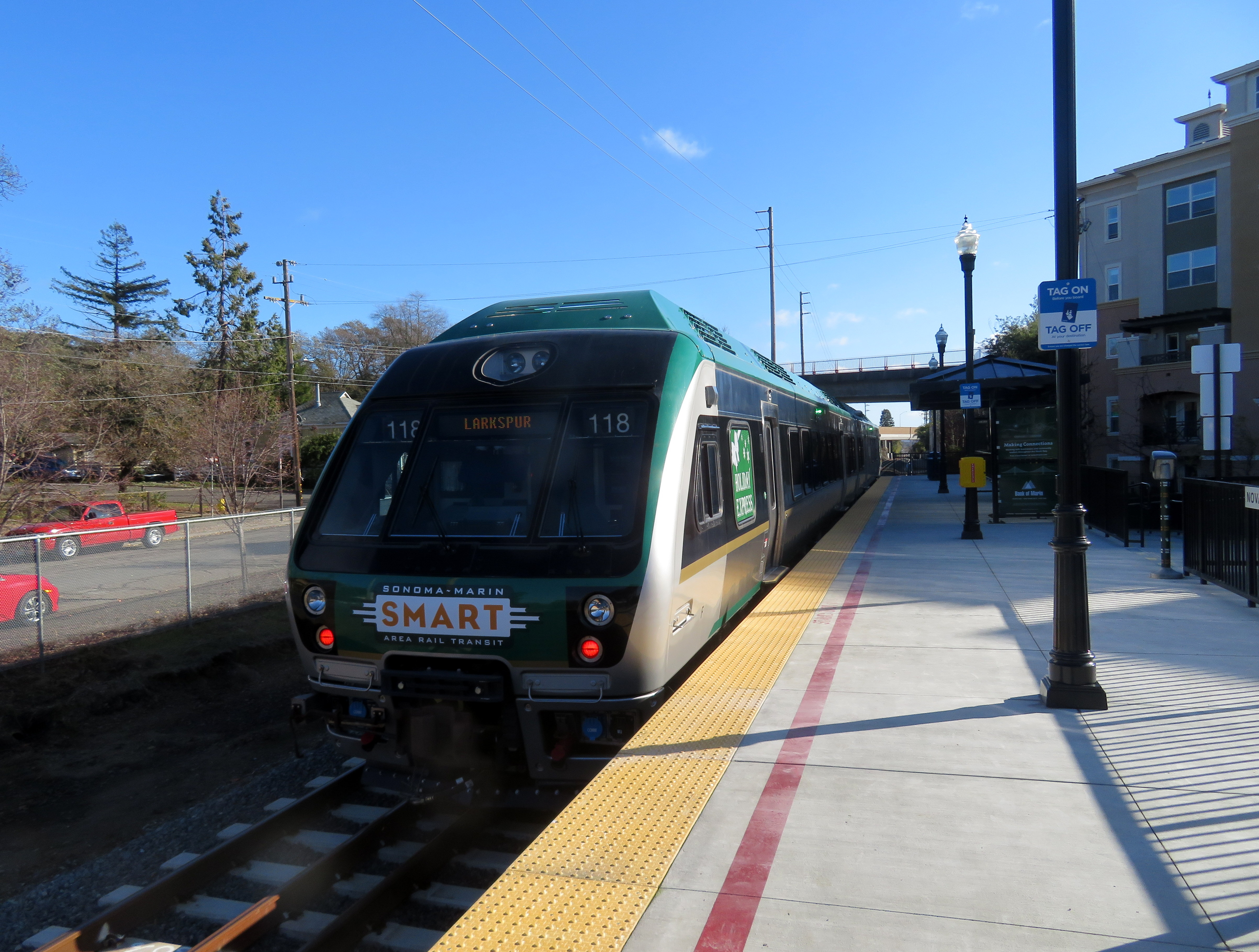
Novato Downtown station is served by Sonoma–Marin Area Rail Transit.

Major highways in Novato include U.S. Route 101 and California State Route 37, and major roads in Novato include Atherton Avenue, Novato Boulevard, San Marin Drive, and Ignacio Boulevard.

Sonoma–Marin Area Rail Transit (SMART) operates three commuter rail stations in Novato: San Marin / Atherton station, Hamilton station, and Novato Downtown station. Novato is also served by several bus routes of Golden Gate Transit and Marin Transit, with a transit center in the downtown area, which serves 2 Golden Gate Transit routes and 6 Marin Transit routes.

== Notable people ==
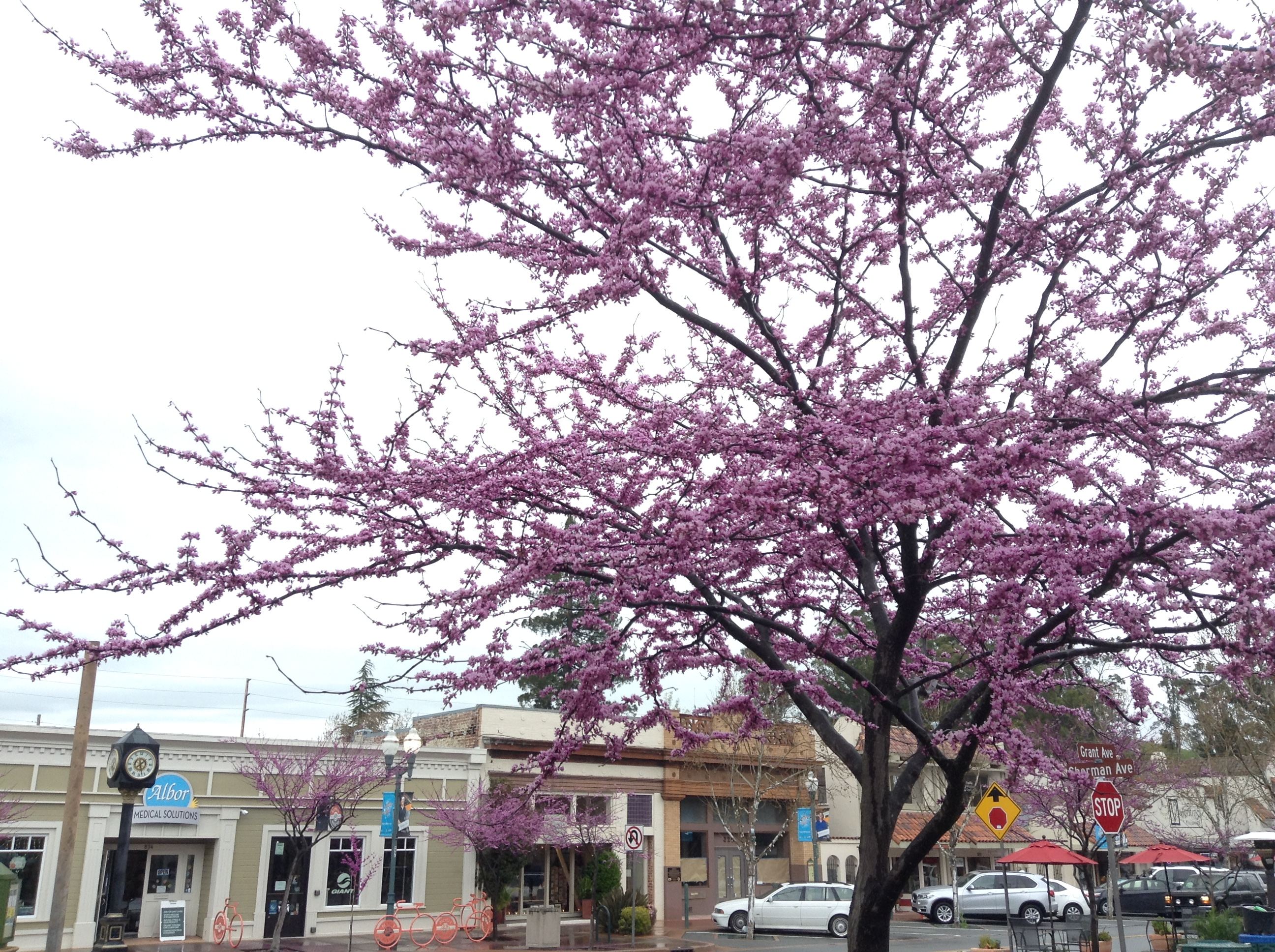
Cherry blossoms bloom on Grant Avenue in Novato.

- Juan Alderete, Grammy Award-winning bassist for Marilyn Manson and former bassist of The Mars Volta and Racer X
- Ralph Barbieri, sports journalist and host of The Razor and Mr. T on KNBR
- Yvonne Cagle, NASA astronaut
- Wil Dasovich, television personality
- Ellen Estes, Olympic Water Polo player
- Jared Goff, NFL quarterback
- Lefty Gomez, pitcher for the New York Yankees and the Washington Senators during the 1930s and 1940s, member of the Baseball Hall of Fame
- Cynthia Harvey, ballet dancer and educator
- Emil Kakkis, President and CEO of Ultragenyx Pharmaceutical Inc.
- Sacheen Littlefeather, activist for Native American civil rights
- Jon Miller, sports broadcaster, most notably with the San Francisco Giants
- Jon Minadeo II, antisemitic conspiracy theorist, founder of the Goyim Defense League
- Brent Moore, former NFL linebacker
- Mike Moroski, former NFL quarterback and current head football coach for The College of Idaho
- Brad Muster, NFL and Stanford University running back
- Bud Norris, MLB pitcher
- Sandy Pearlman, music producer and critic
- Brande Roderick, model and actress
- Nick Rolovich, college football coach
- Joe Rosenthal, photographer of Raising the Flag on Iwo Jima, Pulitzer Prize winner
- Elmo Shropshire, veterinarian and musician known for the Christmas song "Grandma Got Run Over by a Reindeer".
- Rebecca Solnit, author, memoirist, essayist
- Manny Wilkins, NFL quarterback
- Mike Wise, NFL defensive end

== In popular culture ==
- Kane Parsons filmed The Backrooms (Found Footage), later adapted into the movie Backrooms (film), at Novato High School.
- Much of Radio Flyer (1992) was filmed in Novato, where the movie was set. The film starred Elijah Wood (The Lord of the Rings) and was directed by Richard Donner (Lethal Weapon, Superman).
- The Fireman's Fund office complex in Novato was used as a shooting location in Howard the Duck (1986) and Star Trek VI: The Undiscovered Country (1991). The site features in exterior shots for the Khitomer Conference between humans and Klingons.
- Hamilton AFB (closed) was used as the location for filming the lab fire in Emergency! TV movie The Convention.
- The novel The Immortalists by Chloe Benjamin, a New York Times Bestseller published in 2018, is partially set in Novato. One of the main characters, Varya Gold, is a researcher at a renowned aging research institute, modeled on the Buck Institute for Research on Aging in Novato.

== Sister cities ==
- Shepparton, Australia
