= Novato Creek =

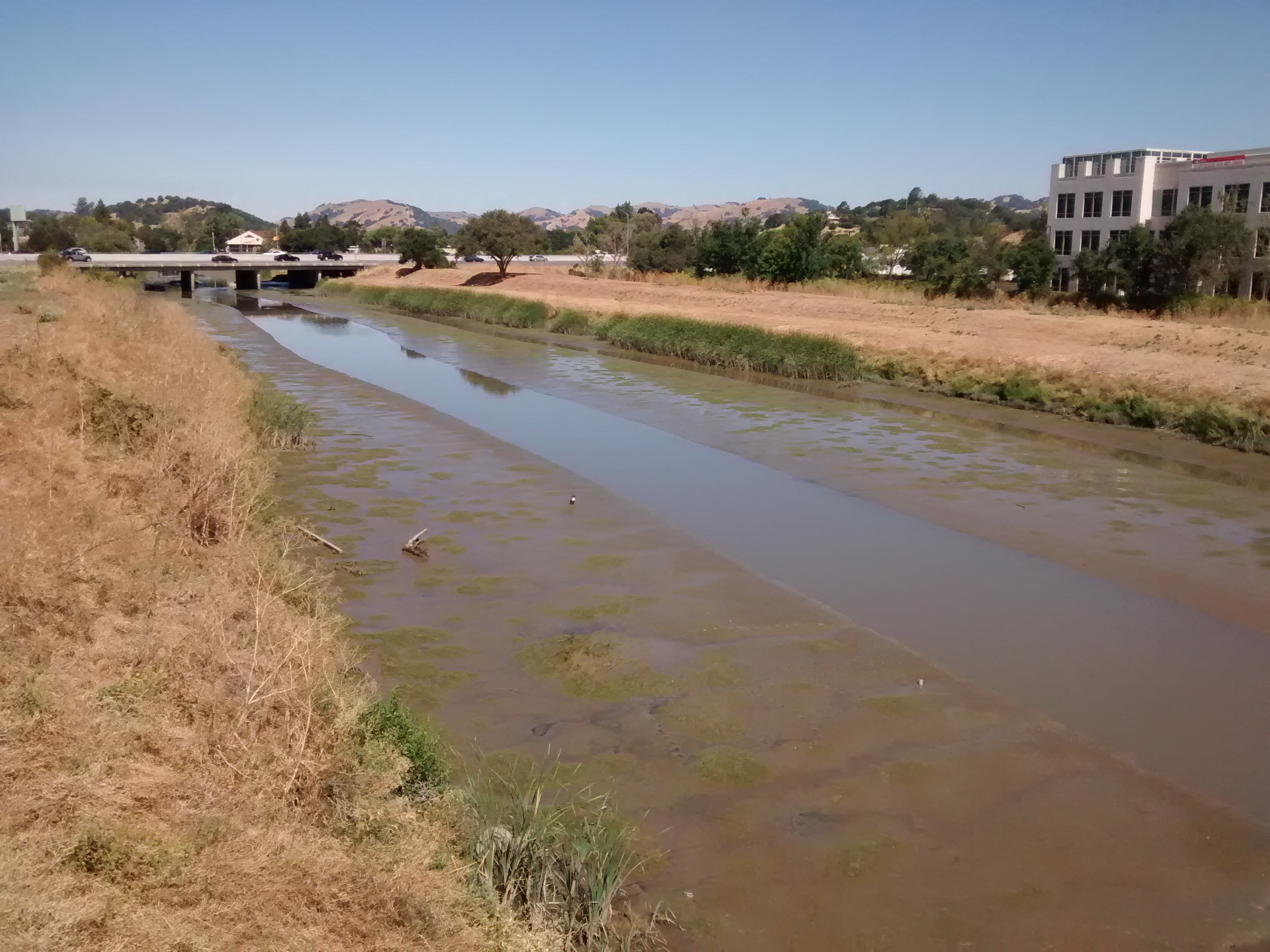
- Novato Creek in summer 2016

- Location of the mouth within California
- Native name: Spanish: Cañada de Novato

Location
- Country: United States
- State: California
- Region: Marin County
- Cities: Novato

Physical characteristics
- Source: Northeastern Marin County
  - location: above Novato, California
  - coordinates: 38°8′36″N 122°38′33″W
  - elevation: 1,100 ft (340 m)
- Mouth
  - coordinates: 38°5′43″N 122°29′18″W
  - elevation: 0 ft (0 m)
- Discharge
  - location: Novato near Lee Gerner Park
  - average: 0.19 cu ft/s (0.0054 m^{3}/s)
  - minimum: 0.00 cu ft/s (0 m^{3}/s)
  - maximum: 2.50 cu ft/s (0.071 m^{3}/s)

Basin features
- Tributaries
  - left: Bowman Canyon Creek
  - right: Vineyard Creek, Arroyo Avichi, Arroyo San Jose

Novato Creek is a stream in eastern Marin County, California, United States. It originates in highlands between Red Hill and Mount Burdell above the city of Novato, California, and flows 17 miles (27 km) before emptying into San Pablo Bay south of Petaluma Point.

== History ==
Miwok and Pomo people were the earliest residents of the watershed. Olompali, the site of a significant Miwok village, is located at the southern base of Mt. Burdell. In 1839 Mexican land grants established Rancho Novato. Grazing brought a host of invasive annual grassland plants that eventually dominated the deep-rooted native perennial grasses and altered runoff rates.

By 1856 extensive apple orchards occupied the valley floor and many of the creeks had been channelized for irrigation. The tidal marshlands had also been diked and drained for agriculture (primarily oat-hay production) by the middle of the nineteenth century. In the 1880s the creek was dredged to make way for schooners bound for San Francisco.

Novato, one of the four townships in existence when Marin County formed in 1850, was incorporated in 1960. Ground was broken for Hamilton Air Force Base in 1932 and dedicated in 1935 (the base was decommissioned in 1974, and designated as a historic district in 1988).

Land use changes have increased sediment supply and decreased sediment transport, causing the lower reaches of Novato Creek to become shallower. In addition, the construction of Stafford Dam (starting in 1952) increased its drainage area by 5.2 square miles (13 km^{2}).

During the 2022-2023 California floods, Novato creek raised over 5 feet to the top of the protective levees, which were eventually breached by floodwaters. This led to the flooding and temporary shutdown of the Northwestern Pacific right of way and US 101, as well as the flooding of some fields. The breach was fixed around half a year later.

== Watershed and course ==
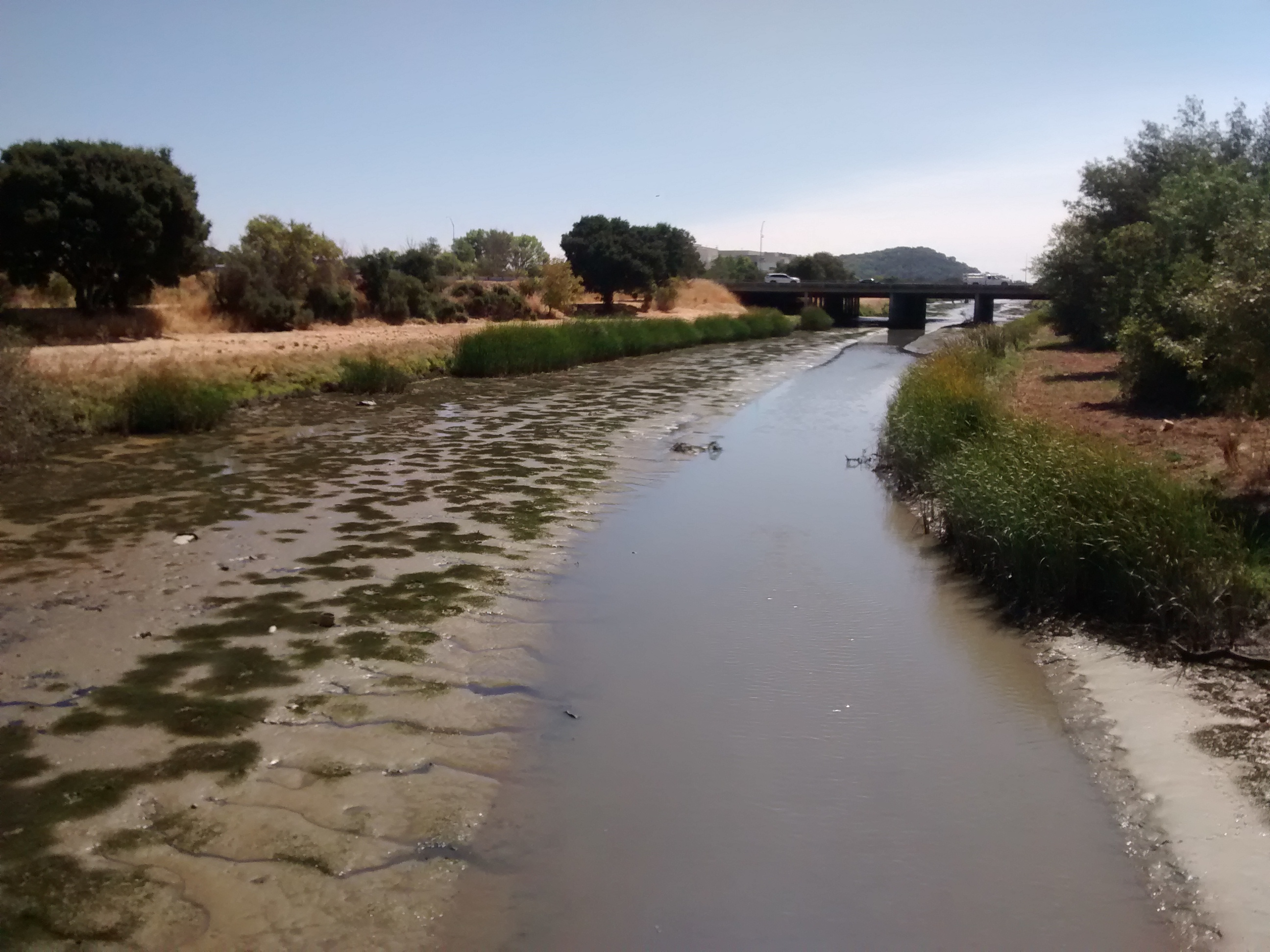
Novato Creek in summer 2016

The Novato Creek watershed basin is 45 square miles (120 km^{2}). Novato Creek is joined (heading downstream) by six major tributaries along its 17-mile (27 km) length: Leveroni, Bowman Canyon, Warner, Vineyard Creek, Arroyo Avichi, Arroyo de San Jose, and Simmonds Slough. Arroyo San Jose itself has two tributaries. It is joined on the left by Ignacio Creek and on the right by Pacheco Creek (at Pacheco Pond) just before entering Novato Creek. Novato Creek and its tributaries are often eroded, incised channels. It is one of the driest watersheds in Marin County.

Novato Creek begins to the west of Mount Burdell and initially descends to the west. However, it soon turns south, then east to feed into Stafford Lake. It descends through the city of Novato. East of Novato it crosses under U.S. Route 101 and State Route 37 before flowing through Bel Marin Keys and entering the northwest corner of San Pablo Bay. For the last 5.7 miles (9.2 km) of its course, Novato creek is protected by levees to prevent it from overflowing its banks.

Just before entering the Bay, Novato Creek flows along Bel Marin Keys, a community on the creek and a series of adjacent lagoons, at an elevation of 10 feet (3.0 m) above sea level.

== Ecology ==
Salmonids (steelhead trout (Oncorhynchus mykiss) and Chinook salmon (Oncorhynchus tshawytscha)) are also found within the Novato Creek watershed. The Novato Creek watershed is known to support 10 extant fish species (6 native and 4 introduced). Native species include California roach, Sacramento pikeminnow, Sacramento sucker, steelhead, threespine stickleback, and Prickly sculpin. Introduced species include rainwater killifish, western mosquitofish, striped bass, and green sunfish. Fawcett (2000 and 2006) also noted the presence of non-native bluegill, largemouth bass, brown bullhead, chameleon goby, and inland silverside. Historically, the watershed supported native tidewater goby; the last collection occurred in 1945.

Wetland-adapted species occur along Rush Creek and the lower Novato Creek wetlands. Noteworthy species include San Pablo song sparrow, California black rail, saltmarsh common yellowthroat, and California clapper rail. Western pond turtles and naturalized bullfrogs are known to occur in Novato Creek.

== Bridges ==
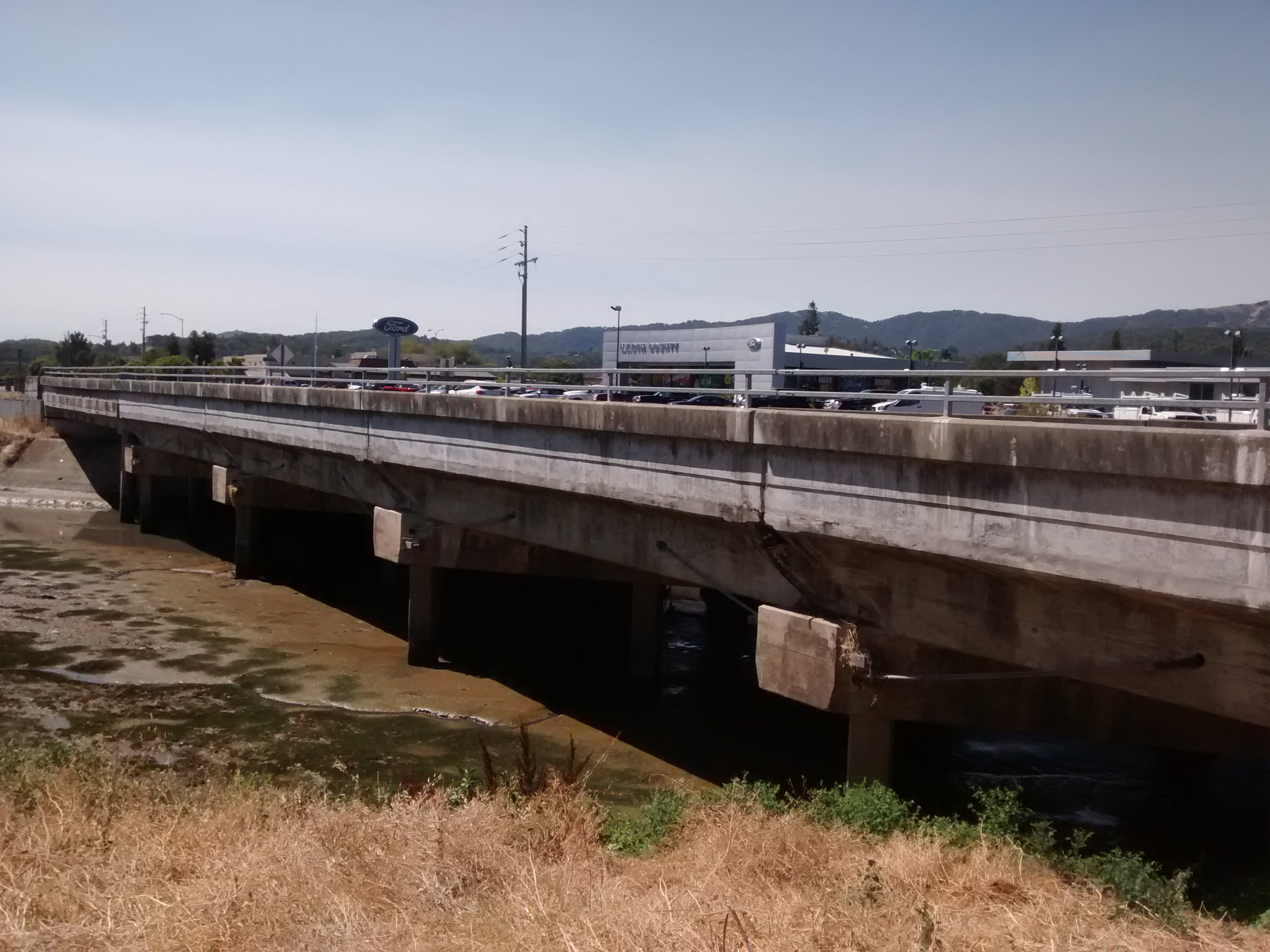
The Redwood Boulevard bridge over Novato Creek

Novato Creek is spanned by many bridges, including:

- at milepost 11.96 of State Route 37, a pair of 720 ft (219 m) prestressed concrete slabs built in 1959
- at milepost 20.51 of U.S. 101, a pair of 192 ft (59 m) concrete continuous tee beams built in 1974
- at Redwood Boulevard in Novato, a pair of 187 ft (57 m) concrete tee beams reconstructed in 1988
- at Novato Boulevard in Novato, a 98 ft (30 m) concrete continuous tee beam built in 1969
- at Seventh Street in Novato, a 60 ft (18 m) concrete continuous slab built in 1971
- at Simmons Avenue in Novato, a 36 ft (11 m) concrete tee beam built in 1932 and reconstructed in 1970
- at Grant Avenue in Novato, a 36 ft (11 m) concrete tee beam built in 1936
- at Sutro Avenue in Novato, a 33 ft (10 m) concrete slab built in 1935 and reconstructed in 1972
- at Diablo Avenue in Novato, a 32 ft (10 m) concrete slab built in 1966

== See also ==
- List of watercourses in the San Francisco Bay Area
