= Deer Island (Marin County) =

Island in California

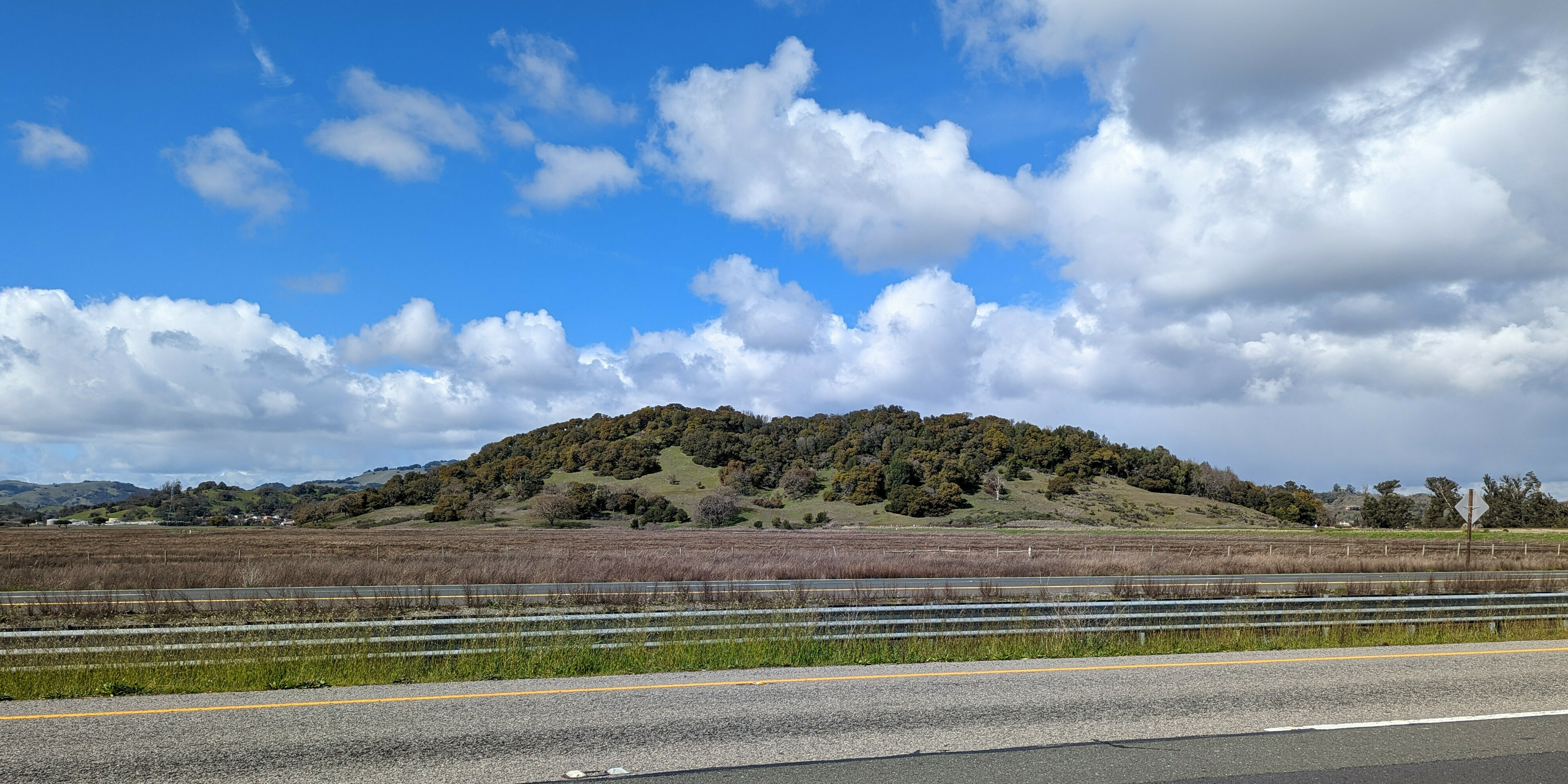
- Deer Island, as viewed from the south in March 2023.

- Location within San Francisco Bay Area Location within California Location within the United States

Geography
- Location: Northern California
- Coordinates: 38°05′52″N 122°32′13″W
- Adjacent to: Novato Creek
- Highest elevation: 167 ft (50.9 m)

Administration
- United States
- State: California
- County: Marin

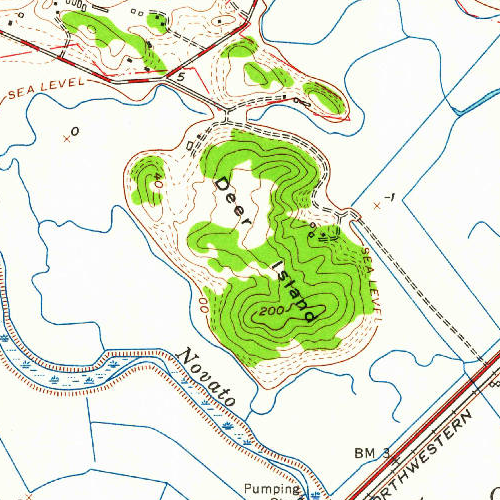
Deer Island in a USGS topographic map from 1954

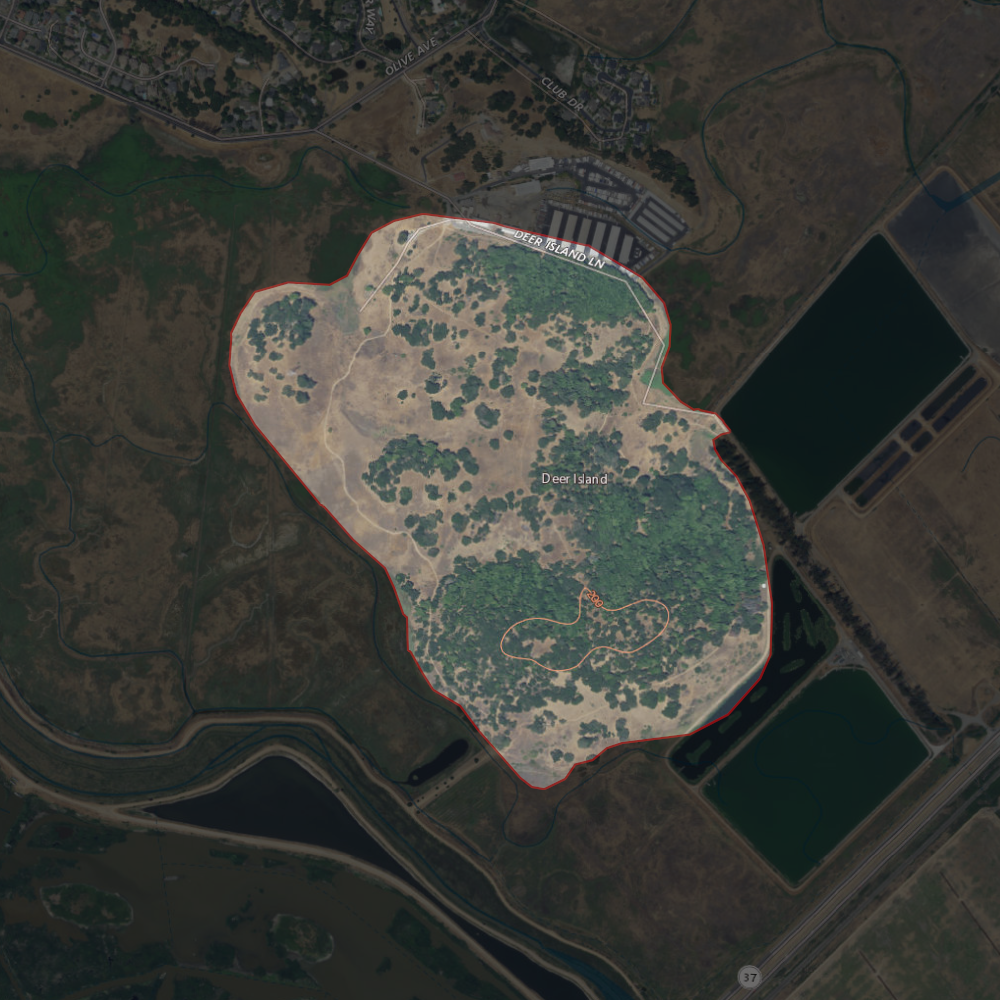
USGS aerial imagery from 2021

Deer Island is a former island in Marin County, California, close to (and formerly surrounded by wetlands of) the Novato Creek, upstream of San Pablo Bay (an embayment of San Francisco Bay). It is now the location of Deer Island Preserve. It used to be inhabited by Antonio DeBorba, who hiked the nearby wetlands to avoid having to use a boat to get home. The building is still there on the Northeastern part of the island. Deer Island's coordinates are 38°05′52″N 122°32′13″W, and its elevation is 167 ft (51 m).
