= Rush Creek (Marin County, California) =

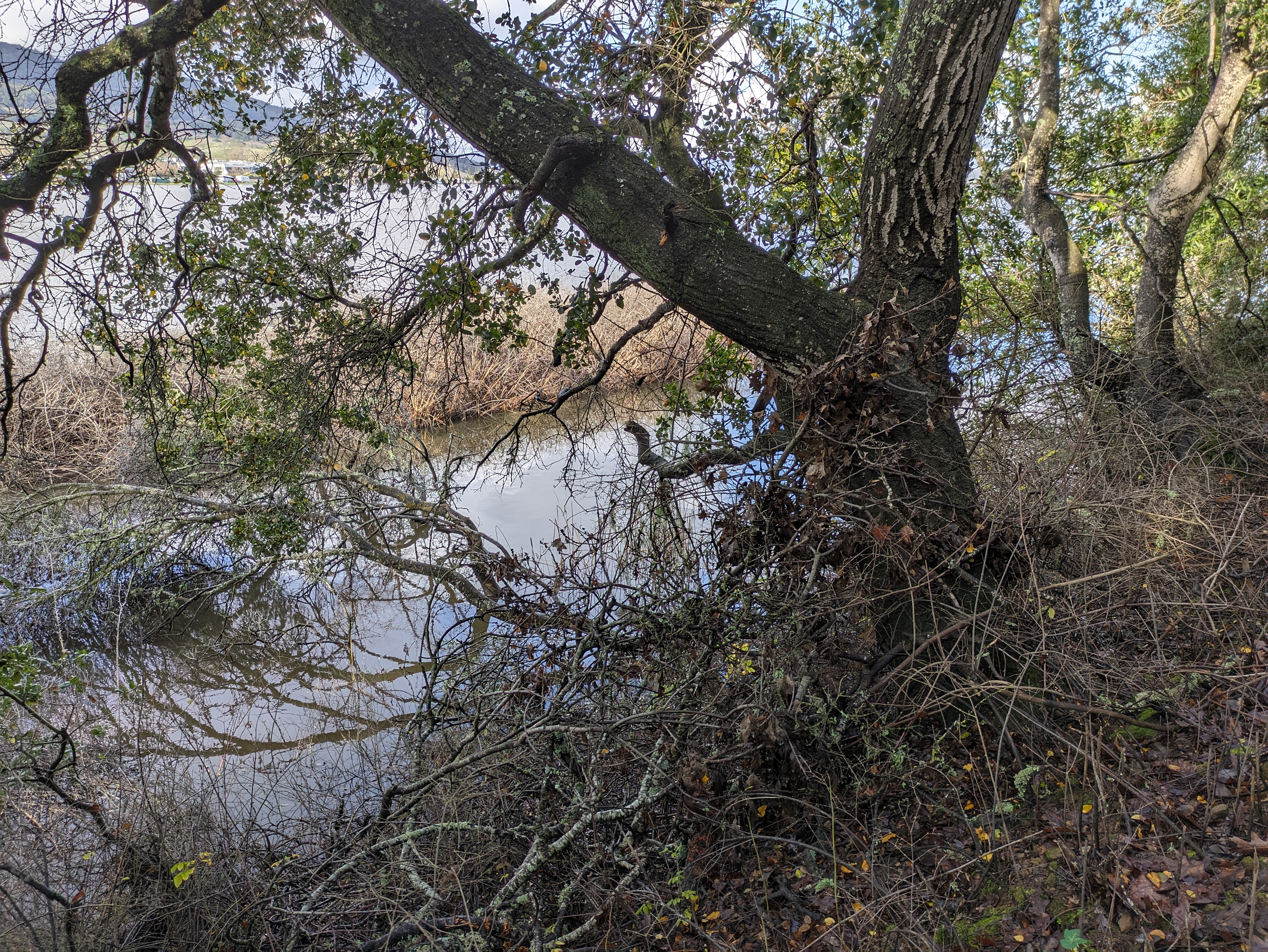

Location
- Country: United States
- State: California
- Region: Marin County
- City: Novato

Physical characteristics
- Source
  - location: above Novato, California
  - coordinates: 38°06′58″N 122°33′53″W
  - elevation: 20 ft (6.1 m)
- Mouth: Black John Slough of the Petaluma River
  - coordinates: 38°08′13″N 122°32′50″W
  - elevation: 0 ft (0 m)

Rush Creek is a stream in eastern Marin County, California, United States. It originates on the north edge of Novato, California and flows 1.5 miles (2.4 km) northeasterly through wetlands into Black John Slough and then the Petaluma River. The name is associated with Peter Rush who bought land near Novato in 1862.

== Ecology ==
The creek flows through coastal saltwater marsh and coastal brackish-water marsh habitats. The wetlands provide suitable habitat for San Pablo song sparrow, California black rail, saltmarsh common yellowthroat, California brackishwater snail, and California clapper rail.

== Conservation ==
In 1999, the Rush Creek/Cemetery Marsh Enhancement Project was completed by the Marin Audubon Society. This project involved the excavation of channels to improve circulation and replacement of tide gates in the 230-acre (0.93 km^{2}) Rush Creek marsh and 50-acre (200,000 m^{2}) Cemetery Marsh. Both marshes are managed by Marin County Open Space District as natural preserves.

== See also ==
- List of watercourses in the San Francisco Bay Area
- Rush Creek Open Space Preserve
