= Rush Creek Open Space Preserve =

Nature reserve in California, US

- Rush Creek Preserve
- IUCN category V (protected landscape/seascape)
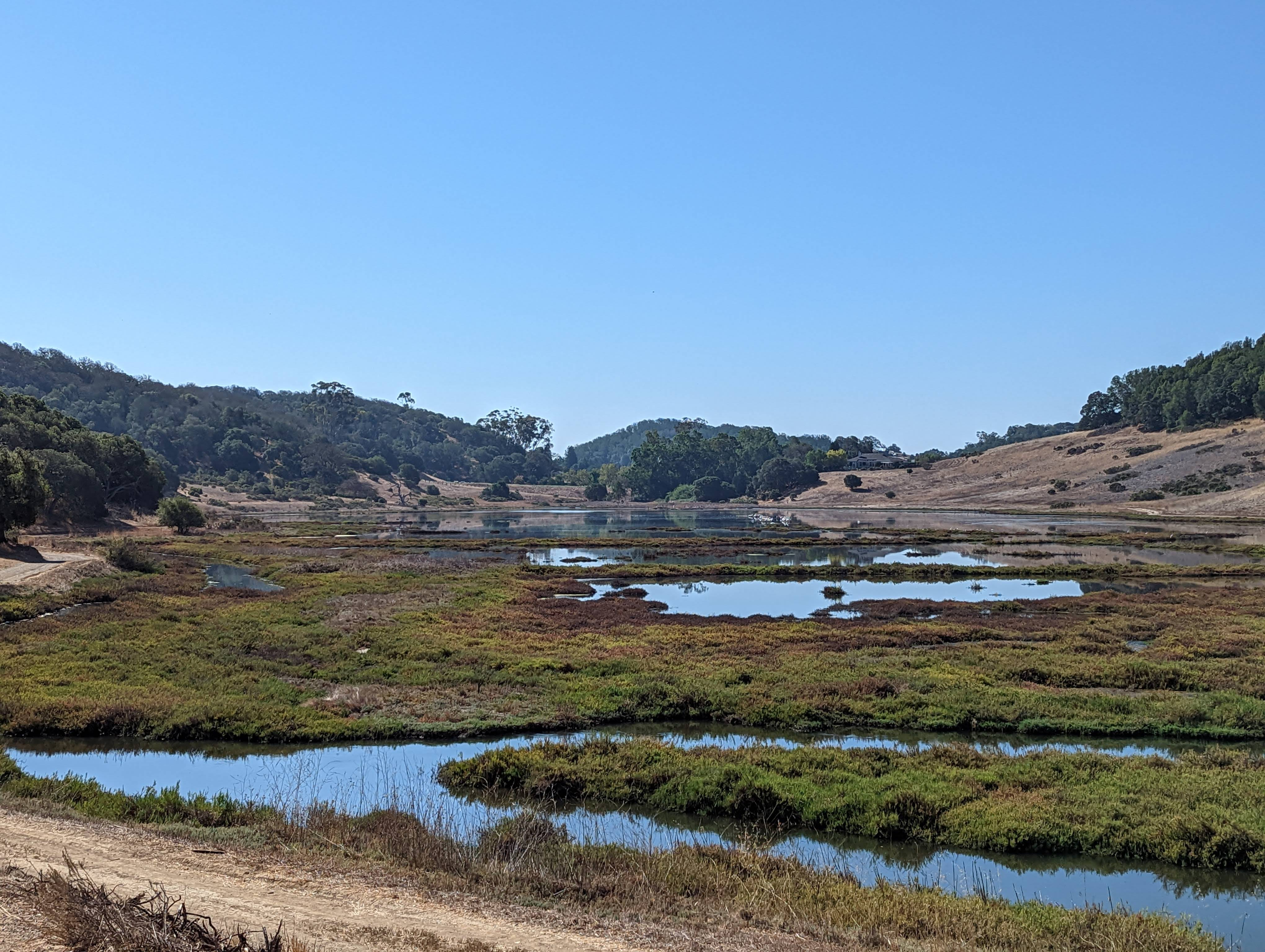
- Cemetery Marsh

- Location within California Location within the United States
- Location: Marin County, California
- Nearest city: Novato, California
- Coordinates: 38°07′44″N 122°32′52″W
- Area: 522 acres (211 ha)

The Rush Creek Open Space Preserve is a nature reserve near Novato, California in Marin County, California. It is named for Rush Creek. The 522-acre (2.11 km^{2}) lot of public land has a host of hiking trails as well as a marsh in the center, and is bordered by various marshes and shallow lakes owned by the California Department of Fish and Game. Due to the proximity of marshes and shallow lakes, a multitude of birds and waterfowl live in the area, with close to 200 species. This makes the preserve a popular destination for birdspotters. The preserve is also popular for running, hiking, biking, dog walking, and horse riding, as all are allowed on most of the trails. A rare blue oak woodland is also located near the Bahia Marsh.

== History ==
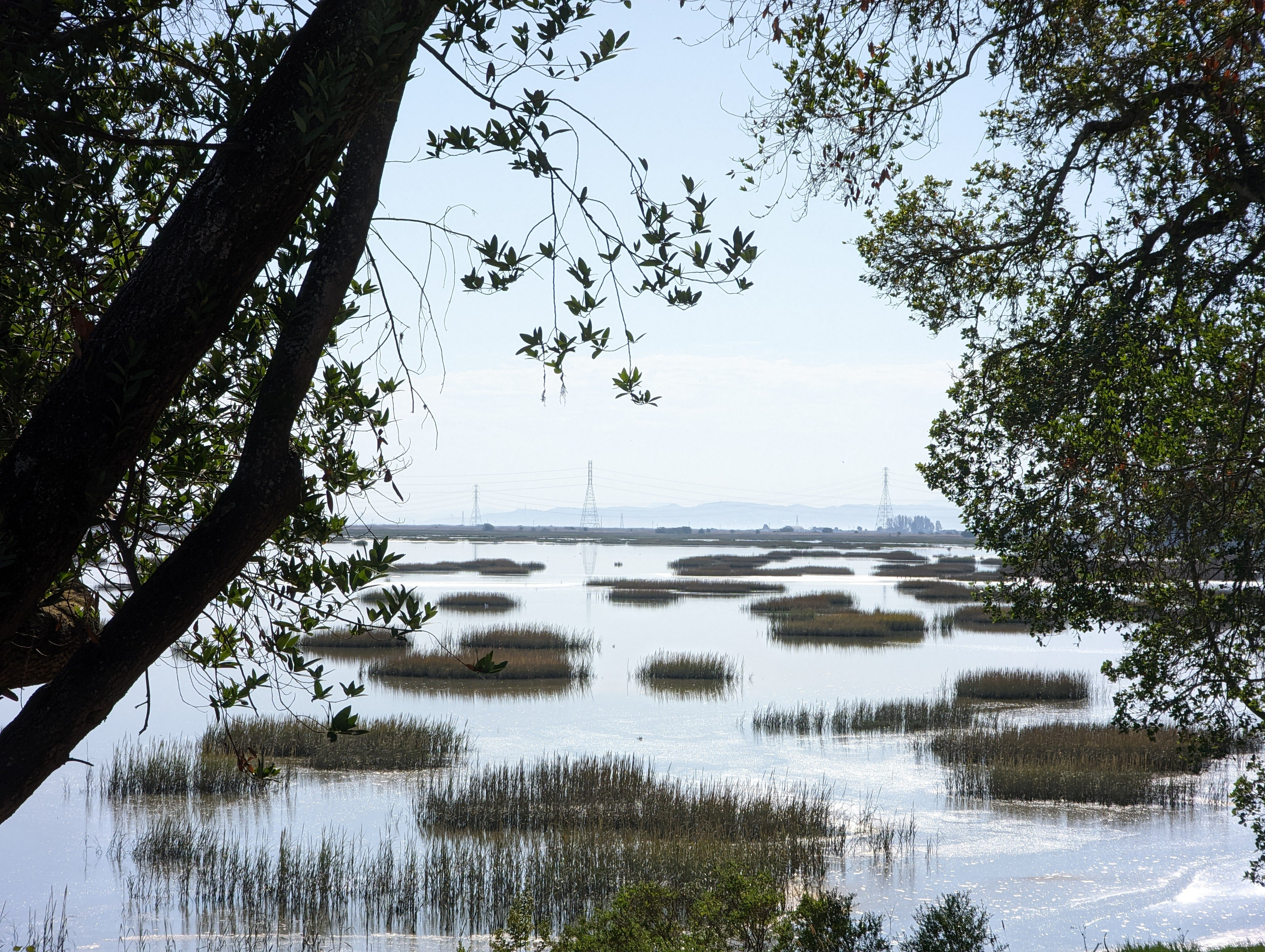
Marshland in the Preserve

Much of the land that is now Rush Creek Preserve was originally owned by an "Anna Rush", for whom the preserve is most likely named. Much later, a 632-acre (2.56 km^{2}) acre lot was purchased by the Marin Audubon Society, who donated most of the land to several government entities, with the majority of it going to the Marin County Open Space District and the California Department of Fish and Wildlife. The Audubon Society still own much of the land around the Bahia Marsh and the preserve.

During the 2011-2017 California drought, Rush Creek's lakes completely dried out; however, they have since returned back to their natural state.

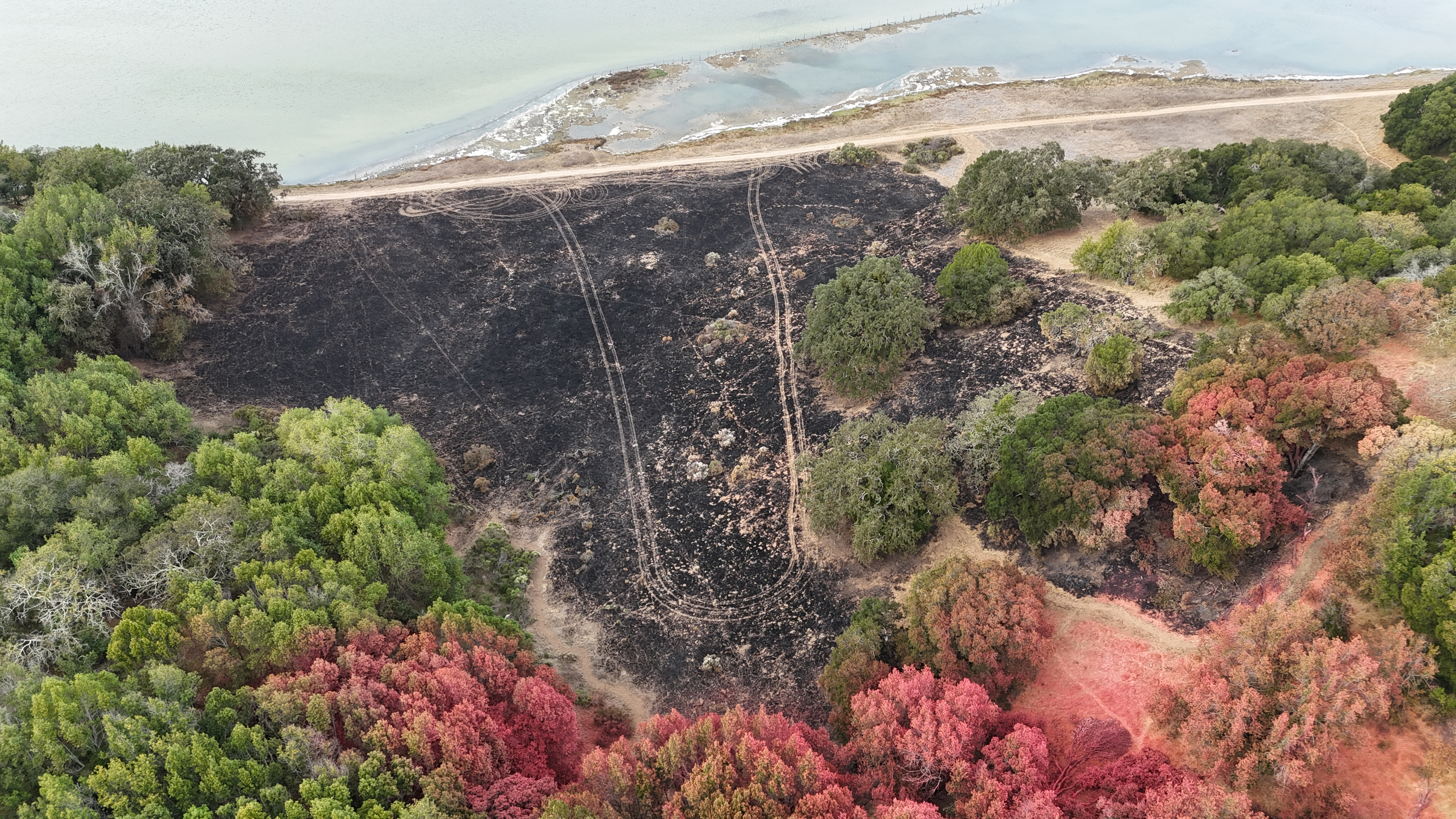
Aftermath of the 2024 Vegetation Fire

== 2024 Fire ==
At 12:45 on October 9, 2024, a vegetation fire was reported in the west of the preserve along Pinheiro Fire Road. It burned 6 acres before being contained later in the afternoon by the Novato Fire Protection District, assisted by various other agencies. It was extinguished by fire crews, with air support out of nearby Gnoss Field.
