= Mount Burdell Open Space Preserve =

Nature reserve in California

Coordinates: 38°08′15″N 122°35′49″W

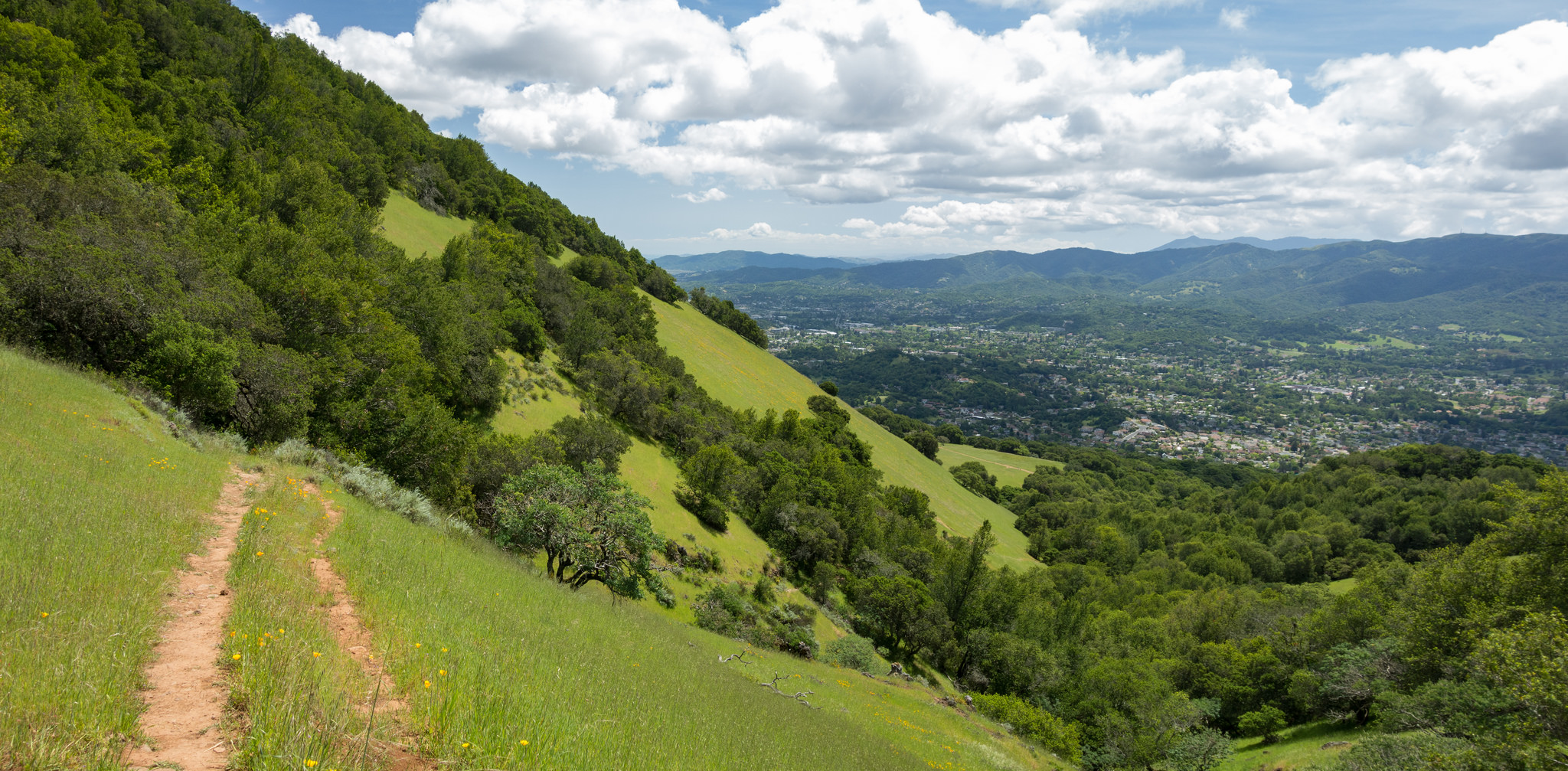
Old Quarry Trail

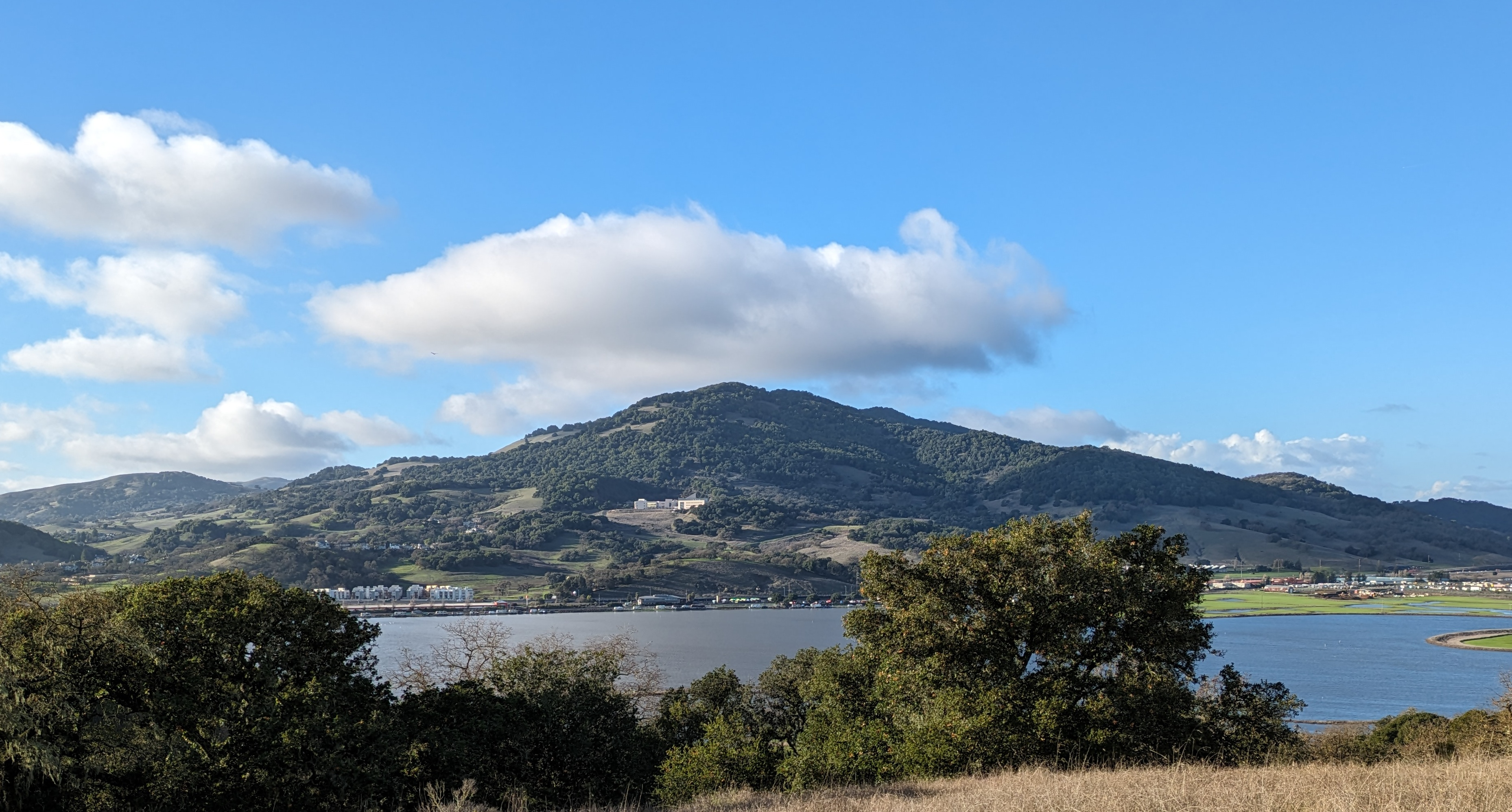
Mount Burdell seen from Rush Creek Open Space Preserve

Mount Burdell Open Space Preserve is a nature reserve in Marin County, California, United States, within the San Francisco Bay Area. It is managed by Marin County Parks. Mount Burdell rises 1,558 feet (475 m) above sea level. Hidden Lake, a seasonal pond located about halfway to the top, is home to frogs, salamanders and other creatures during the wet season. The Marin County Open Space District, with the help of local residents, purchased the 1,627-acre (658 ha) preserve in 1977.

Certain portions of the preserve are grazed by small herds of domestic cattle during spring which helps to reduce all preserved grasses.

== Quarrying ==
Mount Burdell was the location of at least 5 quarries. The largest of them, located at the current location of the Buck Institute, produced andesite paving blocks and materials for highway construction.
