= Knight Island (California) =

Island in California

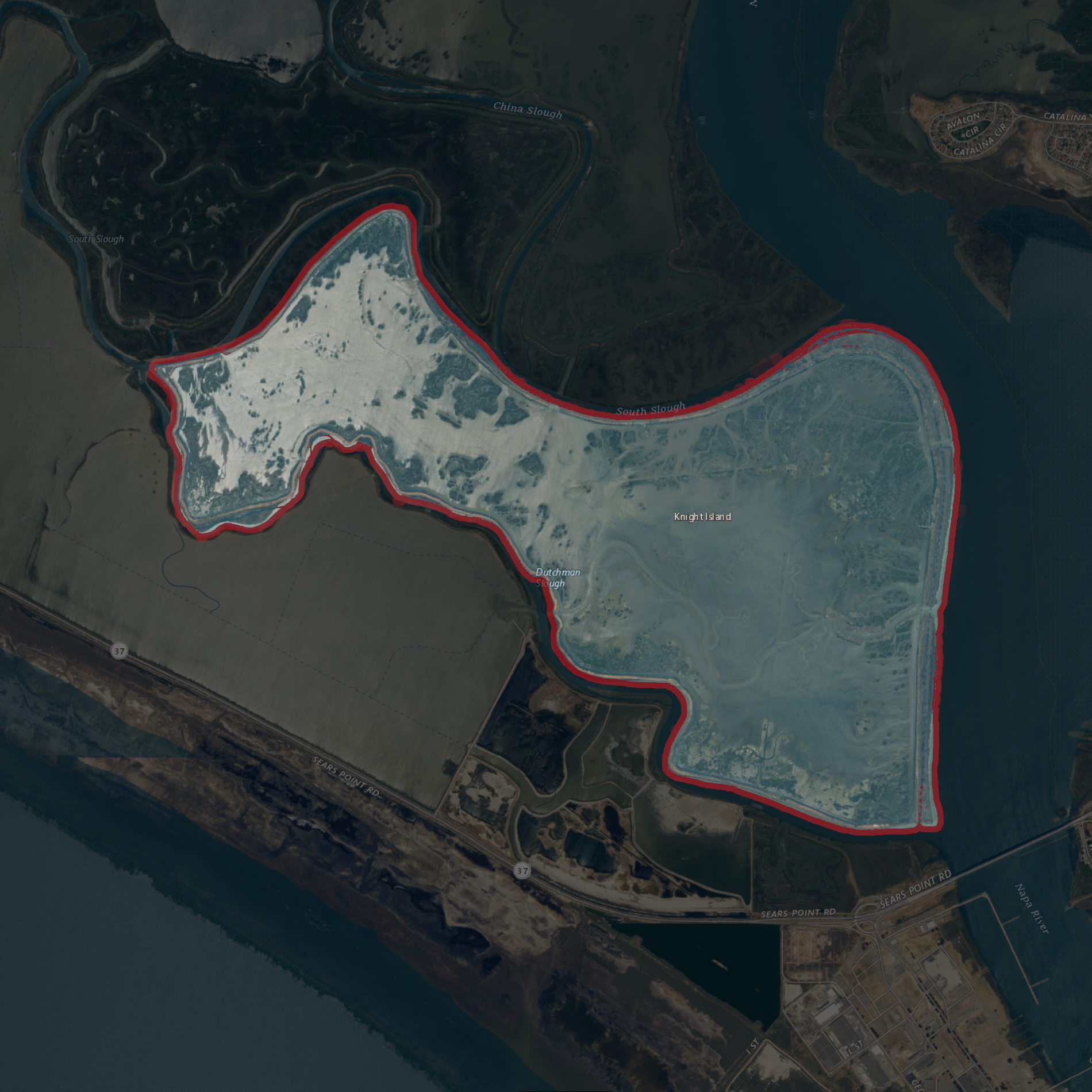
- USGS aerial imagery of Knight Island

- Location within San Francisco Bay Area Location within California Location within the United States

Geography
- Location: Northern California
- Coordinates: 38°08′09″N 122°17′58″W
- Adjacent to: Napa River
- Highest elevation: 3 ft (0.9 m)

Administration
- United States
- State: California
- County: Solano

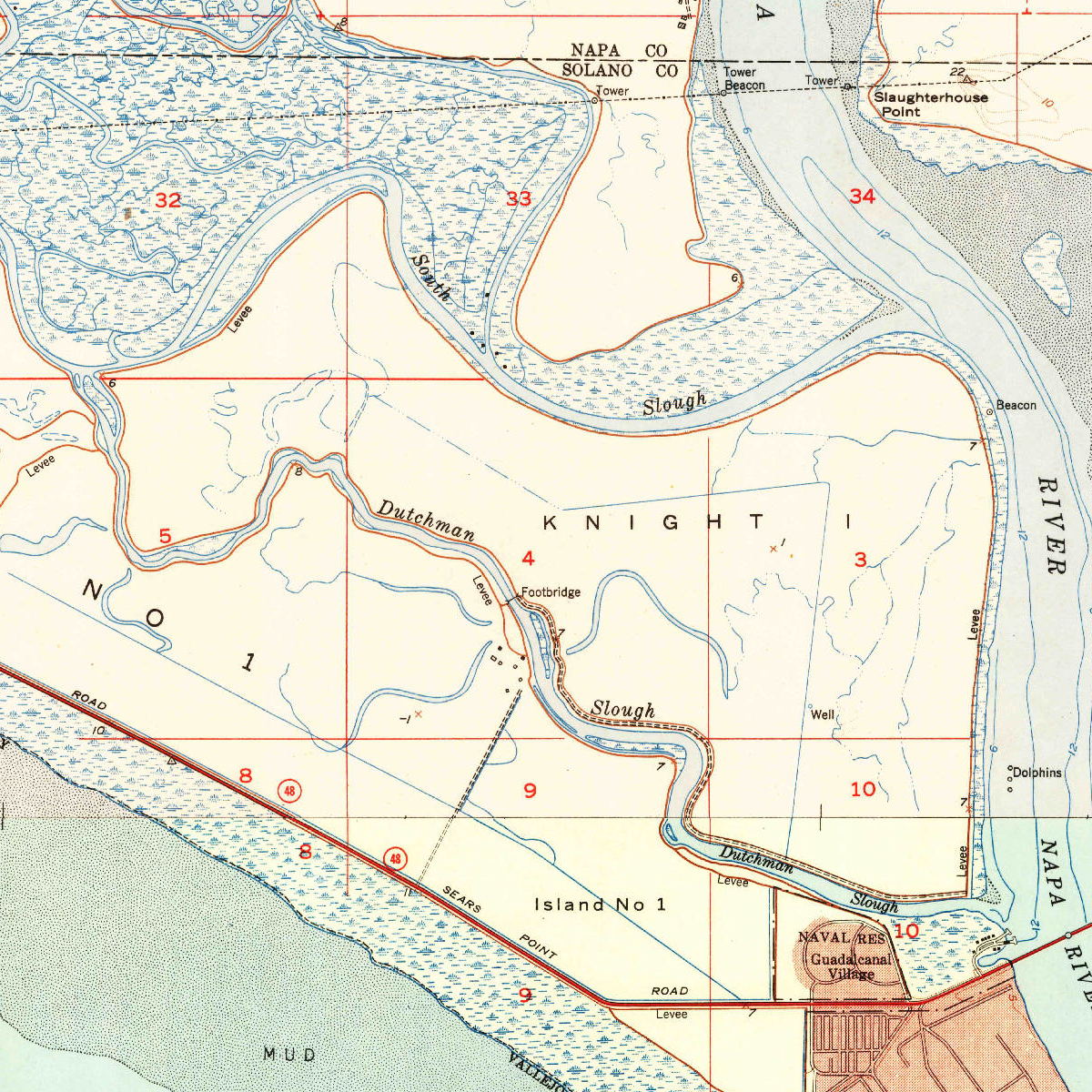
Knight Island as it appears on a 1951 USGS topographic map.

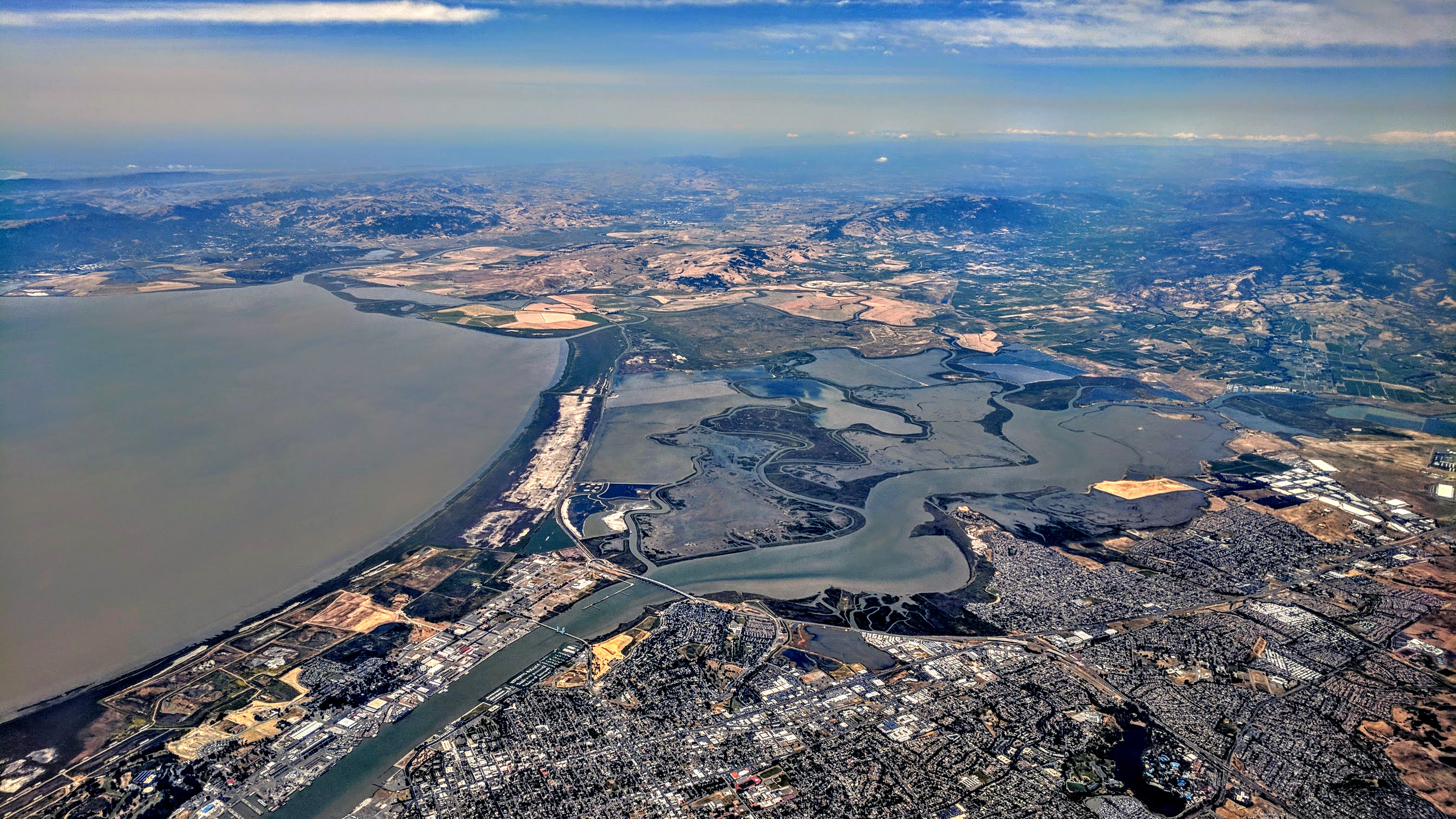
An aerial view, looking toward the west, of the Napa River where it flows into San Pablo Bay through Vallejo. Islands visible include, from bottom of image: Mare, No. 1, Knight, Russ, No. 2, Green, Bull, Edgerly, Coon, Little, and Tubbs.

Knight Island is a mostly-submerged island in the Napa River, upstream of San Pablo Bay (an embayment of San Francisco Bay). It is in Solano County, California, and managed as part of the Napa-Sonoma Marshes Wildlife Area. Its coordinates are 38°08′09″N 122°17′58″W, and the United States Geological Survey measured its elevation as 3 ft (0.91 m) in 1981.
