= Island No. 2 =

Island in California

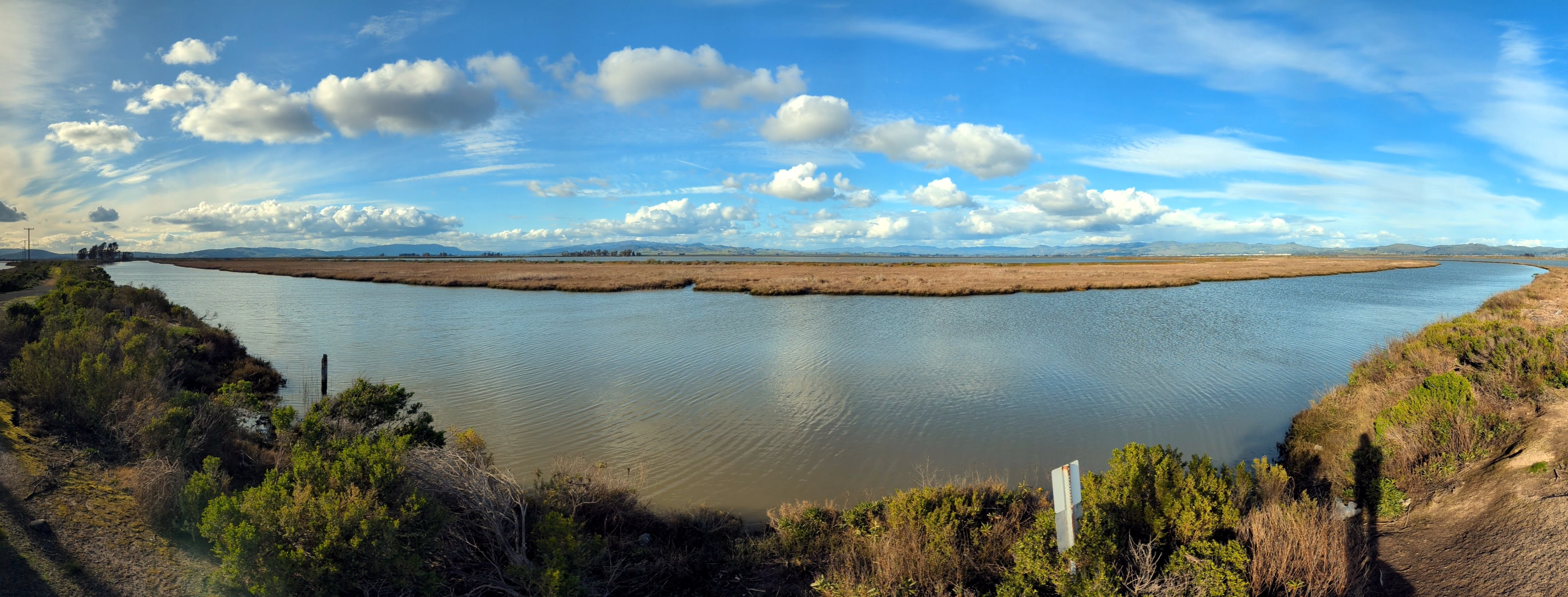
- Panoramic photo of Island No. 2 in March 2023

- Location within San Francisco Bay Area Location within California Location within the United States

Geography
- Location: Northern California
- Coordinates: 38°09′46″N 122°19′56″W
- Adjacent to: Napa River
- Highest elevation: 3 ft (0.9 m)

Administration
- United States
- State: California
- County: Solano

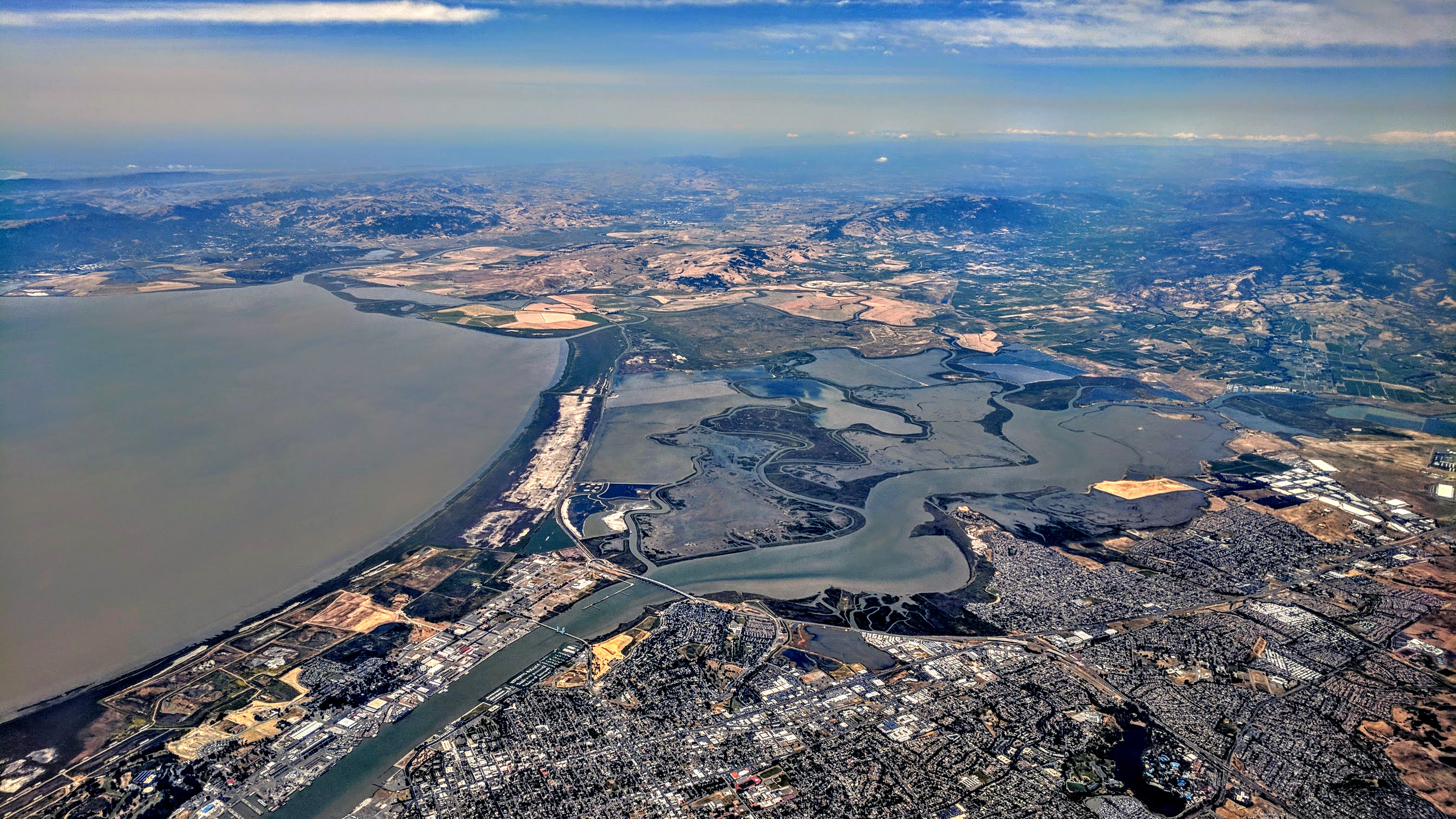
An aerial view, looking toward the west, of the Napa River where it flows into San Pablo Bay through Vallejo. Islands visible include, from bottom of image: Mare, No. 1, Knight, Russ, No. 2, Green, Bull, Edgerly, Coon, Little, and Tubbs.

Island No. 2 is a mostly-submerged island in Solano County, California. Formerly swampland, it was reclaimed into productive farmland, and became the subject of lengthy legal disputes in the early 20th century. Since then, it has become again submerged, and is now part of the Napa-Sonoma Marshes Wildlife Area.

== Geography ==
Island No. 2's coordinates are 38°09′46″N 122°19′56″W, and the United States Geological Survey measured its elevation as 3 ft (1 m) in 1981. As part of the Napa-Sonoma Marshes Wildlife Area (in which it is designated "Napa River Unit Pond 2"), the area is "regularly used by hunters, fishermen, bird watchers, photographers, and hikers".

It is bounded on the north and east by China Slough, and on the south by South Slough. To its northwest is Little Island, to its north and northeast is Russ Island, to its southwest is Knight Island, and to its southeast is Island No. 1. It is contained mostly within Napa County, but its southeastern tip touches the border with Solano County. The entire cluster of islands is west of the Napa River, near where it empties into San Pablo Bay, across which is the city of Vallejo. and east of grasslands and seasonal wetlands on Skaggs Island. To its southeast is Mare Island, and to its southwest (past Island No. 1 and State Route 37) is San Pablo Bay, an embayment of San Francisco Bay.

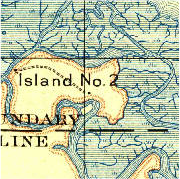
Island No. 2 as it appears on a 1902 USGS map.

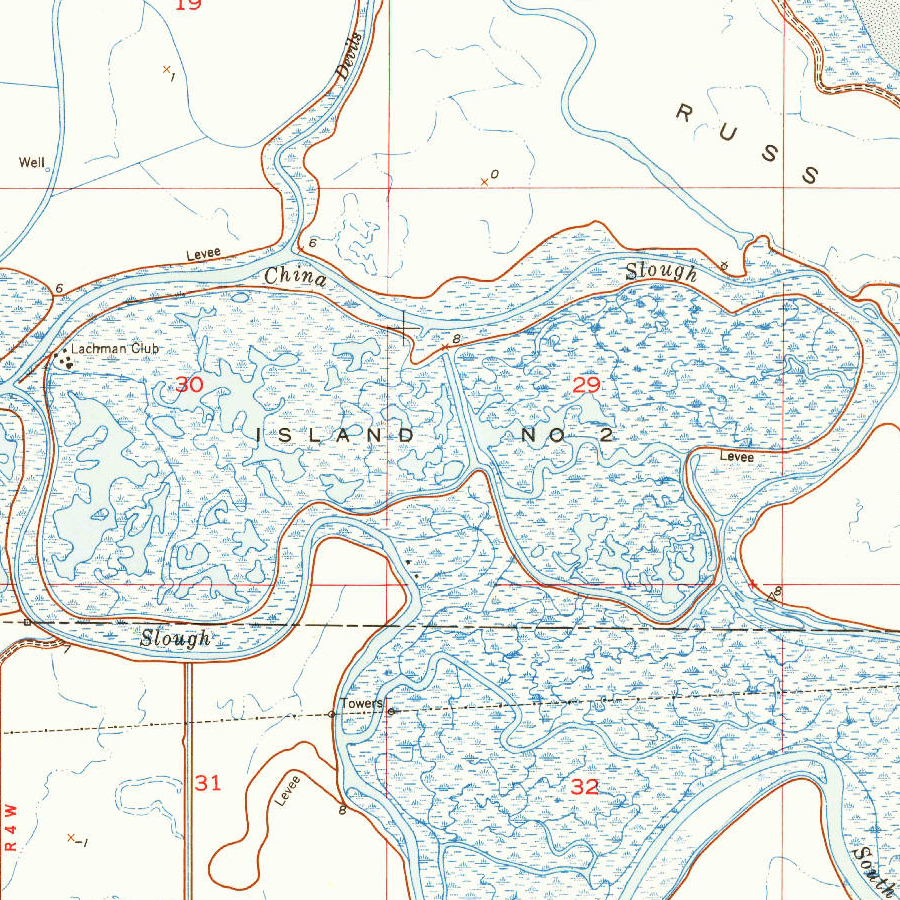
Island No. 2 as it appears on a 1951 USGS map.

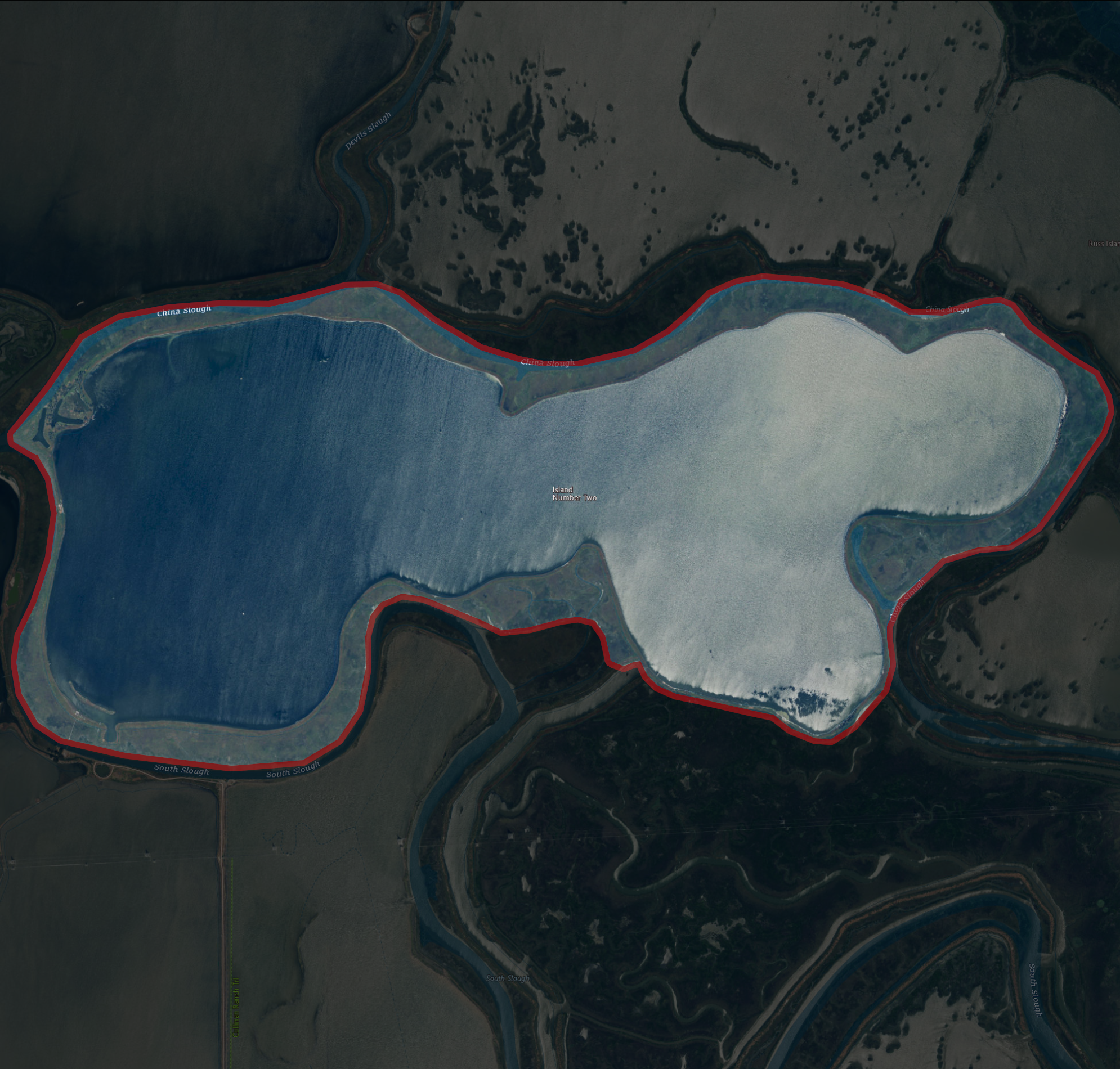
USGS aerial imagery in 2021

== History ==
Many of the islands at the mouth of the Napa River were first discovered by Europeans in an 1823 Spanish expedition led by Francisco Castro. The land became part of the new state of California upon its 1850 statehood, at which time it was used mostly to hunt waterfowl. The northern edge of the island is defined by China Slough, and its bottom edge is defined by South Slough. The area is not charted in surveys of that time, including Cadwalader Ringgold's 1852 map of San Pablo Bay. However, China Slough and South Slough both appear in their current shapes (with South Slough marked as "Navy Yard Slough") on an 1867 survey of the area's waterways.

=== Reclamation ===
This land was reclaimed, and the swamps drained, at some point in the mid-to-late-1800s; Island No. 2 was contained within Survey No. 115. By the end of the 19th century, "most marshland in the [area] was diked, drained, and being used for livestock grazing and farmland". Island No. 2, along with Island No. 1, Green Island and Tubbs Island, are labeled on a 1902 USGS map of the area.

In the early 1900s, Island No. 2 (like the neighboring Island No. 1, also known as "Cross Island") was owned by L.E. Cross. Later, it came into the possession of David T. Hanbury, an "English scion" and millionaire who owned several breweries and wineries in England and California. Hanbury farmed the land, and had "men over on the Island".

On October 21, 1908, the island was deeded to David's wife Marie Eleanor Hanbury, a "former Benicia hello girl". On December 29, in what the Napa Weekly Journal described as "one of the most interesting documents ever placed on record in Napa County", a mortgage on Island No. 2 was executed by Marie "with the utmost secrecy"; David was unable to sign the document "owing to illness". At the time, the 867-acre (351 ha) island had an estimated value between $80,000 and $125,000 ($2.87 million and $4.48 million in 2025). The Weekly Journal hypothesized that the mortgage had been executed in order to pay the Hanburys' debts in Vallejo.

Later, on the morning of January 19, 1909, the Napa County Recorder's office recorded a deed in which David Hanbury sold Island No. 2 to his brother John McKenzie Hanbury, of London, for a sum of $10 ($358.00 in 2025). This deed had been executed in San Francisco on January 8, 1908; it was, however, entered into the county record nearly a month after the transfer of the island to Marie. Around February 1909, David fractured a rib while "endeavoring to get into a bath tub at Island No. 2".

David claimed that the deed transferring the island to his brother "was either obtained from him under the influence of drugs or was a forgery", saying that "it is at least odd that, if it was made more than a year ago, it was not recorded until after the genuine deed to the property which I made to my wife". In February, he and Marie Eleanor left for England; the Napa Journal said that "while it was reported that the trip was made for the benefit of the husband's health, it was believed that the real purpose was to reach an amicable understanding with the brother in Old England". David engaged an attorney, Hiram Johnson, to "establish the validity of [his] wife's deed to the property". On December 4, John's claims to the island were dismissed.

By 1910, divorce proceedings between David T. Hanbury and Marie Eleanor were underway; the Napa Weekly Journal said that during these proceedings "the title to the famous island passed rapidly from Hanbury to his wife, then to his brother John, the English brewer, and again to the Napa Bank, and all around the circle again". By May, they had "[settled] their marital troubles" and gone to live in Santa Cruz. On May 22, 1910, Marie Eleanor gave birth to a son, David Mackenzie Hanbury.

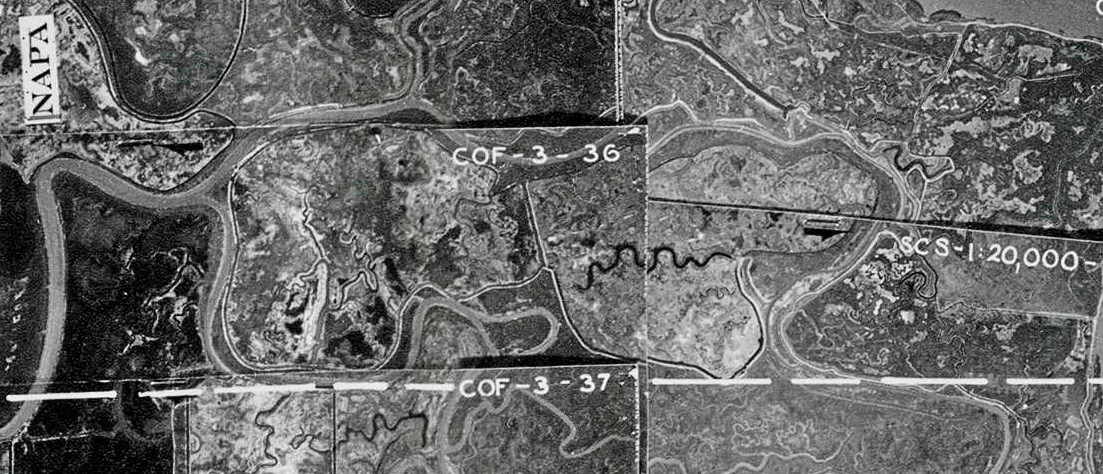
Aerial photo of Island No. 2 in 1942

David T. Hanbury died in October 1910, at the White Sulphur Springs in Solano County, having gone there for treatment of his poor health. In February 1911, his estate was appraised; Island No. 2 was valued at $34,680 ($1.2 million in 2025). In 1914, a Stockton company leased Island No. 2 and planned "extensive cultivation of the area". A December 1915 announcement in the San Francisco Recorder mentioned an "undivided three-fourths interest in all of Island Number Two". In 1916, W. L. Williamson and F. Henritty were arrested on charges of disturbing the peace, after a "quarrel over a lease on Island No. 2".

By 1920, the island was again in legal dispute; David Mackenzie was at that point half owner of the island (held in trust by the Anglo-California Trust Company). William Banta, David Mackenzie's uncle and legal guardian, was sued by the British members of the family for ownership of Island No. 2 and other properties in the estate. The island was put up for public auction in June 1925. In November 1926, some interest in the property was sold from Ellen Weinstein, Estelle Meyer and others to a Z.S. Israelsky. In December 1927, another notice of guardian's sale was issued, again for Island No. 2 being sold by its owner David Mackenzie Hanbury. In February 1928, a transaction was recorded in which the Anglo-California Trust Company sold Island No. 2 to a Nat Boas; on the same day, Nat Boas also acquired Z.S. Israelsky's interest in said property.

In 1927, construction started on a bascule bridge connecting to Island No. 2 from Vallejo; a cofferdam was placed in April, and construction was "nearly finished" by September.

By 1928, there existed a Hanbury Island Gun Club on the island, at which were located a "handsome new club house with 8 bedrooms, a huge club room, kitchen, pantry, showers, lavatories and all other modern conveniences" in addition to "a keeper's cottage, outhouses, blinds, ponds, levees, etc".

While Island No. 2 had been shown as dry land surrounded by levees in 1916 USGS maps, by 1942 it is shown as having significant amounts of marsh and water in its interior. By 1949, its interior is shown as almost entirely marshlands, although the "Lachman Club" remains on its northwest side. This remained the case in 1951, but by 2012 no club is shown, and the island is shown as completely submerged.

In 1994, large tracts of land (including many islands and former islands in the area) were purchased from Cargill by state agencies. Island No. 2 became part of the Napa-Sonoma Marshes Wildlife Area, as a "managed pond" administered by the California Department of Fish and Game. Its restoration was carried out in Phase 2 of the project, completed in 2006. It is currently designated as "Pond 2".
