= Island No. 1 =

Island in California

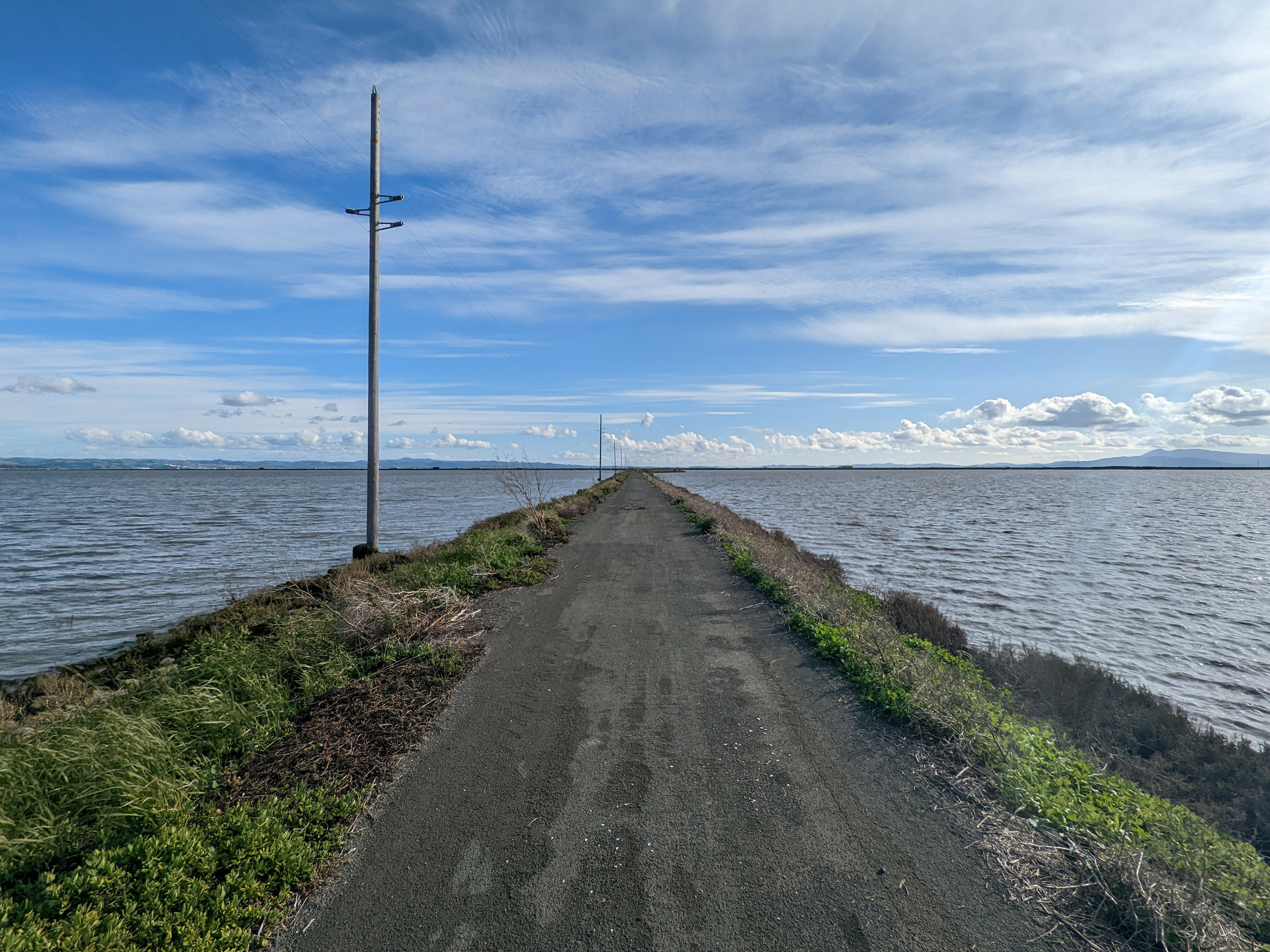
- Island No. 1, submerged in March 2023 (as seen from the northern part of an internal levee, looking south).

- Location within San Francisco Bay Area Location within California Location within the United States

Geography
- Location: Northern California
- Coordinates: 38°08′35″N 122°20′40″W
- Adjacent to: Napa River
- Highest elevation: 3 ft (0.9 m)

Administration
- United States
- State: California
- County: Napa and Solano

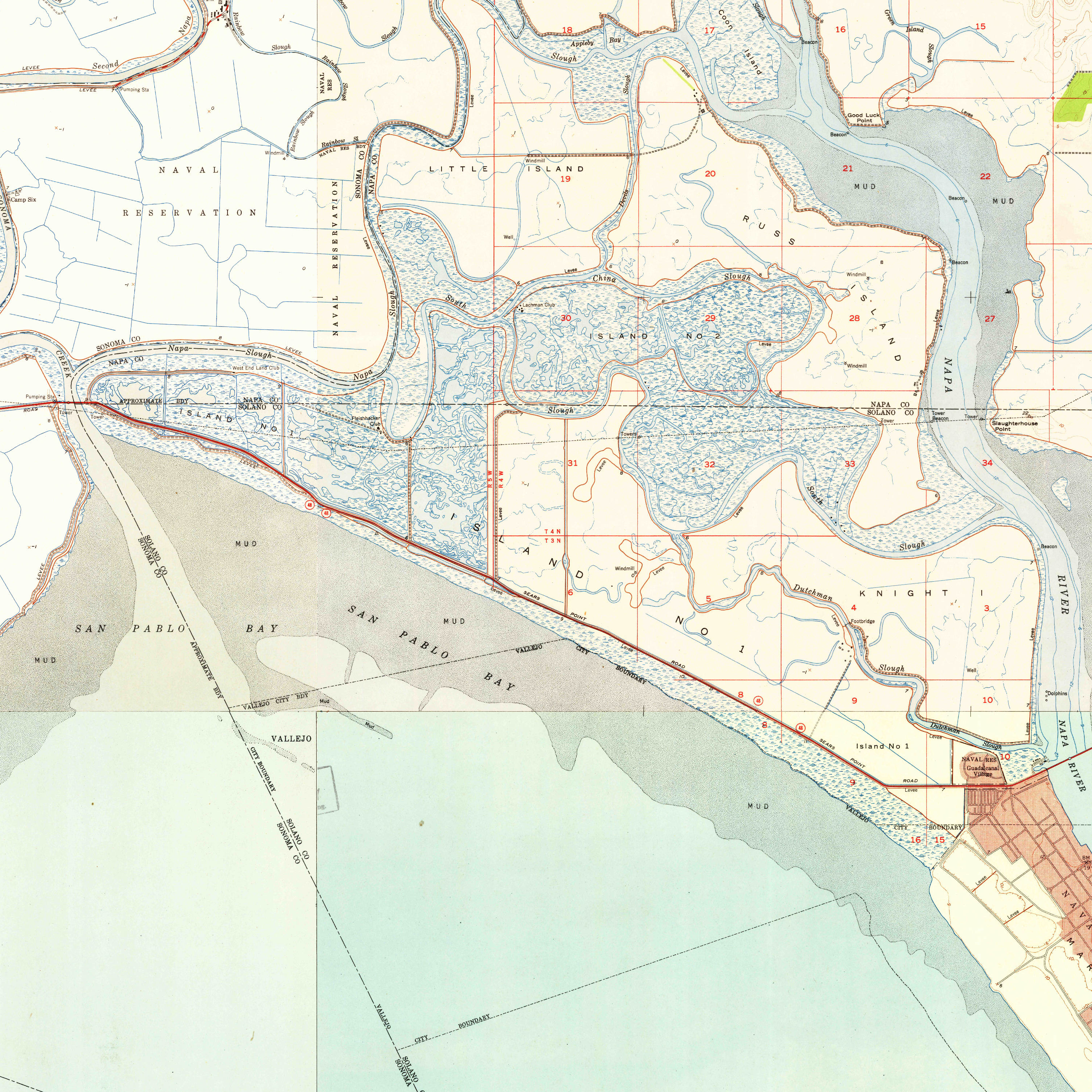
Island No. 1 as it appears on a 1951 USGS topographic map.

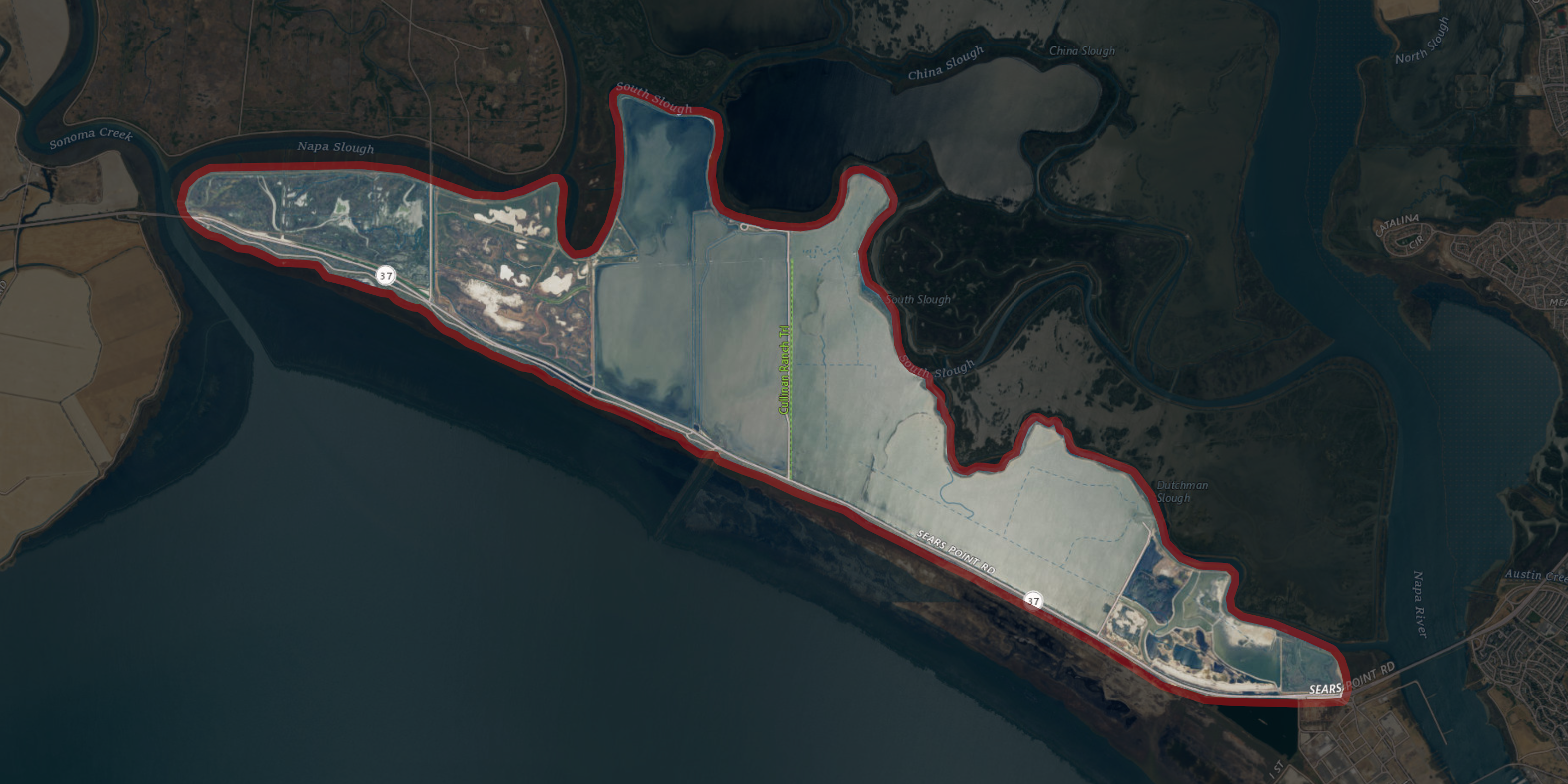
USGS aerial imagery of Island No. 1 in 2021.

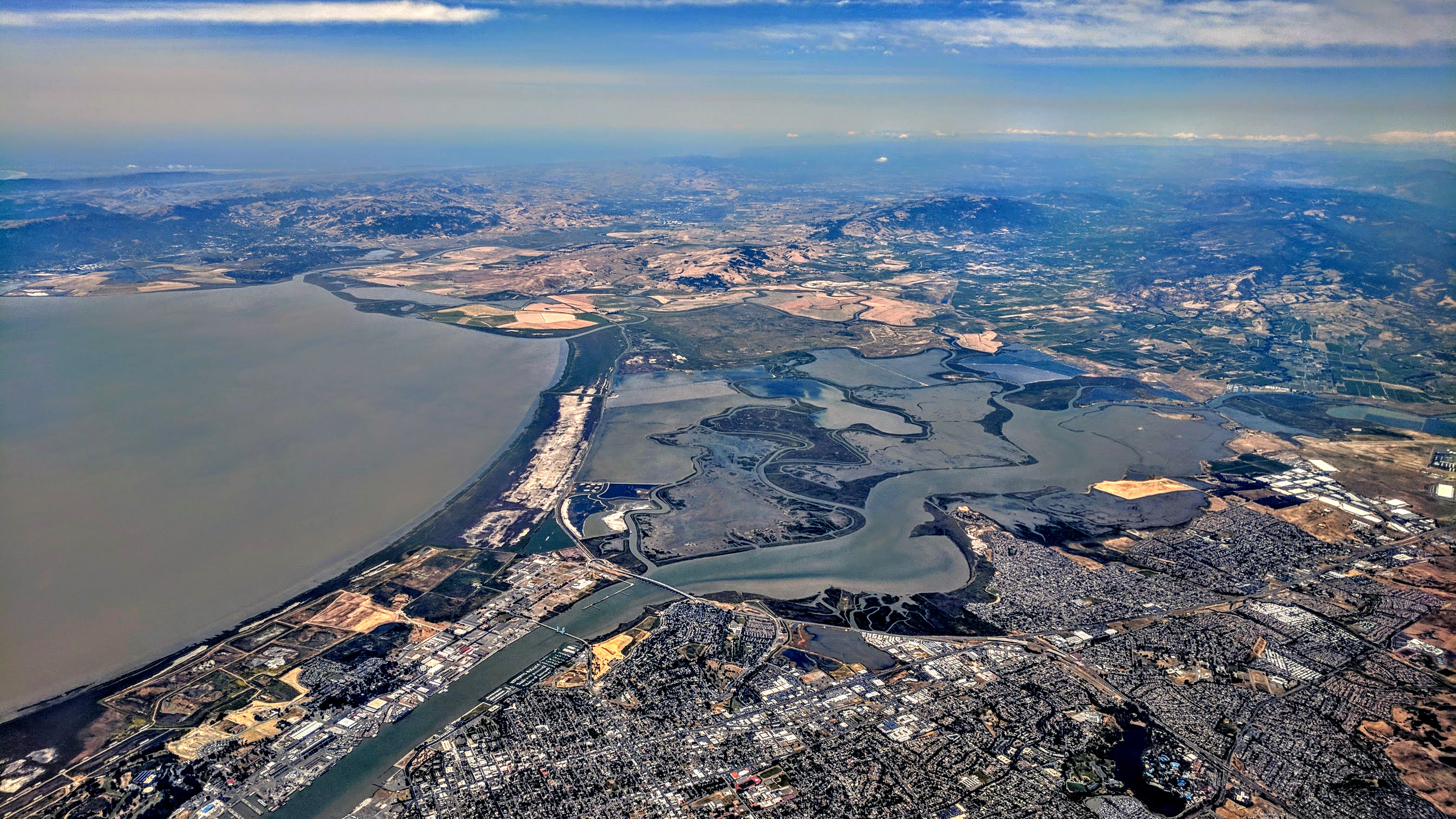
An aerial view, looking toward the west, of the Napa River where it flows into San Pablo Bay through Vallejo. Islands visible include, from bottom of image: Mare, No. 1, Knight, Russ, No. 2, Green, Bull, Edgerly, Coon, Little, and Tubbs.

Island No. 1 (formerly called Cross Island) is a partially submerged island in the Napa River, upstream of San Pablo Bay (an embayment of San Francisco Bay). It is in Napa and Solano County, California, and parts of it are managed as part of the Napa-Sonoma Marshes Wildlife Area. Its coordinates are 38°08′35″N 122°20′40″W, and the United States Geological Survey measured its elevation as 3 ft (0.91 m) in 1981. It, along with Island No. 2, Green Island and Tubbs Island, are labeled on a 1902 USGS map of the area.
