= Bull Island (California) =

Island in the Napa River in California

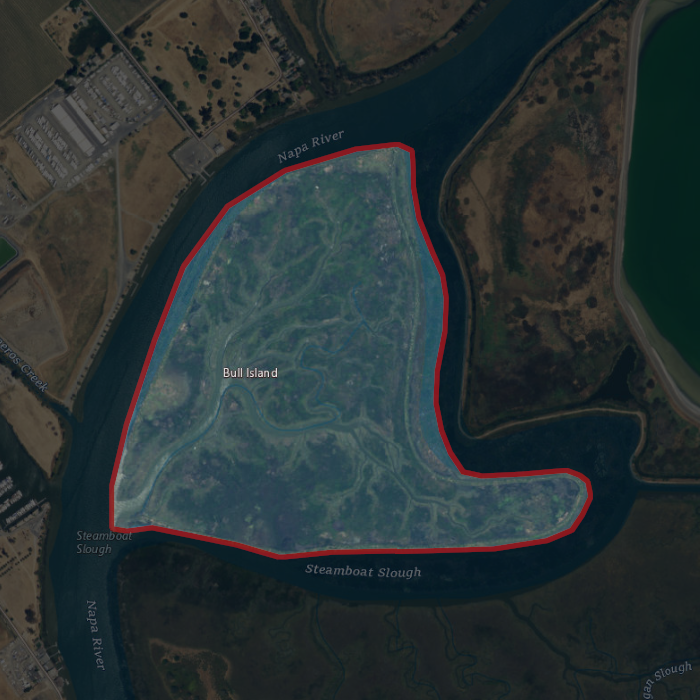
- USGS aerial imagery of Bull Island

- Location within California Location within the United States

Geography
- Location: Northern California
- Coordinates: 38°13′20″N 122°18′24″W
- Adjacent to: Napa River
- Highest elevation: 3 ft (0.9 m)

Administration
- United States
- State: California
- County: Napa

Bull Island is an island in the Napa River, in Napa County, California. From the 1880s onward, it was owned by the Money family, who constructed levees and reclaimed the land, using it to farm grain and potatoes. It was described as a "fine ranch" in 1918. After a levee failure in 1954, it gradually eroded into the water, becoming a salt marsh; for some time afterward, it was used as an evaporation pond for the industrial production of salt by the Leslie Salt Company. Beginning in the 1970s, Bull Island was proposed for inclusion in a variety of riparian preservation projects, but none came to fruition. However, in 1997, the Money family (who still owned the island) sold it to the California State Lands Commission, who turned it into a wildlife habitat; today it is administered as part of the Fagan Marsh Ecological Reserve, and hosts animals of numerous endangered species.

== Geography ==
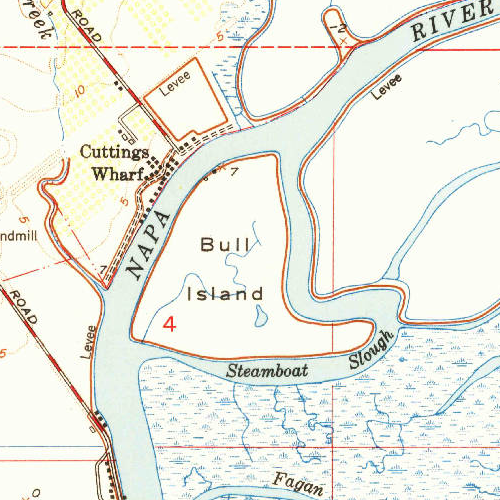
Bull Island as it appears on a 1951 USGS topographic map.

Bull Island is in Napa County, California, and its coordinates are 38°13′20″N 122°18′24″W. The United States Geological Survey gave its elevation as 3 ft (0.91 m) in 1981. It is located in the Napa River, upstream of San Pablo Bay (an embayment of San Francisco Bay), and managed as part of Fagan Marsh Ecological Reserve, directly adjacent to the Napa-Sonoma Marshes Wildlife Area. The island, with its "spongy mud banks thick with pickleweed, worm holes and bright red ants", provides "a buffer for flood runoff while also acting as a sponge for filtering potential pollutants". Bull Island is closed to hunting.

Some plants that grow on Bull Island include perennial pepperweed, soft bird's beak, delta tule pea, Marin knotweed, pickleweed, and Suisun marsh aster. Animals that live on Bull Island include the California clapper rail, Samuel's song sparrow, and salt marsh harvest mouse.

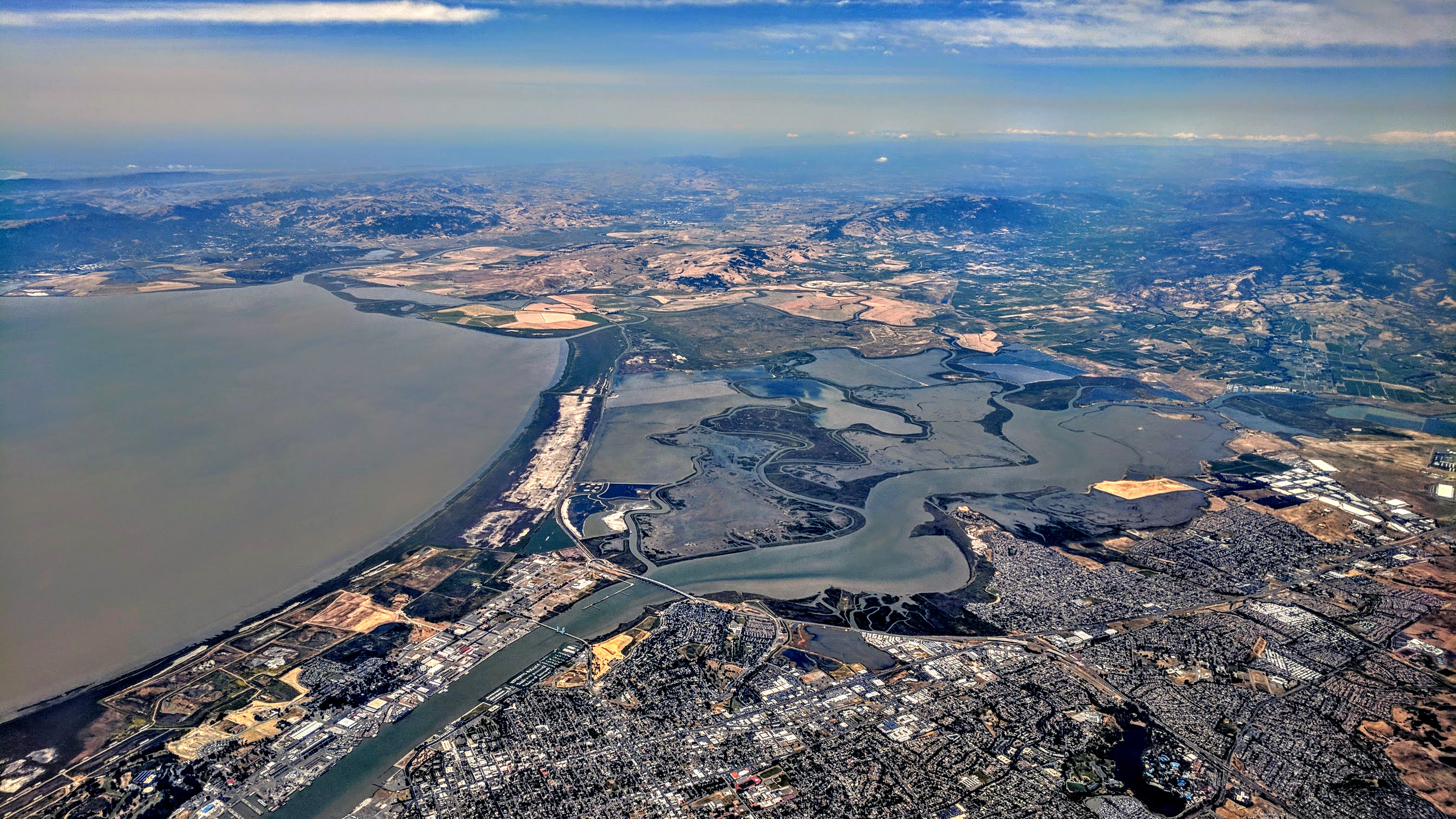
An aerial view, looking toward the west, of the Napa River where it flows into San Pablo Bay through Vallejo. Islands visible include, from bottom of image: Mare, No. 1, Knight, Russ, No. 2, Green, Bull, Edgerly, Coon, Little, and Tubbs.

== History ==
Bull Island, with its naturally rich silt loam soil, was well suited to farming. The earliest cultivation of the island took place some time in the 1860s. In 1884, it was the endpoint of a survey of the Napa River conducted by the United States Army Corps of Engineers. It was acquired by the Money family that same year, who proceeded to use it for farming. In 1892, there was a railroad bridge near the island, and in 1897, the island was owned by William Bradford and several others. In September 1903, a quitclaim transferred the island from A.V. Hall to E.M. Wilson, for $10 ($358.00 in 2025). In 1903, the area of the island was given as 125.38 acres (50.74 ha). In October 1903, Carlisle Roe and several others transferred their entire interest in the island to Henry Gehrman and Frank H. Sovereign. In return, Gehrman and Sovereign transferred to Roe and the others a one-eighth interest in the island. In June and July 1909, Fred Money contracted Henry Goosen to sink a series of five wells on Bull Island; while four (including one 861 ft (262 m) deep) failed to produce water, the fifth (at only 71 ft (22 m)) yielded a "big flow". In August, Goosen sued Mooney for alleged failure to pay $1,648 ($59,053 in 2025) owed for the work. In April 1911, proceedings were still underway; Mooney claimed that he had only contracted Goosen to sink one well (and that Goosen had "bored the last four wells on his own responsibility"). Goosen responded that at the time, he had said to Mooney "my reputation is at stake—I will deliver fresh water to you".

By 1918, Bull Island was described as a "fine ranch" which produced "large crops". That year, Oscar F. Bell entered a lease for Bull Island. In 1942, it was still used as grazing land; that June, several California forestry department fire suppression crew were "piled into a rowboat" to put out a grass and brush fire on Bull Island. In 1950, T.D. Money was farming Pontiac potatoes on Bull Island; the California Agriculture Department gave him a "perfect score" for his disease-free crop. Walt Crivelli farmed on the island for a time.

In 1933, the drilling of wells would once again become an issue on Bull Island. In September of that year, then-owner Emma R.D. Noble accused H.W. and May Norman, owners of a fishing resort on the adjacent Cutting's Wharf, of tapping a well bore sideways underneath Bull Island. Noble filed suit against the Normans, as well as the county's Board of Supervisors, who she said had approved the drilling contract. Later that month, the county filed an answer to the injunction action, saying that the well drilled by Norman had only sunk 87 ft (27 m) to gravel, and at no point entered the groundwater of Bull Island. At that point, the county intended to abandon the well, and had "no objection to its use by Mrs. Noble".

Bull Island continued to be a "prime piece of agricultural real estate" until its levees flooded in the winter of 1954; afterwards, the island remained submerged and gradually became a salt marsh. In 1982, Bull Island remained an isolated location, reachable "only by boat or helicopter".

In 1972, a single-engine aircraft attempting to make an approach at the Napa County Airport instead crash-landed on Bull Island. In September 1972, the California Department of Fish and Game was "concerned" about several sections of the Napa River, including the marshlands of Bull Island, saying in a report that "riparian growth along the river has suffered both as a result of channelization and urban growth". In the process of restoring vegetation, the department said that "the population of the curlew, sandpiper, and other nesting waterfowl in Bull Island marshlands must be protected" by the planting of rush after the construction of a new levee. This work was expected to "cut off the nose" of the island when the river's channel was broadened.

By May 1974, work was expected to begin on the Napa River flood control project the next spring, potentially including the construction of a wildlife refuge on Bull Island. However, by September, it became clear that the project would be delayed "for the umpteenth time", due to conflicts between Army Corps of Engineers and local flood control district managers. The Napa Valley Register said that "the Corps problem can be blamed on the California Department of Fish and Game's recent demand that the Corps provide some 1,400 acres (570 ha) of new wildlife marshlands refuge to compensate for disturbing other wildlife habitat with project construction". A "marshland buffer strip" planned for river banks near Bull Island, specifically, was expected to "hang the project up for some time in negotiations". However, after the Corps approved construction for the project, Napa County residents voted against it, and it was never carried out. In 1987, studies for carrying out a similar project were added to the "list of recommended projects for the Army Corps of Engineers".

By the late 1980s, Bull Island was one of many areas along San Francisco Bay where the Leslie Salt Company had evaporation ponds for commercial salt harvesting. On the island, however, an old barn and duck hunting club still existed, with the Napa Valley Register saying in 1989 that "the ducks are not as plentiful, the ponds and slews are filling in, but we still have freedom to hunt and enjoy a sport that is rich in tradition".

In 1996, the Napa County Land Trust and the Napa County Wildlife Commission began cooperating a purchase of the island and "keep it in open space and available to the general public". This $120,000 ($240,672 in 2025) transaction eventually took place in April 1997, at which point the California State Lands Commission purchased the island from the Money family (who had owned it since 1884). It became a "permanent piece of protected land, open for all uses—fishing, hunting, bird watching and just enjoying". The purchase was made possible by a large settlement paid by the Shell Oil Company following a 1988 oil spill. One year later, the island was described as "really an important area, not only for North Bay habitat restoration, but as a focus of national interest". By 2003, it had been established as a wildlife area free from human interference, with schoolchildren taking field trips there.
