= Russ Island =

Island in California

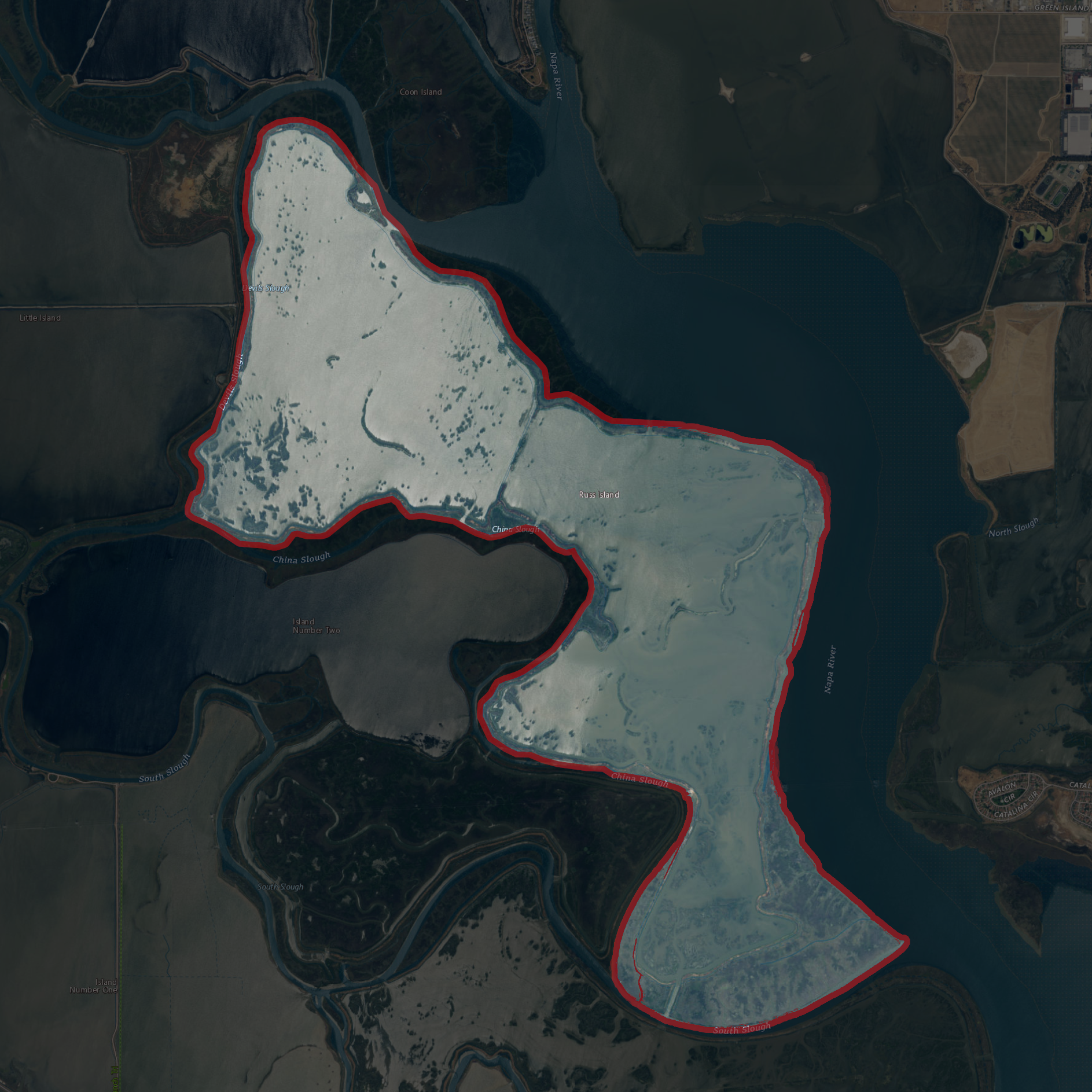
- USGS aerial imagery of Russ Island

- Location within San Francisco Bay Area Location within California Location within the United States

Geography
- Location: Northern California
- Coordinates: 38°10′13″N 122°18′44″W
- Adjacent to: Napa River
- Highest elevation: 3 ft (0.9 m)

Administration
- United States
- State: California
- County: Napa and Solano

Russ Island is a mostly-submerged island in the Napa River, in Napa and Solano Counties, California. It was reclaimed in the late 19th century, and spent many years as productive farmland; in the 1950s, however, it was purchased by the Leslie Salt Company, and deliberately submerged to serve as an evaporation pond for salt production. The company allowed parts of it to be used for duck hunting. By the 1990s, it was acquired by the California Department of Fish and Game, who turned it into a wildlife preserve, and allowed it to return to marshland; it is now managed as part of the Napa-Sonoma Marshes Wildlife Area, and is open to hunting, fishing, birdwatching, photography and hiking activities.

== Geography ==
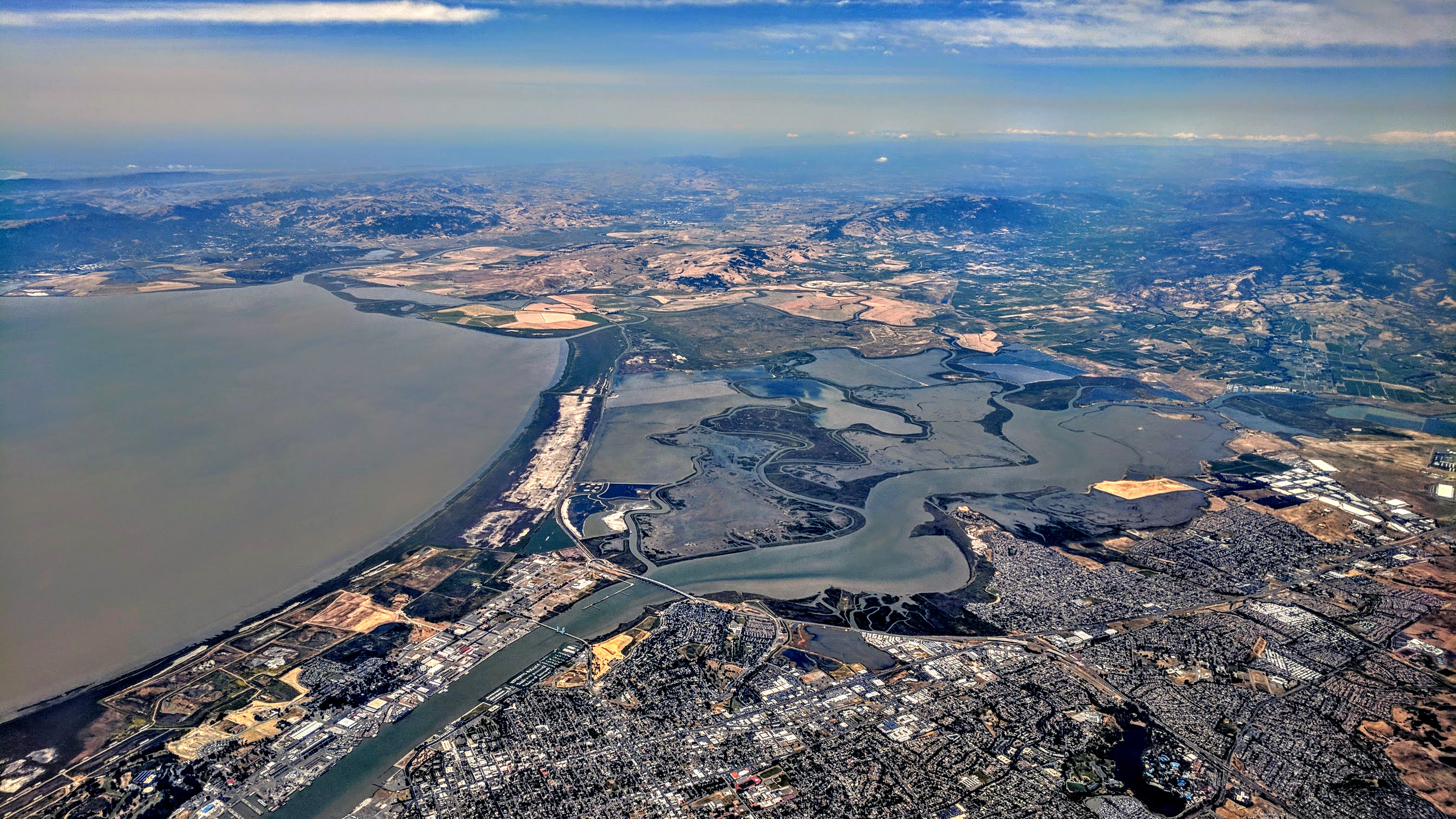
An aerial view, looking toward the west, of the Napa River where it flows into San Pablo Bay through Vallejo. Islands visible include, from bottom of image: Mare, No. 1, Knight, Russ, No. 2, Green, Bull, Edgerly, Coon, Little, and Tubbs.

Russ Island is located in the Napa River, upstream of San Pablo Bay (an embayment of San Francisco Bay). Its north end is in Napa County and its south end is in Solano County. Russ Island is bounded to east by the Napa River, beyond which is the city of American Canyon. To its southeast, on the other side of the Napa River, is Vallejo. To its south is South Slough (beyond which is Knight Island) and to its southwest is China Slough (beyond which is Island No. 2). To its west is Devils Slough, beyond which is Little Island; to its north is Napa Slough, beyond which are Coon Island and Edgerley Island.

The United States Geological Survey measured its elevation as 3 ft (0.91 m) in 1981. However, it is mostly flooded: in 1998, it was described as "marshy with tall tulles and mud flats, making it impossible to use a wheeled vehicle".

== History ==
=== Initial settlement and farming ===
An official 1876 map of Napa County shows many islands of the Napa River in their present locations, albeit divided by levees and sloughs along different boundaries than they would later come to have. The land currently comprising Russ Island was shown, on this map, divided between a number of landowners: Harper & Langstaff, L.A. Bly, J.W. Pearson & Co., H.H. Gray, S. Gracy, H.S. King, F. Oppenheim, and J. Hughes. By 1895, the only landowners on the island were shown as L.A. Bly, W.J. Little, and C.E. Davis. By 1902, a United States Geological Survey map shows Russ Island as one mostly contiguous island, but covered in marsh and crossed by numerous sloughs; by 1916, USGS maps show it as being almost fully surrounded by levees. On the 1916 survey, as well as a 1942 survey, it is mislabeled as nearby "Knight Island"; however, by 1949 the error was corrected, and it is shown as "Russ Island" in all maps thereafter.

In 1914, Frank E. Knight was leasing the island from the Z. Russ & Sons Company and the Russ Investment Company. In May of that year, Russ's workers entered the island "for the purpose of repairing the levees, promising to protect [Knight]'s interests there"; Knight alleged that "the work was so done that the levees were partially destroyed, the sluice gates ruined and the wharves demolished". Knight subsequently filed a lawsuit against Russ in January 1916, seeking damages of $26,500 ($784,060 in 2025).

In 1921, Russ Island was one of the "better known" of multiple islands lying in "an area of very fertile delta lands lying in the triangle whose points are Vallejo, Napa and Ignacio, which is bounded on the west by the Nama River, and on the northeast by Sonoma Creek, and other sloughs". The area, at the time, was not "traveled by any through country or State road"; a city engineer of nearby Vallejo proposed to build a highway through the area.

In 1926, a large plot of Harding grass was "doing well" on the island; by November 1926, it was "doing exceptionally well".

=== Incinerator proposal ===
In April 1932, the Napa Fertilizer and Reduction Company (whose partners included one William N. Russ) planned to acquire a 25-year garbage disposal contract with the City and County of San Francisco; it proposed to construct a garbage incinerator on Russ Island.

The project met with vocal resistance from the Napa Chamber of Commerce, which passed a resolution opposing the project the same month. The Napa County Fish, Game and Forest Protective Association, which also passed resolutions to the same effect, "opposed the plan as being detrimental to hunting and fishing and to the general good of the county". In May, the city attorney of county seat Napa wrote a resolution urging the county's Board of Supervisors to disallow construction of the incinerator, which was passed unanimously by the city council. Ultimately, they "firmly refused" the construction of the plant, declaring themselves "opposed to the idea of garbage and refuse being shipped into this county in great quantities". The project was blocked, but would be "revived" in 1934 when "it became known that Commandant Yancey S. Williams of Mare Island Navy Yard had been asked the attitude of the government toward establishment of the project". In response, directors of the Vallejo Chamber of Commerse "ordered a letter of protest sent to the Napa supervisors".

=== Sheep and cattle ranching ===
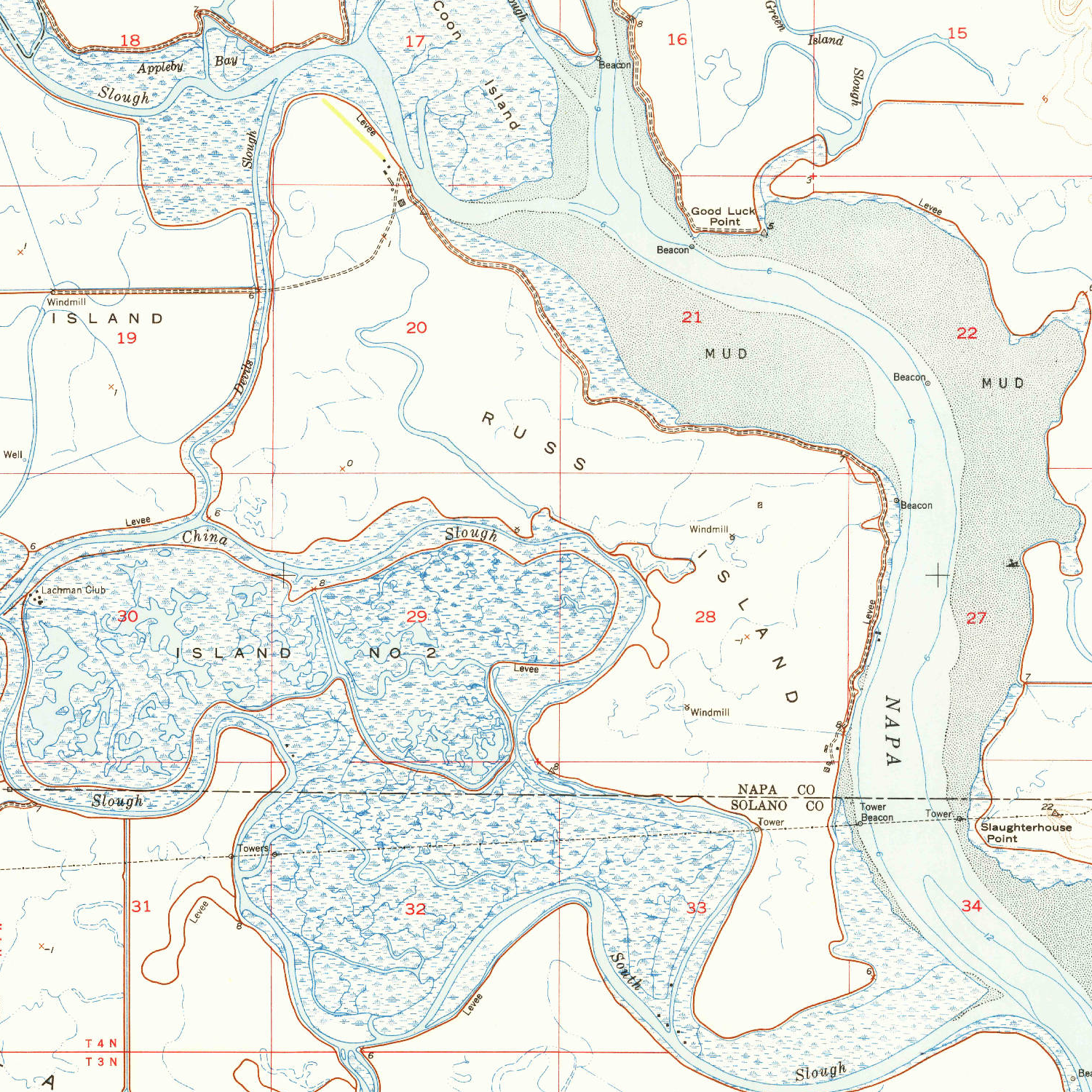
Russ Island as it appears on a 1951 USGS topographic map.

In 1945, the entirety of Russ Island (comprising some 3,600 acres (1,500 ha)) was offered for sale for $190,000 ($3.4 million in 2025); the posting advertised "rich, level soil, well drained [...] perfect climate, no stock pests or cattle rustlers can approach ranch". By 1946, William W. "Tiny" Naylor, a restaurateur from Beverly Hills, owned Russ Island, as well as nearby Little Island. At the time, the property was leased by the Crivelli Brothers, who used it to plant oats, barley and vetch. Two years later, two cattlemen of Napa Valley (Andrew Pelissa and John Hale) purchased the island from Naylor, for approximately $185,000 ($2.48 million in 2025). The transaction was completed in July 1948. Pelissa and Hale ran sheep and cattle ranches on the island (as well as on other lands in Napa and Modoc counties). Hubert Fruehauf, a farmer who took a "leading role in Napa County agriculture from the standpoint of both crop production and legislation", also leased Russ Island in the 20th century.

In 1948, a rented monoplane crashed on the island, killing one passenger and critically injuring another. The incident was subsequently investigated by the Civil Aeronautics Administration. The next year, another crash would occur, when a training aircraft from nearby Hamilton Field "plunged into an oatfield". The pilot, 2nd Lieutenant William Ocker, was ejected from the cockpit and killed instantly. The passenger, 1st Lieutenant Williard A. Smith, was seriously injured; he was freed from the wreckage by local farm workers who were out hunting pheasant.

In November 1951, an agreement was reached for Pelissa to sell the island for $600,000 ($7.44 million in 2025) to S.J. Pringle, who was "acting as an agent for an undisclosed principal". According to the title company, it was "the largest single price ever paid for a tract in the county's history".

=== Salt production ===
In May 1952, the island was sold to the Leslie Salt Company, at the time "the largest salt producer on the West Coast and possibly the largest solar evaporation operation in the world". It was one of several islands in the Napa River purchased by the company (the total purchase included Edgerly Island, Little Island, Knight Island, Banty Island, Island No. 2, and part of Island No. 1). Leslie planned to flood and dike the islands to develop them into salt ponds; the entire project was projected to cost $3,500,000 ($42.4 million in 2025), and be ready for the first harvest in 1958. The salt was to be carried on barges down the Napa River, and primarily used in chemical plants. During the 1950s, this project was carried out, and Russ Island became a salt evaporation pond.

In September 1953, Russ Island was one of several areas added to the Napa Marshes waterfowl management area. Robert Lassen, supervisor of game for the district, said: "The Leslie Salt people have given the unattached hunter a big break in allowing the Department of Fish and Game to come in and manage their Napa marshes for hunting [...] there will be no limit on the number of hunters allowed into the Department-controlled area and no trespassing will be permitted elsewhere". Duck hunting on the island proved successful: in 1957, the Napa Duck Club had blinds set up there, and in 1959 Ed Hale wrote for the Napa Journal that "it was no trick at all to get our limit of ten bull cans".

In 1991, Russ Island continued to be operated by Leslie Salt. However, within several years, salt harvesting operations on the islands would cease.

=== Wildlife area ===
In the 1990s, the California Department of Fish and Game began acquiring the areas which now comprise the Napa-Sonoma Marshes Wildlife Area, including Russ Island. In 2003, the DFG purchased the Napa Plant Site from Leslie Salt (now a part of Cargill). In the Napa-Sonoma Marshes Wildlife Area Land Management Plan, Russ Island is referred to as Napa River Unit Ponds 4 and 5. The area is used for hunting, fishing, bird watching, photography, and hiking.
