= Little Island (California) =

Island in California

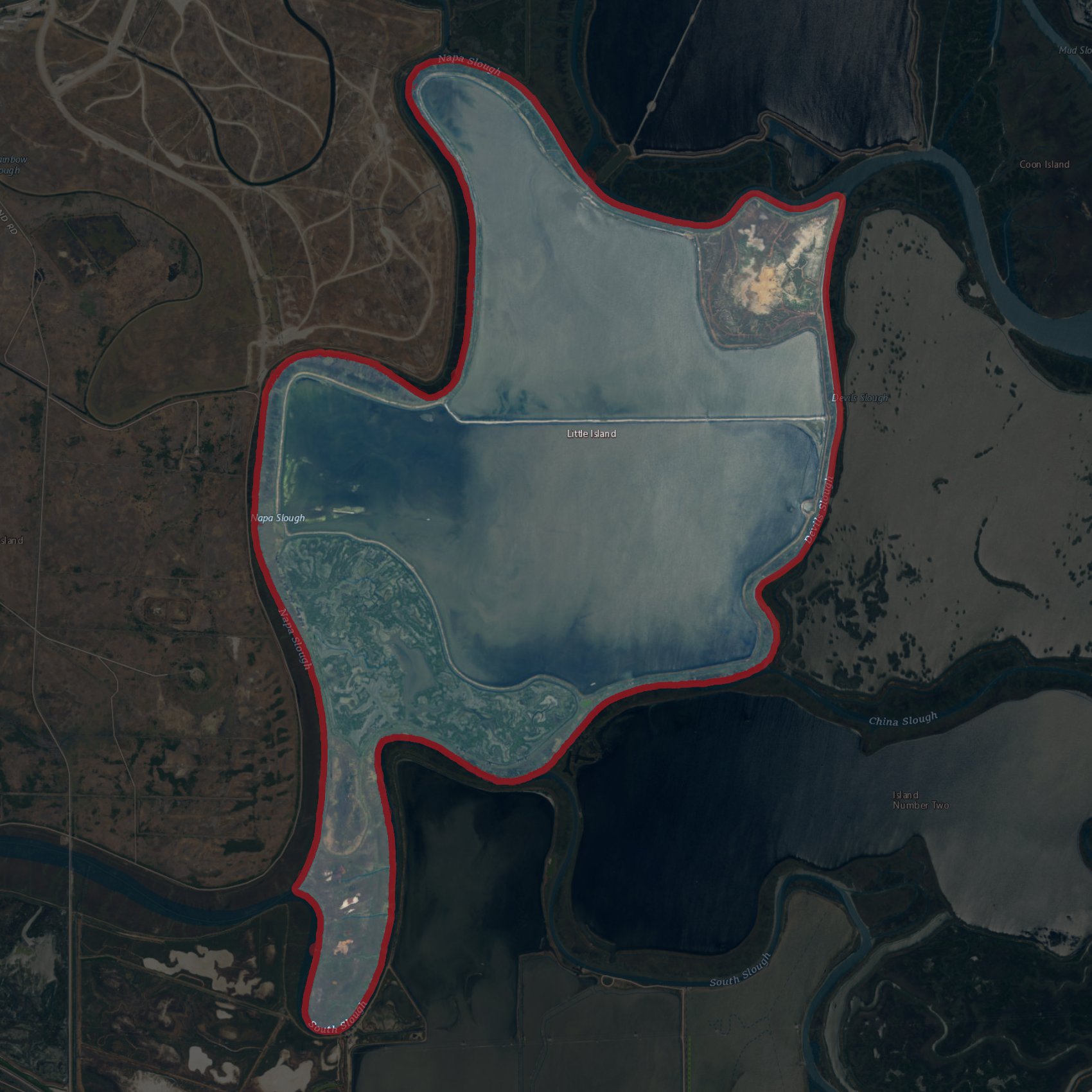
- USGS aerial imagery of Little Island

- Location within San Francisco Bay Area Location within California Location within the United States

Geography
- Location: Northern California
- Coordinates: 38°10′48″N 122°21′05″W
- Adjacent to: Napa River
- Highest elevation: 3 ft (0.9 m)

Administration
- United States
- State: California
- County: Napa and Solano

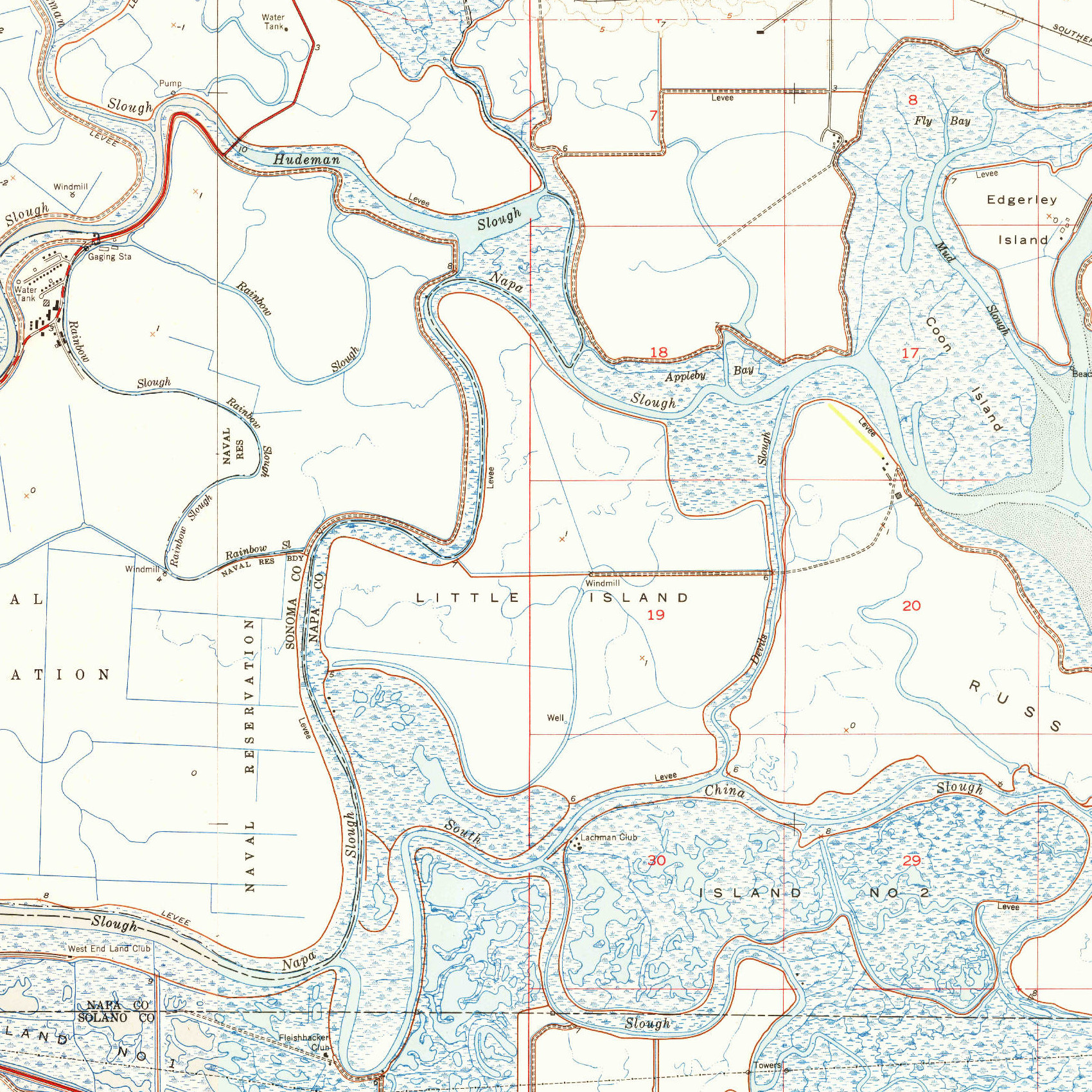
Little Island as it appears on a 1951 USGS topographic map.

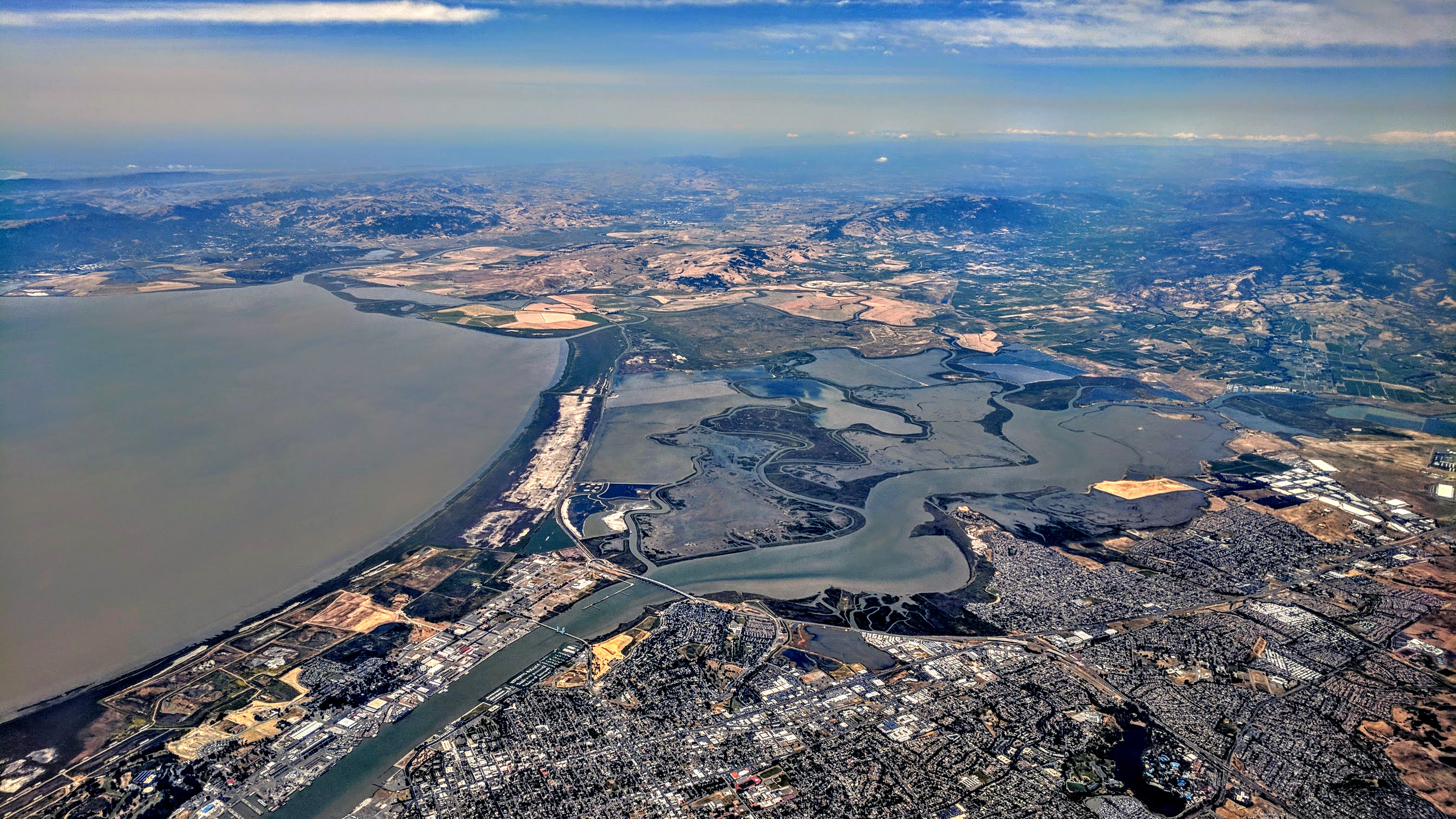
An aerial view, looking toward the west, of the Napa River where it flows into San Pablo Bay through Vallejo. Islands visible include, from bottom of image: Mare, No. 1, Knight, Russ, No. 2, Green, Bull, Edgerly, Coon, Little, and Tubbs.

Little Island is a partially submerged marsh island in the Napa Slough, branching off from the Napa River upstream of San Pablo Bay (an embayment of San Francisco Bay). It is almost entirely in Napa County, California, although part of its southern tip is in Solano County; it is managed as part of the Napa-Sonoma Marshes Wildlife Area. Its coordinates are 38°10′48″N 122°21′05″W, and the United States Geological Survey measured its elevation as 3 ft (0.91 m) in 1981.
