= Tubbs Island =

Island in California

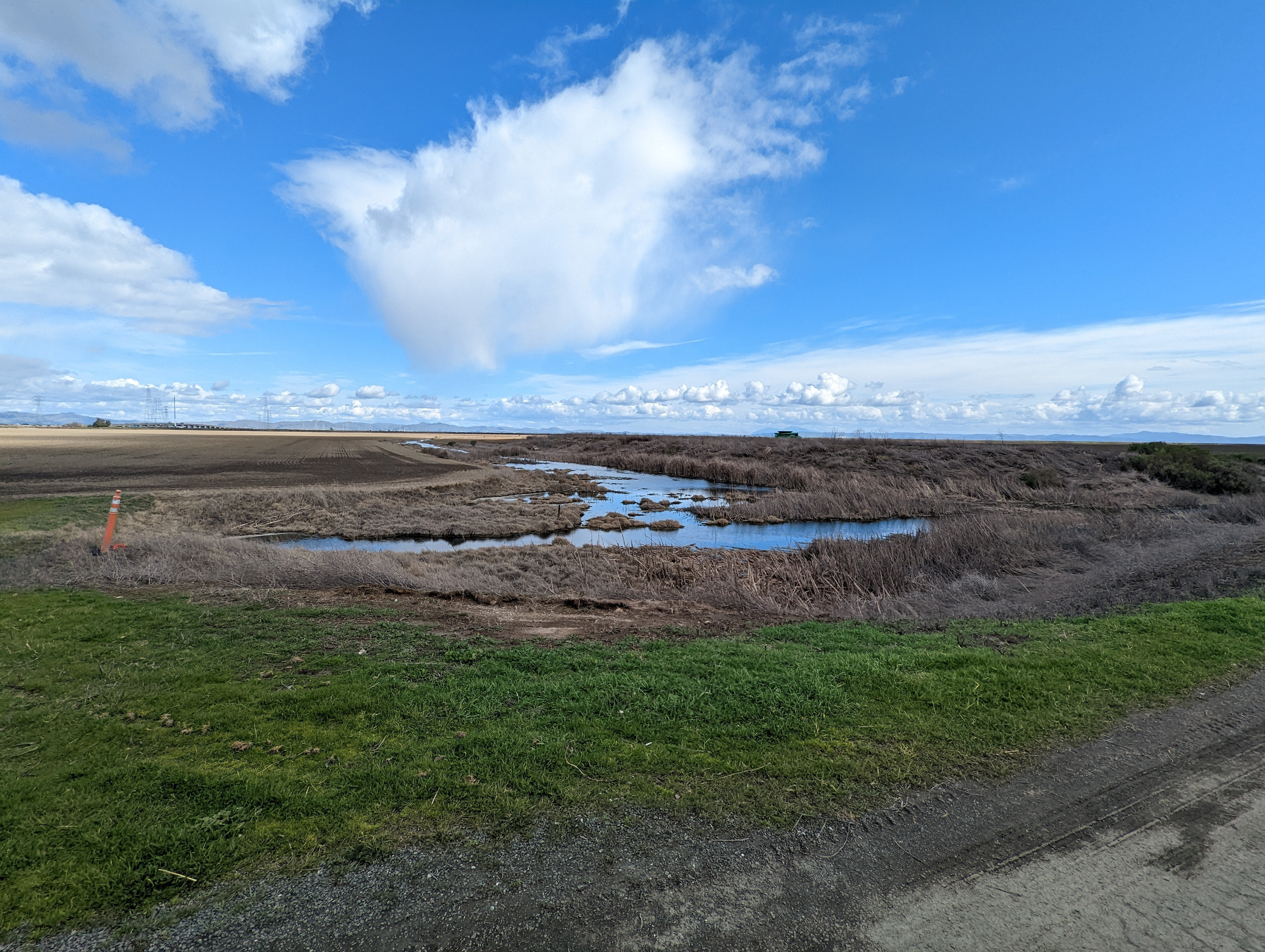
- Tubbs Island in March 2023.

- Location within San Francisco Bay Area Location within California Location within the United States

Geography
- Location: Northern California
- Coordinates: 38°08′59″N 122°25′27″W
- Adjacent to: San Pablo Bay
- Highest elevation: 0 ft (0 m)

Administration
- United States
- State: California
- County: Sonoma

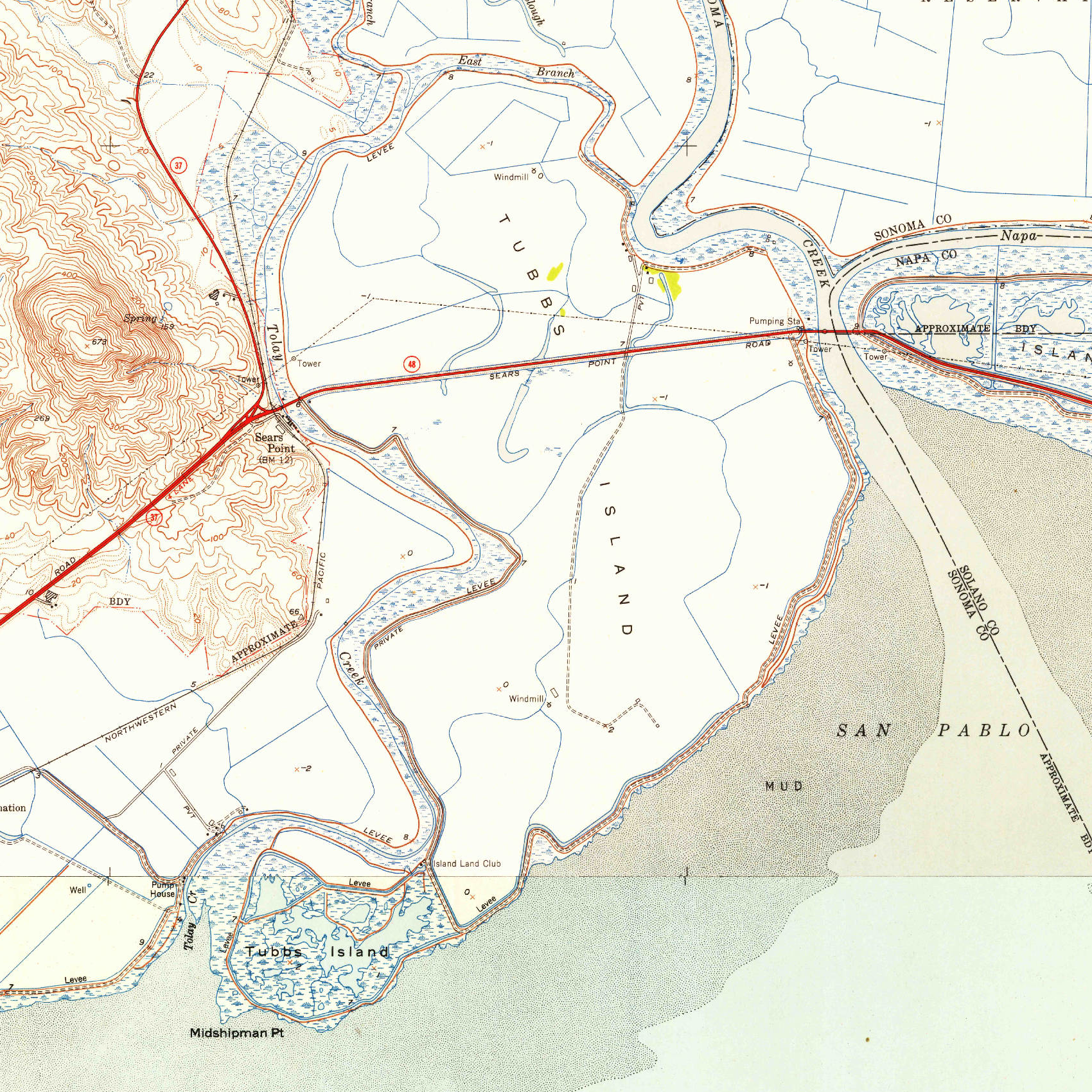
Tubbs Island as it appears on a 1951 USGS topographic map.

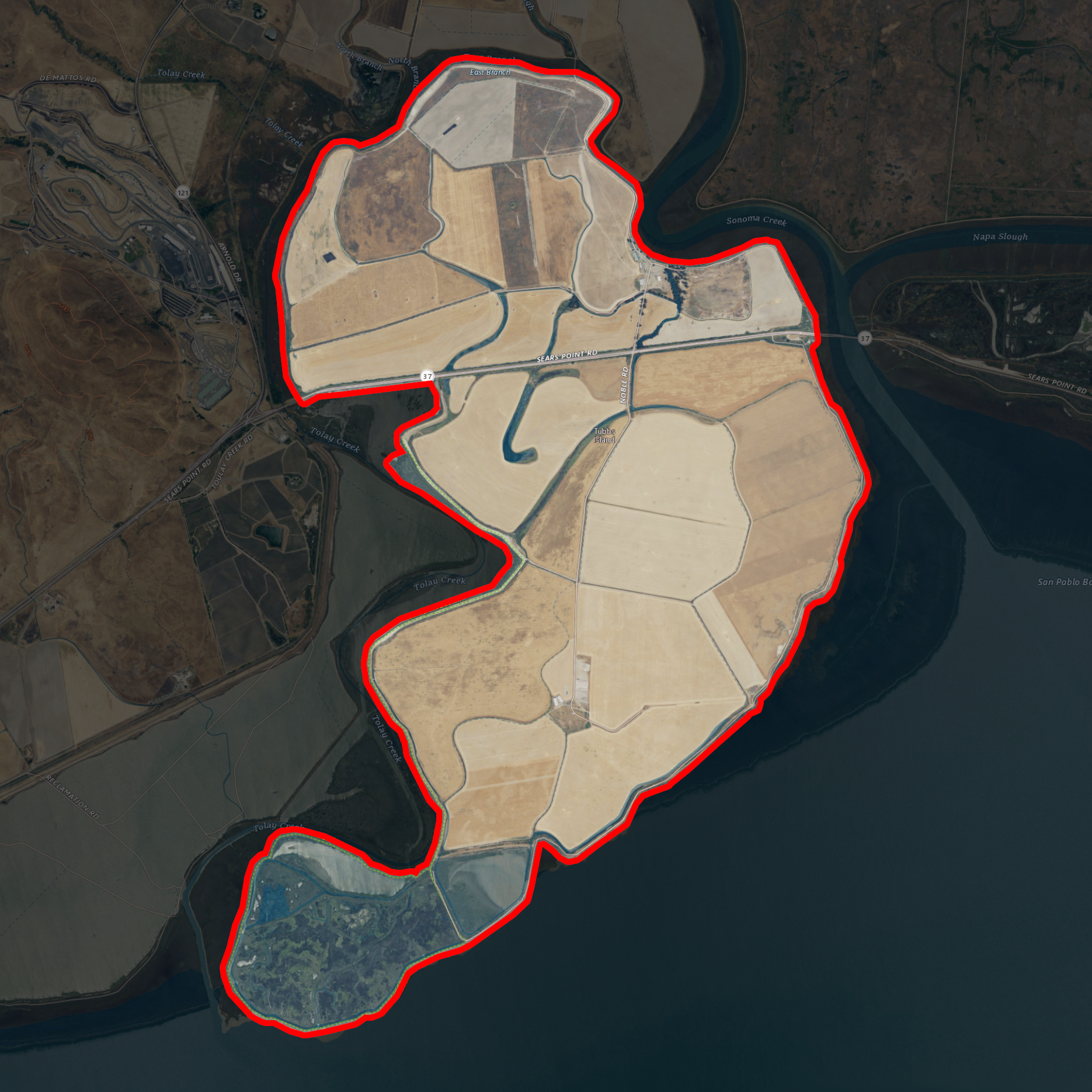
USGS aerial imagery of Tubbs Island from 2021

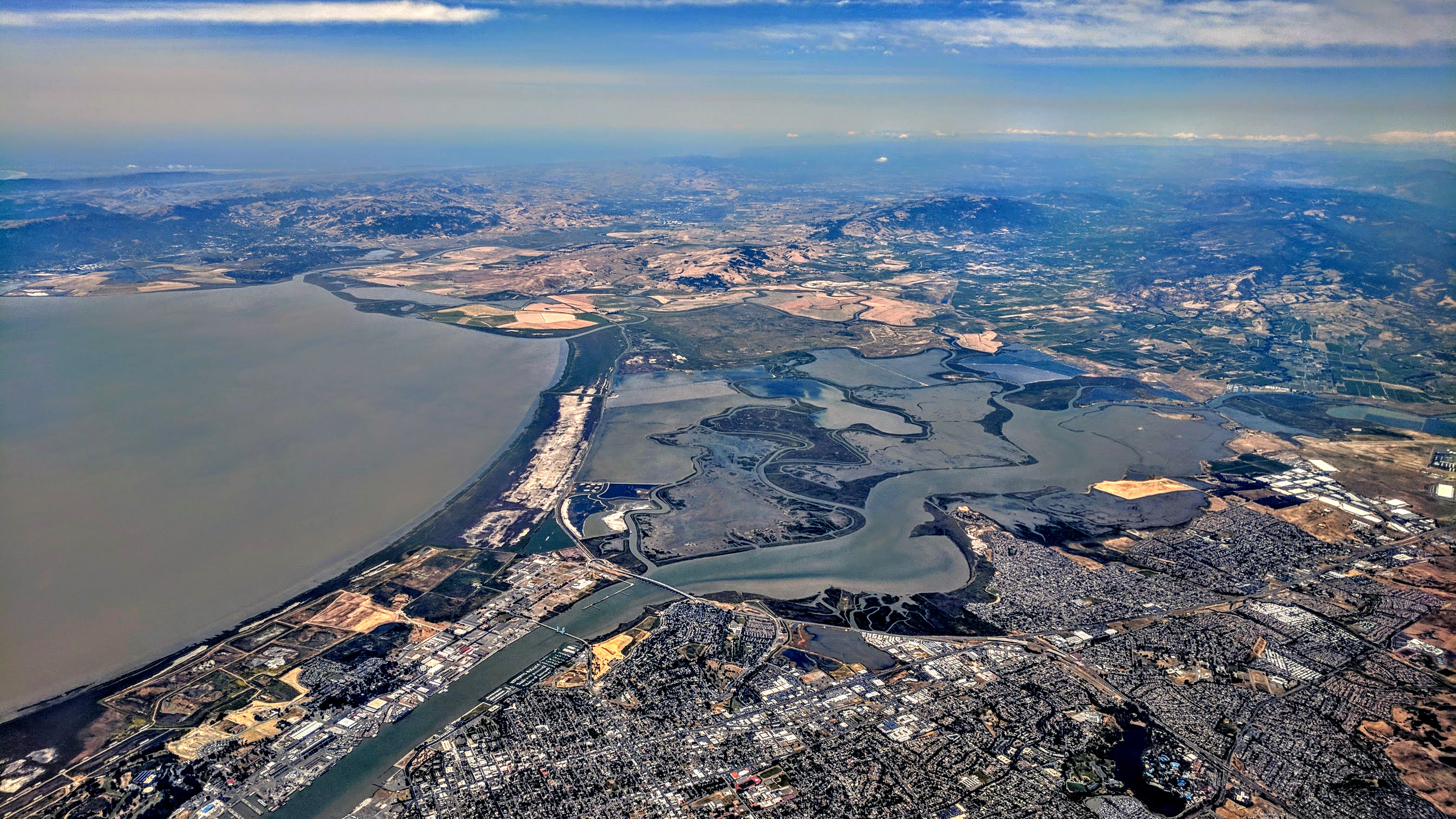
An aerial view, looking toward the west, of the Napa River where it flows into San Pablo Bay through Vallejo. Islands visible include, from bottom of image: Mare, No. 1, Knight, Russ, No. 2, Green, Bull, Edgerly, Coon, Little, and Tubbs.

Tubbs Island is an island in San Pablo Bay (an embayment of San Francisco Bay). It is in Sonoma County, California, and parts of it are managed as part of the Napa-Sonoma Marshes Wildlife Area. Its coordinates are 38°08′59″N 122°25′27″W, and the United States Geological Survey measured its elevation as 0 ft (0 m) in 1981. It, along with Island No. 1, Island No. 2 and Green Island, are labeled on a 1902 USGS map of the area.

Tubbs Island used to be home to a town of the same name, but now all that remains is a single outhouse visible from SR 37. The rest of the town is below the surface of the mud. Following the disappearance of the town, Tubbs Island was used as a gunnery range and chemical weapons testing site. The government has since invested into multiple cleanups of the island, mainly of contaminated soil, sediment, and water.

The point on the southwestern end of Tubbs Island is named "Midshipman Point". It was previously diked agricultural land, but has since been restored to marshland by Audubon California.
