= San Pablo Bay =

Tidal estuary in the San Francisco Bay Area

Coordinates: 38°04′N 122°23′W

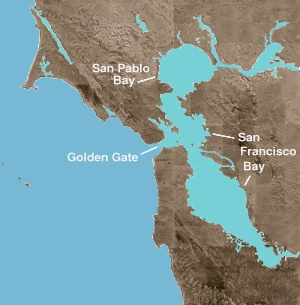
San Pablo Bay, shown with San Francisco Bay

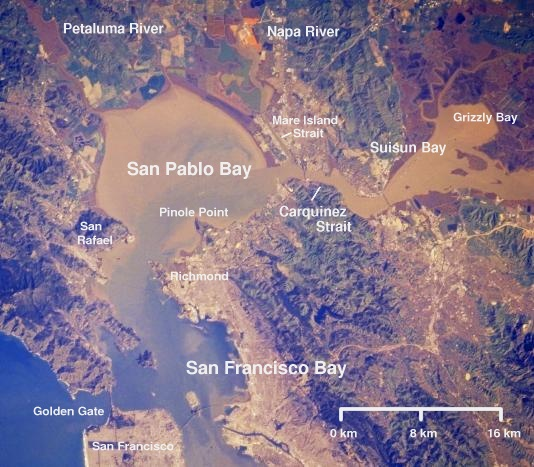
San Pablo Bay and the Carquinez Strait

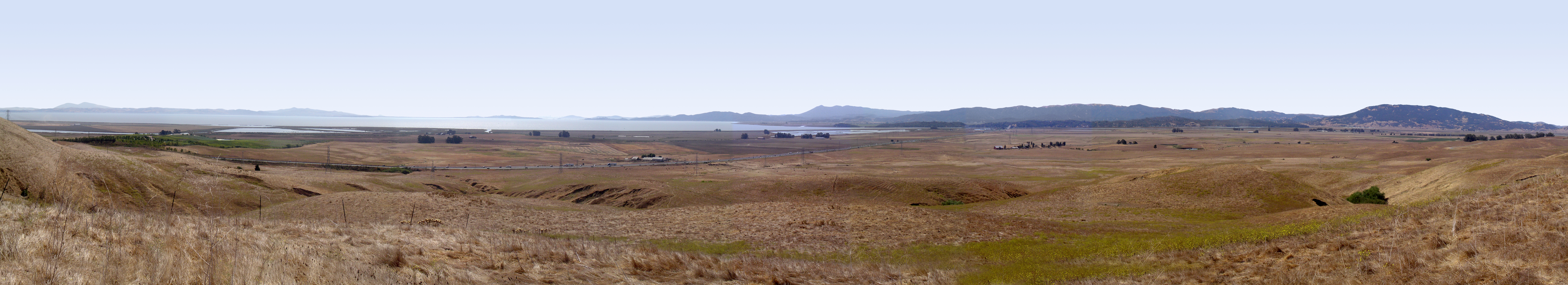
Panorama of San Pablo Bay from Wildcat Mountain near Sears Point in Sonoma County

San Pablo Bay is a tidal estuary that forms the northern extension of the San Francisco Bay in the East Bay and North Bay regions of the San Francisco Bay Area in northern California.

Most of the Bay is shallow; however, there is a deep water channel approximately in the middle of the bay, which allows access to major ports in Sacramento, Stockton, Benicia, and Martinez; and other smaller ports on the Sacramento–San Joaquin River Delta.

== Geography ==
San Pablo Bay was named after Rancho San Pablo, a Spanish land grant given to colonial Alta California settlers in 1815, on the bay at the site of the present-day city of San Pablo. The bay is approximately 10 mi (16 km) across and has an area of approximately 90 mi^{2} (230 km^{2}).

The bay receives the waters of the Sacramento and San Joaquin rivers, via Suisun Bay and the Carquinez Strait on its northeast end, and it connects to the Pacific Ocean via the San Francisco Bay on its southern end. The bay is heavily silted from the contributions of the two rivers, which themselves drain most of the Central Valley of California. San Pablo Bay also receives the waters of Sonoma Creek through the Napa Sonoma Marsh, San Rafael Creek, and the Petaluma River directly, and the Napa River which flows into the Carquinez Strait via the Mare Island Strait near its entrance into the bay. All tributaries except for Sonoma Creek are commercially navigable and maintained by the U.S. Army Corps of Engineers.

Two peninsulas separate San Pablo Bay from San Francisco Bay. The eastern, Point San Pablo, is in the city of Richmond and the western, Point San Pedro, borders the city of San Rafael. The bay is shared between Contra Costa county on the southern and eastern shore, and Solano, Sonoma and Marin counties on the northern and western shores. The county boundaries meet near the center of the bay. Communities on the shores of San Pablo Bay include: Richmond, San Pablo, Pinole, Hercules, Rodeo in Contra Costa County, Vallejo in Solano County, along with Novato and San Rafael in Marin County.

Because the Bay is close to several major and local airports, but outside of the main air traffic corridors, it is a popular pilot training area.

Because of its great size but shallow waters, San Pablo Bay frequently has difficult boating conditions. The prevailing western wind meets strong currents both at Carquinez Straits and, at the opposite end of the bay, near the Richmond Bridge, to produce large waves, with few areas of retreats for most boats.

== Ecology ==
There are many undeveloped shore lands with salt marshes and mudflats. The Bay is a primary wintering stop for the canvasback duck population on the Pacific Flyway, as well as a migratory staging ground for numerous species of waterfowl. Much of the northern shore of the bay is protected as part of the San Pablo Bay National Wildlife Refuge.

Endangered species that are found in the bay include the California brown pelican, California clapper rail, and salt marsh harvest mouse. This is a popular destination for recreation fishing, with Saltwater species including: striped bass, surfperch, sturgeon, starry flounder, leopard shark, topsmelt, and anchovy. In the 1880s there was a shrimp-fishing village, where some 500 Chinese people lived; they shipped approximately 90% of their catch to China. The location is now part of China Camp State Park.

== Popular culture ==
San Pablo Bay is the setting of alternative rock band Primus's four-part song series "Fisherman's Chronicles," and is also referenced in "The Toys Go Winding Down", "Harold of the Rocks" and "Ol' Diamondback Sturgeon". It is also mentioned in The Minus 5 song "John Barleycorn Must Live." In Susan Choi's book, American Woman, which mirrors the Patty Hearst scandal of the 1970s, the Bay's waters are said to welcome main characters Jenny and Pauline home after they've traversed from the East coast.

== See also ==
- Tributaries of San Pablo Bay
