= Black Point-Green Point, California =

Black Point-Green Point
- Unincorporated Community; Census Designated Place
- Location in Marin County and the state of California

- Location in the United States
- Coordinates: 38°6′35″N 122°30′13″W
- Country: United States
- State: California
- County: Marin

Government
  - County Board: District 5 Eric Lucan
  - Assembly: Damon Connolly (D)
  - State Senate: Mike McGuire (D)
  - U. S. Congress: Jared Huffman (D)

Area
  - Total: 2.90 sq mi (7.50 km^{2})
  - Land: 2.83 sq mi (7.32 km^{2})
  - Water: 0.069 sq mi (0.18 km^{2}) 0.44%
- Elevation: 13 ft (4.0 m)
- Highest elevation: 190 ft (57.9 m)
- Lowest elevation: 0 ft (0 m)

Population (2020)
  - Total: 1,431
  - Density: 506.19/sq mi (195.44/km^{2})
- Time zone: UTC-8 (PST)
  - Summer (DST): UTC-7 (PDT)
- ZIP code: 94945 (Novato)
- Area codes: 415/628
- FIPS code: 06-06982
- GNIS feature IDs: 2407857

Black Point-Green Point is a census-designated place (CDP) in Marin County, California, United States. It is unincorporated, sitting between the city of Novato to the southwest and the Petaluma River and San Pablo Bay to the northeast. The population was 1,431 at the 2020 census.

== History ==
Black Point was part of the Rancho de Novato land grant. The 1880 History of Marin County by Alley, Bowen and Co. mentions "a man by name of Day" who "settled on an island in Novato township which has since borne his name" in 1851. This island is still known as Day Island. According to the book, several more settlers moved into the area in 1853. Some of them owned land there, while others were squatters, a problem common across the county. Lumber that came from Black Point was used to build part of the USS Saginaw, a steamer built at the Mare Island Naval Shipyard. It served in the navy until 1870, when it ran aground on a reef not far from Ocean island. Deer Island, a former island east of Olive Avenue, actually was an island in the early 1900s. The house on the island, owned by Antonio DeBorba, whose shop on Grant Avenue is still intact, was completely encompassed by water, and his house was only accessible by boat. When both the county and the state refused to build a levee, he spent a small fortune deepening the creek and taking water out of the marsh. Once that was done, he donated the land that is now Highway 37.

The first Black Point post office operated from 1865 to 1891. The Grandview post office opened in 1905, changed its name to Black Point in 1944, and closed in 1952. Black Point-Green Point is located along the Brazos Railroad Subdivision, with Northwestern Pacific running trains through twice a week. Trains passing through Black Point-Green Point cross the Black Point Railroad Bridge, built in 1911. The fields to the south of Black Point were used for the location of the Black Point Communications Annex, an antenna array that was used to communicate with the Hamilton Air Force Base.

== Geography ==
Black Point-Green Point is 4 miles (6 km) east of the center of Novato and 11 miles (18 km) north of San Rafael, the Marin county seat. The Petaluma River, which forms the northeastern edge of the community, is the Sonoma County line.

According to the United States Census Bureau, the CDP has a total area of 2.9 square miles (7.5 km^{2}), of which 0.07 square miles (0.18 km^{2}), or 2.42%, are water. Black Point-Green Point is also located near various public lands, such as the Rush Creek Open Space Preserve and the Vince Mulroy Wildlife Prerserve.

== Commercial activity ==
There are several businesses in Black Point-Green Point, such as Rossi's Deli (an old gas station built in the 1930s), Penske Truck Rental, Kelleher Lumber, and two self-storages. There used to be an inn built during the 1890s, but it burned down in the spring of 1976. Black Point also used to have a train station and a freight depot near the lumberyard. Both the Northwestern Pacific Railroad and the Black Point Aggregates company used to operate a quarry in Black Point to produce ballast and fills for the railroad, as well as shipment abroad. The steep scars are still visible, although the flattened area is now part of the StoneTree Golf Course. Black Point was the location of the annual Northern California Renaissance Faire from 1971 to 1998, after which the site was developed into the StoneTree Golf Course.

== Demographics ==
Historical population
Census	Pop.	Note	%±
2000	1,143		—
2010	1,306		14.3%
2020	1,431		9.6%
U.S. Decennial Census; 1860–1870 1880-1890; 1900 1910 1920; 1930 1940 1950; 1960 1970 1980; 1990 2000 2010; 2020

Black Point-Green Point first appeared as a census designated place in the 2000 U.S. census.

=== Racial and ethnic composition ===
Black Point-Green Point CDP, California – Racial and ethnic composition Note: the US Census treats Hispanic/Latino as an ethnic category. This table excludes Latinos from the racial categories and assigns them to a separate category. Hispanics/Latinos may be of any race.
Race / Ethnicity (NH = Non-Hispanic)	Pop 2000	Pop 2010	Pop 2020	% 2000	% 2010	% 2020
White alone (NH)	1,023	1,117	1,105	89.50%	85.53%	77.22%
Black or African American alone (NH)	6	6	3	0.52%	0.46%	0.21%
Native American or Alaska Native alone (NH)	2	4	4	0.17%	0.31%	0.28%
Asian alone (NH)	25	44	91	2.19%	3.37%	6.36%
Native Hawaiian or Pacific Islander alone (NH)	10	0	1	0.87%	0.00%	0.07%
Other race alone (NH)	5	2	3	0.44%	0.15%	0.21%
Mixed race or Multiracial (NH)	22	21	81	1.92%	1.61%	5.66%
Hispanic or Latino (any race)	50	112	143	4.37%	8.58%	9.99%
Total	1,143	1,306	1,431	100.00%	100.00%	100.00%

=== 2020 census ===
As of the 2020 census, Black Point-Green Point had a population of 1,431. The population density was 506.2 inhabitants per square mile (195.4/km^{2}). The racial makeup was 80.0% White, 0.3% African American, 0.3% Native American, 6.4% Asian, 0.1% Pacific Islander, 3.4% from other races, and 9.5% from two or more races. Hispanic or Latino of any race were 10.0% of the population.

The age distribution was 12.3% under the age of 18, 8.7% aged 18 to 24, 15.9% aged 25 to 44, 30.6% aged 45 to 64, and 32.4% who were 65 years of age or older. The median age was 54.4 years. For every 100 females, there were 95.5 males, and for every 100 females age 18 and over there were 100.2 males age 18 and over.

79.2% of residents lived in urban areas, while 20.8% lived in rural areas.

The whole population lived in households. There were 588 households, out of which 20.4% included children under the age of 18, 56.5% were married-couple households, 8.2% were cohabiting couple households, 19.6% had a female householder with no partner present, and 15.8% had a male householder with no partner present. 24.1% of households were one person, and 13.6% were one person aged 65 or older. The average household size was 2.43. There were 401 families (68.2% of all households).

There were 616 housing units at an average density of 217.9 units per square mile (84.1 units/km^{2}), of which 588 (95.5%) were occupied. Of occupied units, 81.0% were owner-occupied and 19.0% were occupied by renters. Of all housing units, 4.5% were vacant; the homeowner vacancy rate was 1.0% and the rental vacancy rate was 1.8%.

== Education ==
The CDP is served by the Novato Unified School District.
