= Washington Creek =

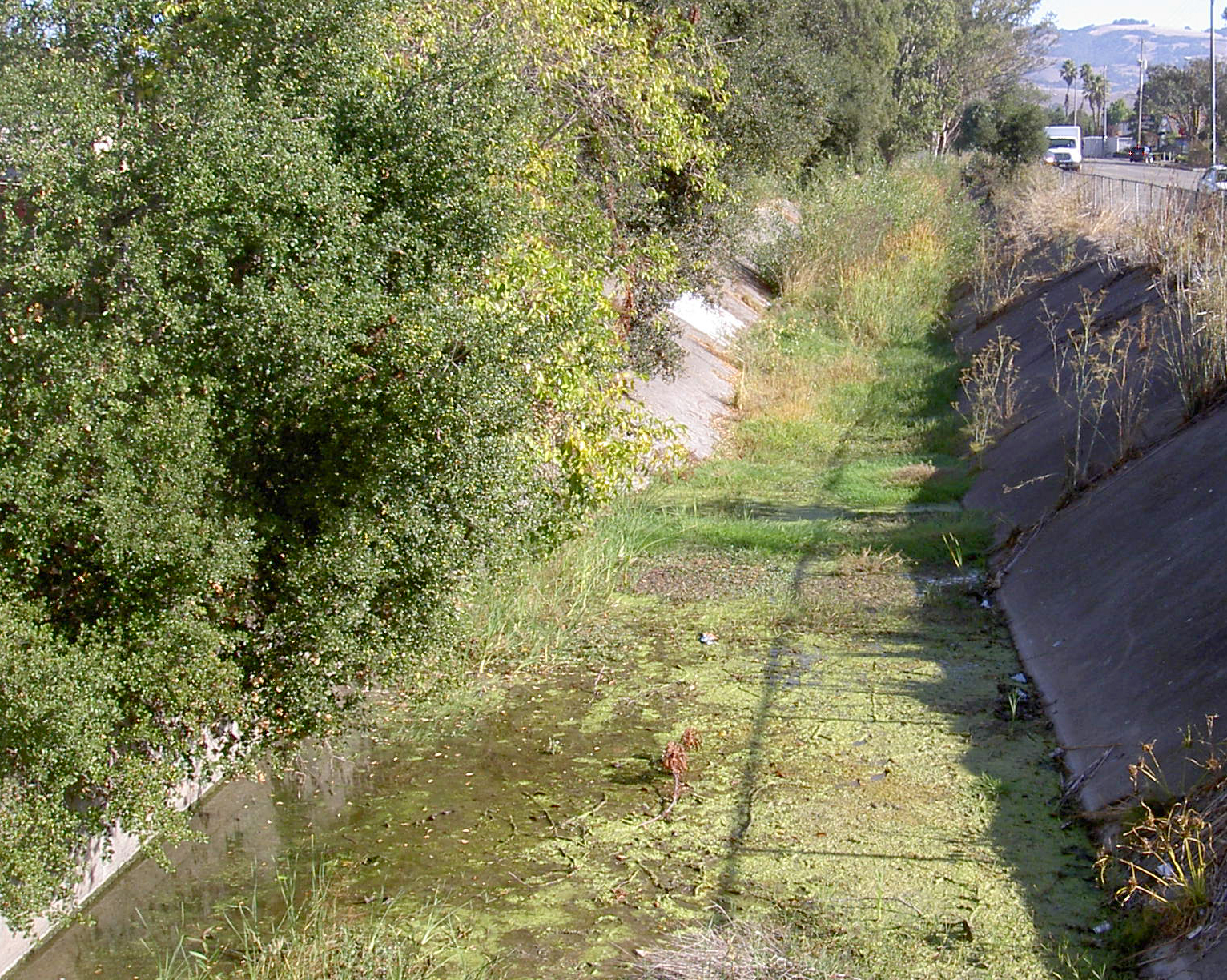
- channelized section in dry season

- Location of the mouth in California

Location
- Country: United States
- State: California
- Region: Sonoma County
- City: Petaluma, California

Physical characteristics
- Source: Sonoma Mountain
  - location: 7 mi (11 km) north of Petaluma, California
  - coordinates: 38°19′19″N 122°35′3″W
- Mouth: Petaluma River
  - location: Petaluma, California
  - coordinates: 38°14′43″N 122°38′19″W

Basin features
- Tributaries
  - left: East Washington Creek

Washington Creek is a southward-flowing stream in Sonoma County, California, United States which enters the city of Petaluma and discharges to the Petaluma River.

== Course ==
Washington Creek rises on the west flank of Sonoma Mountain and descends to the southwest. It crosses under Adobe Road just north of East Washington Street, then parallels East Washington Street through Rooster Run Golf Club and into suburban Petaluma, crossing under Sonoma Mountain Parkway and Maria Drive. After East Washington Creek enters from the east the creek continues southwestward, passing under North McDowell Parkway and U.S. 101. Emerging from the U.S. 101 interchange, the creek flows westward, crossing under Madison Street and Holly Lane to enter the Petaluma River just north of the Payran Street bridge.

== Habitat and pollution ==
On March 7, 2000, a Sonoma Mountain dairy rancher pleaded "no contest" to charges that in 1999 he dumped 732,000 US gal (2,770 m^{3}) of manure and urine into Washington Creek. This was reportedly the first time a Sonoma County dairy farmer had faced fines stemming from criminal charges in a creek pollution case.

== See also ==
- List of watercourses in the San Francisco Bay Area
- Lynch Creek
