= Neils Island =

Island in California

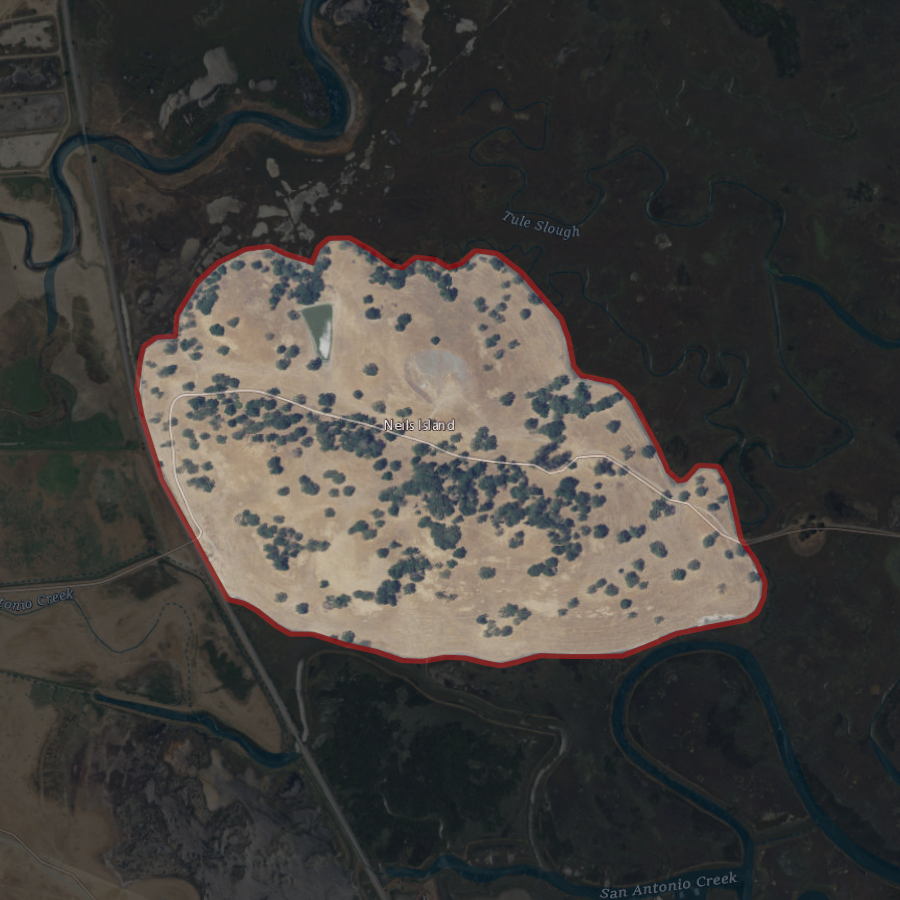
- USGS aerial imagery of Neils Island

- Location within San Francisco Bay Area Location within California Location within the United States

Geography
- Location: Northern California
- Coordinates: 38°11′27″N 122°34′41″W
- Adjacent to: Petaluma River
- Highest elevation: 82 ft (25 m)

Administration
- United States
- State: California
- County: Sonoma

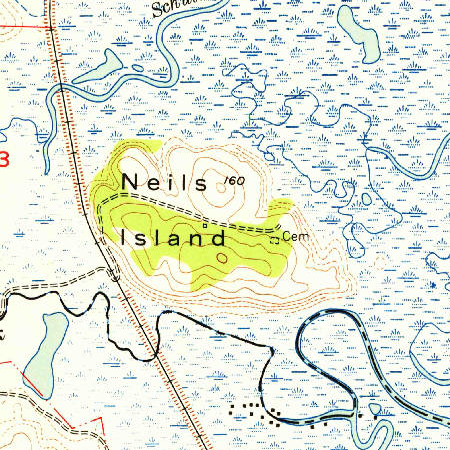
Neils Island as it appears in a 1954 USGS topographic map.

Neils Island (sometimes called Neil Island) is a former island in Sonoma County, California, close to (and formerly surrounded by wetlands of) the Petaluma River, upstream of San Pablo Bay (an embayment of San Francisco Bay). Its coordinates are 38°11′27″N 122°34′41″W, and the United States Geological Survey measured its elevation as 82 ft (25 m) in 1981. It appears in a 1954 USGS map of the region.
