= Lichau Creek =

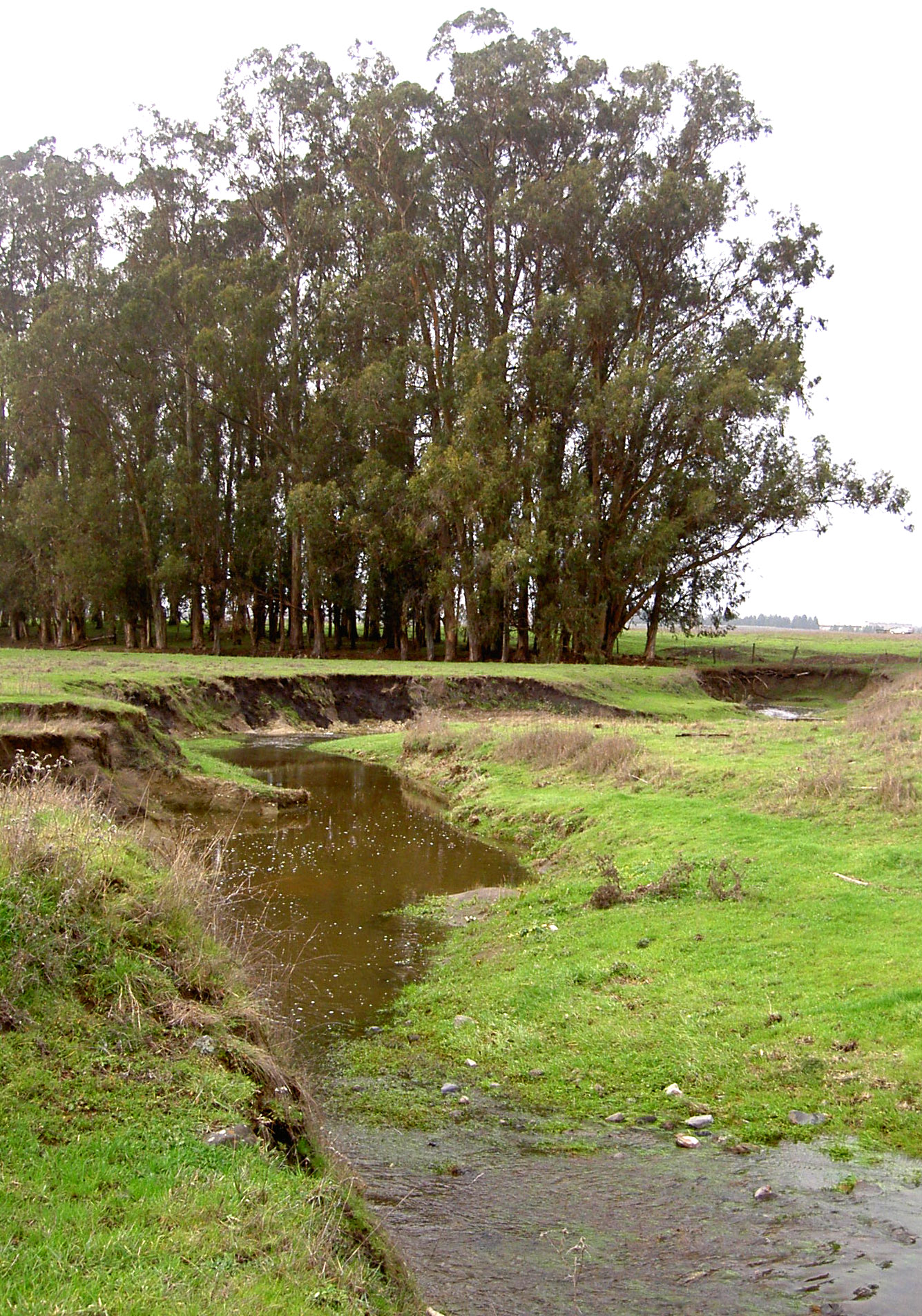
- Lichau Creek and a stand of eucalyptus

- Location of the mouth of Lichau Creek in California

Location
- Country: United States
- State: California
- Region: Sonoma County
- City: Penngrove, California

Physical characteristics
- Source: Sonoma Mountain
  - location: 7 mi (11 km) north of Petaluma, California
  - coordinates: 38°19′47″N 122°35′38″W
  - elevation: 1,725 ft (526 m)
- Mouth: Petaluma River
  - location: 4 mi (6.4 km) northwest of Petaluma, California
  - coordinates: 38°16′27″N 122°40′39″W
  - elevation: 30 ft (9.1 m)
- Length: 8.9 mi (14.3 km)

Basin features
- Tributaries
  - left: Willow Brook

Lichau Creek is an 8.9-mile-long (14.3 km) southwest-flowing stream in Sonoma County, California, United States, which flows through the town of Penngrove and discharges into the Petaluma River.

The original name of the creek is O'Hara Creek and is named after the settler, John O'Hara, who purchased and owned the land through which the creek flows. O'Hara was born in 1833 in County Sligo, Ireland and settled in Penngrove sometime between 1852 and 1857 and died in 1911 at the age of 78 years. The October 26, 1904, Santa Rosa Republican refers to this creek as O'Hara Creek.

== Course ==
The creek springs from the western side of Sonoma Mountain between Copeland Creek and Lynch Creek. Descending initially to the west, it crosses under Sonoma Mountain Road and passes north of Stony Butte. After crossing East Railroad Avenue and Petaluma Hill Road, it flows under the Northwestern Pacific Railroad tracks. It immediately bends southward and parallels the tracks through Penngrove, crossing Adobe Road and Main Street.

On the northern outskirts of Petaluma, it crosses Ely Road and turns southwestward, crossing Old Redwood Highway, the North McDowell Boulevard Extension, U.S. 101, and Stony Point Road to reach the Petaluma River.

== Flora and fauna ==
A 1968 survey of Lichau Creek found algae, duckweed, cattails, dragonflies, dipterous insects, caddisflies, frogs, steelhead trout, and sticklebacks living in the creek.

== Bridges ==
At least three bridges span the creek:

- Petaluma Hill Road crosses 0.1 miles (0.2 km) north of Old Redwood Highway on a 49-foot (15 m) concrete continuous tee beam built in 1920 and reconstructed in 1976.
- East Railroad Avenue crosses 0.1 miles (0.2 km) east of Petaluma Hill Road on a 42-foot (13 m) concrete culvert built in 1970.
- Adobe Road crosses 0.08 miles (0.1 km) east of Old Redwood Highway on a 24-foot (7 m) concrete tee beam built in 1929.

== See also ==
- List of watercourses in the San Francisco Bay Area
