= Penngrove, California =

Penngrove
- Census-designated place
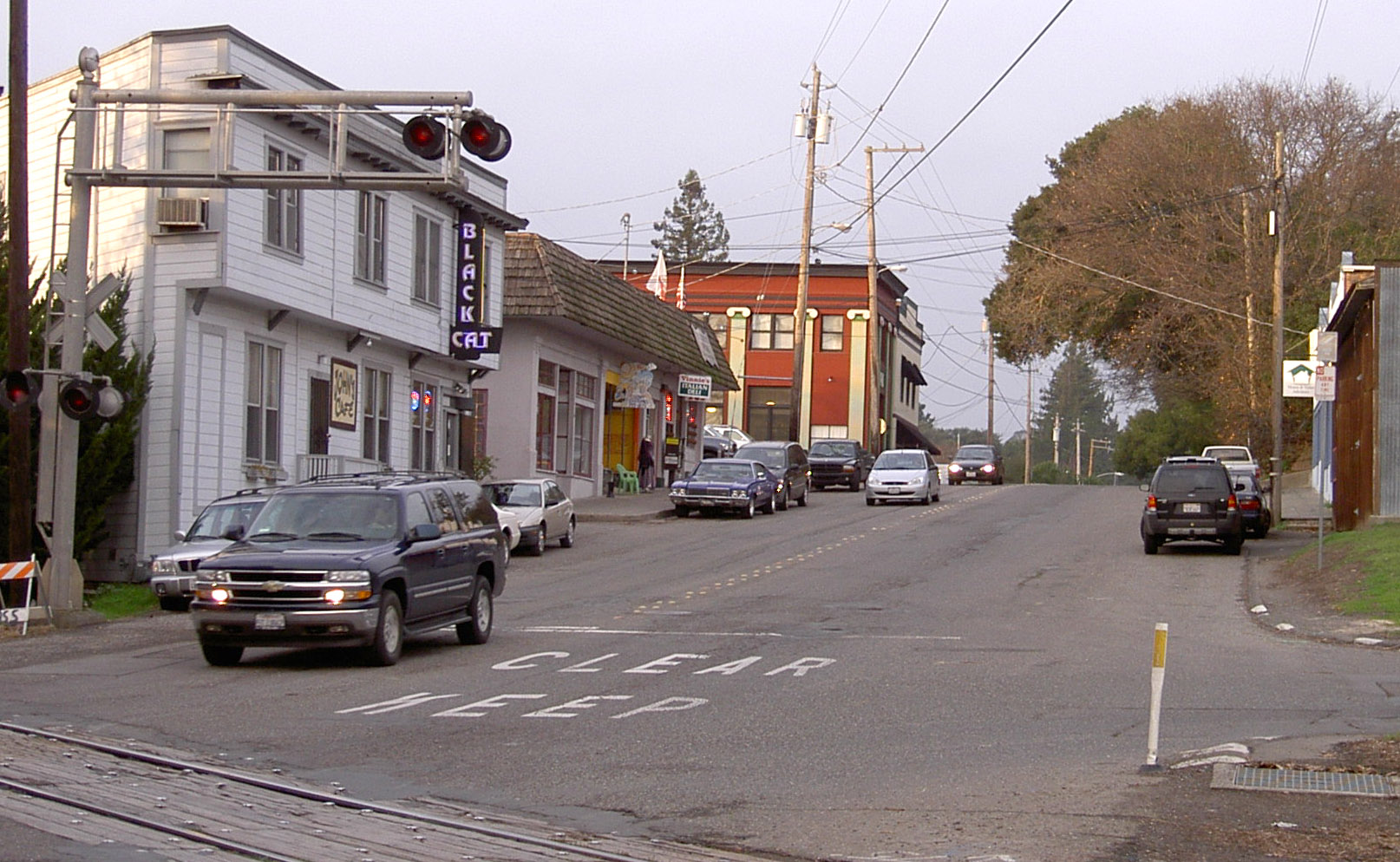
- Main Street in Penngrove

- Location in the state of California Penngrove (the United States)
- Coordinates: 38°17′59″N 122°40′0″W
- Country: United States
- State: California
- County: Sonoma

Area
  - Total: 4.034 sq mi (10.447 km^{2})
  - Land: 4.034 sq mi (10.447 km^{2})
  - Water: 0 sq mi (0 km^{2}) 0%
- Elevation: 85 ft (26 m)

Population (2020)
  - Total: 2,637
  - Density: 653.8/sq mi (252.4/km^{2})
- Time zone: UTC−8 (Pacific)
  - Summer (DST): UTC−7 (PDT)
- ZIP code: 94951
- Area code: 707
- FIPS code: 06-56476
- GNIS feature IDs: 230491, 2583110

Penngrove is a census-designated place (CDP) in Sonoma County, California, United States, situated between the cities of Petaluma and Cotati, at the foot of the western flank of Sonoma Mountain. It is part of the North Bay subregion of the San Francisco Bay Area. The population was 2,637 at the 2020 census.

The area is the site of a historic grove called Penn's Grove; it was formerly a freight station on the Northwestern Pacific Railroad and a center of egg and chicken farming.

== Geography ==
Penngrove's downtown consists of Main Street, a 0.3-mile (0.48 km) street linking Old Redwood Highway to Adobe Road. Penngrove School is located at the corner of Adobe Road, where Main Street becomes Petaluma Hill Road.

Lichau Creek flows southward through the town, paralleling the railway. The creek feeds into the Petaluma River, which flows to San Pablo Bay.

Due to the Sonoma Mountain's ancient volcanism, Penngrove is rich with obsidian and petrified wood. Its soil is unique, composed mainly of clay-like adobe, which has been used for centuries as building material. A prime example of adobe architecture is the Rancho Petaluma Adobe, a State Historic Park in nearby Petaluma.

Penngrove enjoys a mild Mediterranean climate.

According to the United States Census Bureau, the CDP covers an area of 4 square miles (10.4 km^{2}), all land.

== Demographics ==
Historical population
Census	Pop.	Note	%±
2010	2,522		—
2020	2,637		4.6%
U.S. Decennial Census; 1860–1870 1880-1890; 1900 1910 1920; 1930 1940 1950; 1960 1970 1980; 1990 2000 2010; 2020

Penngrove first appeared as a census designated place in the 2010 U.S. census.

=== Racial and ethnic composition ===
Penngrove CDP, California – Racial and ethnic composition Note: the US Census treats Hispanic/Latino as an ethnic category. This table excludes Latinos from the racial categories and assigns them to a separate category. Hispanics/Latinos may be of any race.
Race / Ethnicity (NH = Non-Hispanic)	Pop 2010	Pop 2020	% 2010	% 2020
White alone (NH)	2,067	1,921	81.96%	72.85%
Black or African American alone (NH)	17	22	0.67%	0.83%
Native American or Alaska Native alone (NH)	15	20	0.59%	0.76%
Asian alone (NH)	52	61	2.06%	2.31%
Native Hawaiian or Pacific Islander alone (NH)	1	10	0.04%	0.38%
Other race alone (NH)	2	17	0.08%	0.64%
Mixed race or Multiracial (NH)	76	144	3.01%	5.46%
Hispanic or Latino (any race)	292	442	11.58%	16.76%
Total	2,522	2,637	100.00%	100.00%

=== 2020 census ===
As of the 2020 census, Penngrove had a population of 2,637 and a population density of 653.7 inhabitants per square mile (252.4/km^{2}).

The age distribution was 18.9% under the age of 18, 6.0% aged 18 to 24, 20.7% aged 25 to 44, 29.8% aged 45 to 64, and 24.6% who were 65 years of age or older. The median age was 49.2 years. For every 100 females, there were 98.0 males, and for every 100 females age 18 and over there were 92.7 males age 18 and over.

The census reported that 99.6% of the population lived in households, 0.4% lived in non-institutionalized group quarters, and no one was institutionalized. 84.6% of residents lived in urban areas, while 15.4% lived in rural areas.

There were 1,063 households, of which 25.2% had children under the age of 18. Of all households, 47.5% were married-couple households, 7.3% were cohabiting couple households, 25.9% had a female householder with no spouse or partner present, and 19.3% had a male householder with no spouse or partner present. About 28.8% of all households were made up of individuals, and 13.8% had someone living alone who was 65 years of age or older. The average household size was 2.47. There were 652 families (61.3% of all households).

There were 1,121 housing units at an average density of 277.9 units per square mile (107.3 units/km^{2}). Of occupied housing units, 63.6% were owner-occupied and 36.4% were occupied by renters. The vacancy rate was 5.2%; the homeowner vacancy rate was 0.4% and the rental vacancy rate was 6.5%.

Racial composition as of the 2020 census
Race	Number	Percent
White	1,994	75.6%
Black or African American	22	0.8%
American Indian and Alaska Native	38	1.4%
Asian	62	2.4%
Native Hawaiian and Other Pacific Islander	12	0.5%
Some other race	224	8.5%
Two or more races	285	10.8%

== History ==
The Mexican government granted Rancho Cotate to Captain Juan Castaneda in July 1844 for his military services in the region. The grant encompassed present-day Penngrove, Cotati and Rohnert Park. Cotate Rancho is a part of Vallejo Township which encompasses the plain between Sonoma Mountain and Petaluma Creek, San Pablo Bay, with an east–west line dividing the tract from Santa Rosa Township."

Rancho Cotate was sold in 1849 to Dr. Thomas S. Page of Cotati, and eventually broken up and sold off piecemeal to incoming settlers.

The first European settlers in the Penngrove area were David Wharff, W.J. Hardin, and J.M. Palmer, who arrived in 1852.

In October 1870, the San Francisco and North Pacific Railroad completed the first railroad from Petaluma to Santa Rosa, running through Penngrove.

== Culture ==
Every summer on the Sunday closest to July 4, Penngrove celebrates the 4th of July with a parade sponsored by the Penngrove Social Firemen. On Saturday at the Penngrove Fire Station, located at the corner of Main Street and Old Redwood Highway, the Rancho Adobe Firefighters' Association sponsors a breakfast.

== Education ==
It is in the Petaluma City Elementary School District and the Petaluma Joint Union High School District.

== Name ==
The naming of Penngrove is uncertain; there are three main "histories" of the name's origin.

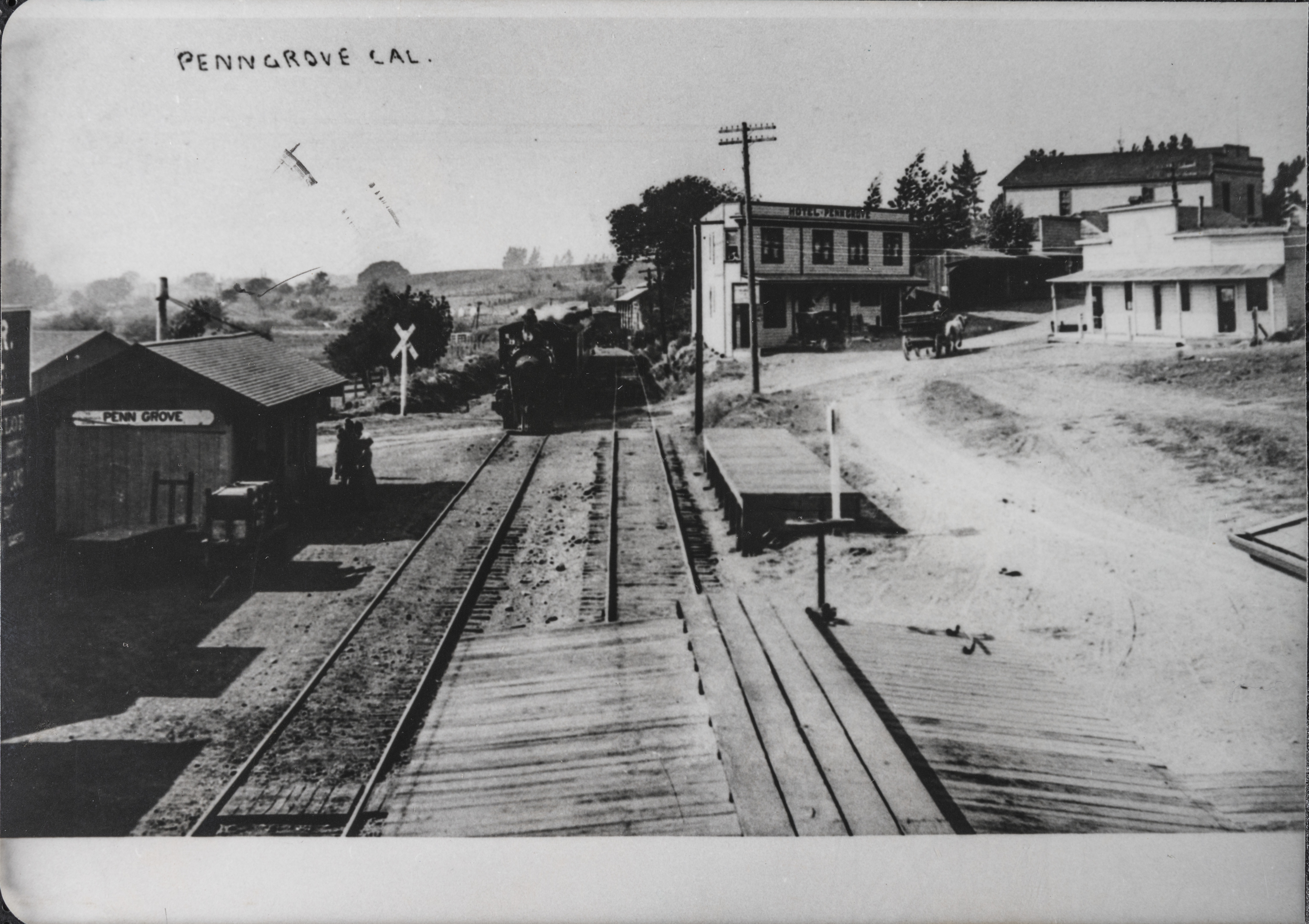
Photograph taken looking northwest along the railroad tracks in Penngrove, next to the former train station and hotel

Ruth Anderson, the famous "Bell-Lady" of Penngrove (who lived on the site of the old schoolhouse on Oak Street), recalls, "In the late 1860s, two brothers by the name of Penn came out from Pennsylvania and bought 80 acres (320,000 m^{2}) of land in this area. They planted the area with olive trees, but when the trees matured it was found that the olives were not edible. The Penn brothers tore out many of the groves, sold the land and moved away. However, while they were here, they named their place Penn's Grove. Later it was changed to "Penn Grove," and still later, because our mail got confused with that of Pine Grove (the former name of Sebastopol), the U.S. Postoffice Department changed the name to one word—Penngrove." (Harris 1980)

Other accounts state that because there was another town with the name of Penn's Grove in New Jersey, this could be a reason as to why the post office changed the name. Others claim that the Woodward family, who came from Pennsylvania, named their property Penn's Grove in honor of their home state.

== Community development ==
A Penngrove chicken house

Along with the chicken and egg industry, Penngrove was a source of basalt paving stones, which were used to pave the streets of major cities in the Bay Area, including San Francisco. Harris notes that 200 men were employed at the three major cobblestone quarries at the end of the 19th century, and that quarry scars can still be seen dotting the hills between East Railroad Avenue and Roberts Road. When the Northwestern Pacific Railroad was completed in 1870, the paving stone industry kept Penngrove station busy. After the turn of the century, Penngrove became the "second largest egg and poultry producing area in the country. Only Petaluma outdid this area" (Harris 1980). Apparently, according to The San Francisco Examiner, chickens paid better than gold mines. To this day, many dilapidated chicken houses dot old farms and country roads in the area.

== Notable landmarks ==
=== Penngrove Community Church ===
One of the oldest buildings in Penngrove, the old Methodist Episcopal Church was built in 1898 at the corner of Formschlag Lane and Petaluma Hill Road. In 1910, the church was moved on wooden rollers to its present location at 9970 Oak Street. The original building now serves as a fellowship hall, while a newer structure, built in 1955–1957, now serves as the main sanctuary. The original structure is still used by Girl Scouts of the USA, Boy Scouts of America, 4-H, and various other community organizations.

=== Penngrove School ===
The first classes were taught in a small building on Peters' Ranch (Harris 1980: 33). In 1876, the first school was built at the southwest corner of Adobe Road and Main Street. It was named the Eagle School after the Eagle Hotel located across Main Street and shown on Thompson's map of Sonoma County (1877). In 1906 after construction of the second Eagle School, the old school was used as a teacher's residence. It was later moved about 50 ft (15 m) south to its current location and reconfigured into an ell. The second Eagle School was built between Main and Oak streets. The original structure no longer exists, and a private home now stands on that property, however, the steps leading to "Eagle School" from Main Street are still visible. Some of building materials were recycled for construction of the Community Center and a small building in Penngrove Park. In 1926 a beautiful mission-style school house was built and named Penngrove School, Eagle District. Penngrove School joined the Petaluma City School District in 1962. In 1963, the present multi-purpose room was constructed and newer wings were developed between it and the older portion of the school. The multi-purpose room was expanded with a stage in 2006. The 1926 school building is now primarily used for offices and the school library.

=== Post Office ===
"The Post Office at Penn's Grove was established on October 30, 1882. A series of name changes occurred because of mail mix-ups with Penn's Grove, New Jersey and Pine Grove (later renamed Sebastopol). In May 1895 the Petaluma paper reported: 'The Penngrove Post Office has had its name changed again and is now officially known by its former and best known title, Penn's Grove.' In 1908 the name was changed back to Penngrove and has remained so since" (Harris 1980). The first Post Office was located in the Edwards Building and was then moved into the Terribilini Building on the East side of Main Street. It was then moved next to Penngrove Market and a new structure for the Post Office was built in the 1980s on Main Street across from Penngrove Market.

=== Fire Department ===
At the turn of the century, three fire chemical carts served as Penngrove's fire protection. The foundation of Firehouse #1 can be found between Penngrove Church and the Old Eagle School lot on Oak Street. "The fire department was established in the fall of 1928. In 1929 the first fire engine was put into service" (Harris 1980). In 1938, the art deco fire house was built on Woodward Avenue, just above Main Street. This structure still bears the title "Penngrove Firehouse." It is a now a private residence. In 1975, the current firehouse was built at the corner of Old Redwood Highway and Main Street, the unofficial entrance to Penngrove. Until the 1990s, a siren placed at the top of the building would sound in order to alert volunteer firefighters of a fire. The siren had a greater than 1.5-mile (2.4 km) radius and could be heard frequently through the hot, dry summer months. This system was replaced by pagers in the 1990s, although the siren remains perched on top of the firehouse. Currently, the Penngrove Firehouse is part of the Rancho Adobe Fire District, along with Cotati and other surrounding communities.

=== Penngrove Community Club House ===
"During World War I, a group of Penngrove ladies met in Evart's Hall to do Red Cross work. After the war they decided they wanted to stay together as a group and have a club house of their own" (Harris 1980: 33). In 1922, after raising funds and materials, Penngrove came together to build the Community Club House. The total cost was $9,000. The building was first named the "Penngrove Social Welfare Club House", but was later shortened to Penngrove Women's Club House. After a fire destroyed portions of the building in the late 1970s and the Women's Club could no longer afford the upkeep, the Penngrove Social Firemen bought the building. It is now used for various community events, such as voting and fundraisers.

=== Bank Building ===
"The Bank Building was built in 1922 for the Central Commercial and Savings Bank. The bank lasted only 2 or 3 years. The bank manager and his family lived upstairs" (Harris 1980: 48).

=== Penngrove Rail Station ===
The Penngrove Rail Station burned to the ground in 1980, and nothing of it survives. The poultry loading docks still exist behind Penngrove Market, adjacent to Penngrove Park, and now house businesses.

== Notes ==
=== Works cited ===
- DeClercq, John H. (1977). History of Rohnert Park "from seed to city". Rohnert Park, California: Rohnert Park, Calif. : City Council – via Gaye LeBaron Collection.
- Harris, Ellen M. (January 1, 1980). Penngrove: A Jigsaw Puzzle of Its Past and Present. Penngrove, California.

=== General references ===
- Thompson, Robert A. (1877). Thos H. Thompson & Co (ed.). Historical Atlas Map of Sonoma County, California (1970 ed.). Mid-Cal Publishers.
- Lightfoot, Kent; Parrish, Otis (2009). California Indians and Their Environment: An Introduction. Berkeley: University of California Press. ISBN 978-0-520-94228-8.
- Torliatt, Lee (June 20, 2001). Golden Memories of the Redwood Empire. Arcadia Publishing. ISBN 978-1-4396-1317-7.
