= Burdell Island =

Island in California

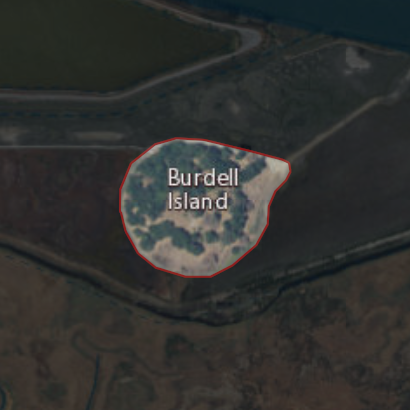
- USGS aerial imagery of Burdell Island

- Location within San Francisco Bay Area Location within California Location within the United States

Geography
- Location: Northern California
- Coordinates: 38°09′22″N 122°33′17″W
- Adjacent to: Petaluma River
- Highest elevation: 52 ft (15.8 m)

Administration
- United States
- State: California
- County: Marin

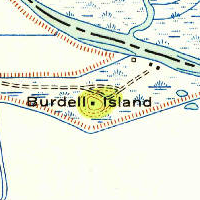
Burdell Island on a 1954 USGS topographic map.

Burdell Island (or Mira Monte) is a former island in the Petaluma River, upstream of San Pablo Bay (an embayment of San Francisco Bay). While it was previously surrounded by water and swampland, it is now surrounded mostly by dry land (although it remains much higher than surrounding land). It is part of Marin County, California. Its coordinates are 38°09′22″N 122°33′17″W, and the United States Geological Survey gave its elevation as 52 ft (16 m) in 1981. It appears in a 1954 USGS map of the region.
