= Black Point Communications Annex =

Coordinates: 38°05′16.7″N 122°30′35.6″W

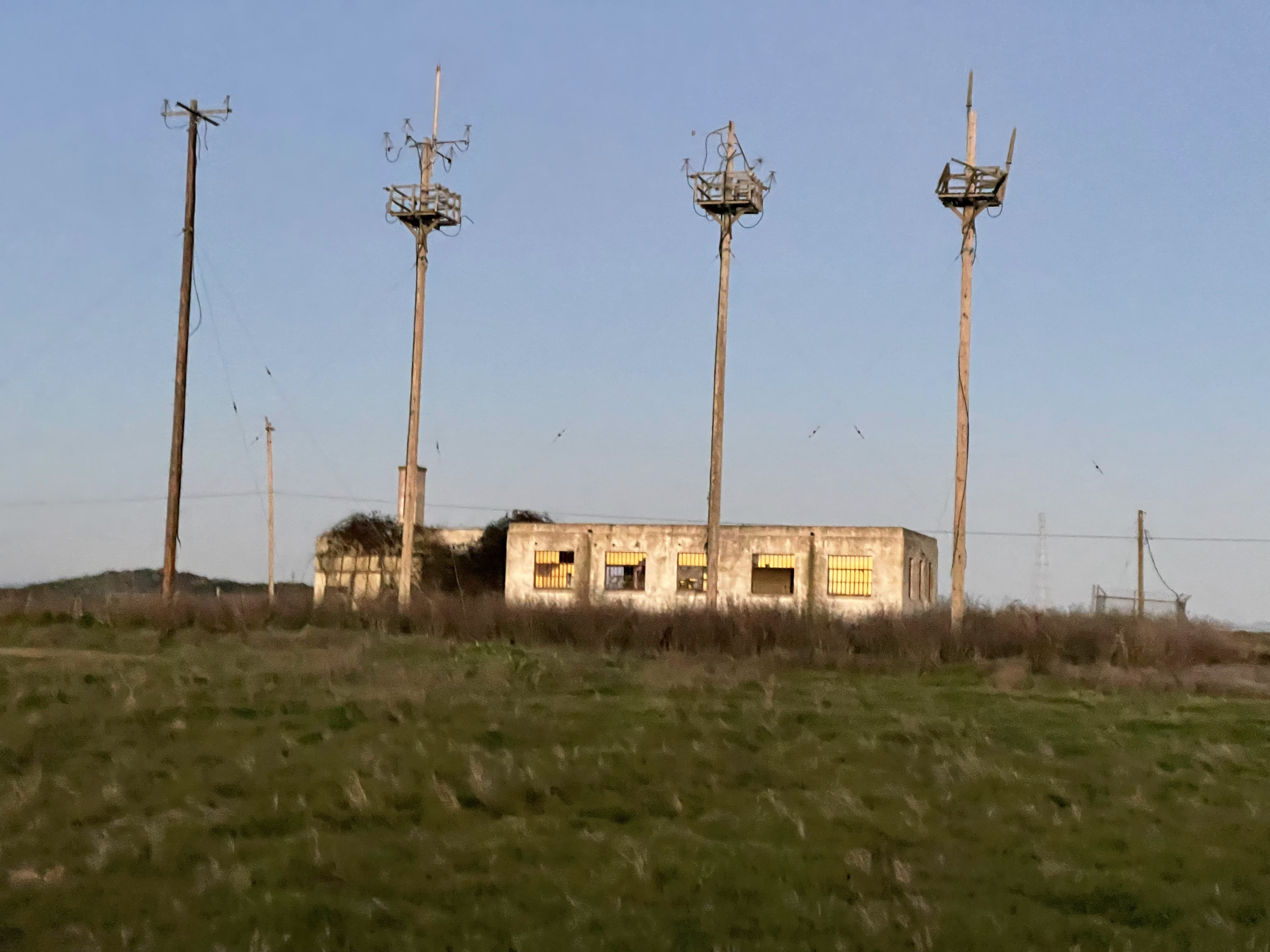
- Black Point Communications Annex Control Room 1501
- Alternative names: Hamilton Field Radio Range Station

General information
- Status: Abandoned
- Location: Novato, California, United States
- Coordinates: 38°05'16.7"N 122°30'35.6"W
- Construction started: 1939
- Cost: 15,341 dollars

Technical details
- Grounds: 135.64 acres (54.89 ha)

The Black Point Communications Annex is an abandoned antenna array and off-site radio communications annex located in Novato, California, 1.5 miles from Black Point, from which it gained its name. It is located 4 miles north of Hamilton Field, a position that was chosen due to its close proximity to a major air force hub.

== History ==
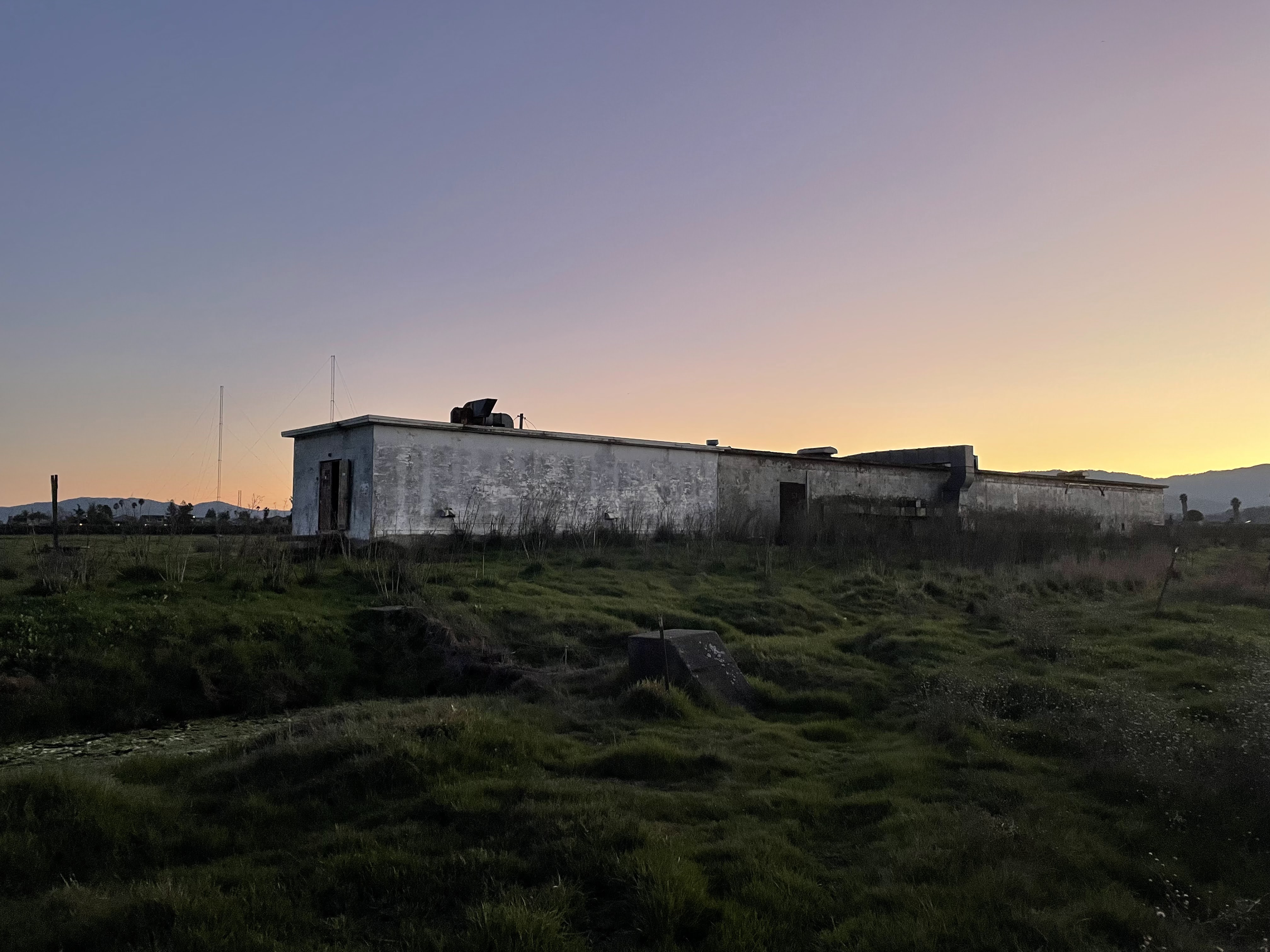
Black Point Communications Annex Control Room 1505

Due to the property having been privately owned, the federal government had to use eminent domain twice to acquire the land, first in 1939 and again in 1957 in order to expand the array. In 1952, both the Hamilton Air Force Base and the Black Point Communications Annex were declared "Permanent Installations" by the United States Air Force, but their usefulness had already begun to decline, and on January 11, 1976, the General Services Administration (GSA) was placed in charge. Eight years later, they sold the former Black Point Communications Annex to the State of California. Many of the buildings are still intact, such as an electrical power station, 2 transmitting building/control rooms, a generator room, and most of the antennae. Some of the other buildings that were built out of wood or corrugated steel are reduced to foundations. The land on which the array is located is overgrown, and visibly different from the fields and pastures that surround it.

== Cleanup ==
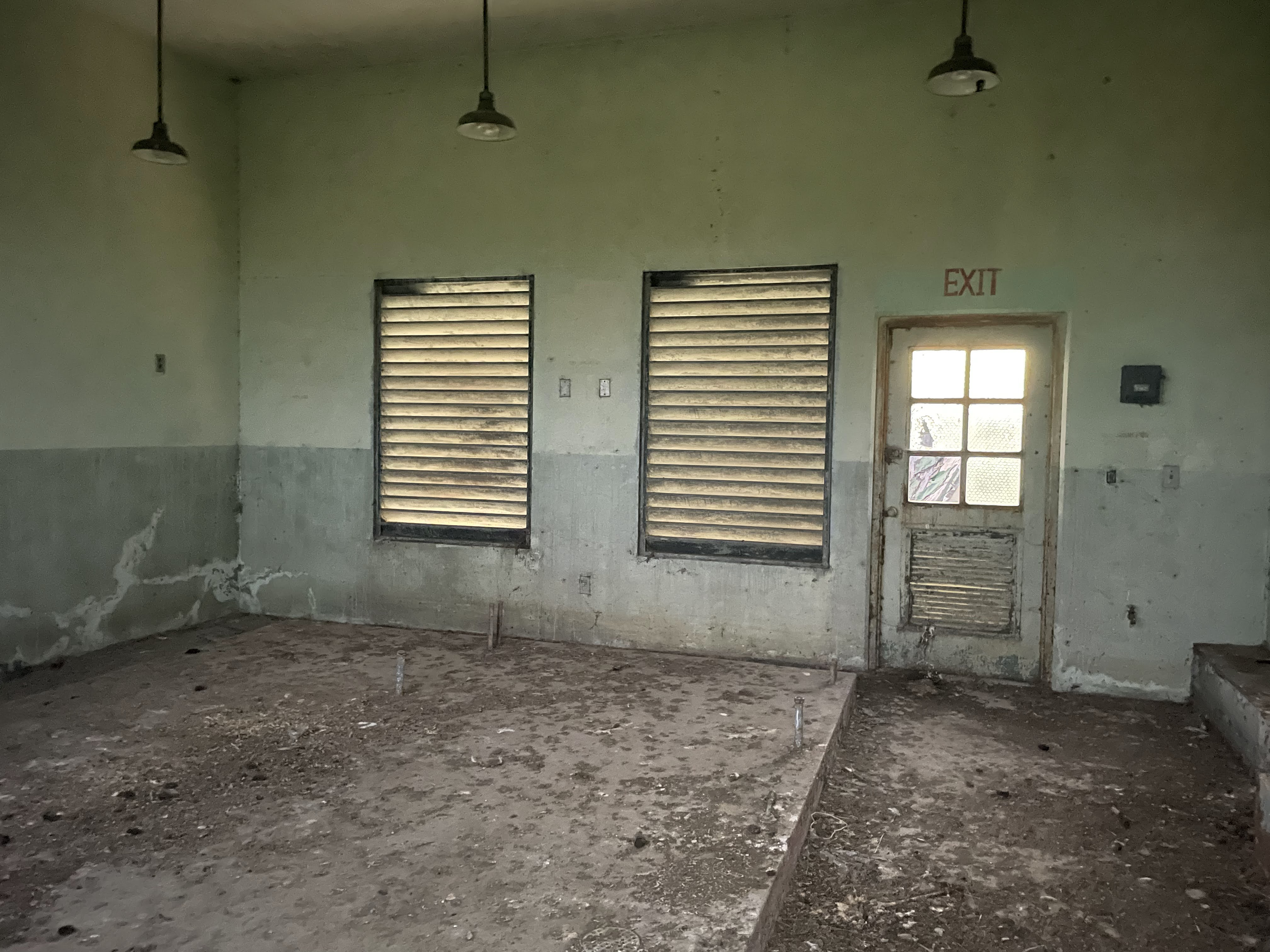
Black Point Communications Annex Control Room 1501 Interior

In total, $478,000 has been spent on the evaluation and cleanup of hazardous sites at the installation. There were multiple severely contaminated underground storage tanks containing hazardous, toxic and radioactive waste, among other hazardous spots. The last clean up was in July 2015, although there still remains a surface water risk due to the array's close proximity to wetlands. The main contaminants were Polychlorinated biphenyls.
