= Petaluma Reservoir =

- Location within California Location within the United States
- Location: Sonoma County, California
- Coordinates: 38°17′50″N 122°34′39″W
- Type: Reservoir
- Primary outflows: tributary of Adobe Creek
- Catchment area: 0.5 sq mi (1.3 km^{2})
- Basin countries: United States
- Surface area: 10 acres (4 ha)
- Water volume: 227 acre⋅ft (280,000 m^{3})
- Surface elevation: 1,024 ft (312 m)
- Islands: none

Petaluma Reservoir is a small, man-made lake located about 5 miles (8 km) northeast of Petaluma in Sonoma County, California, United States. Also known as Lawler Reservoir, its waters are impounded by Lawler Dam, a rock fill dam 40 feet (12 m) high and 1,150 feet (350 m) long that was built in 1910. The City of Petaluma owns the reservoir.

In 1992, the State of California declared the reservoir unsafe in the event of an earthquake. Rather than perform a seismic retrofit of the dam, the City decided to stop using it for water supply.

== See also ==
- List of lakes in California
- List of lakes in the San Francisco Bay Area
