= Day Island (California) =

Island in California

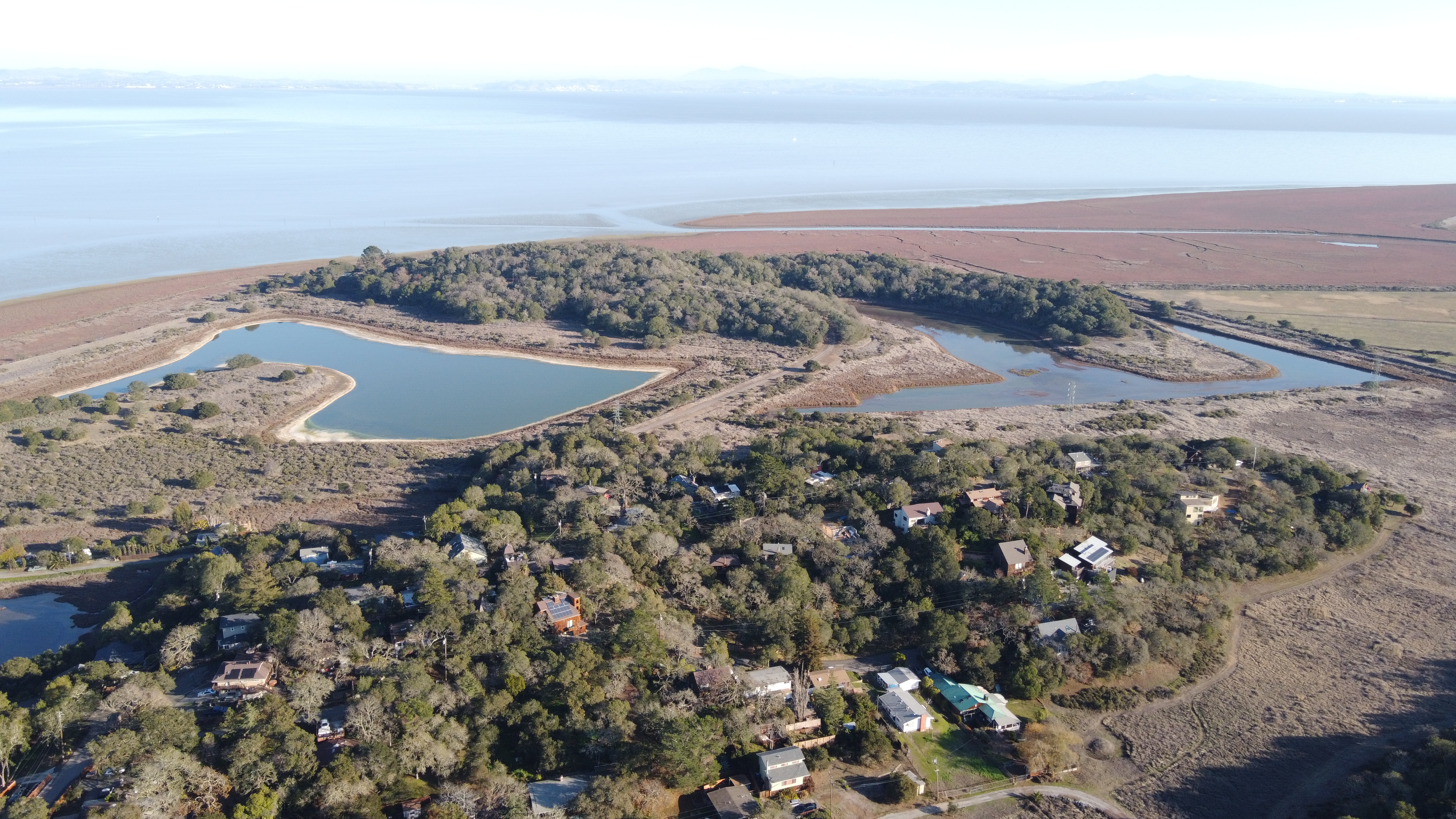
- Day Island in December 2022

- Location within San Francisco Bay Area Location within California Location within the United States

Geography
- Location: Northern California
- Coordinates: 38°06′13″N 122°29′26″W
- Adjacent to: San Pablo Bay
- Highest elevation: 105 ft (32 m)

Administration
- United States
- State: California
- County: Marin

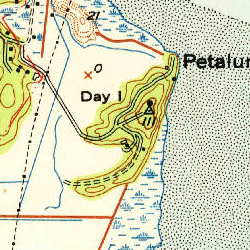
Day Island in a USGS topographic map from 1951

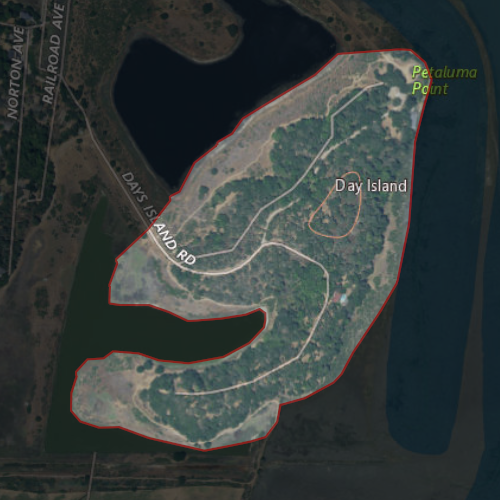
USGS aerial imagery of Day Island in 2021

Day Island is an island at the mouth of the Petaluma River in San Pablo Bay (an embayment of San Francisco Bay). It is part of Marin County, California. Its coordinates are 38°06′13″N 122°29′26″W, and the United States Geological Survey measured its elevation as 105 ft (32 m) in 1981. It appears on a 1951 USGS map of the area, although it appears on maps from as old as 1873. The "1880 History of Marin County" by Alley, Bowen and Co. mentions "a man by name of Day" who "settled on an island in Novato township which has since borne his name" in 1851." To this day, there are still 2 houses on the island, one inhabited and one abandoned. The island is bordered by dirt and two lagoons to the west, and marshlands to the east, although it was once entirely surrounded by either marshland or water.
