= Black Point Railroad Bridge =

Railroad bridge spanning the Petaluma River in California

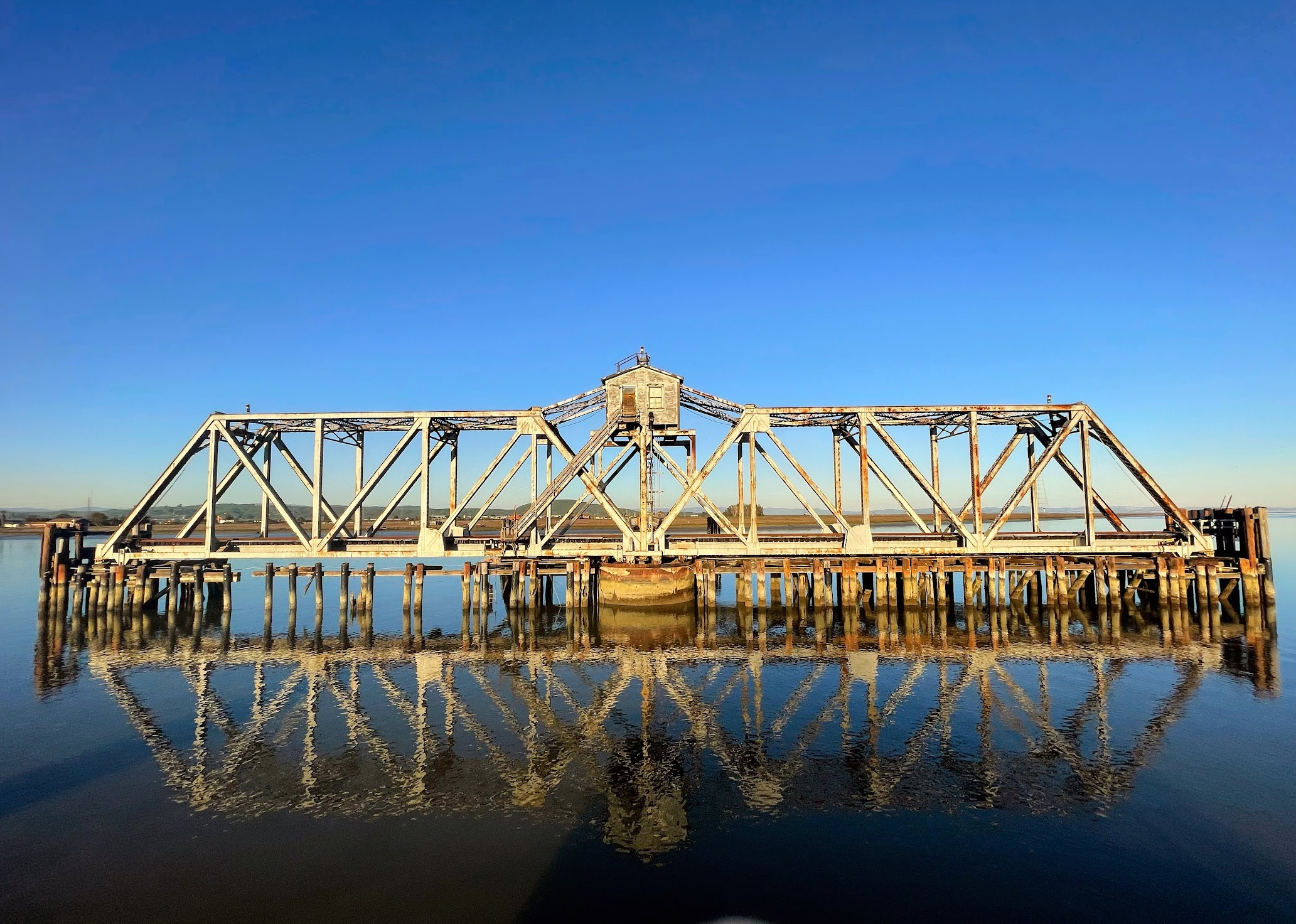
- The Black Point Railroad Bridge
- Coordinates: 38°06′44″N 122°30′07″W
- Crosses: Petaluma River
- Maintained by: North Coast Railroad Authority

Characteristics
- Design: Truss Swing Bridge
- Material: Steel
- Total length: 50 ft (15 m)
- Width: 18 ft (5.5 m)

Rail characteristics
- Track gauge: 1,435 mm (4 ft 8 1/2 in) standard gauge

History
- Constructed by: Northwestern Pacific Railroad
- Opened: 1911
- Rebuilt: 2011
- Replaces: Old Black Point Railroad Bridge

Location
- Interactive map of Black Point Railroad Bridge

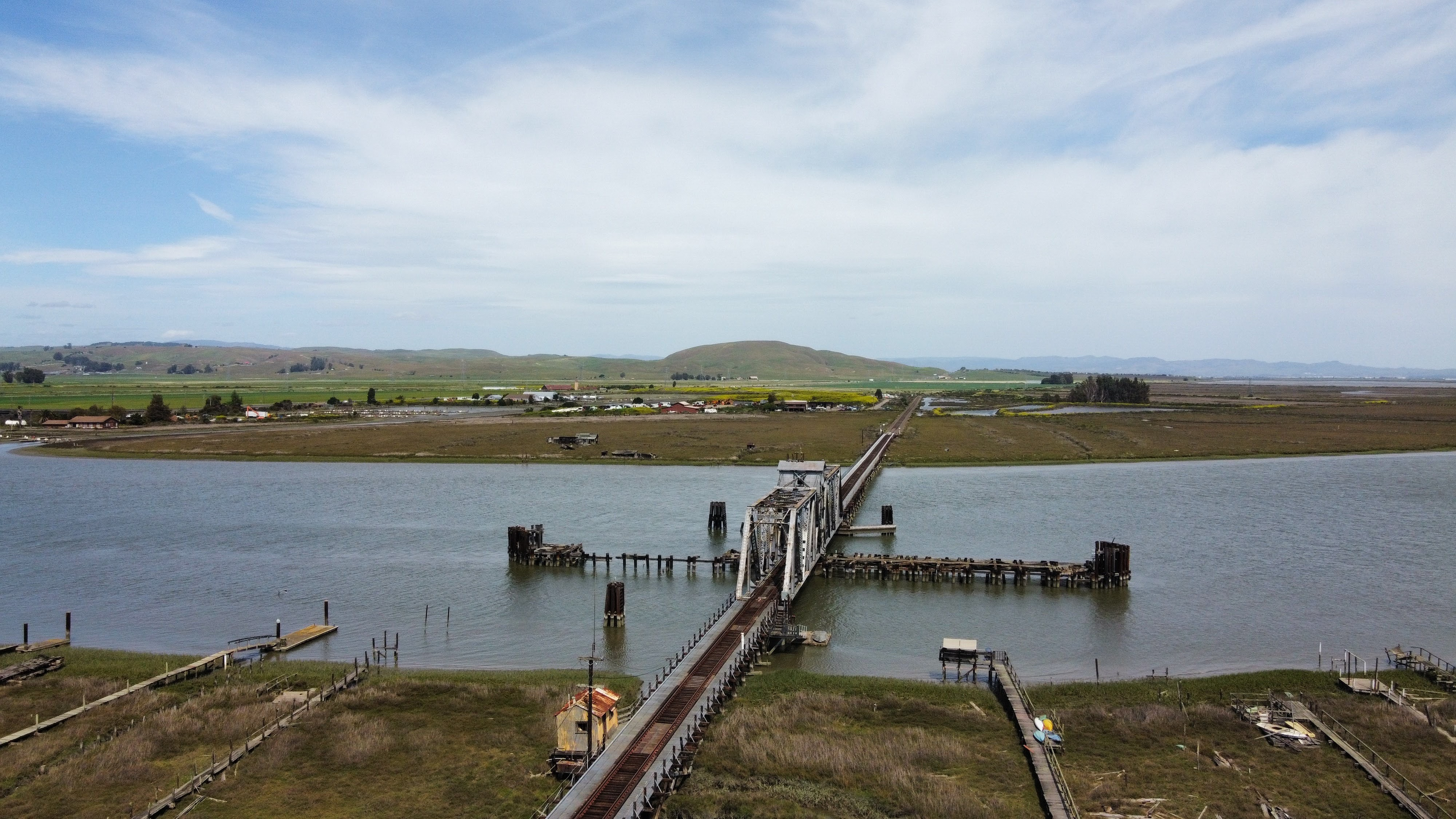
The Black Point Railroad Bridge, turned.

The Black Point Railroad Bridge is a truss swing bridge spanning the Petaluma River, located in Black Point-Green Point, California.

== History ==
A span over the Petaluma River at Black Point was first constructed by Peter Donahue and his San Francisco and North Pacific Railroad (SF&NP) in the late 19th century. The original railroad bridge was part of a branch connecting Ignacio to Sonoma and Glen Ellen. The bridge and the Black Point area became a stopping point, where drawbridge tenders and other railroaders lived and where potential riders could buy tickets. SF&NP merged with Northwestern Pacific Railroad in 1907 and ownership of the railroad branch changed hands.

Northwestern Pacific replaced the original bridge, with construction being completed in 1911. The bridge became publicly owned in the 1990s as the newly formed North Coast Railroad Authority assumed the assets of the former Northwestern Pacific Railroad. The bridge carried rail traffic until 2001, when it was deemed unsafe to use.

=== Lawsuit and repair ===
The bridge was struck by barges multiple times and the Coast Guard determined that it was a safety hazard, no longer meeting river navigation safety requirements. The bridge became the subject of a lawsuit between the Rail Authority and the barge company, with the rail authority seeking compensation for collision damage to the bridge. Quoted in 2005, the barge operator stated: "It's so old that if you touch it, it crumbles." Ultimately, the Rail Authority repaired the bridge by 2011, including repairs to the piles, bracing, caps, steel bearing assemblies and electrical and mechanical systems, bringing the bridge up to modern standards. Rail traffic resumed using the bridge after the repairs.

== Design and use ==
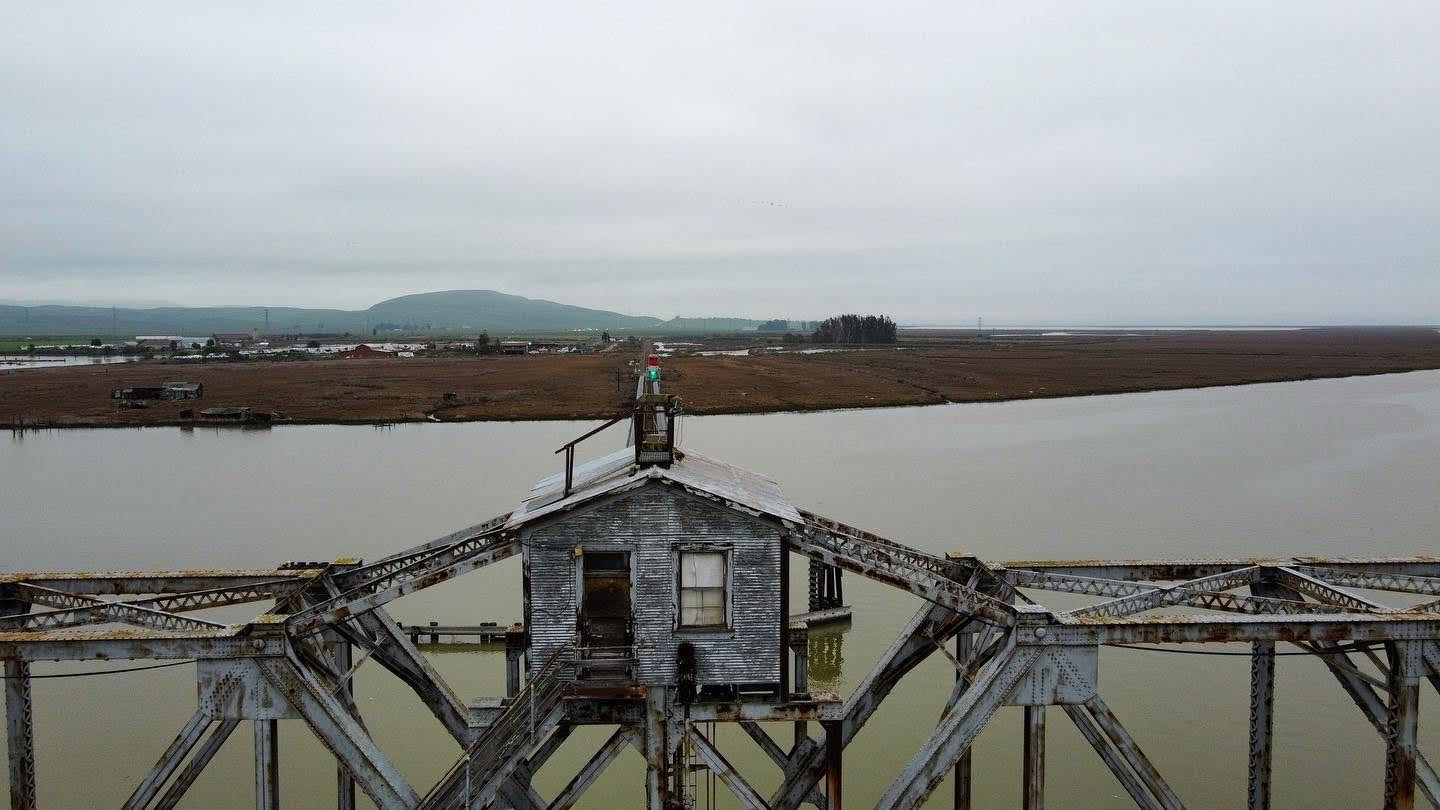
The Operator's House atop the Black Point Railroad Bridge

The Black Point Railroad Bridge is 50 feet long with a deck width of 18 feet, and is a single track center bearing swing bridge. The bridge is flanked by timber trestle approaches on either bank of the river. The west approach trestle is 311 feet long and the east approach trestle is 877 feet long. For 100 years the bridge required an operator to enter the operator house to turn the bridge, however the Rail Authority installed control boxes on either side of the bridge in 2011 to ensure smooth operations as part of upgrading the subdivision. The backup engine for the bridge, an old Ford Model T engine, still resides in the operator's house.

The bridge is vital for freight shippers wanting to connect the North Bay to the Union Pacific main line in Solano County, but does not serve the Sonoma-Marin Area Rail Transit (SMART) commuter rail line linking Sonoma and Marin counties. Trains coming from Schellville use the bridge to bring grain to feederies in Petaluma, and it is for this reason that trains crossing the bridge rarely have any cars other than covered hoppers. The rolling stock for SMART was brought to Sonoma County by way of the bridge.
