= Adobe Creek (Sonoma County, California) =

Adobe Creek Casa Grande Creek
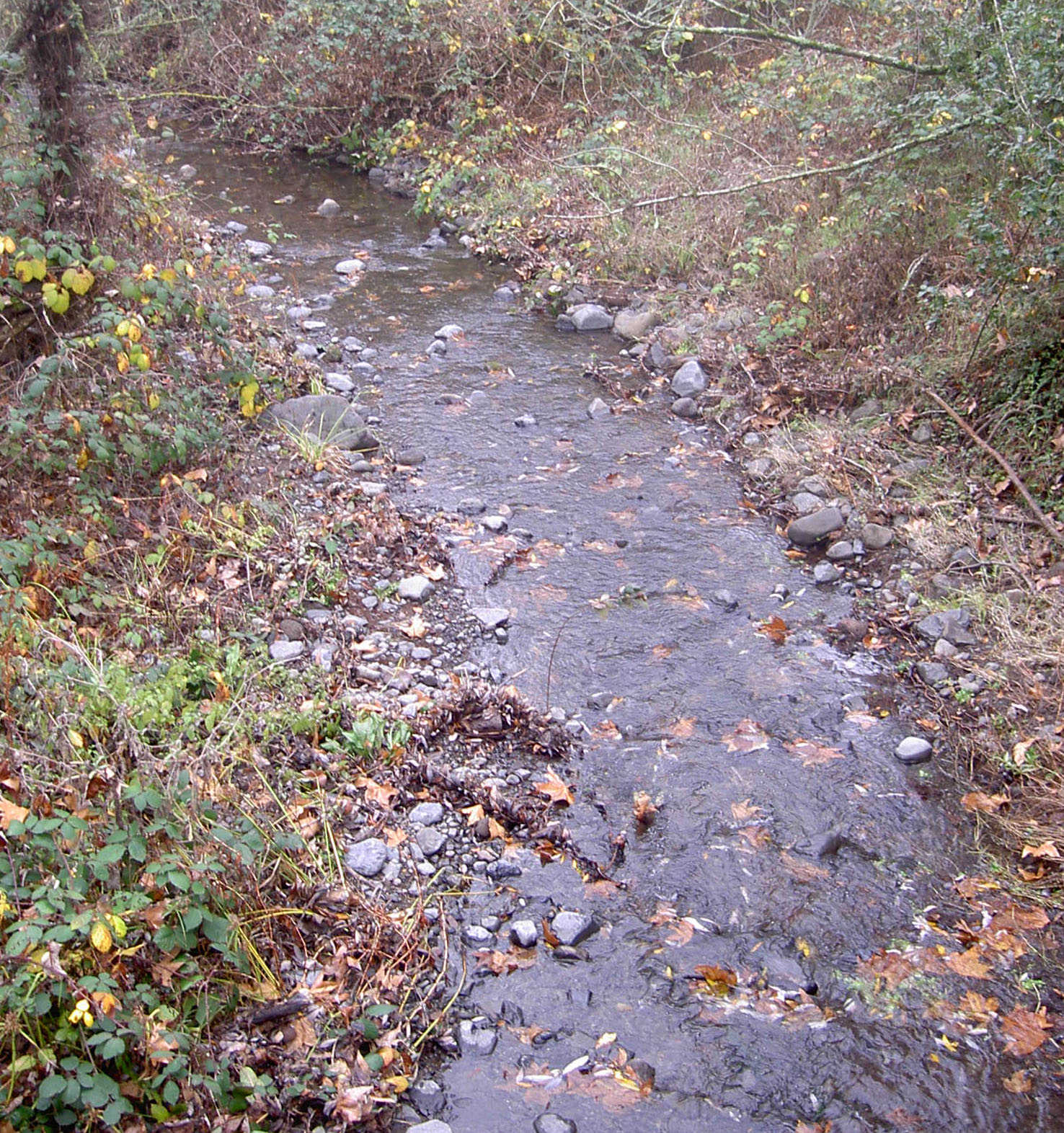
- Adobe Creek at the Petaluma Adobe State Historic Park.

Location
- Country: United States
- State: California
- Region: Sonoma County
- Municipality: Petaluma, California

Physical characteristics
- Source: Sonoma Mountain
  - location: 7 mi (11 km) northeast of Petaluma, California
  - coordinates: 38°19′5″N 122°34′31″W
  - elevation: 2,040 ft (620 m)
- Mouth: Petaluma River
  - location: 2.5 miles east-southeast of Petaluma, California
  - coordinates: 38°13′26″N 122°36′19″W
  - elevation: 3 ft (0.91 m)
- Basin size: 10 mi^{2} (26 km^{2})

Adobe Creek is a southward-flowing stream in Sonoma County, California, United States, which flows past the historic Rancho Petaluma Adobe on the creek's 7.5-mile (12.1 km) course to its confluence with the Petaluma River. It has also been called Casa Grande Creek.

== Course ==
Adobe Creek rises on the west flank of Sonoma Mountain. It descends initially to the south, passing west of Petaluma Reservoir and flowing under Manor Lane. Just east of Petaluma Adobe State Historic Park, it bends toward the southwest and crosses Adobe Road. From there, the creek follows Casa Grande Road, crossing under the road twice as it winds in and out of Adobe Creek Golf Club, crosses Ely Boulevard, and runs along the eastern edge of Del Oro Park. It flows under Lakeville Highway (State Route 116) at milepost 36.19, crosses South McDowell Boulevard, and enters the Petaluma River about 1 mile (1.6 km) southeast of the U.S. 101 bridge.

== Watershed ==
Adobe Creek drains an area of about 10 square miles (26 km^{2}). Its headwaters lie in Lafferty Ranch, a 270-acre (1.1 km^{2}) parcel of land owned by the City of Petaluma since 1995. Lafferty Ranch has been proposed for a wilderness park, but is not accessible to the public. Petaluma Reservoir (which formerly provided water for the city of Petaluma) is located in the Adobe Creek watershed.

== Ecology ==
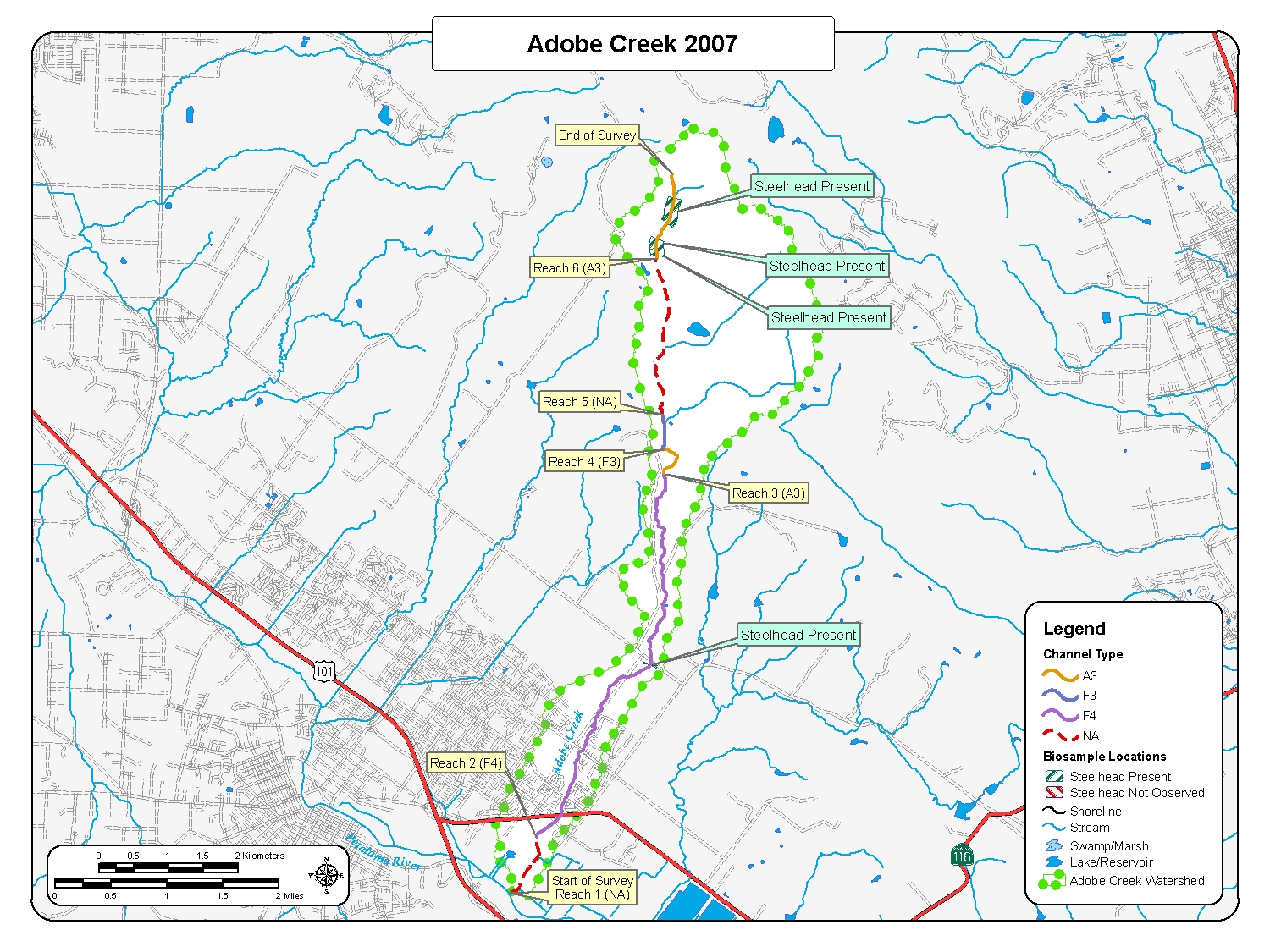
Adobe Creek 2007 Steelhead Trout Biosurvey

In 1983 a high school student group organized by school instructor Tom Furrer founded United Anglers of Casa Grande High School to restore Adobe Creek stream habitat and to see if they could restore steelhead trout (Oncorhyncus mykiss) populations. At that time Adobe Creek was considered a "dead stream" and was a dry, littered riverbed most of the year, although tiny steelhead trout could be found in occasional shallow, drying pools. The students hauled truckloads of trash out of the creek and planted thousands of Coast Douglas-fir (Pseudotsuga menziesii) and willow (Salix) trees to shade and cool the waters. They successfully lobbied Petaluma City Hall officials to re-open Lawler Dam, which was hardly used and kept water from the creek much of the year. In October 1992 Adobe Creek was restored as a free-running stream for the first time in eight decades. The next year, hundreds of steelhead fingerlings were counted in Adobe Creek and the native steelhead population has recovered without restocking. Genetic analysis has proved that the steelhead trout (Oncorhyncus mykiss) that spawn and rear in the Petaluma River watershed are wild, not hatchery, stock. In 1990, five Chinook salmon (Oncorhynchus tshawytscha) returned to spawn in Adobe Creek, the first time documented in a century. In 1993 the organization constructed a salmon hatchery at the high school. In 1996, the creek was the subject of a habitat restoration project which built a step pool near Adobe Road for the benefit of migratory fish. In 2001, students studied the creekbed during low summer flows, and made the scientific discovery that Steelhead fry spend the summer in the creek substrate, re-emerging when flows become reestablished. In 2002, a record 74 Chinook salmon return to spawn along with native Steelhead trout who continue to use the creek annually.

== Bridges ==
At least six bridges span Adobe Creek:

- Manor Lane crosses 0.77 miles (1.2 km) north of Adobe Road on a 32-foot (10 m) concrete slab built in 1960.
- Casa Grande Avenue crosses the creek twice:
  - first (0.25 miles (0.4 km) south of Adobe Road) on a 30-foot (9 m) concrete culvert built in 1970
  - and again (0.4 miles (0.6 km) north of Ely Road) on a 45-foot (14 m) concrete culvert built in 1970 and reconstructed in 1991.
- Ely Boulevard crosses 0.1 miles (0.2 km) southeast of Casa Grande Avenue on a 54-foot (16 m) concrete continuous slab built in 1984.
- Sartori Drive crosses 0.2 miles (0.3 km) southeast of Casa Grande Avenue on a 54-foot (16 m) concrete continuous slab built in 1976.
- State Route 116 crosses at milepost 36.19 on a 33-foot (10 m) concrete continuous slab built in 1954 and reconstructed in 1997.

== See also ==
- List of watercourses in the San Francisco Bay Area
