= San Antonio Creek (Marin County, California) =

San Antonio Creek Arroyo de San Antonio
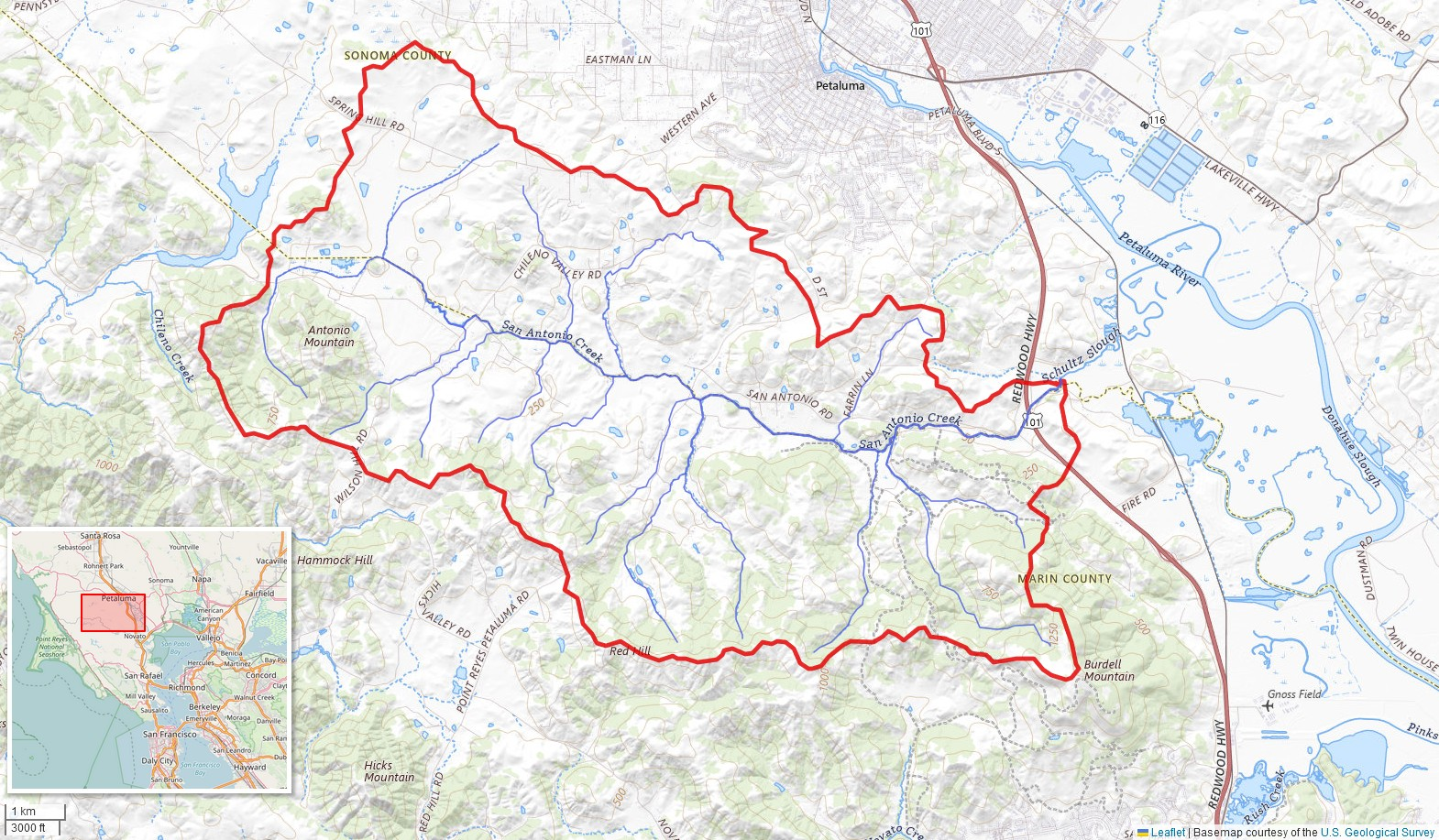
- San Antonio Creek watershed (Interactive map)
- Etymology: Spanish

Location
- Country: United States
- State: California
- Region: Marin and Sonoma counties

Physical characteristics
- Source
  - location: 7 mi (11 km) southwest of Petaluma, California
  - coordinates: 38°10′54″N 122°44′36″W
  - elevation: 790 ft (240 m)
- Mouth: Petaluma River
  - location: west of Lakeville
  - coordinates: 38°9′30″N 122°32′39″W
  - elevation: 0 ft (0 m)
- Length: 17.5 mi (28.2 km)

San Antonio Creek is a northward then eastward-flowing stream in the California, United States, counties of Marin and Sonoma that forms part of the boundary between those counties. It empties into the tidal portion of the Petaluma River.

== History ==
Two permanent Coast Miwok villages were located on San Antonio Creek: Meleya (southwest of Petaluma, California) and Amayelle.

San Antonio Creek is one of many California places named by the early Spanish colonists after Saint Anthony of Padua, a patron of the Franciscan Order. The creek traverses the Rancho Laguna de San Antonio land grant, dated May 6, 1839 and November 25, 1845, given by Governor Pío Pico to Bartolomé Bojorquez in 1845.

== Course ==
San Antonio Creek springs from the southwest flank of Antonio Mountain in Marin County. Historically, a natural laguna or shallow lake existed at the headwaters of San Antonio Creek, different from the Laguna de San Antonio, which exists to the west at the headwaters of Chileno Creek. The San Antonio Creek headwaters laguna was drained for agricultural purposes sometime between 1860 and 1885. From the headwaters the creek runs north 2 mi (3.2 km) into Chileno Valley. Turning east-southeast, it begins to define the county line. It passes under Chileno Valley Road and Point Reyes-Petaluma Road, then parallels San Antonio Road eastward to U.S. 101. It crosses under U.S. 101 where it was diverted around 1930 to the Schultz Slough and the Petaluma River. This diversion is 5.2 miles (8.4 km) upstream from its historical connection to the San Antonio Slough just west of Hog Island in the wetlands south of Petaluma, California. The diversion upstream lowered the creek's gradient, contributing to aggradation of sediments in the lower reaches.

== Ecology ==
San Antonio Creek was historically perennial in its lower reaches and perhaps for most of its length. Up until the mid-1900s, steelhead trout were fairly common in the watershed. Although steelhead were seen in 2000, they appear to be extinct from the watershed. California roach and threespine stickleback, which commonly co-exist with steelhead, are still found.

The largest striped bass ((Morone saxatilis)) ever landed with tackle and line was caught in 1912 by Charles R. Bond in San Antonio Creek, weighing 87 lb 8 oz (39.7 kg) and 5 ft 9 in (1.75 m) long, according to a photograph in the Marin Rod and Gun Club. A newspaper article in 1909 mentions Charles Bond as catching a 55-pound (25 kg) striper in the "San Antone Slough".

== Bridges ==
The US 101 bridges are each two lanes wide and 120 ft (37 m) long. The northbound bridge was built in 1929 and reconstructed in 1979. The southbound bridge was built in 1947. There is also a bridge at San Antonio Road 0.6 mi (1.0 km) north of U.S. 101; built in 1917, it is a concrete tee beam 101 ft (31 m) long. Marshall Petaluma Road crosses the creek on a 25 ft (8 m) concrete tee beam built in 1929. Point Reyes Petaluma Road crosses on a 102 ft (31 m) concrete continuous slab built in 1964.

== See also ==
- Estero de San Antonio
- List of watercourses in the San Francisco Bay Area
