= Vince Mulroy Wildlife Preserve =

Wildlife Preserve

Vince Mulroy Memorial Woodland and Open Space Preserve
- Black Point Preserve
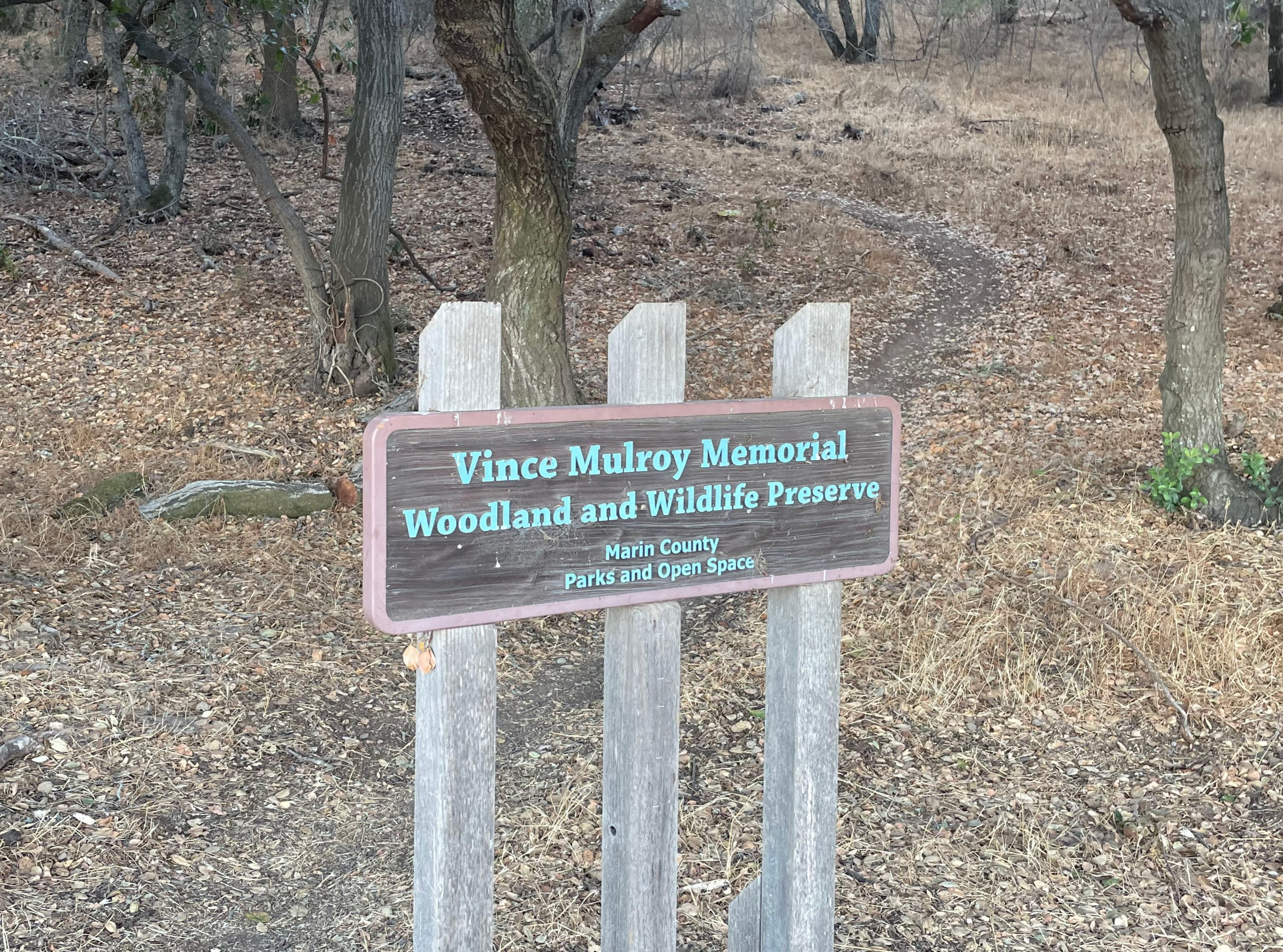
- The Vince Mulroy sign at the base of the hill

- Location within California Location within the United States
- Location: Marin County, California
- Nearest city: Novato, California
- Coordinates: 38°06′01″N 122°30′13″W
- Area: 64 acres (26 ha)

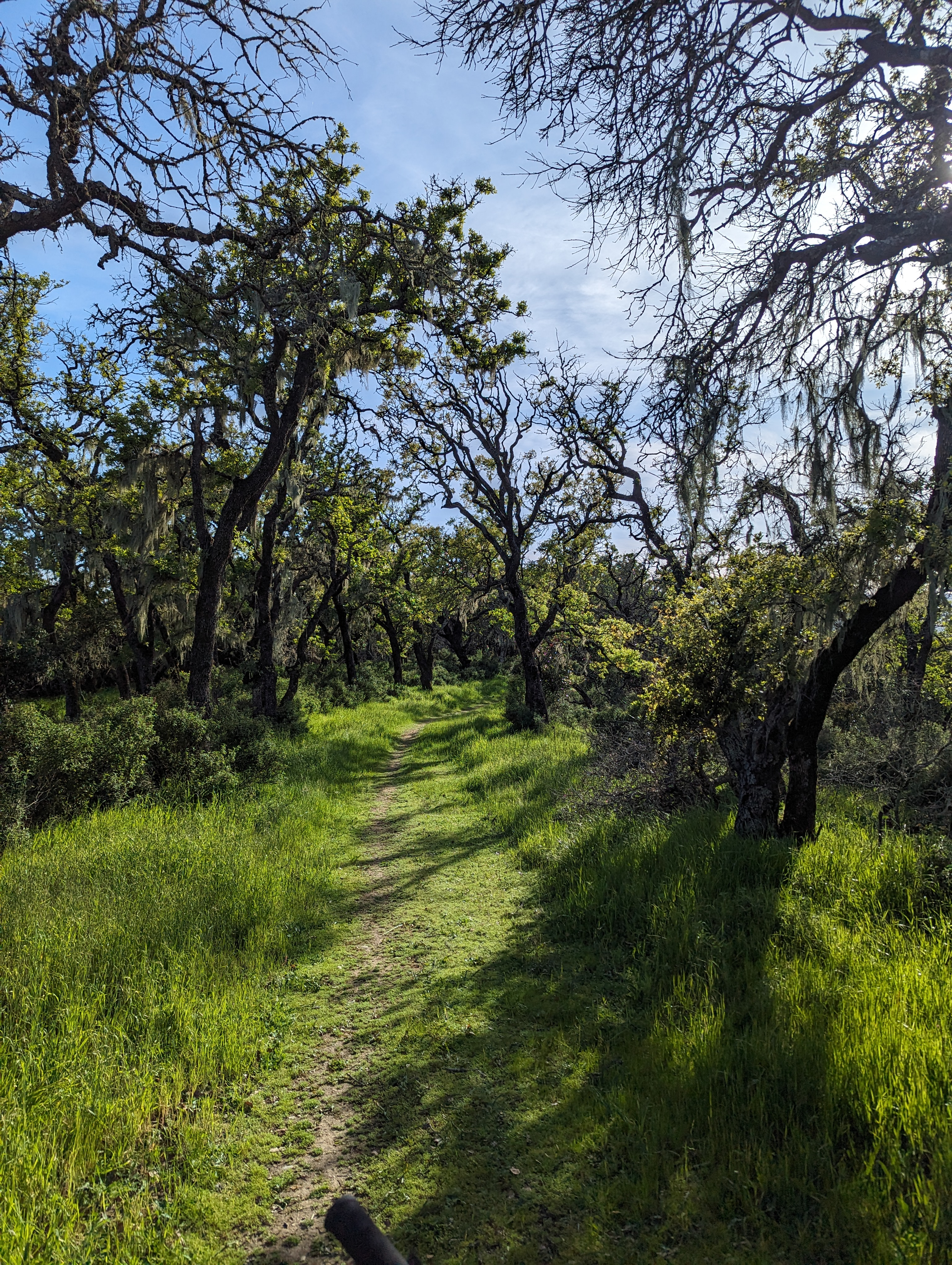
Vince Mulroy Wildlife Preserve in Spring

The Vince Mulroy Memorial Woodland and Wildlife Preserve, formerly known as the Black Point Nature Preserve, is a 64-acre parcel of public land in Novato, California with various hiking trails. The preserve is also partially on the site of the former Renaissance Pleasure Faire, which took place there from 1971 until 1998. When the faire went bankrupt, Vince Mulroy bought the land and donated part of it to become the preserve, with the other part becoming the Stonetree Golf Club. In 2009, the preserve changed names from the Black Point Nature Preserve to the Vince Mulroy Memorial Woodland and Wildlife Preserve.

The preserve is known locally for its large variety of birds, which makes the area a popular place for local birdspotters.
