= Lynch Creek =

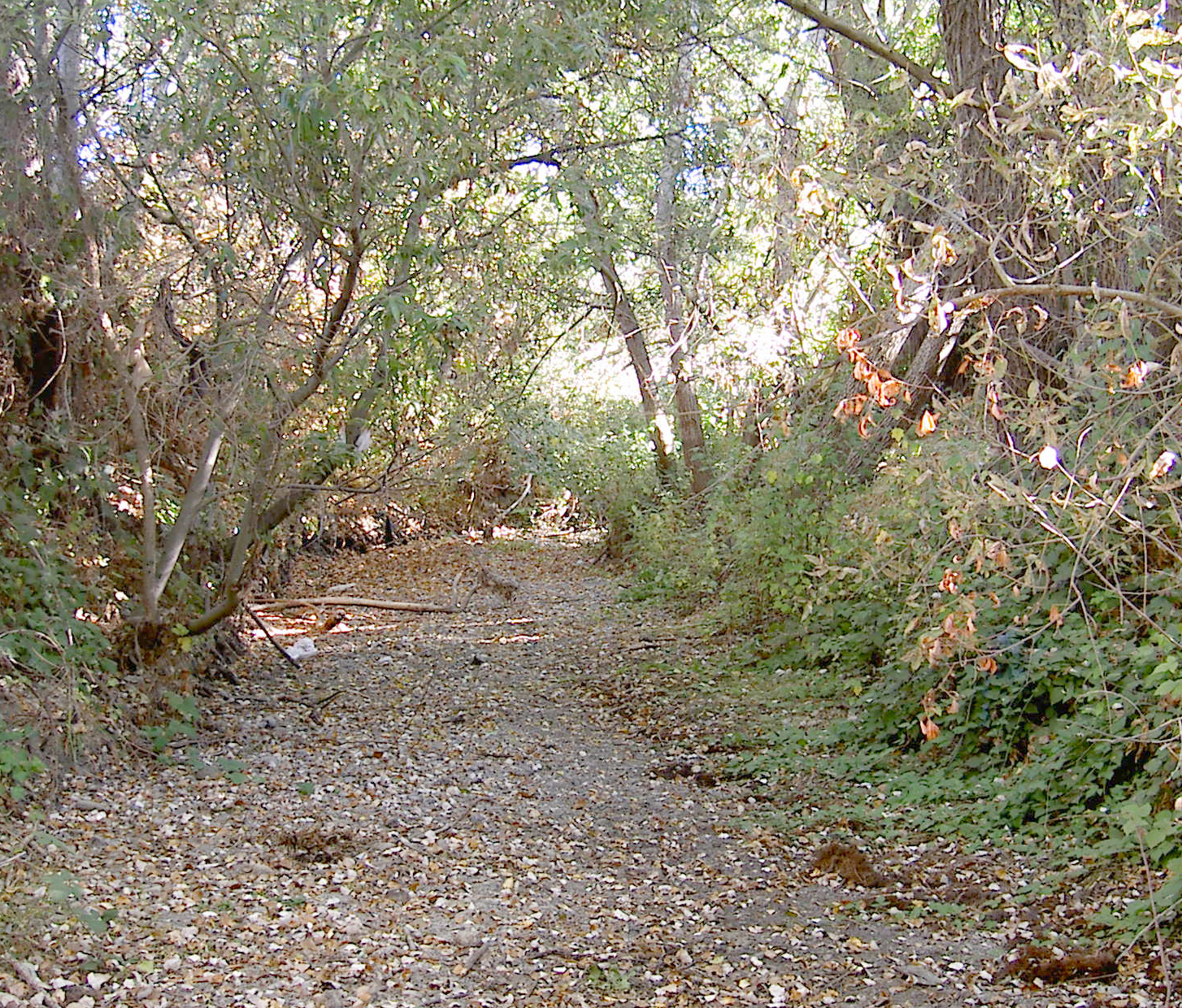
- Lynch Creek during dry season

Location
- Country: United States
- State: California
- Region: Sonoma County
- City: Petaluma, California

Physical characteristics
- Source: Sonoma Mountain
  - location: 7 mi (11 km) north of Petaluma, California
  - coordinates: 38°19′21″N 122°34′58″W
  - elevation: 1,950 ft (590 m)
- Mouth: Petaluma River
  - location: north of Petaluma, California
  - coordinates: 38°14′49″N 122°38′15″W
  - elevation: 30 ft (9.1 m)

Lynch Creek is a 7.1-mile-long (11.4 km) stream in Sonoma County, California, United States which discharges into the Petaluma River.

== Course ==
Lynch Creek rises on the west flank of Sonoma Mountain and descends initially to the west. It flows under Sonoma Mountain Road, then turns southward and roughly parallels Lynch Road for about a mile (2 km). Just north of Adobe Road, it crosses under Sonoma Mountain Road again. After crossing Adobe Road, it flows through Rooster Run Golf Club and enters suburban Petaluma, where it flows southwestward. It crosses Sonoma Mountain Parkway and Maria Drive and follows the western edge of Lucchesi Park to North McDowell Boulevard. From the south side of the Boulevard, it continues southward, passing under U.S. 101 at Sonoma County milepost 5.19 to feed into the Petaluma River near Jess Avenue.

== Bridges ==
Lynch Creek is spanned by several bridges, including:

- at U.S. Route 101, a pair of 79-foot (24 m) concrete continuous slabs built in 1955,
- at Sonoma Mountain Road 0.35 miles (0.6 km) northwest of Adobe Road, a 62-foot (19 m) prestressed concrete tee beam built in 1984, and
- at Adobe Road 3.2 miles (5 km) south of Petaluma Hill Road, a 60-foot (18 m) steel bridge built in 1950 and reconstructed in 1963.

== Ecology ==
Lynch Creek provides habitat for a variety of threatened and endangered species including chinook salmon (Oncorhynchus tshawytscha), steelhead trout (Oncorhyncus mykiss), and the foothill yellow-legged frog (rana boylii).

== See also ==
- List of watercourses in the San Francisco Bay Area
