= Petaluma River =

River in California, United States

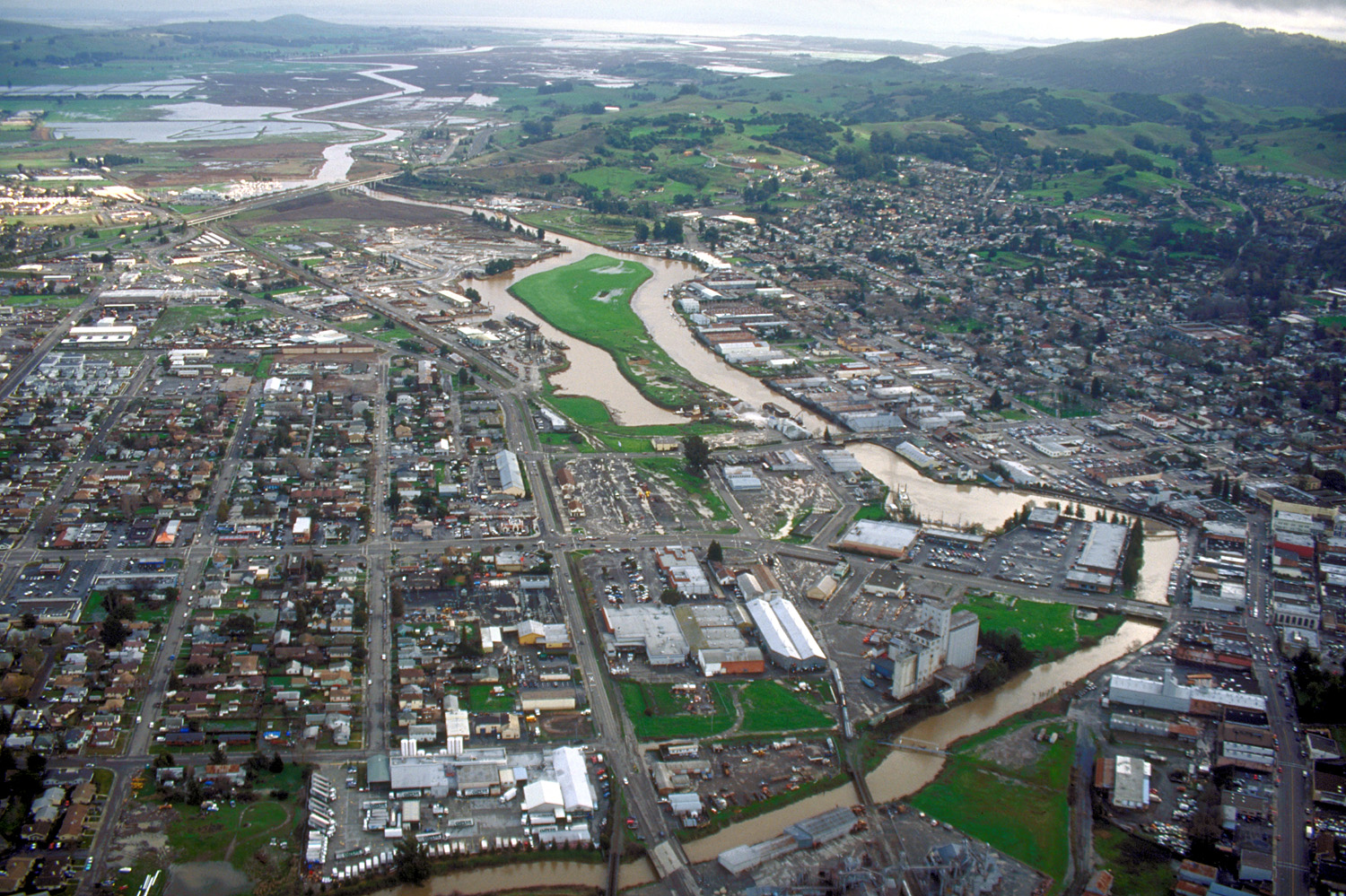
- The river flowing through Petaluma. View is to the southeast.

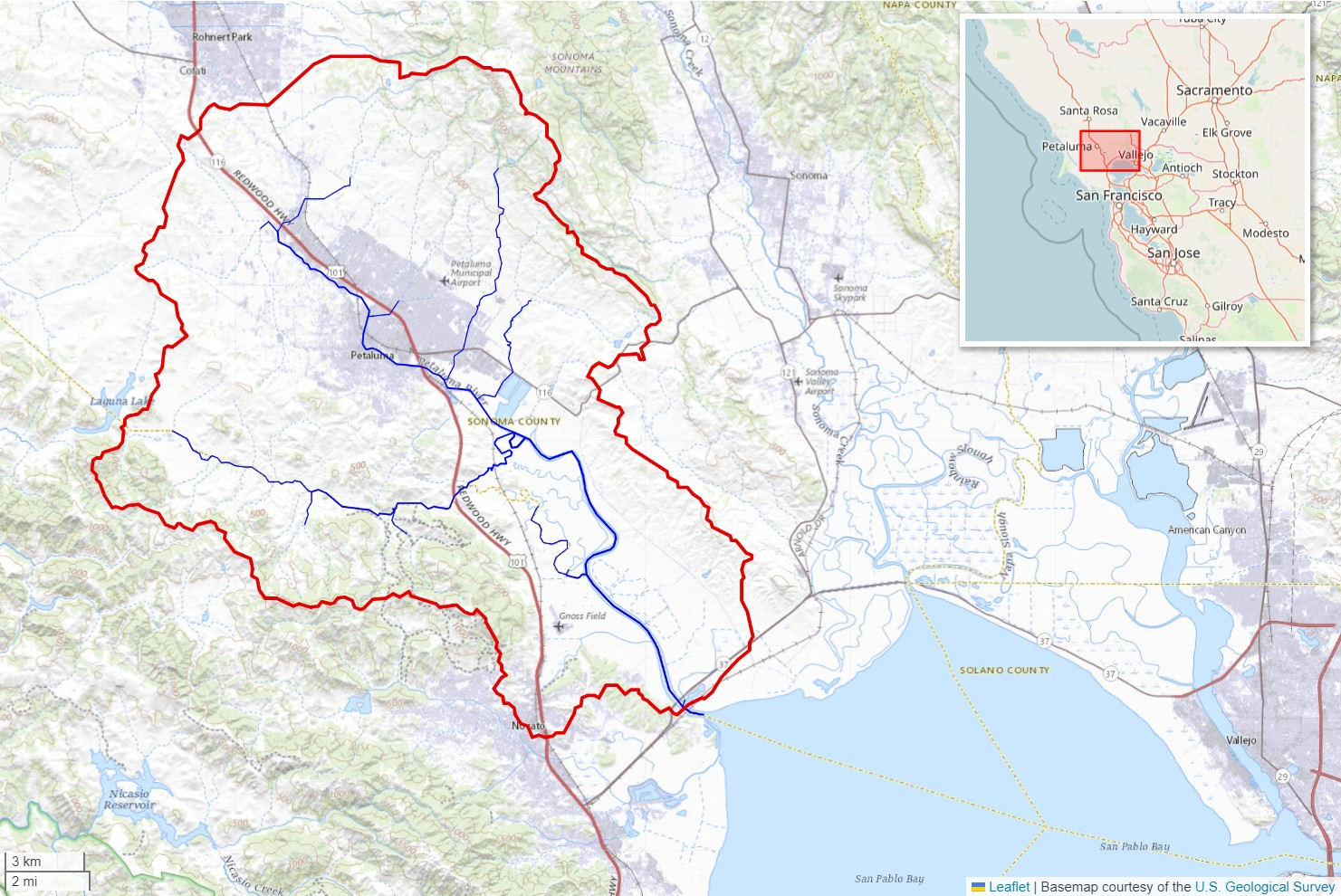
- Petaluma River watershed (Interactive map)
- Etymology: Coast Miwok

Location
- Country: United States
- State: California
- Region: Sonoma and Marin counties
- City: Petaluma, California

Physical characteristics
- Source
  - location: 1.5 mi (2 km) southwest of Cotati, California
  - coordinates: 38°18′18″N 122°43′03″W
  - elevation: 332 ft (101 m)
- Mouth: San Pablo Bay
  - location: 5 mi (8 km) east of Novato, California
  - coordinates: 38°06′38″N 122°29′15″W
  - elevation: 0 ft (0 m)
- Length: 18 mi (29 km)
- Basin size: 370 km² (140 sq. miles)
- Discharge
  - location: Petaluma (USGS gage station 11459000)
  - average: 17 cu ft/s (0.48 m^{3}/s)
  - minimum: 0 cu ft/s (0 m^{3}/s)
  - maximum: 9,620 cu ft/s (272 m^{3}/s)

Basin features
- Tributaries
  - left: Lichau Creek, Lynch Creek, Washington Creek, Adobe Creek
  - right: San Antonio Creek

The Petaluma River is a river in the California counties of Sonoma and Marin that becomes a tidal slough for most of its length. The headwaters are in the area southwest of Cotati. The flow is generally southward through Petaluma's old town, where the waterway becomes navigable, and then flows another 10 mi (16 km) through tidal marshes before emptying into the northwest corner of San Pablo Bay.

== History ==
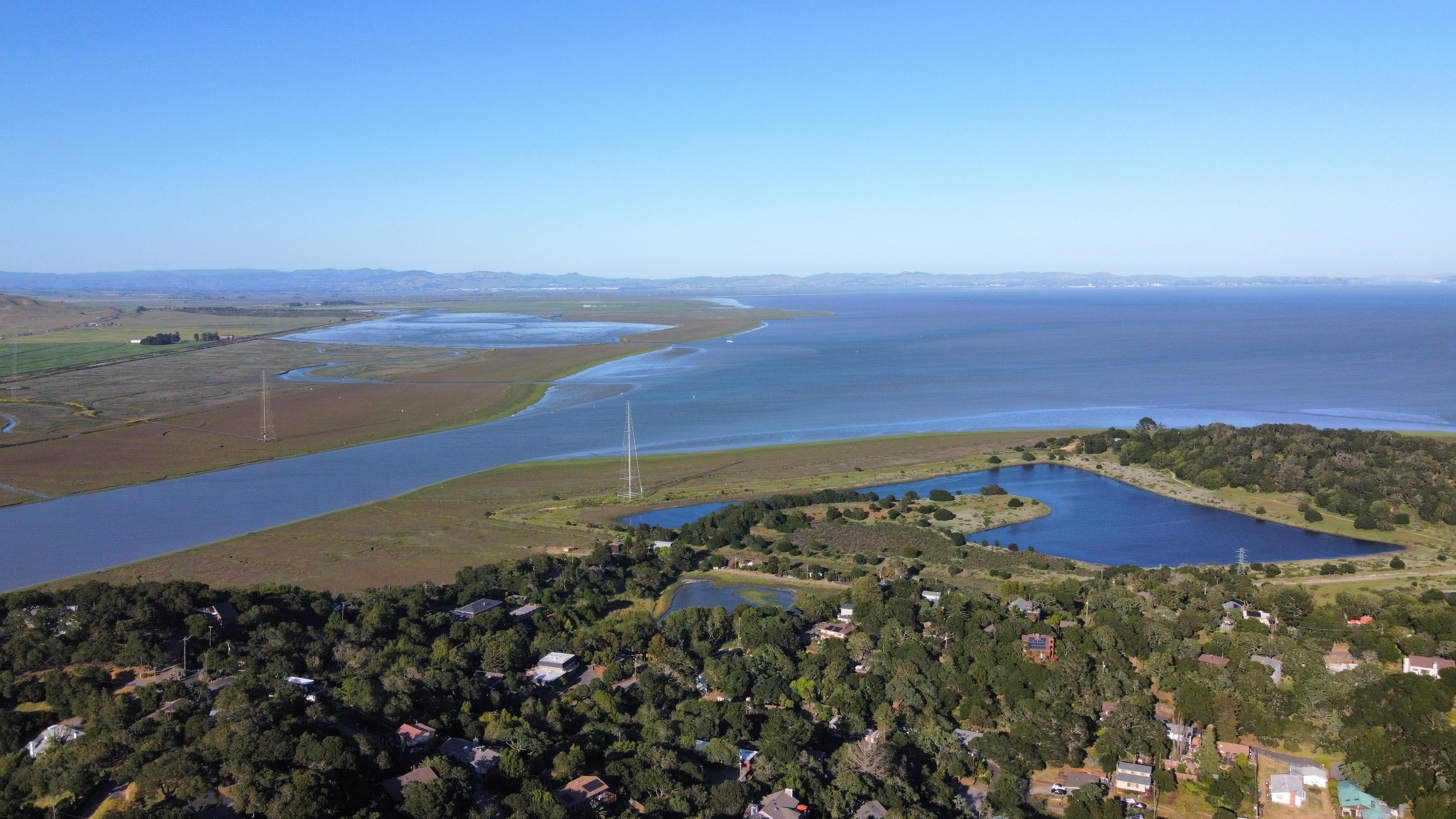
The mouth of the Petaluma River. View is to the northeast.

The word Petaluma may derive from the Miwok words pe’ta, flat, and luma, back. The Miwok people lived in Sonoma County for more than 2500 years. Petaluma was the name of a village on a low hill east of Petaluma creek and north east of the present day town of Petaluma. The first recorded exploration of the Petaluma River was by Captain Fernando Quiros in October, 1776. While other members of his Spanish expedition collected adobe and timber for the new Presidio of San Francisco and for the Mission San Francisco de Asís (Mission Dolores), Quiros and his sailors tried unsuccessfully to sail from San Pablo Bay to Bodega Bay. Petaluma River was named Petaluma Creek until the early 1960s.

== Petaluma River Watershed ==
Located in southern Sonoma County, California, and a portion of northeastern Marin, the Petaluma River Watershed drains 146 square miles (380 km^{2}). The watershed is approximately 19 miles (31 km) long and 13 miles (21 km) wide with the City of Petaluma near its center. At 2,295 feet (700 m), Sonoma Mountain is the highest point in the watershed, and its western slopes drain to the Petaluma River by way of tributaries such as Lichau Creek, Lynch Creek, Washington Creek, and Adobe Creek. The lower 12 miles (19 km) of the Petaluma River flow through the Petaluma Marsh, the largest remaining salt marsh in San Pablo Bay. The marsh covers 5,000 acres (20 km^{2}) and is surrounded by approximately 7,000 acres (28 km^{2}) of reclaimed wetlands. In the marshes west of Lakeville, the river is joined by San Antonio Creek, at which point it becomes the boundary between Marin County and Sonoma County. The river flows under State Route 37 at Green Point and enters northwest San Pablo Bay just north of Petaluma Point.

While the river's source lies over 300 ft (100 m) above sea level, it descends to 50 ft (15 m) within about 0.4 mi (600 m). The river is fully tidal 11 mi (18 km) from its mouth, indicating its slight gradient through the marshes below Petaluma. The United States Army Corps of Engineers dredges this section to keep it navigable by gravel barges and pleasure craft.

== Ecology ==
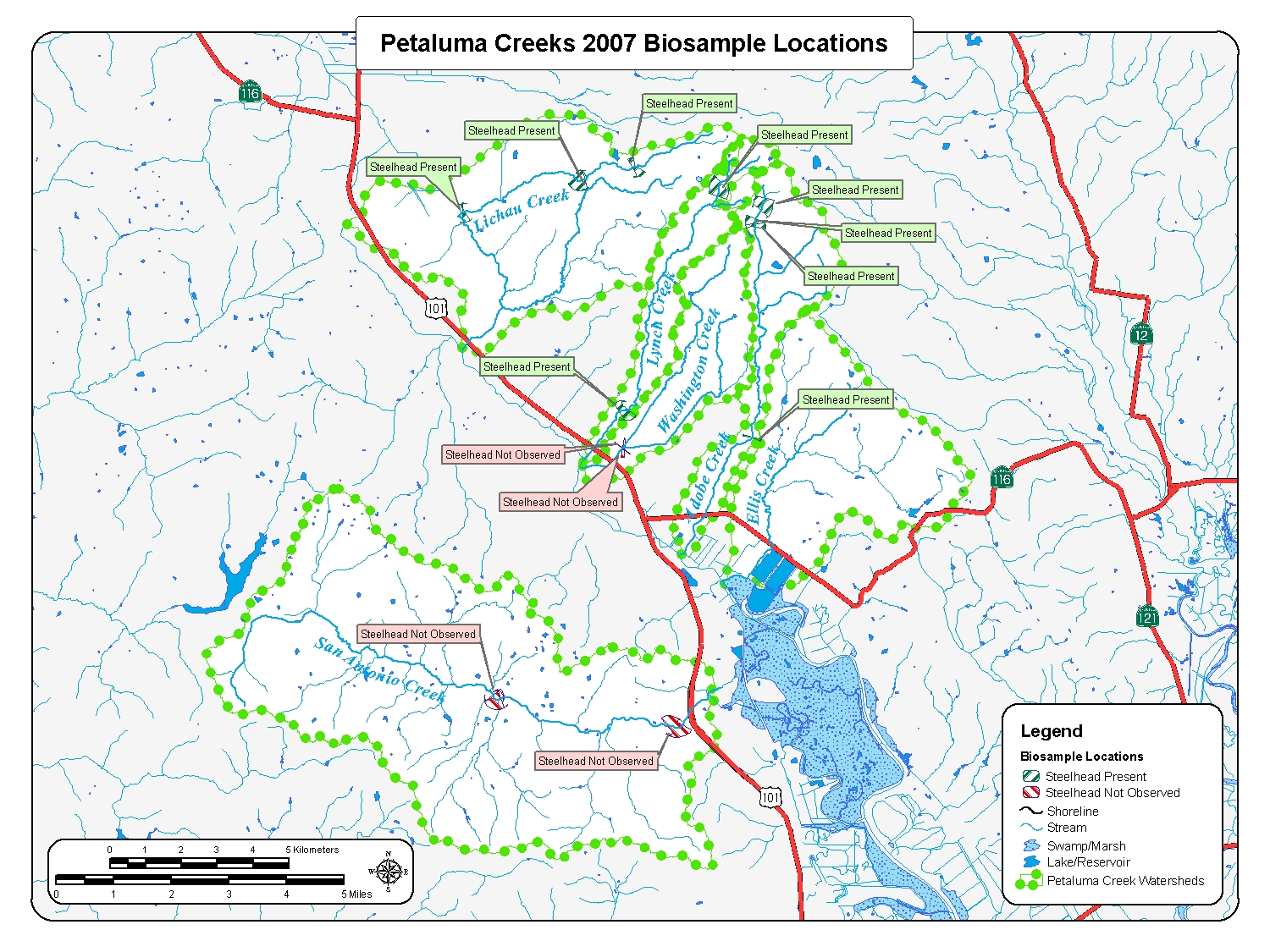
Petaluma River Watershed 2007 Steelhead Trout Biosurvey

The Petaluma River Watershed hosts several federally endangered animals including the salt marsh harvest mouse (Reithrodontomys raviventris), the North American river otter (Lontra canadensis), and Ridgway's rail (Rallus obsoletus). Endangered flora include soft bird's-beak (Cordylanthus mollis ssp. mollis), Baker's stickyseed (Blennosperma bakeri), Burke's goldfields (Lasthenia burkei), showy Indian clover (Trifolium amoenum), and Sebastopol meadowfoam (Limnanthes vinculans).

Steelhead (Oncorhyncus mykiss) that spawn and rear in the Petaluma River watershed are wild, not hatchery, stock. Chinook salmon (Oncorhynchus tshawytscha) are seen in the main stem of the Petaluma River and The United Anglers of Casa Grande High School have seen chinook at the turning basin, near the Lynch Creek confluence. The high school students constructed a salmonid hatchery in 1993 and in 2002 74 Chinook salmon returned to spawn in the Adobe Creek tributary.

== Habitat and pollution ==
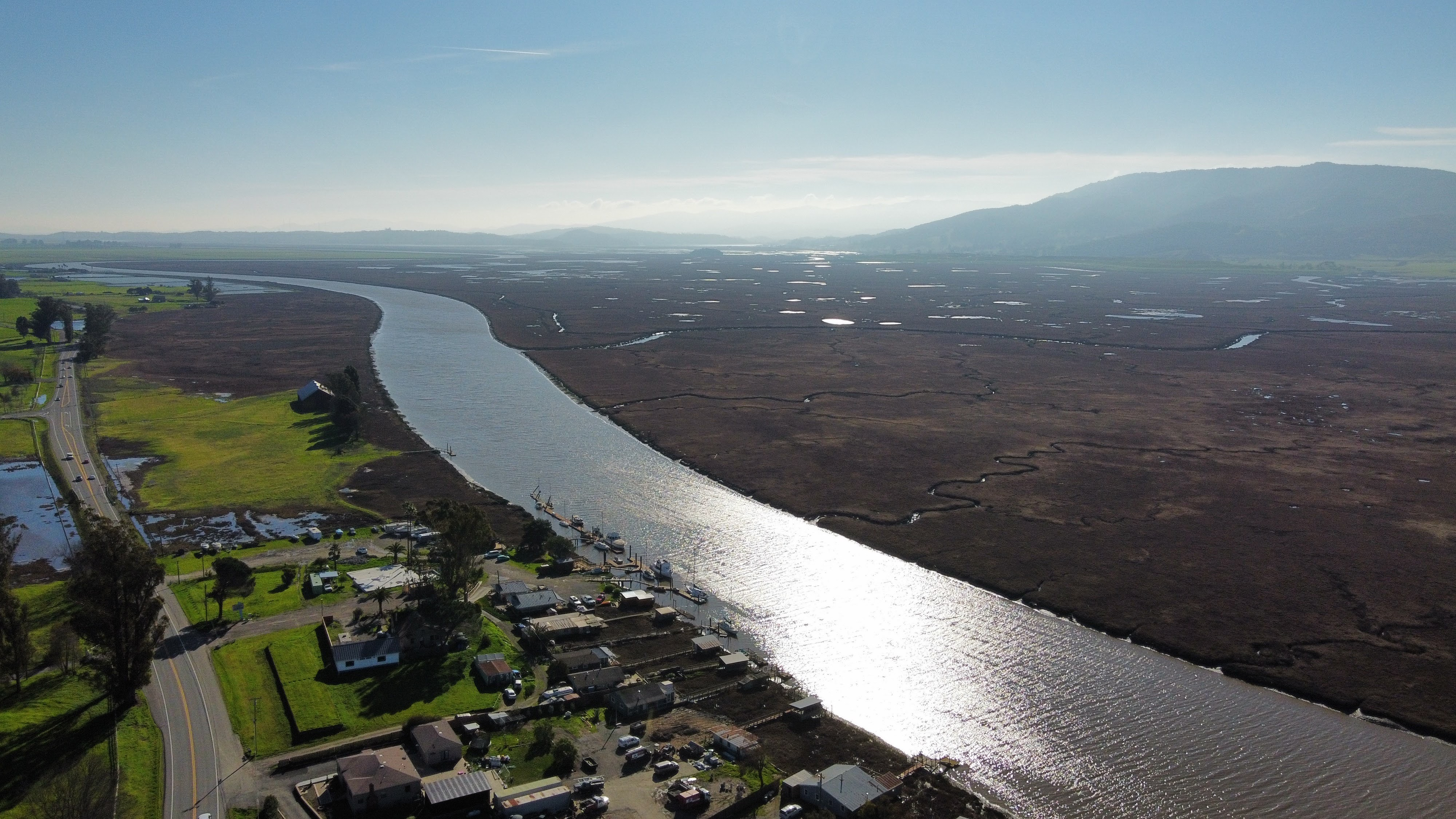
The Petaluma River Floodplain, west of Lakeville

The marshes provide an important wildlife habitat and fish hatchery. However, since the onset of intensive immigration in the mid-1850s, the water quality has diminished, partly due to overgrazing and other agricultural uses. Pollutants present in the river include nitrates, phosphates, petroleum hydrocarbons, pesticides and sediment. Urban runoff, particularly from the City of Petaluma, adds heavy metals and hydrocarbons to the river. Starting about 1990, material steps were taken to mitigate the pollution.

Because the Petaluma River is relatively well-protected, most of the pollution comes from nearby storm drains. It is up to the people of Petaluma to keep the river clean.

Because most of the length of the waterway is tidal and urban/suburban, there is a significant collection of tidally deposited debris along the banks. Despite the poor aesthetics including turbidity, the water quality is not particularly poor.

It has been alleged that the greatest threat to the Petaluma River is the planned Dutra asphalt plant. The reported concerns involve the "loud noises it will create" that will scare away the birds and "throw off the entire ecosystem".

== Bridges ==
The following bridges span the Petaluma River moving upstream from San Pablo Bay through Petaluma: the Black Point Railroad Bridge (NWP), California State Route 37, Haystack Landing Bridge (NWP), U.S. 101, D Street, Washington Street, Lakeville Street, NWP, Payran Street, NWP, Oak Drive, Corona Road, Petaluma Boulevard North, and Rainsville Road. The longest highway span, the 4-lane Route 37 bridge, is 2,183 ft (665 m) long and was built in 1958. The oldest public bridge, built in 1925, is a 114 ft (35 m) concrete triple span carrying two lanes of Petaluma Boulevard North.

Removal and replacement of the U.S. Route 101 highway bridge over the river began in 2013. The existing bridge was an 866 feet long, twin reinforced concrete box girder bridge (with a pre-cast I girder span over the river) that was built in 1955. It had two lanes of traffic in each direction, limited sight lines, and no shoulders. The new bridge is a 907 feet long, precast, post-tensioned spliced concrete girder design with three lanes of traffic in each direction and standard shoulders. Construction completed in mid-2016.

== Hog Island ==
Hog Island
- Location within San Francisco Bay Area Location within California Location within the United States

Geography
- Location: Northern California
- Coordinates: 38°09′33″N 122°32′18″W
- Adjacent to: Petaluma River

Administration
- United States
- State: California
- County: Sonoma

Hog Island is an island in the wetlands of the Petaluma River in Sonoma County, California, located near the Marin County line. San Antonio Creek enters the river just west of this island. It is mentioned in a newspaper article from 1914.

There are two other islands with the same name in the Bay area: Hog Island, in Tomales Bay in Marin County, and Hog Island in the Sacramento–San Joaquin River Delta in San Joaquin County.

== See also ==
- Endangered species
- List of rivers in California
- List of watercourses in the San Francisco Bay Area
- Wetland
