= Education in Marin County =

Schools in Marin County, California

Marin County, California contains many public and private schools and a few higher education institutions.

== School districts ==
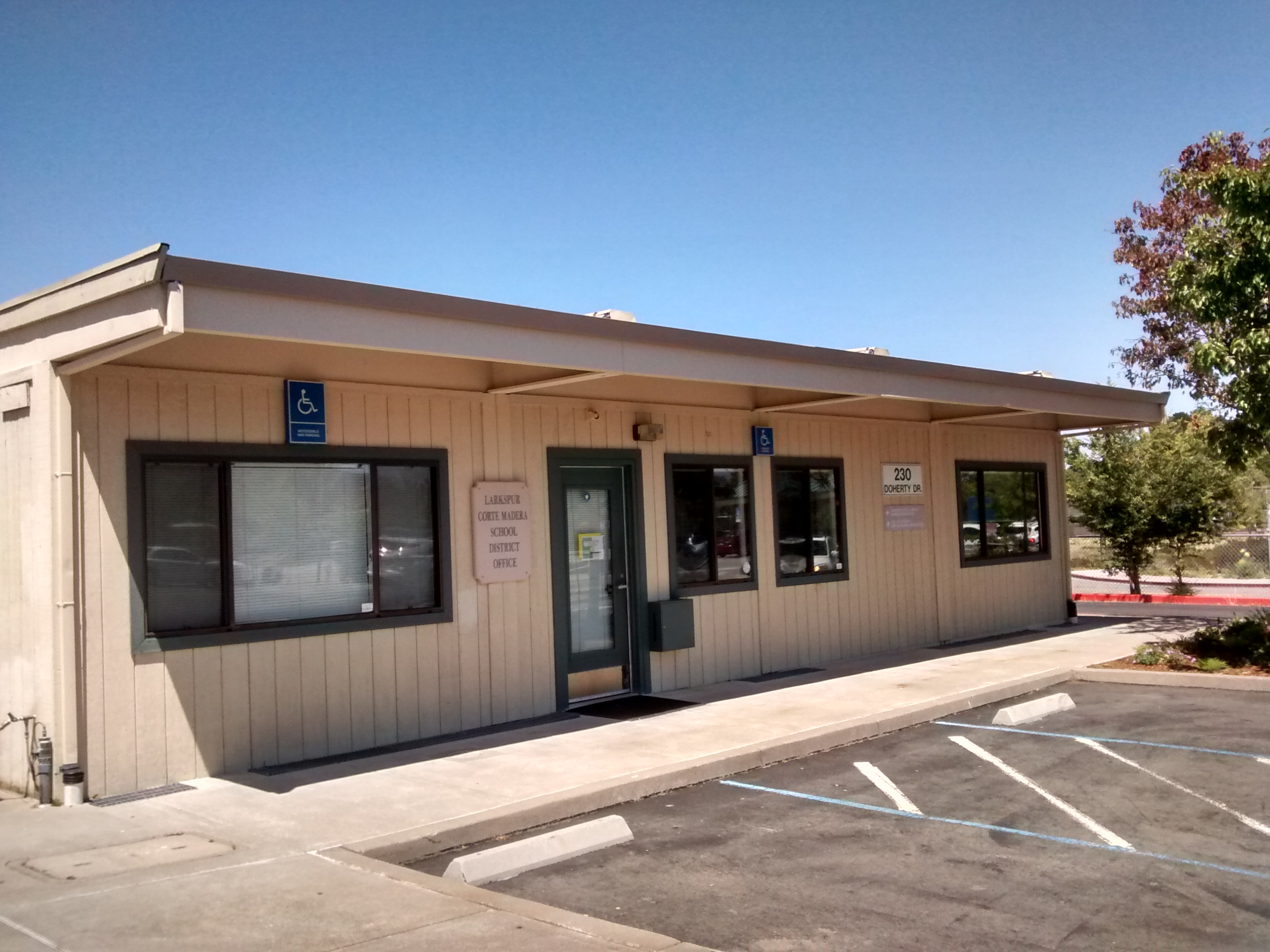
Larkspur-Corte Madera School District Office

School districts include:

K-12:

- Novato Unified School District
- Shoreline Unified School District

Secondary:

- Petaluma Joint Union High School District
- San Rafael City High School District
- Tamalpais Union High School District

Elementary:

- Bolinas-Stinson Union School District
- Dixie School District
- Kentfield Elementary School District
- Laguna Joint School District
- Lagunitas School District
- Larkspur School District
- Lincoln Elementary School District
- Mill Valley School District
- Nicasio School District
- Reed Union School District
- Ross Elementary School District
- Ross Valley School District
- San Rafael City Schools
- Sausalito Marin City School District

== Elementary and middle schools ==
=== Bolinas ===
- Bolinas-Stinson Union School District - Bolinas (4-8) & Stinson Beach (K-3)

=== Corte Madera ===
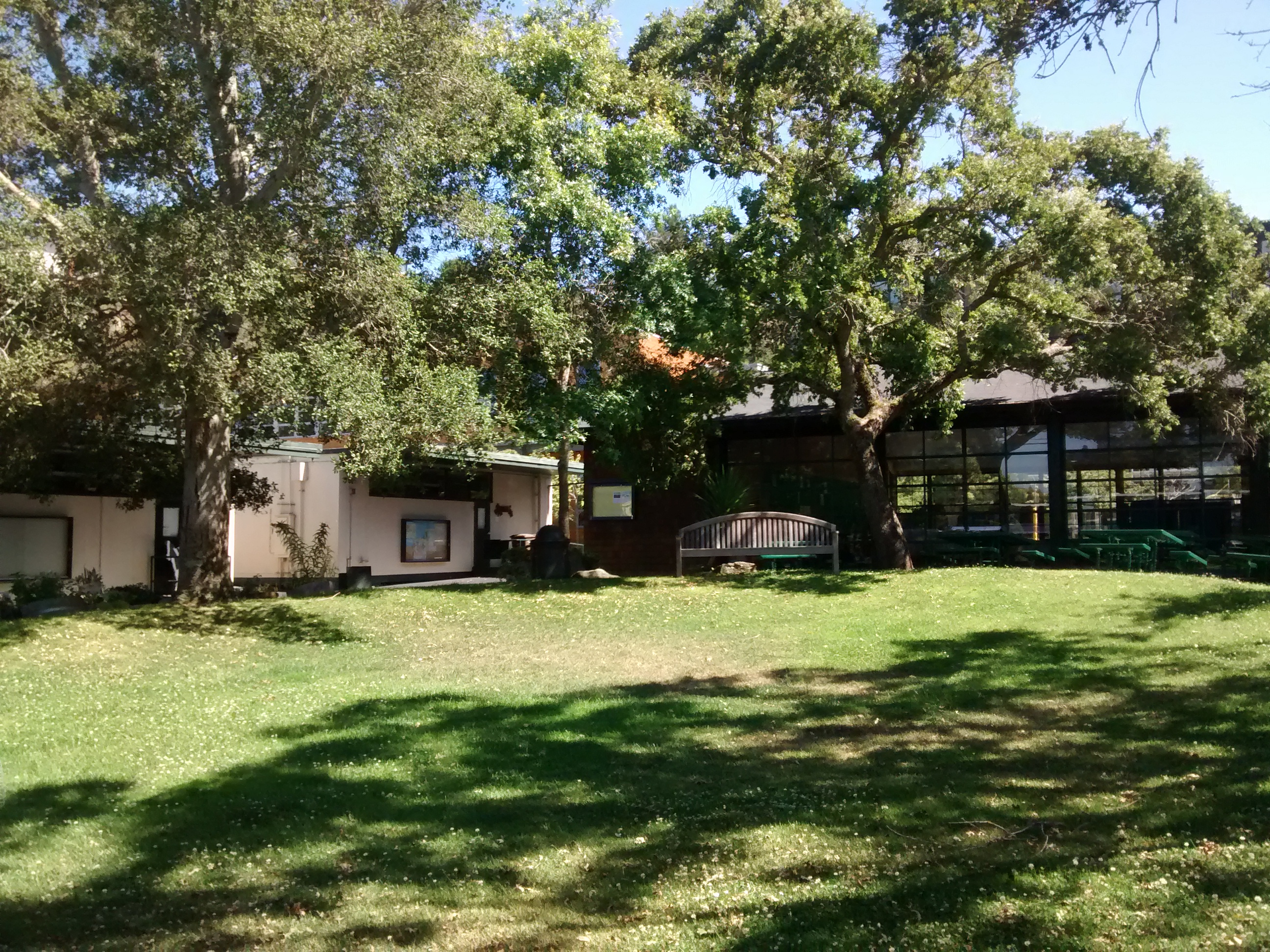
Marin Country Day School

- Marin Montessori School
- Marin Country Day School
- Neil Cummins Elementary School

=== Fairfax ===
- Manor School
- White Hill Middle School
- Saint Rita School (private)

=== Kentfield ===
- Adeline E. Kent Middle School
- Bacich Elementary

=== Larkspur ===
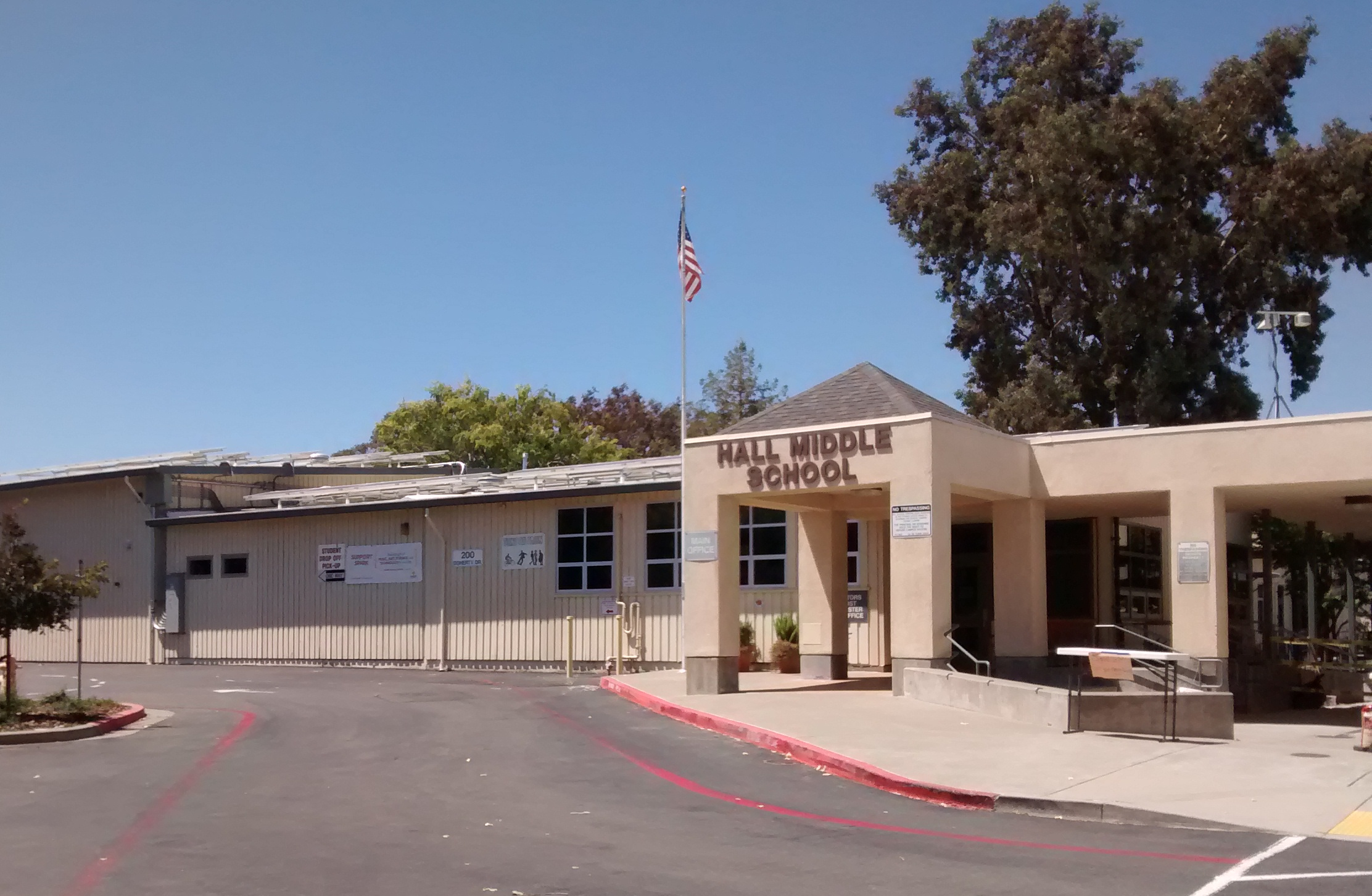
Hall Middle School

- Marin Primary & Middle School
- Henry C. Hall Middle School
- Ring Mountain School
- St. Patrick's (private)

=== Mill Valley ===
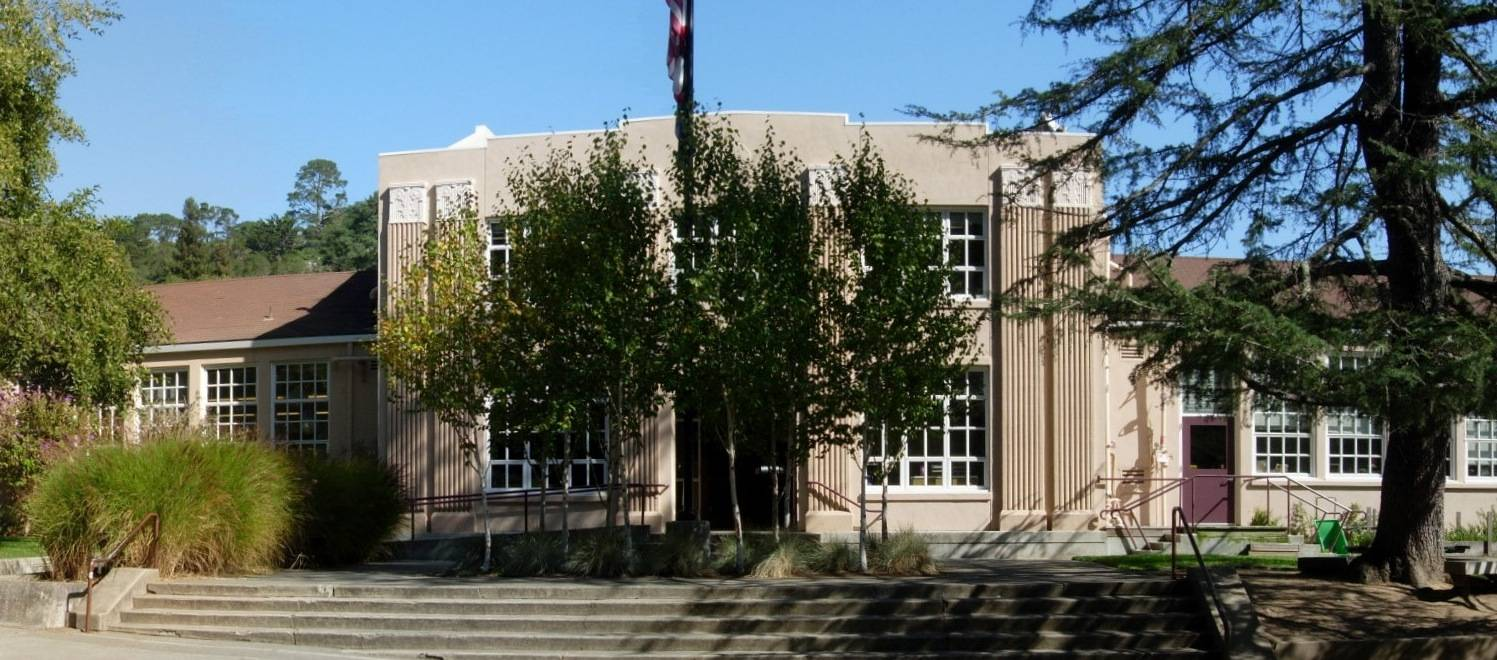
Old Mill School

- Old Mill School
- Edna Maguire Elementary
- Marin Horizon School
- Mill Valley Middle School
- Mount Tamalpais School
- Park School
- Tam Valley Elementary School
- Ring Mountain Day School
- Strawberry Point School

=== Novato ===
- Hamilton Elementary School
- Loma Verde Elementary School
- Lu Sutton Elementary School
- Lynwood Elementary School
- Montessori School Of Novato
- North Bay Christian Academy
- Novato Charter School
- Olive Elementary School
- Our Lady Of Loretto School
- Pleasant Valley Elementary
- Rancho Elementary School
- Samuel Hazelton School of the Arts
- San Jose Middle School
- San Ramon Elementary
- Sinaloa Middle School

=== Point Reyes Station ===
- West Marin School

=== Ross ===
- Ross School

=== San Anselmo ===
- Brookside Elementary School
- Wade Thomas Elementary School
- St. Anselm School (private)
- Hidden Valley Elementary School

=== San Rafael ===
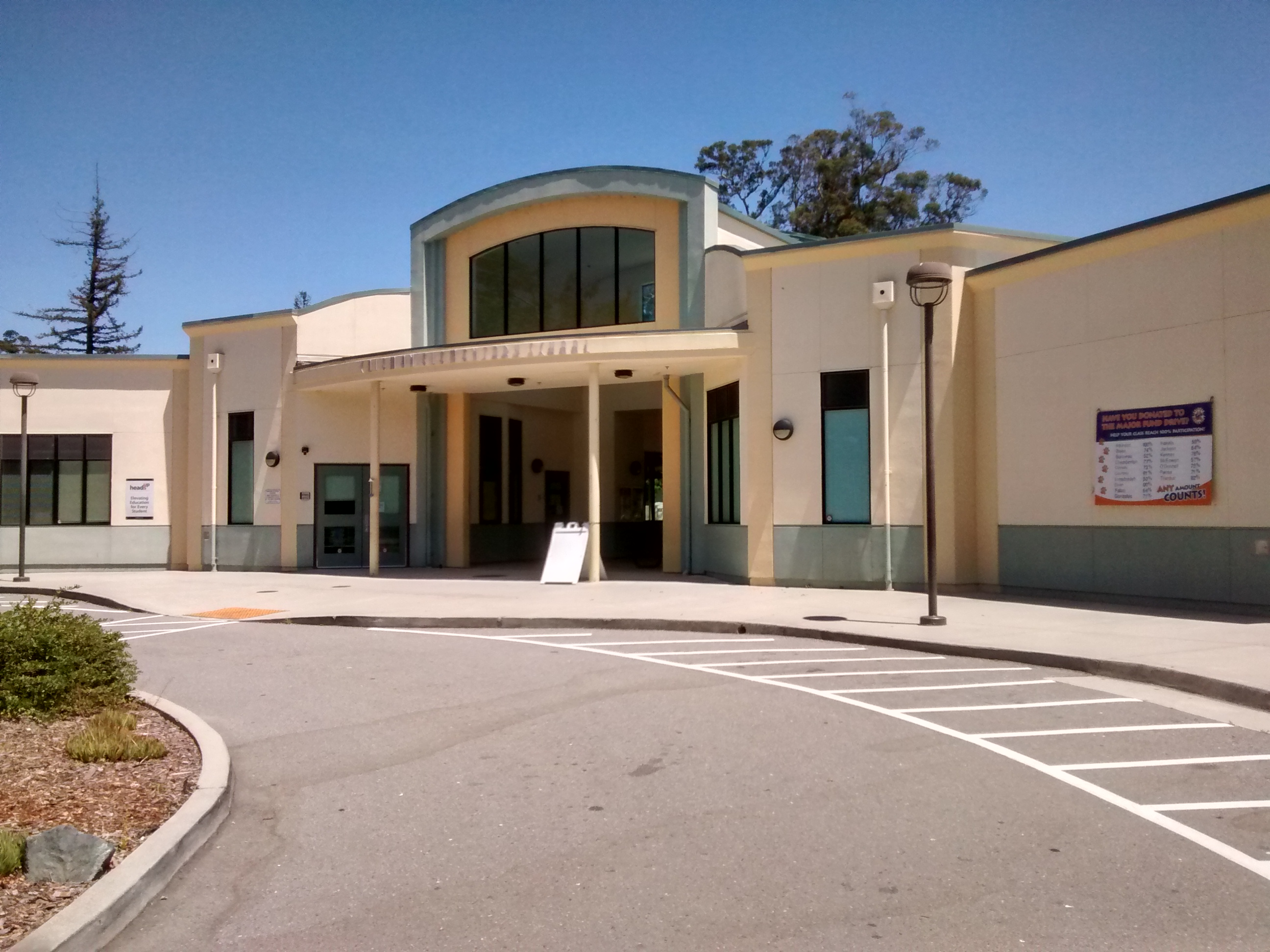
Coleman Elementary School

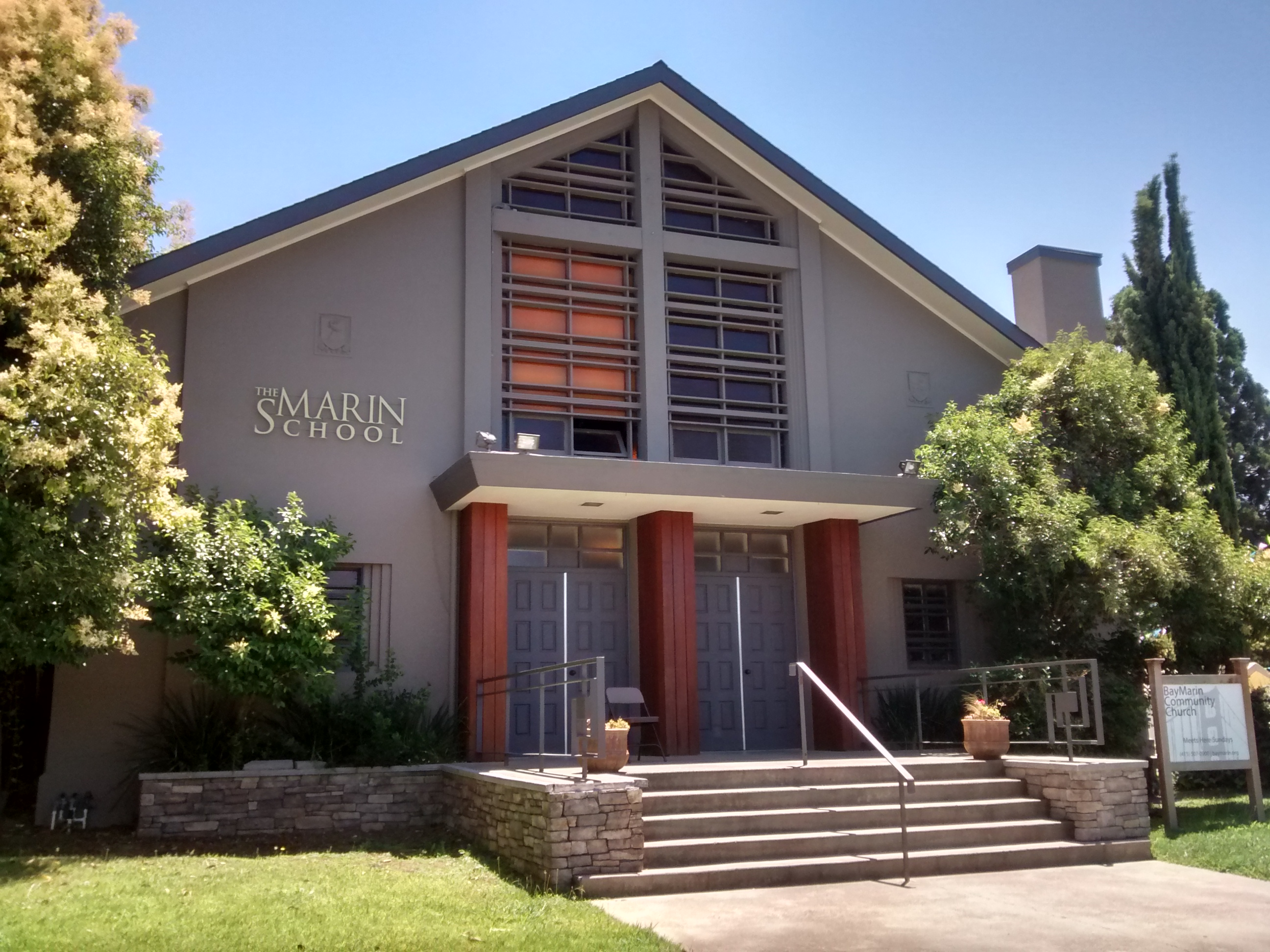
The Marin School

- Bahia Vista Elementary School
- Brandeis Marin
- Caulbridge School (private)
- Coleman Elementary School
- Glenwood Elementary School
- James B. Davidson Middle School
- Laurel Dell Elementary School
- Lucas Valley Elementary School
- Mary E. Sylveira Elementary School
- Miller Creek Middle School
- Sun Valley Elementary School
- Mark Day School - private
- St. Raphael School - private
- St. Isabella - private
- Vallecito Elementary School
- Venetia Valley K-8 School
- The Marin School

=== Sausalito ===
- Bayside/MLK Elementary School
- Willow Creek Academy School
- Headlands Preparatory School

=== Tiburon ===
- Bel Aire School
- Del Mar Middle School
- Reed Elementary School
- St. Hilary School

=== Tomales ===
- Tomales Elementary School

== High schools ==
=== Kentfield ===
- Marin Catholic High School, private school

=== Corte Madera/Tiburon/Ross/Greenbrae/Kentfield/Larkspur ===
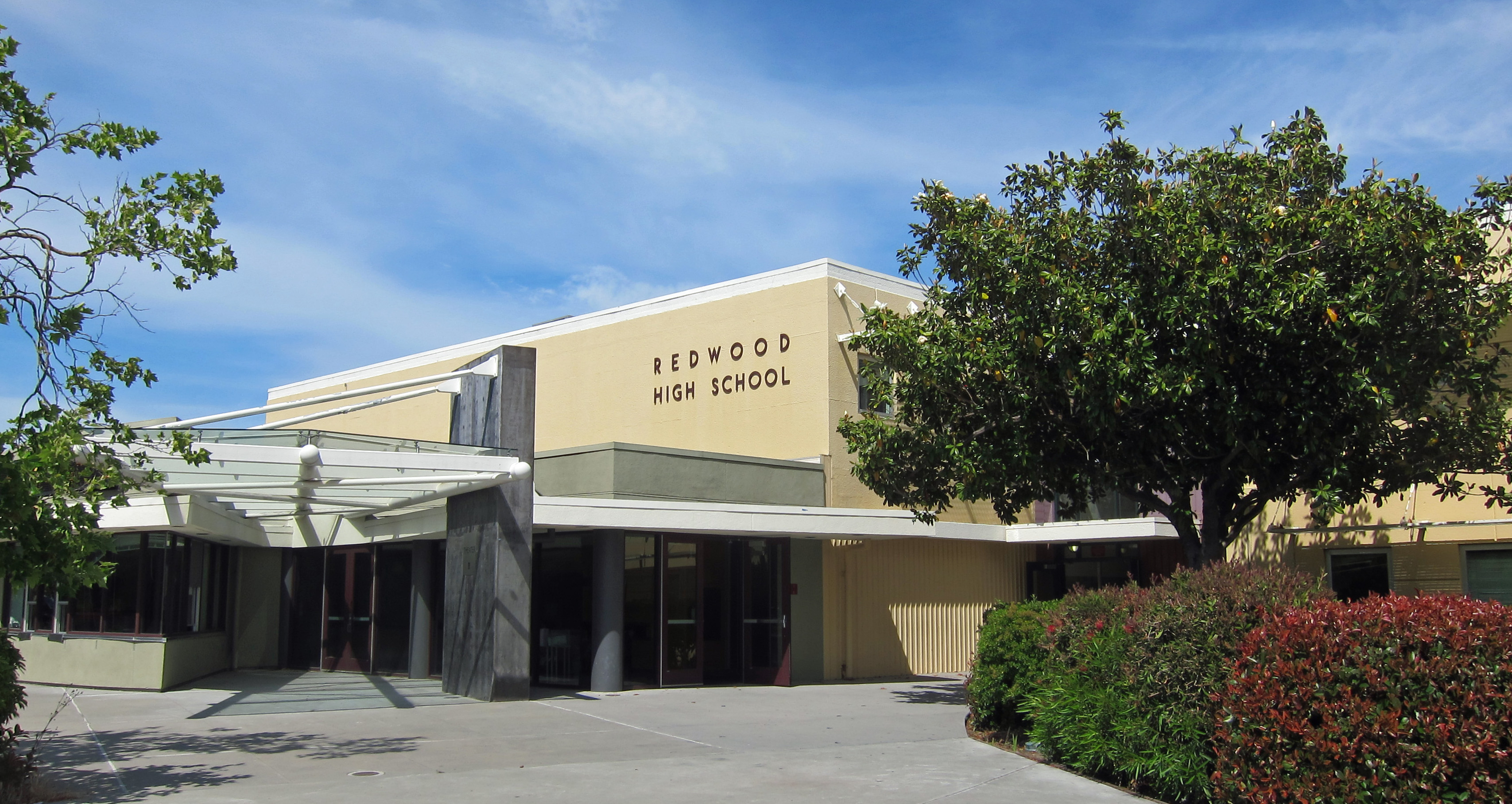
Redwood High School

- Redwood High School

=== Continuing Education ===
- San Andreas High School, continuation school
- Tamiscal High School, independent study

=== Mill Valley ===
- Tamalpais High School

=== Novato ===
- Marin Oaks High School, continuation school
- Marin School of Arts and Technology
- Novato High School
- San Marin High School
- North Bay Christian Academy

=== Ross ===
- The Branson School, private school

=== San Anselmo ===
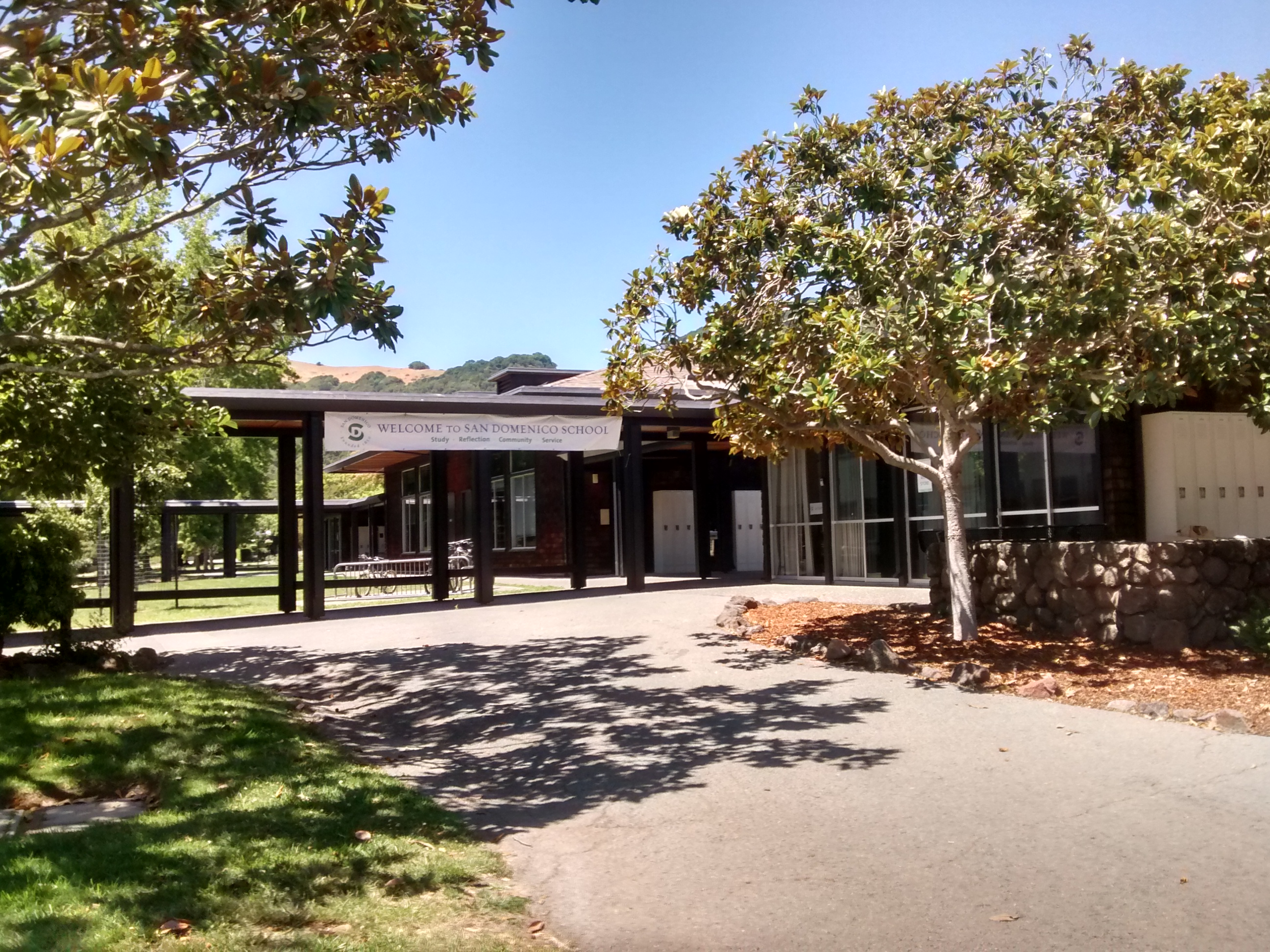
San Domenico School

- Archie Williams High School
- San Domenico School, private school

=== San Rafael ===
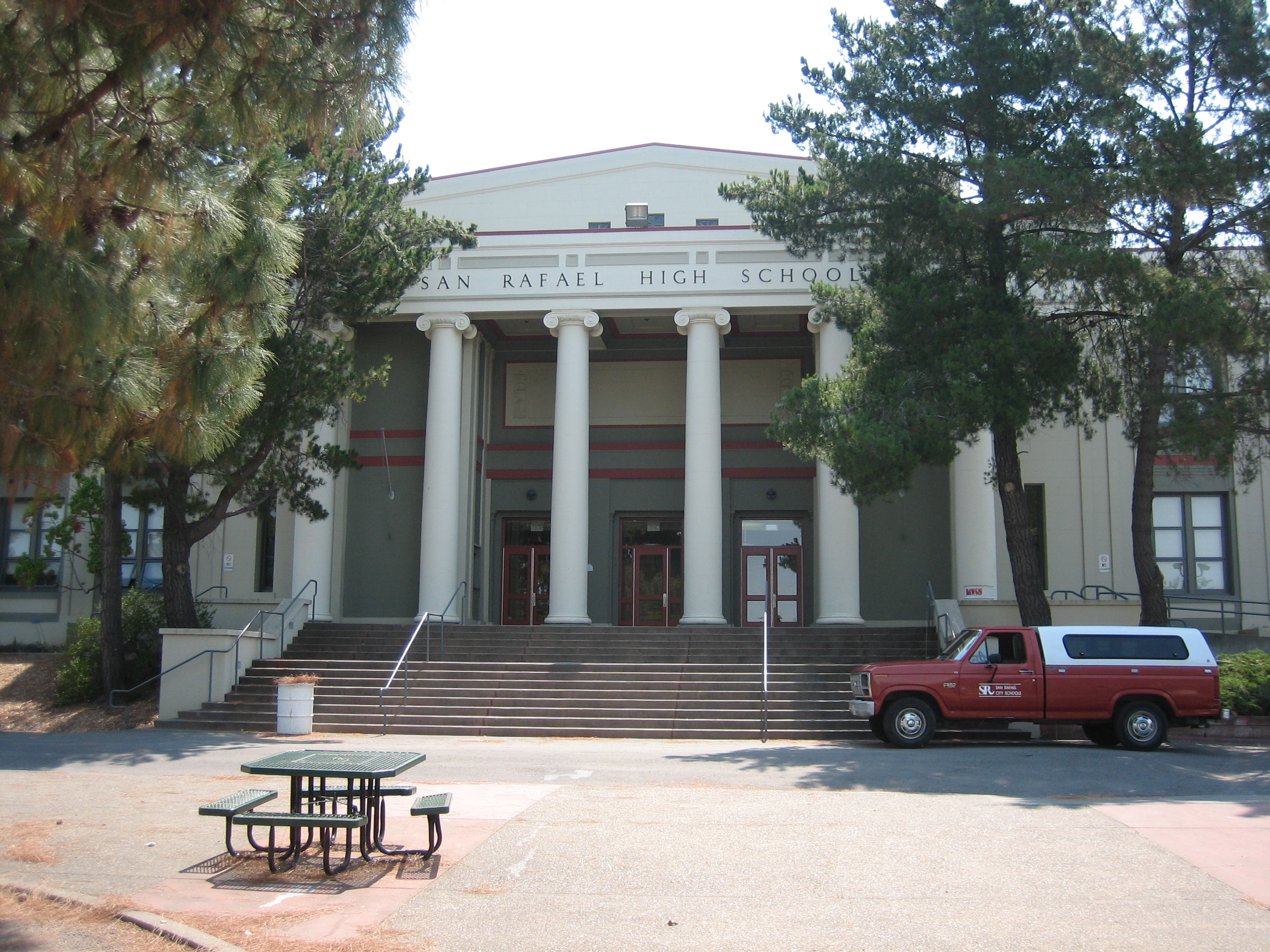
San Rafael High School

- Madrone High School, continuation school
- Marin Academy, private school
- San Rafael High School
- Terra Linda High School

=== Sausalito ===
- The Marin School, private school, closed in 2023

=== Tomales ===
- Tomales High School

== Colleges and universities ==
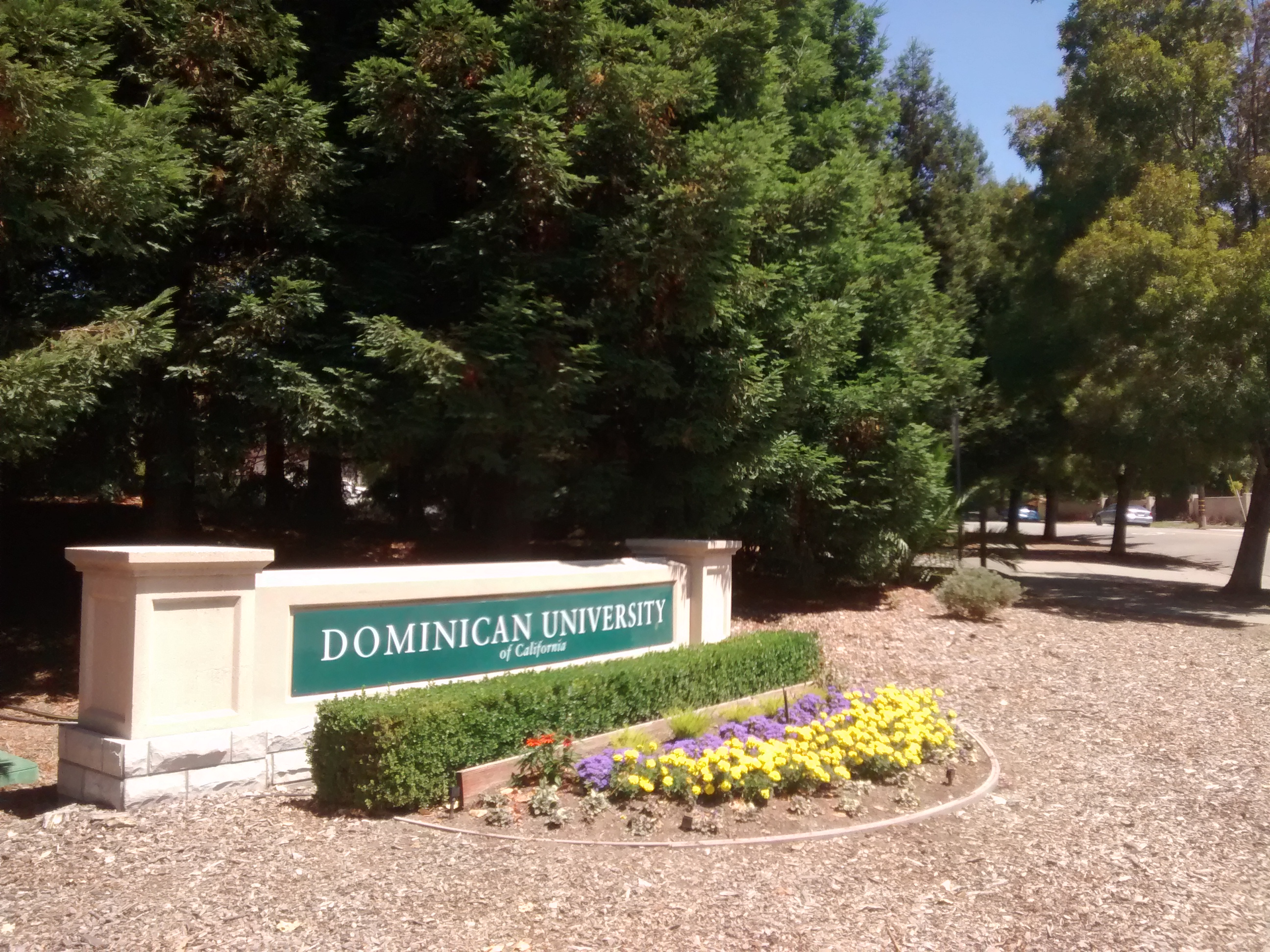
Dominican University of California

- College of Marin - Kentfield, Indian Valley
- Dominican University of California - San Rafael
- Golden Gate Baptist Theological Seminary, Strawberry Point
- San Francisco Theological Seminary - San Anselmo

=== Former colleges and universities ===
- Columbia Pacific University (1978–2000)
- World College West (1973–1992)

== Other schools and institutes ==
- Ali Akbar College of Music
- Institute of Noetic Sciences
