= Envision =

Envision may refer to:

== Organizations ==
- Envision EMI, a management company based in Virginia, USA
- Envision Energy, a wind turbine manufacturer and energy technology company based in Shanghai, China
- Envision Financial, a financial institution based in British Columbia, Canada
- Envision Healthcare, a hospital company based in the United States
- Envision Racing, a racing team that competes in Formula E
- Envision Schools, a school management organization based in San Francisco, USA
- Envision, Inc., a not-for-profit based in Wichita, Kansas, USA

== Vehicles ==
- Buick Envision, crossover vehicle
- EnVision, a Venus orbiter in development

== Other ==
- Olivetti Envision, an Italian multimedia device
- "Envision" (song), by the band Theatre of Tragedy
