= Michael Kearney =

American game show winner and child prodigy (born 1984)

- Born: 1984 (age 41–42); Honolulu, Hawaii, U.S.
- Education: Santa Rosa Junior College, AS, 1992; University of South Alabama, BA, 1994; Middle Tennessee State University, MS, 1998; Vanderbilt University, MS, 2002
- Known for: Child prodigy; Game show winner

Michael Kearney (born 1984) is an American game show winner and child prodigy. He is known for setting several world records related to graduating at a young age and his high earnings on television game shows.

Kearney was working at an improv theater group in Nashville, Tennessee, as of 2023.

== Education and early life ==
Kearney was born in Honolulu, Hawaii, to Kevin, an officer in the United States Navy who worked as an engineer, and Cassidy Kearney, a teacher of Japanese descent. He has a younger sister, Maeghan. Kearney was born two months prematurely because his mother had developed toxemia from anorexia nervosa and he had stopped growing in utero. Kearney developed early verbal and reading skills, speaking in full sentences at seven months old and reading phonetically after his first birthday. The family then relocated to Washington State. At age 3, he took apart the family television to see how it worked, but was unable to reassemble it. His parents then enrolled him in a Montessori school, where he was tested and placed in a mixed kindergarten and first-grade class. Kearney outpaced the material the school offered him, but performed poorly in certain tasks, causing him to act out. The family then relocated to Novato, California, and sought a psychological evaluation for Kearney at the University of San Francisco. He was then diagnosed with dysgraphia and attention deficit hyperactivity disorder. His parents declined to medicate him with his prescribed Ritalin.

At age 4, Kearney was reading at a fifth-grade level. The local elementary school stated he was too young to enroll, and would need to begin at age 5. His parents homeschooled him for the subsequent year, after which time he enrolled simultaneously in the ninth-grade at San Marin High School after taking a placement test, where he took Algebra and French accompanied by his mother, and Nova Independent High School, an alternative high school. His Algebra teacher questioned Kearney's comprehension of the material, emphasizing that while he could complete the computations, he did not demonstrate an understanding of them. Over the course of his freshman year, his parents became dissatisfied with the school's evaluation of Kearney's comprehension, arguing they were not properly assessing his competence. They then relocated to Santa Rosa, where he enrolled in Santa Rosa High School. He graduated the following year, at age 6. His parents then sought an intelligence quotient (IQ) exam for him. He was examined using the Stanford–Binet Intelligence Scales, as the administrators felt the Wechsler Intelligence Scale for Children would artificially inflate his IQ. According to a book written and published by his parents, his score was over 200 and above the norm by seven standard deviations.

=== College education ===
The following year, his parents argued to the California Community Colleges chancellor's office that Kearney could not be denied enrollment based on his age using a law meant to prevent age discrimination against senior citizens. He then enrolled in Santa Rosa Junior College, graduating with an Associate of Science in Geology at age 8.

Kearney's parents then relocated the family to Mobile, Alabama, where Kearney was accepted as a transfer student to the University of South Alabama. He majored in Anthropology. Kearney was allowed to type his coursework and exams, due to an accommodation exempting him from handwriting due to his learning disability, and his mother accompanied him in classes and took notes for him. He was awarded a Bachelor of Arts with honors in 1994, at age 10, entering him into the Guinness World Records. As of November 2026, Kearney remained the youngest person to have been awarded a high school diploma and an undergraduate degree.

After moving with his family to Hollywood, Los Angeles, to pursue a childhood career as a game show host, Kearney then applied to the University of Southern California to pursue postgraduate education in anthropology. When that did not work out, the family relocated to Murfreesboro, Tennessee, where Kearney and Maeghan enrolled in Middle Tennessee State University (MTSU). While Maeghan dropped out at age 13 due to difficulties adjusting to college, Kearney earned a Master of Science (MS) in Biochemistry in 1998 at age 14. He worked as a teaching assistant at MTSU post-graduation. He then relocated to Nashville, Tennessee, where he earned a second MS in Computer Science at Vanderbilt University at age 18 in 2002. Kearney worked toward a Doctor of Philosophy in Chemistry at MTSU before leaving academia to pursue an entertainment career. (Note: News sources offer an account that Kearney was awarded a PhD by MTSU, but MTSU claims that he earned a PhD at Vanderbilt.)

== Entertainment career ==
In the mid-1990s, while seeking a childhood career as a game show host, Kearney bested Hal Conklin, the mayor of Santa Barbara, California, in a game show playing the video game SimCity. As a result, Kearney served as Santa Barbara's Mayor for a day. Kearney interviewed for several roles and shot a pilot for a television show that was not picked up for production. He appeared in the made-for-television film Family Reunion: A Relative Nightmare as Shelly Dooley.

In October 2006, Kearney became a finalist on the trivia-and-puzzle game Gold Rush, winning US$100,000. In November 2006, in front of a national audience on Entertainment Tonight, he went on to win the grand prize of an additional US$1,000,000.

Kearney was a contestant on Who Wants to Be a Millionaire? in 2008. He won US$25,000. He was also a contestant on Million Dollar Password.

Kearney then went on to work in improvisational theatre. In 2017, the theatre was a finalist for The Tennessean's Toast readers' choice for best comedy club. As of 2023, he was still there.
