= Orinda (disambiguation) =

Orinda is a city in Contra Costa County, California.

Orinda may also refer to:

== Places ==
- Orinda Academy, high school in Orinda, California
- Orinda station, railway station in Orinda, California
- Orinda Union School District, K–8 school district in Orinda, California

== People ==
- Katherine Philips (1631–1664), also known as Orinda, Anglo-Welsh poet, translator, and woman of letters
- Orinda Dale Evans (born 1943), American judge

== Other ==
- MT Orinda, a semi-refrigerated LPG tanker built in 2002
- Orinda, a Martian crater (see: List of craters on Mars: O–Z)
- Orinda Formation, a geologic strata formation under parts of California
