= George C. Cory Jr. =

American pianist and composer

- Born: August 3, 1920; Syracuse, New York
- Died: April 11, 1978 (aged 57) San Francisco
- Genres: Jazz
- Instrument: Piano

George C. Cory Jr. (August 3, 1920 – April 11, 1978) was an American pianist and composer whose most notable work was creating the music of the song "I Left My Heart in San Francisco". His partner, Douglass Cross, wrote the lyrics. When the song was written in 1953, Cory and Cross were amateur songwriters who had moved to New York following military service during World War II and had become homesick for the West Coast. After pitching the song unsuccessfully to other artists for about eight years, the song was picked up by Ralph Sharon, Tony Bennett's musical director, who suggested to Bennett that it would be a good song for an upcoming 1962 "Happy New Year" engagement scheduled at the Fairmont Hotel in San Francisco. Mayor George Christopher and future mayor Joseph L. Alioto were in attendance. After a good response to the song, Bennett recorded it shortly thereafter and released it in February 1962. The song became an enduring hit and in 1969 was named as the official song of San Francisco. The two authors were present at the meeting when the city's Board of Supervisors selected it by a unanimous decision.

== Early career ==
Cory was born August 3, 1920, in Syracuse, NY but grew up in the San Francisco area and attended Old Mill School in Mill Valley. He attended Tamalpais High, class of 1937. He studied music at UC Berkeley, then enlisted in the army on September 14, 1942. While in the army, he met Douglass Cross who was also in the service at the time. Cross had been a baritone soloist (and youngest member) of the San Francisco Opera Company in 1941 when his career was interrupted by the war. During the war, Cory and Cross collaborated on musical shows for servicemen. After military service, the two moved to Brooklyn, New York, to make a career of songwriting and met with mixed success. They wrote over 200 songs together, but only 30 were published. The song, "I Left My Heart in San Francisco" was their only commercial success. The song provided them income for life when it became an international hit. In 2003, authors Cory and Cross received the "Towering Song Award" for the song, given by the Songwriters Hall of Fame and presented at the National Academy of Popular Music's 34th annual induction ceremony. Tony Bennett received the "Towering Performance Award" for his trademark rendition of the song.

== Death ==
Cory was found dead in his San Francisco apartment on April 11, 1978, of what The New York Times reported to be a drug overdose. The Los Angeles Times reported that he left a handwritten note, but its contents were not revealed. He had been despondent in previous weeks over failing health, according to the coroner's office. He was 57. His former partner, Douglass Cross, had died about 3 years before him, (Tuesday January 7, 1975) in a hospital in Petaluma, California.
