= Marin School of Arts and Technology =

Defunct charter school in California, United States

Coordinates: 38°04′31″N 122°34′42″W

The Marin School of Arts and Technology (MSAT) was a small charter school in Marin County, California, that existed between 2003 and 2007. Located in the College of Marin's Indian Valley campus in Novato, California, it was operated by Envision Schools, an organization funded by the Bill and Melinda Gates Foundation. Conceived as a "small high school," the school's focus was on teaching a rigorous, project-based curriculum, using art and technology as tools for learning.

== History ==
MSAT was granted a charter by the Novato Unified School District and opened in the 2003–04 school year. In 2007, it was closed and merged with its San Francisco-based sister school, the Metropolitan Arts and Technology High School.

By the end of the 2006–07 school year, the school graduated its first class, but was closed, blaming conflicts with the Novato Unified School District. Most of its students switched to the Metro program for the 2007–08 school year, commuting to San Francisco.
