= YWCA Building (Oakland, California) =

Historic women's building in California

- Oakland YWCA Building
- U.S. National Register of Historic Places
- Oakland Designated Landmark
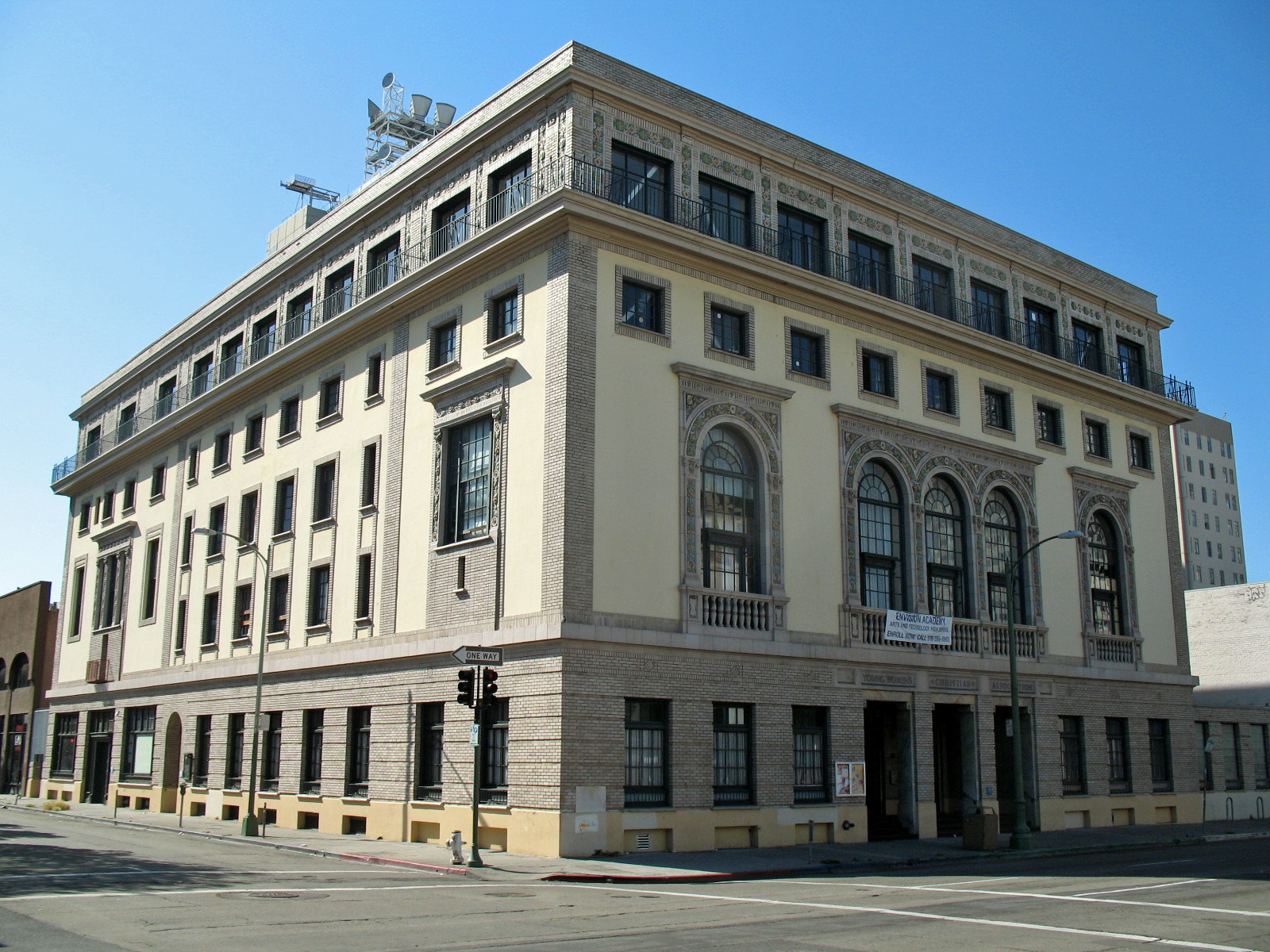
- At the intersection of Webster & 15th streets

- Location within California
- Location: 1515 Webster Street, Oakland, California 94612
- Coordinates: 37°48′17″N 122°16′06″W
- Built: 1915
- Built by: D. Z. Farquharson
- Architect: Julia Morgan
- Architectural style: Renaissance Revival
- NRHP reference No.: 84000755
- ODL No.: 18

Significant dates
- Added to NRHP: September 20, 1984
- Designated ODL: May 24, 1977

The YWCA Building, formerly the West Oakland Center of YWCA, is a historic Young Women's Christian Association building in Oakland, California designed by early female architect Julia Morgan. It was completed in 1915, became an Oakland Designated Landmark in 1977, and added to the National Register of Historic Places in 1984. It is now the Envision Academy of Arts & Technology and Common Webster.

== History ==
The Ladies Evangelical Philanthropic Society was founded in 1877 and the next year became the first affiliate of the YWCA in California. H.C. Capwell, owner of The Emporium, organized the campaign to raise funds for a new building.

The site's primary function was to serve as a temporary home for young women moving to the city for work from small towns or from overseas. It also hosted a number of groups for women including a Travelers Aid Service, Campfire Girls, and the Philomathian Club for Negro Women, an affiliate of the Business and Professional Women. The Linden Street YWCA at 828 Linden Street in Oakland closed in 1944 after about 20 years at that location, it was moved to 1515 Webster Street, Oakland and renamed as the West Oakland Center of YWCA.

During World War II, the organization staffed a 24-hour backdoor canteen for women working in the nearby defense industries. As the organization shrank in the late twentieth century, it struggled to continually raise funds to maintain the large structure; repairs and seismic retrofitting after the 1989 Loma Prieta earthquake were especially burdensome.

In 2000, the building was legally split into two parcels so that the top two floors could be sold for $1.3 million to the California College of the Arts to use as a dormitory. As that college moved to San Francisco, Starcity set up 66 single room occupancy units in the top two floors. In 2021, Common Company bought Starcity and marketed the space for co-living, one of 10 such sites they operate in the Bay Area.

The Oakland YWCA branch dissolved in 2005, transferring its remaining assets to the Berkeley YWCA. In 2007, the Berkeley YWCA left the building entirely and the three lower floors were leased to Envision Schools for the Envision Academy of Arts & Technology.

Highbridge Equity Partners bought the building in 2019 with plans for a hotel conversion but failed to secure funding and continued to be leased to both Common and Envision. In 2022, Common Webster had tenant complaints from residents around safety, maintenance and billing.

== Architecture ==
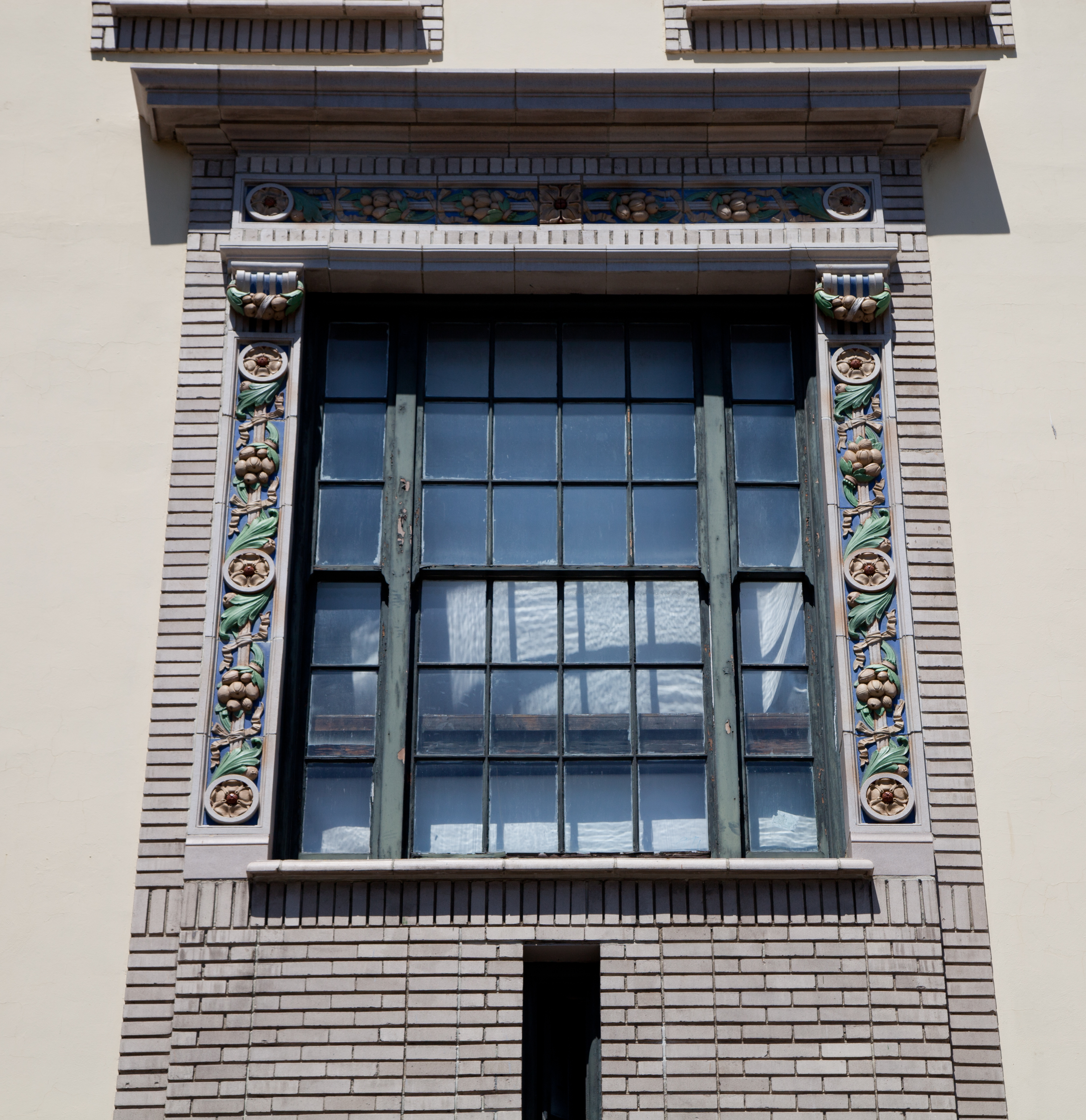
The window is surrounded with polychromed terra cotta depicting nuts and foliage with ribbons and bosses.

The selection of Julia Morgan, the most prominent female architect of the time, corresponded with the organization's mission to help women in Oakland. And the local YWCA president, Grace Merriam Fisher, knew Morgan personally from the Kappa Alpha Theta sorority at UC Berkeley. At the time, Morgan was also designing the YWCA Asilomar Conference Grounds for Phoebe Hearst and went on to do a number of other projects for the YWCA.

Morgan's Renaissance Revival design drew inspiration from Santa Maria della Pace in Rome. The interior included bedrooms, lounges with fireplaces, a cafeteria, a gymnasium, showers, classrooms, a swimming pool, and a 300-seat auditorium. Originally the building was three stories with an open courtyard, but later two stories were added which converted the courtyard into a large atrium. That atrium has Corinthian columns and is topped with an entablature containing a Scripture passage in gold lettering:

The heavens declare glory of God, and the firmament showeth His handiwork. Day unto day uttereth speech, and night unto night showeth knowledge - Psalm 19 v. 1,2.

The exterior is brick facing with glazed terra cotta and an entrance highlighted by rusticated brick piers. The front of the building has a triple and two single arched Palladian windows and many of the windows are surrounded with polychromed terra cotta depicting nuts and foliage with ribbons and bosses. The top cornice has iron cresting, and the cornerstone reads "DEDICATED TO NOBLER WOMANHOOD".

== See also ==
- List of YWCA buildings
- List of works by Julia Morgan
- List of Oakland Designated Landmarks
- National Register of Historic Places listings in Alameda County, California
