= Mike Wise (American football) =

American football player (1964–1992)

No. 90, 93
- Position: Defensive end

Personal information
- Born: June 5, 1964; Greenbrae, California, U.S.
- Died: August 21, 1992 (aged 28); Davis, California, U.S.
- Listed height: 6 ft 7 in (2.01 m)
- Listed weight: 271 lb (123 kg)

Career information
- High school: San Marin (Novato, California)
- College: UC Davis
- NFL draft: 1986: 4th round, 85th overall pick

Career history
- Los Angeles Raiders (1986–1990); Cleveland Browns (1991)

Career NFL statistics
- Sacks: 9.5
- Fumble recoveries: 4
- Stats at Pro Football Reference

Michael Allen Wise (June 5, 1964 – August 21, 1992) was a professional American football defensive end in the National Football League (NFL). He was selected by the Los Angeles Raiders in the fourth round of the 1986 NFL draft. He played five seasons in the NFL for the Raiders, and the Cleveland Browns.

== Early life ==
Wise was born in Greenbrae, California, and attended San Marin High School in Novato, California. He played college football at the University of California, Davis; during his senior year, he was voted "Northern California Athletic Conference Player of the Year".

== Professional career ==
=== Los Angeles Raiders ===
Wise was drafted by the Los Angeles Raiders as the 85th overall pick in the fourth round of the 1986 NFL draft. Wise played four seasons as a defensive end with the Raiders from 1986 to 1990. He once appeared on the cover of a 1990 issue of Sports Illustrated.

However, during his time with the Raiders, Wise dealt with injuries and personal problems. In the 1991 off-season, Wise reported to training camp, but left several times without permission from the team; Wise was unhappy about his diminished role on the team, a contract dispute, and was also distraught over the declining health of his grandfather, Ray, who was rapidly losing his eyesight.

In August, according to eye witnesses, Wise got into a fight with his Raiders teammate, defensive lineman Emanuel King, where he knocked King down with one punch; King later on tried to attack Wise with a tire iron. The Raiders released Wise to free agency on October 10.

=== Cleveland Browns ===
One day after being waived by the Raiders, Wise was signed by the Cleveland Browns on October 11, 1991; Wise played three games for the Browns during the 1991–92 season, before sitting out the remainder of the season due to a knee injury. In a mini-camp during the following off-season, Wise hurt his back while doing a squat press; the Browns released him to free agency on August 4, 1992, despite his bad back.

After being waived by the Browns, Wise became depressed as his injured back did not respond to treatment, and he was forced to sell his house in Davis, California; at that time, Wise and his attorneys were filing an injury grievance against the Browns.

== Personal life ==
During his time with the Los Angeles Raiders, Wise met his girlfriend, Mary McBride, on a blind date at a steak house in Davis.

After he was waived by the Cleveland Browns, Wise called McBride to come pick him up at his home; the couple once lived together, and had planned to get married next spring. McBride was the last person to see Wise alive before his death.

== Death ==
On August 21, 1992, Wise committed suicide at his home in Davis, at the age of 28; he was found dead in his bedroom with a self-inflicted gunshot wound to the head. Wise was buried in Novato.
