= Ellen Estes =

American water polo player (born 1978)

Personal information
- Full name: Ellen Marie Estes -Lee
- Born: October 13, 1978 (age 47) Portland, Oregon, United States
- Education: Stanford University; Harvard University (MBA)
- Occupation: Biotechnology Executive
- Height: 182 cm (6 ft 0 in)
- Weight: 77 kg (170 lb)

Sport
- Sport: Water polo
- College team: Stanford University
- Club: Marin Water Polo Club
- Coached by: John Tanner (Stanford); Guy Baker (Olympics)
Medal record
Representing United States
Olympic Games
Silver medal – second place	2000 Sydney	Team competition
Bronze medal – third place	2004 Athens	Team competition
World Championships
Gold medal – first place	2003 Barcelona	Team competition
Pan American Games
Silver medal – second place	1999 Winnipeg	Team competition

Ellen Marie Estes also known by her married name Ellen Marie Lee, (born October 13, 1978) is an American water polo player, who competed for Stanford University and won the silver medal at the 2000 Summer Olympics in Sydney and a bronze medal at the 2004 Summer Olympics in Athens. Estes scored three goals in the U.S. water polo team's 6-3 win over Australia in the bronze medal match at the August, 2004 Olympics. After graduating from Stanford with a major in engineering, and from Harvard Business School with an MBA, she has worked as an Executive in the field of Biotechnology.

Ellen Estes was born October 13, 1978 in Portland, Oregon to father Gary and mother Carol Estes. Ellen started playing water polo with the Marin Water Polo Club, and continued at Novato, California's Novato High School. At Novato High, she was the Most Valuable Player and captain of the water polo team in 1996, and helped take Novato High to the North Coast Section Championships, where they finished in third place. Estes was a Marin County Athletic League Most Valuable Player and as a strong student, was a scholar-athlete for Marin County in 1996. In addition to her leading the water polo team, she captained Navato High's swim team in 1996. In swimming competition, she was a league champion in the 50 freestyle event. Graduating Novato High in June, 1996, Estes was a California Scholarship Federation recipient, a Bank of America Achievement Certificate winner, a recipient of a Presidential Academic Fitness Award, and one of two California Interscholastic Arco Scholar of the Year nominees.

== Stanford University ==
Estes studied and played water polo at Stanford University, where she was managed by Head Coach John Tanner and had a collegiate career total of 214 goals. Leading a strong program, Tanner was credited with 10 NCAA championship team titles as Head Coach for Women's water polo at Stanford from 1998-2026. In her Senior year, Estes was part of Stanford's 2002 NCAA National Championship Team. She was a two-time All-American, and broke a Stanford scoring record with 93 goals in her sophomore year. As a Freshman at Stanford in 1997, Estes totaled 49 goals, the second highest scorer on the team, made All-America second team, and was MPSF Northern Division First-Team. As a Junior, she had the third most goals scored for the team with 37. She took off time from Stanford in 1999 to train with the U.S. Olympic team. She graduated with a Mechanical Engineering degree at Stanford, and studied roller-coaster design as an intern with Disney.

== Olympics ==
=== 2000 Sydney silver medal ===
In 2000, under the coaching of women's Olympic Head Coach Guy Baker, she won a silver medal at the 2000 Sydney Olympics in the 2000 Olympic women's water polo team competition. The Sydney Olympics were the first to offer water polo as a women's sport. Estes scored a goal in the U.S. team's first game against Australia, where the U.S. team lost 7-6. Australia won four of their first five matches, and were seeded first advancing to the semi-finals. In the semi-finals, Australia and the U.S. team defeated Russia and the Netherlands, 7-6 and 6-5, respectively, removing them from medal contention. In the final match for the gold and silver medals, the US team were ahead 2-1 over Australia at halftime. With only 13 seconds remaining on the clock, the U.S. team scored bringing the game to a 3-3 tie, but with just 1.3 seconds left in the game, Australia scored on a penalty shot, winning the gold medal, 4-3, with the U.S. taking the silver. The women's team from Russia took the bronze medal.

In 2003, Estes was named the USA Water Polo Female Athlete of the Year.

=== 2004 Athens bronze medal ===
Again managed by Head Coach Guy Baker, Estes participated in the August, 2004 Athens Olympics, where the U.S. team won the bronze medal in the 2004 Olympic water polo team competition. In the initial semi-final match the Greek team defeated Australia 6-2, advancing to the finals. In the other semi-final match, Italy was outscored by the U.S. team, but won a close game with a score of 6-5. In the final gold and silver medal match between Italy and Greece, the teams were in a 7-7 tie at the end regular play. In the first overtime period, Greece led 9-7 in the first overtime, but Italy rebounded and captured the gold medal 10-9 in the second overtime. Australia took fourth place losing to the U.S. team in the bronze medal match. In the U.S. match for the Bronze medal against Australia on August 26, 2004, Estes scored three goals in a 6-5 win, but the U.S. team had earlier led by 4 goals, with a 5-1 lead.

=== International competition highlights ===
Estes played water polo for Team USA from 1999-2004.

In international competition in 2003, Estes played with the U.S. team that won the gold medal at the FINA World Championships and the Pan American Games. She also won a team silver medal at the 2002 World Cup with the U.S. team, and a silver medal from the Pan American Games in Barcelona in 1999.

== Careers ==
From 2007–2009, she was a volunteer assistant coach for the Harvard University Men's and Women's Water Polo Teams, while finishing her MBA at Harvard Business School. She has served on USA Water Polo's Board of Directors.

After leaving competitive swimming, Ellen worked for the Boeing Company as a Satellite Systems Engineer, and in 2009 began working for Genentech, a healthcare and biotechnolgy company that develops medicines where she eventually became a Vice-President.

=== Honors ===
In 2012, she was inducted into the USA Water Polo Hall of Fame.

== Performances ==
- Olympic Games: Silver Medal (2000), Bronze Medal (2004)
- World Championships: Gold Medal (2003)
- Pan American Games: Second Place (1999)
- FINA World Cup: Second Place (2002)

== See also ==
- United States women's Olympic water polo team records and statistics
- List of Olympic medalists in water polo (women)
- List of world champions in women's water polo
- List of World Aquatics Championships medalists in water polo
