= Jalal Leach =

American baseball player (born 1969)

- Outfielder
- Born: March 14, 1969 (age 56); San Francisco, California
- Batted: Left Threw: Left

MLB debut
- September 5, 2001, for the San Francisco Giants

Last MLB appearance
- October 6, 2001, for the San Francisco Giants

MLB statistics
- Games played: 8
- At bats: 10
- Hits: 1
- Stats at Baseball Reference

Teams
- San Francisco Giants (2001)

Jalal Donnell Leach (born March 14, 1969), is an American former professional baseball outfielder who played for the San Francisco Giants of Major League Baseball in 2001. He was primarily used as a pinch hitter by the Giants. He threw and batted left-handed, stood 6 feet 2 inches (1.88 m) tall and weighed 200 pounds (91 kg) during his professional career, which lasted for 15 seasons (1990–2004).

== Career ==
Born in San Francisco, Leach attended San Marin High School in Novato, California. He enrolled at Pepperdine University and played college baseball for the Pepperdine Waves. In 1989, he played collegiate summer baseball with the Wareham Gatemen of the Cape Cod Baseball League and was named a league all-star.

The New York Yankees selected Leach in the seventh round of the 1990 Major League Baseball draft. Before the 1998 season, the San Francisco Giants acquired Leach and Scott Smith from the Seattle Mariners for David McCarty.

In 12 plate appearances during his September 2001 trial with the Giants, he collected two bases on balls and one hit, a single off Octavio Dotel of the Houston Astros on September 19.

After his playing career, Leach became a scout, working for the Yankees. He returned to the Giants in that role for the 2016 season.
