= Family Reunion: A Relative Nightmare =

- Film poster
- Written by: Patrick J. Clifton; Neal Israel
- Directed by: Neal Israel
- Starring: Melissa Joan Hart; Jason Marsden; David L. Lander; Romy Windsor; Marcia Strassman
- Music by: Robert Folk
- Country of origin: United States
- Original language: English

Production
- Producers: S. Bryan Hickox; Neal Israel
- Cinematography: Vincent Baldino; Ronald M. Lautore
- Editor: Tom Walls
- Running time: 89 minutes
- Production company: Hickox-Bowman Productions Inc.

Original release
- Network: ABC
- Release: April 1, 1995

Family Reunion: A Relative Nightmare is a 1995 American comedy television film starring Melissa Joan Hart and Jason Marsden. It was directed by Neal Israel and written by Israel and Patrick J. Clifton. It was originally aired by ABC on April 1, 1995.

== Plot ==
Teenager Billy Dooley has to deal with his ultra-competitive family's annual reunion and his sudden interest in a mysterious runaway girl who happens to be at the event.

== Cast ==
- Melissa Joan Hart as Samantha
- Jason Marsden as Billy Dooley
- David L. Lander as Various Jamesons
- Romy Windsor as Grace Dooley
- Michael Kearney as Shelley Dooley
- Marcia Strassman as Margaret McKenna
