= Martin Baccaglio =

American football player (born 1944)

No. 84, 85
- Position: Defensive end

Personal information
- Born: September 28, 1944 (age 82); San Francisco, California, U.S.
- Listed height: 6 ft 3 in (1.91 m)
- Listed weight: 245 lb (111 kg)

Career information
- High school: Novato (Novato, California)
- College: San Jose State
- NFL draft: 1967: 14th round, 355th overall pick

Career history
- San Diego Chargers (1968); Cincinnati Bengals (1968–1970)

Career NFL/AFL statistics
- Fumble recoveries: 1
- Sacks: 1.5
- Stats at Pro Football Reference

Martin Hoppe "Marty" Baccaglio (born September 28, 1944) is an American former professional football player who was a defensive end in the American Football League (AFL) and National Football League (NFL). He played college football at San José State University and in high school at Novato High School. He played professionally in the American Football League (AFL) for the San Diego Chargers in 1968 and for the Cincinnati Bengals from 1968 to 1970.

== See also ==
- List of American Football League players
