= Common (company) =

American coliving company

- Company type: Private
- Industry: Real estate
- Founded: 2015; 11 years ago in New York City
- Founder: Brad Hargreaves
- Defunct: June 2024
- Fate: Bankrupted
- Headquarters: New York City, United States
- Website: common.com

Common was an American coliving company founded in 2015 and headquartered in New York City. Brad Hargreaves is the company's CEO and founder. As of June 2020, Common managed 48 multifamily buildings in nine cities across the U.S.: New York, Jersey City, Los Angeles, San Francisco, Chicago, Washington, D.C., Seattle, Philadelphia, and Fort Lauderdale. The company had plans to expand to 22 cities across the globe, and had 15,000 beds signed and under development.

In March 2019, Common partnered with New York real-estate developer Tishman Speyer to launch the brand Kin, whose "buildings will feature playrooms, family-size units and on-demand child care through an internal mobile app that also helps connect families looking to share nannies and babysitters." In May 2020, Common announced the launch of Noah, a workforce housing brand. Noah operates “Class B and C multifamily buildings where renters earn 40 percent to 80 percent of the area median income” and as of March 2020, is operating “500 units over five properties in Hampton Roads and Winchester, Virginia.”

From 2015 to 2017, Common raised $63.35 million in funding. The latest Series C funding round led by Norwest Venture Partners raised $40 million.

As of July 2024, Common Coliving filed for bankruptcy.

== See also ==
- Common Webster in Oakland, California
