= Envision Schools =

Bay Area network of high performing charter schools

Envision Education
- California

Information
- Type: Charter schools
- Founded: 2002
- Founder: Bob Lenz & Daniel McLaughlin
- Website: envisionschools.org

Envision Education is a Bay Area network of charter schools, founded in June 2002 by Daniel McLaughlin and Bob Lenz, that currently runs five public middle and high Envision Schools in the San Francisco Bay Area.

Envision also operates Envision Learning Partners, a coaching and training division working with schools across the country to adapt and adopt the Portfolio Defense model. ELP works with more than 1,000 educators in 30+ school networks and reaching more than 200,000 students.

== Investment ==
The Bill & Melinda Gates Foundation helped launch the school network with a $3 million investment in 2003 to form an initial group of five charter schools. In 2006, the foundation invested another $6.9 million aimed at helping the program duplicate its arts and technology programs.

== Schools ==
=== Current ===
- City Arts & Leadership Academy in San Francisco, opened in 2004 with an inaugural class of 100 freshmen. The school now has students in all four high school grades starting with the 2007-08 school year. CAT graduated its first class of seniors in 2008.
- Envision Academy of Arts & Technology in Oakland, California, opened in 2003. In the 2024-25 school year, it served about 200 students in grades 6-12.
- Impact Academy of Arts & Technology in Hayward, California, opened for 2007-08 with 125 students in grade 9. Today, it serves over 700 students in grades 6-12.

=== Combined with other Envision Schools ===
- Marin School of Arts and Technology (MSAT), Novato, California
- Metropolitan Arts and Technology Highschool, San Francisco, California
