= San Marin High School =

Public high school in California, United States

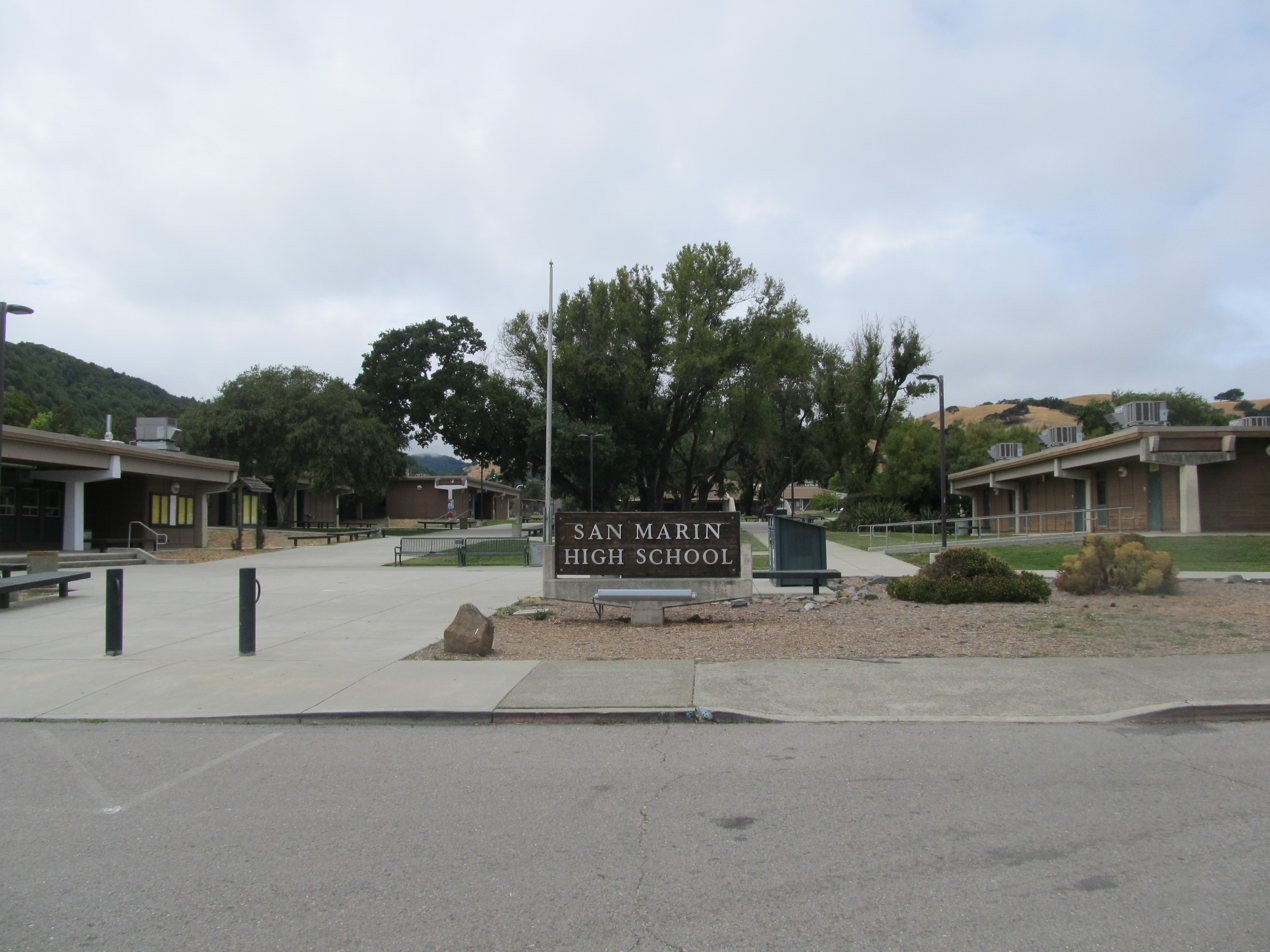

Location
- 15 San Marin Drive; Novato, California 94945; United States

Information
- School type: Public, high school
- Established: 1967
- School district: Novato Unified School District
- Superintendent: Tracy Smith
- CEEB code: 052172
- Principal: Andrew Boone
- Grades: 9-12
- Enrollment: 1,186 (2023–2024)
- Language: English
- Colors: Green & Gold
- Nickname: Mustangs
- Rival: Novato High School
- Publication: Mustang Messenger (newsletter)
- Newspaper: Pony Express
- Website: sanmarin.nusd.org

San Marin High School is a public secondary school located in Novato, California, in the United States.

== History ==
San Marin High School opened in 1968 in Novato.

Robert Vieth became principal in 2007, following the dismissal of the former principal by the District's board, which led to extended protests from parents, staff, and students. Vieth established the first code of conduct for student athletes and coaches in Marin County and began the San Marin Plus school-within-a-school program in 2010 for credit deficient students. Vieth announced his retirement plans in March 2011.

== Campus ==
The school occupies 39.6 acres (160,000 m^{2}), with a total of 51 classrooms, one gymnasium and one mini-gym, a student center, library, college and career center, media room, art department, gym, and science lab. Many facilities, except the gymnasiums, have recently been upgraded thanks to the Facility Bond. The seniors have a tradition of chalking their graduating class year on a hill on the north side of the school, named "Senior Hill".

Athletic facilities include tennis and basketball courts, baseball and softball diamonds, a soccer field, a newly upgraded artificial turf football field, and an all-weather track.

The school also has a STEM building. In regard to their STEM program, the building was built in the north-eastern campus area. Construction concluded in 2020 and was specifically meant for students who participated in the program. The classrooms were of the 'modern' structure, with TVs, chemistry labs, and group work opportunities built in. There is even a 'lounge' and more.

== Demographics ==
2023-2024

- 1,186 students: 649 male, 535 female

White	Hispanic	Asian	African American	Two or More Races	Filipino	Pacific Islander	American Indian	Not Reported
603	365	93	31	89	9	7	6	5
50.8%	30.9%	7.8%	1.1%	7.5%	0.8%	0.3%	0.5%	0.4%

== Curriculum ==
San Marin High School serves grades 9–12, and offers a comprehensive program of study to approximately 1040 students. San Marin has established educational objectives aimed at providing students with challenging learning experiences in academics, as well as providing assistance with choosing future educational and career choices. Students are given opportunities to take classes in performing arts, visual arts, athletics, Regional Occupational Program courses, Advanced Placement and Honors Courses, and Sheltered Courses. In particular, R.O.P. (Regional Occupational Program)(493 students), A.P. (453 students) and honors enrollment (140 students), has climbed dramatically.

STEM Programs – San Marin is notable for its strong and successful STEM (Science, Technology, Engineering, and Math) programs, including STEM Marin and the Biotechnology Academy. Both programs focus on preparing students for college and career through rigorous, hands-on, project-based learning experiences. STEM Marin was founded in 2013 and enrols sixty 9th graders every year. Students take two science or engineering courses and math each year. STEM Marin courses are blocked together in 9th and 10th grades: students take physics and engineering every day for two hours in 9th grade and biology and biotechnology during 10th grade. In 11th grade, students take chemistry and one STEM elective, and in 12th grade, students take senior capstone engineering and one STEM elective. In 2015, STEM Marin teacher Nick Williams won the prestigious Milken Educator Award.

Biotechnology Academy was founded in 2015, although there have been biotechnology courses at San Marin since 2009. Biotechnology Academy enrolls 60 9th graders each year, and students are cohorted together for technology of biology, English, and health/college and career readiness during 9th grade. Students are also cohorted together for chemistry of biotechnology and English 10th grade, and then take biotechnology 1 during 11th grade and biotechnology 2 during 12th grade.

San Marin High School was recognized as a 2017 California Gold Ribbon School for its STEM and arts programs.

The school has 62 teachers, 25 classified staff, and a regional occupational program. The school newspaper is called The Pony Express.

== Athletics ==
San Marin High School athletic teams participate in the North Coast Section and Marin County Athletic League programs. The school is known for its successful athletic program. San Marin has thirty-two sports teams and three seasons (Fall, Winter, Spring) of sports for girls and boys. The Sports Boosters is instrumental for raising funds for the athletic and sports programs at San Marin.

Fall Sports – Cross Country (Co-Ed Varsity), Football (Co-Ed, Frosh, JV, Varsity), Girls Tennis, Girls Volleyball (Frosh, JV, Varsity), Water Polo (Boys and Girls Varsity, Boys JV), Girls Golf and Co-Ed Sideline Cheerleading (JV & Varsity).

Winter Sports – Basketball (Frosh, JV, Varsity), Boys & Girls Wrestling, and Co-Ed Sideline Cheerleading (JV & Varsity) and Co-Ed Competitive Cheer. Soccer (Boys JV and Varsity & Girls JV and Varsity)

Spring Sports – Baseball (Boys Frosh, JV, Varsity), Lacrosse (Boys and Girls Varsity), Boys Golf, Softball (JV, Varsity), Swimming (Co-Ed), Boys Tennis, Track and Field (Co-Ed), and Boys Volleyball.

== Racial controversies ==
During the 1990s and early 2000s, San Marin received significant media coverage locally and nationally for the intolerant behavior of some students and parents.

Until it was banned in 1992, one of several themed annual "spirit days" was Slave Day. According to a 1999 Salon article written on the school's history, "students dressed in tattered clothes and chains were 'auctioned' to other students, whom they were then required to serve for the day." Images of this day from the 1987-1988 year book circulated in 2020, drawing shock from students and community members.

Reports of racial and ethnic intolerance began as early as 1995, when an American-born Asian-American senior at the school was beaten by a group of teenagers shouting racial slurs and telling him to go back to China. The one assailant who took responsibility was sentenced to 20 hours of community service.

In early 1998, a student yelled racial epithets at members of the visiting Tamalpais High School basketball team. In reaction to the slurs and actions committed by the San Marin High student, parents of four of the black students from Tamalpais filed suit against the Novato Unified School District, charging that a "climate of intolerance" was allowed at San Marin. The Marin County Athletic League put San Marin on probation for more than a year, citing its "hostile environment".

In the 1998–99 school year, San Marin received widespread media coverage after repeated incidents of hate crimes committed against one of their openly gay students. He was beaten by three youths off campus on September 15, 1998, soon after forming the Gay-Straight Alliance at San Marin. The Novato Police offered a reward, but the attackers were never identified. Some students at the school, which had been stressing tolerance at a series of "respect days" that year, spoke out in support of the victim, and 1000 students and faculty walked out of San Marin to show support for him and pride in their school. The next day, San Marin's principal was reassigned to a District office. Novato's city manager, Rod Wood, referred to "a small group of individuals who are fairly socially maladjusted", who identified themselves as white supremacists and called themselves "the hicks".

The school's behavior code was modified, outlining a range of punishments for racial/ethnic/sexual slurs, including reprimand, parental notification, detention on Saturday afternoon, expulsion, and police referral.

Misbehavior by the parents of a San Marin basketball player on February 2, 2008, in two games with Tam High teams led to drafting of the first code-of-conduct contracts for parents of athletes at a Marin County school. Following a girls junior varsity game at Tam, the mother of a San Marin player followed two referees, shouting obscene insults; later at San Marin, two parents of San Marin players confronted Tam's coach after he made a gesture indicating that the home team had choked. Novato police were called and the parents were later asked not to attend the remaining games of the season.

In 2022, the Novato Unified School District led a probe into a group of incidents where San Marin athletes used racial slurs during basketball and football games. The probe found “credible evidence” that San Marin athletes used racial slurs during games against San Rafael High, San Mateo High, and Tamalpais High.

== Notable alumni ==
- Karl Desseiroth (1988, although graduated elsewhere) - Awarded 2026 Nobel Prize in Medicine/Physiology.
- Kevin Hughes (1989) - Inducted into the World Wide Web Hall of Fame.
- Jalal Leach (1987), baseball player
- Mike Wise (1982) – NFL and UC Davis defensive end
- Richard Day (1980) – Hollywood writer and producer, best known for Mad About You and Arrested Development
- Brad Muster (1983) – NFL and Stanford University running back
- Bud Norris (2003) – MLB pitcher (Houston Astros, Baltimore Orioles, San Diego Padres, Atlanta Braves, Los Angeles Dodgers, Los Angeles Angels, St. Louis Cardinals)
- Brett Carolan (1989) – NFL tight end; Marin Athletic Foundation Outstanding Student Athlete
- Michael Kearney (1990) – graduated at age 6 after one year at San Marin; world's youngest college graduate
- Mike McCoy (1990) – NFL Head Coach (San Diego Chargers) and University of Utah quarterback
- Bret Bergmark (1992) – mixed martial artist
- Meagan McCray (2005) – Women's Professional Soccer goalkeeper
- Manny Wilkins (2013) – Arizona State Sun Devils football quarterback 2014-2018
- Brent Moore (1981) – linebacker for the Green Bay Packers
- Juan Alderete (1981) – Grammy Award-winning bassist for The Mars Volta and Marilyn Manson
- Ali Viola (1993) – NCAA All-American softball player and coach
- Matthew LaBounty (1987) - Defensive end drafted by the SF 49ers in 1992 then left in 1995 to play with the Gre,en bay Packers finishing his career with Bay Seattle Seahawks. At the time of graduation from Oregon, Matt was the all time sack leader.
- Taylor Schaub (2017) – Emmy-winning sports anchor and sideline reporter for Spectrum News 1, Spectrum SportsNet and SportsNet LA, covering Los Angeles professional and collegiate sports.
- Drew Gasparini (2004) – Songwriter and musical theatre composer/lyricist
