= Orinda Academy =

Location
- 19 Altarinda Road; Orinda, California 94563; United States; 37°53′02″N 122°11′00″W

Information
- Type: Private school
- Motto: Embracing Differences - Fulfilling Potential - Inspiring Success
- Established: 1982
- Teaching staff: 12.3 (on an FTE basis)
- Grades: 8 -12
- Enrollment: 54
- Student to teacher ratio: 6.2
- Campus: Suburban
- Colors: Navy, orange and gray, formerly Navy Blue and White/Gray
- Nickname: "Blue Jays", formerly "Eagles"
- Accreditation: Western Association of Schools and Colleges (WASC)
- Website: www.orindaacademy.org

Orinda Academy (OA) is a secondary school located in Orinda, California, United States.

== History ==
Orinda Academy, registered and formerly known as the North Bay Secondary School, is a private school that was founded in 1982.

=== Two Schools ===
In the mid 1980s, North Bay Secondary School split into two schools; Orinda Academy/North Bay Secondary School and North Bay Marin School but remained a single corporation with a single Board of Directors. In 1998, Orinda Academy legally separated from the North Bay Marin School. (The North Bay Marin School subsequently changed its name to The Marin School).

In 1994, Orinda Academy moved to its current site at 19 Altarinda Road, Orinda, with close proximity to the Orinda BART station. In 2003, North Bay Orinda School changed its name to Orinda Academy. The school is named after the city of Orinda in which it is located. In the spring of 2018, Ron Graydon, the founder of Orinda Academy and Head of School for 36 years retired. Dr. Susan Eva Porter, formerly of the Bay School of San Francisco, became the new Head of School. In June 2022, Nancy Rowland became the third Head of School.
