= The Marin School =

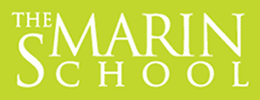

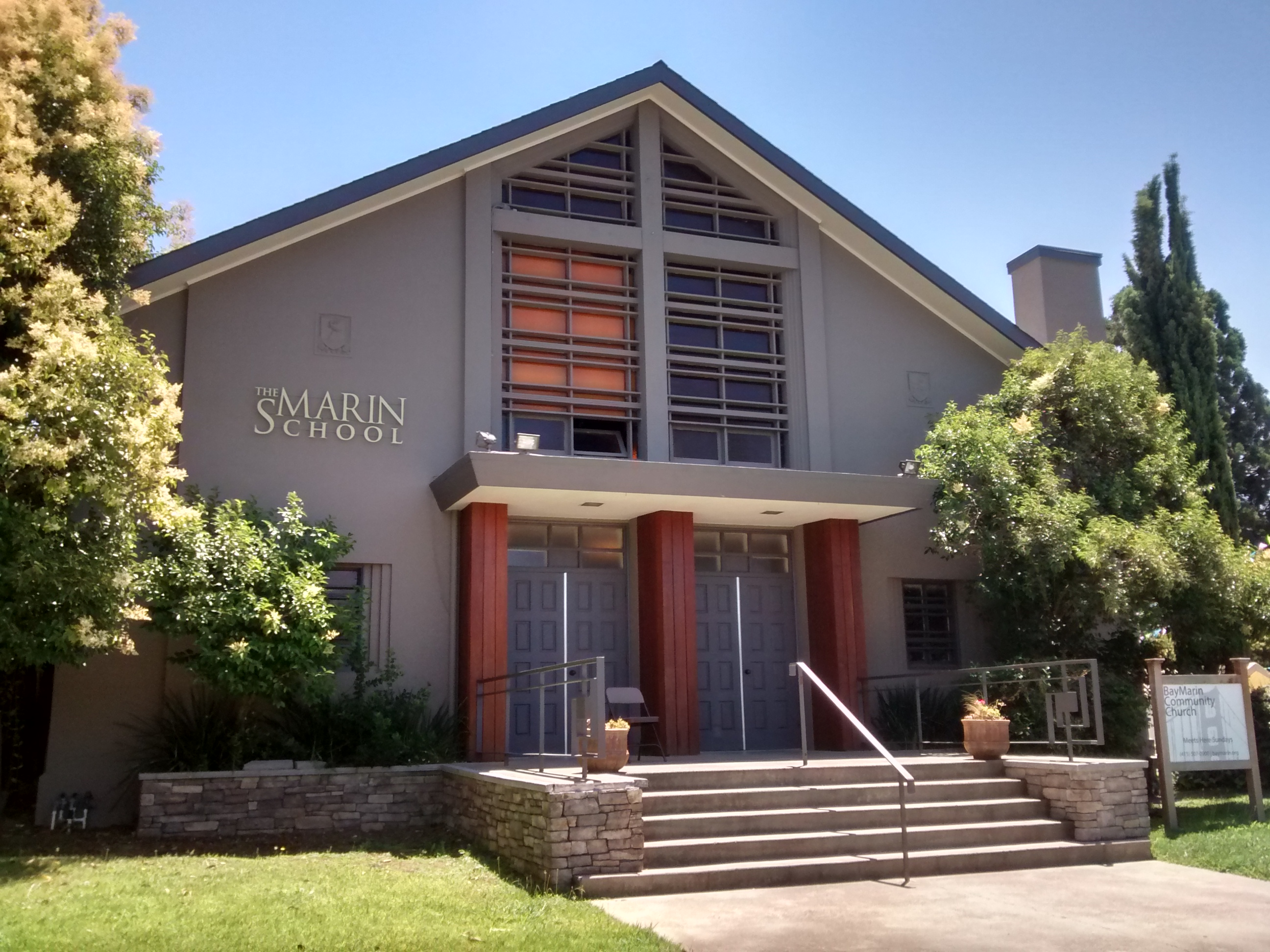

Location
- 150 N. San Pedro Road; San Rafael, Marin County, California 94903; United States
- Coordinates: 37°59′56.01″N 122°31′27.27″W

Information
- Type: Private
- Motto: Small School, Big Impact.
- Established: 1980
- Status: Closed
- Closed: 2023
- Principal: Ben Griggs
- Grades: 9-12
- Student to teacher ratio: 8:1
- Colors: Green and Black
- Sports: Soccer, Basketball, and Track
- Mascot: Nighthawks
- Nickname: TMS
- Accreditation: Western Association of Schools and Colleges (WASC)
- Website: TheMarinSchool.org

The Marin School (TMS) was a private high school located in San Rafael, California. The school was named after Marin County in which it is located. The school closed permanently at the end of 2022-23 school year, citing a drop in enrollment.

== History ==
The Marin School, formerly known as North Bay Secondary School then as North Bay Marin School, was founded in 1980 and originally included both a middle school and high school. The school accepted a wide range of students with varying levels of creativity, academic ability, and motivation. The school was characterized by small classes, close monitoring, and personalized attention given to each individual.

=== Two Schools ===
In the mid 1980s, the North Bay Marin School split into two schools (North Bay Marin School and North Bay Orinda School (now known as Orinda Academy)), but remained a single corporation with a single Board of Directors. In 1995, the former Head resigned, and the Board of Directors asked Barbara Schakel (a part-time English teacher hired in 1989) to assume the responsibilities of Head of School. In 1998, the North Bay Marin School legally separated from the North Bay Orinda School, established a separate non-profit corporation, and created a new board of directors.

=== Transformation ===
The Marin School, formerly classified as an alternative school, transformed into a college-preparatory school. The school's unique schedule of alternating tradition classroom education and a discussion workshop remained a key feature of the educational program. Barbara J. Brown, EdD, appointed at the beginning of the school year 2011–2012, was Head of School until 2020. In the Fall of 2020, Former Assistant Head of School Ben Griggs, M.Ed assumed leadership as Head of School until the school's closure at the end of the 22-23 school year.

== Curriculum ==
In recent years, The Marin School had expanded its curricular offerings and had a strong focus in technology and the arts. The school continued to offer small classes, individualized attention, experiential opportunities and an online tracking system that included daily assignments, biweekly grade updates and daily progress statistics. The “Outside the Walls” program, a series of curriculum-related field trips, was designed to give students a real-world application of their classroom.

== Enrollment ==
The school continued to enroll students with varied interests, learning styles and abilities from different socio-economic backgrounds. The school also supported 18% of its student body with financial assistance. The Marin School offered small classes with an average of eight students, a small student/teacher ratio, an experiential college-preparatory curriculum, and a focus on the individual.

== Closure ==
Student enrollment fell 25% over the school’s last two years of operation with 63 students enrolled at the end of the enrollment period for 2023-24. The school announced its closure at the end of the 2022-23 school year citing the low enrollment figures and subsequent budget concerns resulting from the lack of tuition revenue.
