= Marin Country Day School =

Coordinates: 37°55′10″N 122°29′28″W

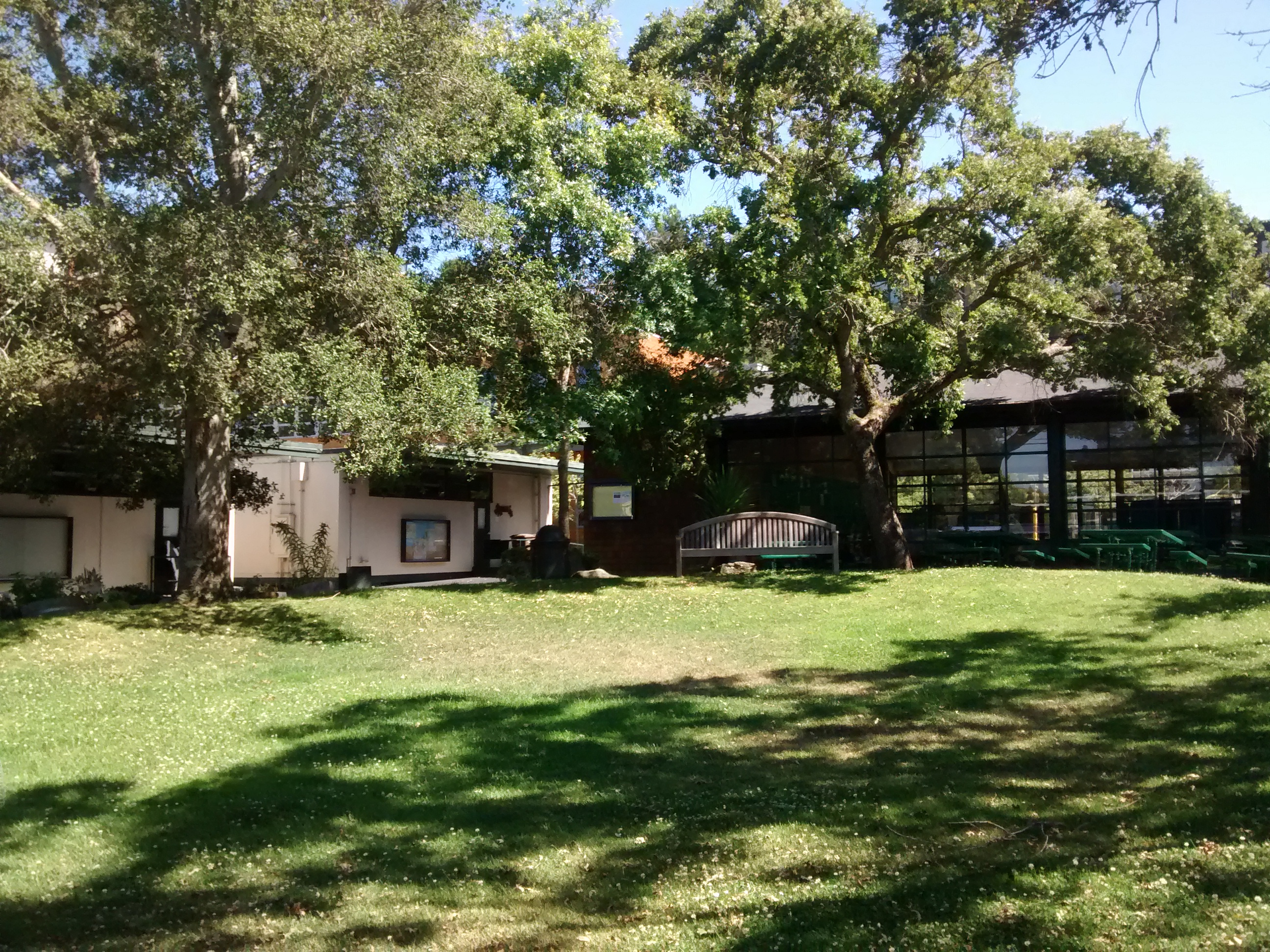
- Corte Madera, California; United States

Information
- Type: Independent
- Established: 1956
- Faculty: 70
- Enrollment: approx. 600
- Average class size: approx. 18 for lower school, 12 for upper school
- Student to teacher ratio: 8:1
- Campus: K-8,
- Athletics: 4 varsity sports, 3 club sports
- Tuition: $1,000-$42,980
- Website: mcds.org

Marin Country Day School is an independent coeducational day school serving grades K-8 located in Corte Madera, California. The student body is made up of approximately 600 students.

== History ==
The school was founded in 1956 by Barbara Mendenhall along with Dorothy McWilliams Cousins, sister of chef, Julia Child. The school originally consisted of circus tents located on a thirty-four-acre hillside overlooking the San Francisco Bay, which were given to the school by an anonymous donor. Eventually, money was found to build temporary classrooms, followed by the construction of permanent classrooms and related facilities.

During the 1950s and 1960s, the student body was under 300 students. The school was divided into an "upper school" and a "lower school". Facilities used by all students included an Assembly Room, Library, blacktop, playing field, riding ring and the Art and Music buildings. For sports purposes, each grade was divided into two teams, the "Blues" and the "Greens". Seventh graders spend a week camping in Joshua Tree. Eighth graders spend a week doing service learning in January each year. Eighth graders graduated on "Step-Up" day by moving up one tier on a set of wooden pilings built into a hillside between the Art and Music buildings. Two other long-standing traditions are the fall Book Fair to raise money for the school, and "Kite Day", which takes place in the Fall. Students, parents and friends of the school picnic and fly kites on the hillsides overlooking the main campus.

In the late 1960s, a large gymnasium and additional classrooms were constructed in the vicinity of the "upper field". The student body was enlarged, and a ninth grade class was added for several years. Then it was decided to go back to educating students only through the eighth grade.

In 1970, a boulder on an adjacent hillside had to be removed because of a crack that, during an earthquake, might have caused a large piece to fall on a building. The rock was six to eight feet across and was estimated to weigh in excess of two tons.

In 2007, MCDS began its most recent project of rebuilding the admissions office and creating more classrooms.

In 2012, MCDS started a funded project to create a Physical Education Pavilion. It was completed in the end of April 2012.

As more money continued to flow into the school's system, they were able to establish more connections with which to aid their students. In the early 1990s, they began programs such as Beyond Borders and a science and technology initiative, securing their place as a large and influential member of the area's community for years to come.

== Campus ==
35 acres (140,000 m^{2}); 34 Classrooms, Science Laboratories, Computer Laboratory, Music and Art Buildings, Library, Performing Arts Auditorium, Marine Science Dock, Gymnasium, P.E. Pavilion, Multipurpose Room, Makers' Lab, MCDS/PM and ASAP Headquarters.

== Enrollment ==
598 in Grades K-8 59% from Marin County, 39% from San Francisco, 2% from East Bay and Sonoma.

== Present ==
In later years, the school upgraded its music facilities and added a theater program. At the end of the school year, the eight graders have an option to participate in a play. The ones who choose not to participate can choose another activity that lasts for the last two and a half weeks of school such as marine exploration or outdoor ed. Bay front property was purchased to expand the campus eastward across Paradise Drive. Today, Marin Country Day School has a larger student body of 540 students.

The year 2006 was MCDS' 50th anniversary and the school had planned a year-long celebration of this milestone.

== Creek restoration ==
In 2009 MCDS completed the first phase of the restoration of a creek that runs along the eastern border of the campus. The ephemeral creek was lined with a concrete channel in areas and flooded during heavy rain events. The restoration focused on removing the concrete lining, dropping the elevation of the channel to hold the 100-year flood volume, and planting native riparian and wetland vegetation in the creek and along its banks.

WRA environmental consultants obtained the regulatory agency permits, prepared the creek restoration and monitoring plan, and the landscape planting plans, Clearwater Hydrology prepared the new creek engineering design, and Native Sons Nursery planted the creek.

WRA is now working with the science department to integrate the required 5-year restoration monitoring into the 7th grade science curriculum.
