= Novato High School =

Coordinates: 38°05′23″N 122°34′22″W

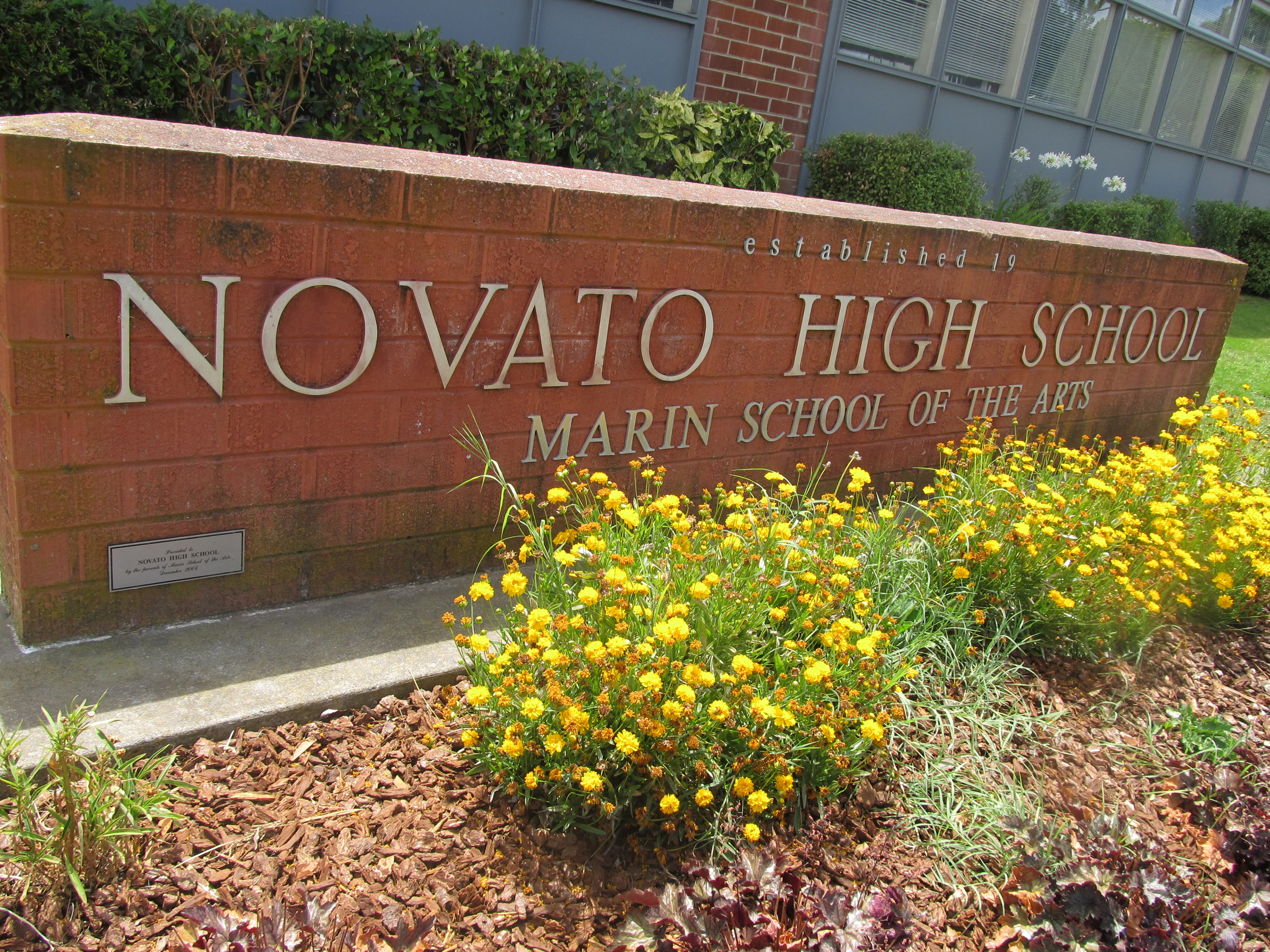

Location
- 625 Arthur St. Novato, CA; Novato, Marin County, CA 94947; United States

Information
- School type: Public, comprehensive high school, Art school
- Founded: 1957
- School district: Novato Unified School District
- Oversight: WASC
- Superintendent: Tracy Smith
- CEEB code: 052170
- Principal: Michelle Cortez, Allie Greene (co-principals)
- Teaching staff: 64.71 (FTE)
- Grades: 9-12
- Student to teacher ratio: 21.53
- Classrooms: 56
- Campus: 38-acre site
- Campus type: Outdoor Hallways, Suburban
- Colors: Black & Gold
- Mascot: Hornets, Servals (MSA)
- Nickname: The Black Swarm
- Rivals: San Marin Mustangs
- Newspaper: Wax and Honey
- Yearbook: The Vespa
- Website: novatohigh.nusd.org

Novato High School (NHS) is a public high school located in Novato, California, in Marin County. It is home to Marin School of Arts and is part of the Novato Unified School District.

== History ==
Built in 1955 and founded in 1957 three years before Novato was incorporated as a city, it is one of two comprehensive high schools in the Novato Unified School District, the other being San Marin High School.

== Demographics ==
Since the mid-1980s, the school's student population has ranged from 1000 to 1200 students. In the 2018–2019 school year, the demographic distribution was as follows: Caucasian (46.7%), Latino (38.1%), Asian/Other Asian (6.2%), Two or More Races (4.7%), African American (2.8%), Native American (1.1%) and Pacific Islander (0.4%).

== Campus ==
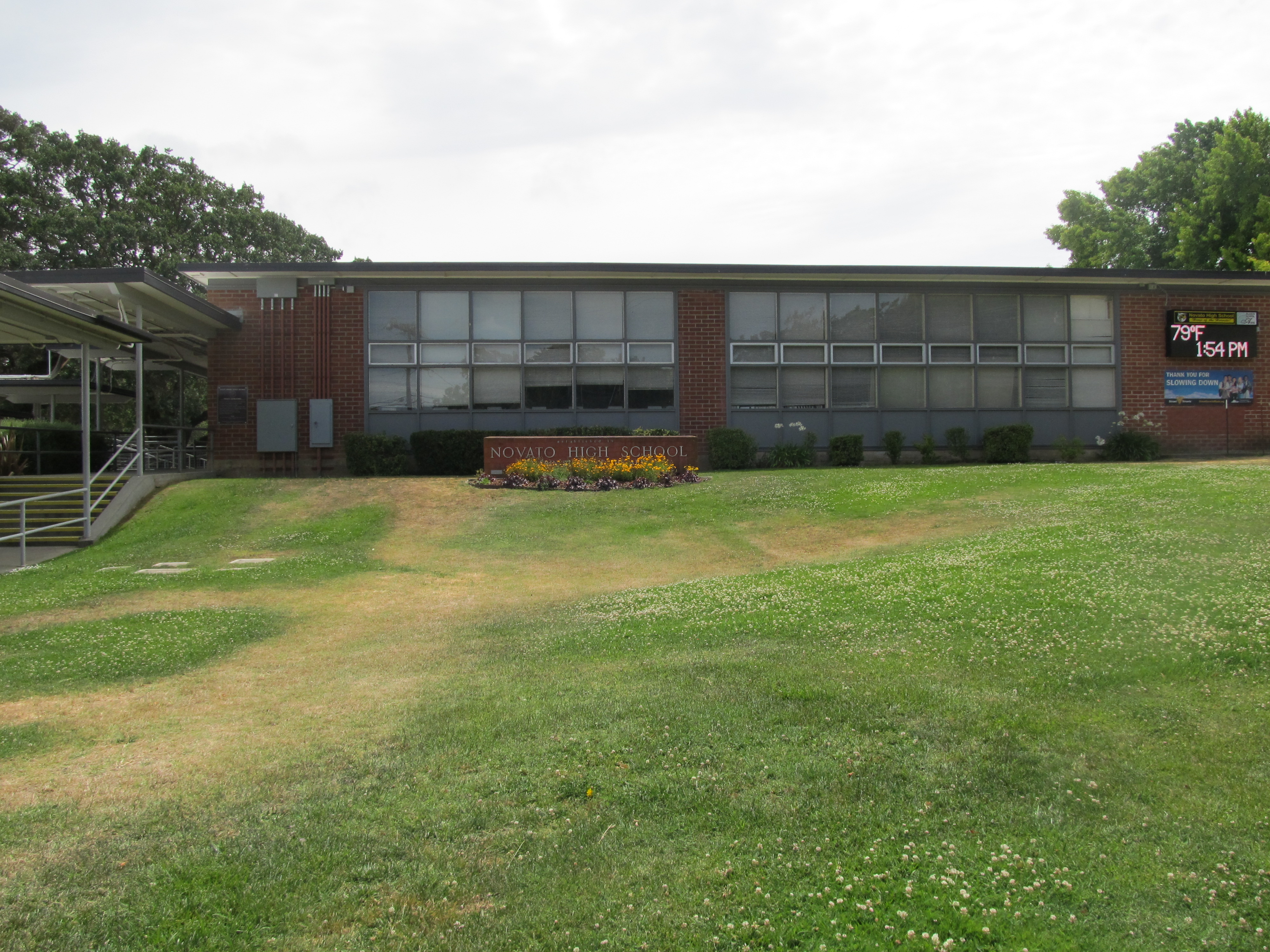
Novato High School

NHS rests on a 38-acre site, with two gymnasiums, a state-of-the-art science center, two performing arts centers (including a state-of-the-art theater completed in 2021), five computer centers, a library with a computer lab, dance studio, weight room, locker rooms, a wing for visual art classrooms, and a wing for music classrooms. Outdoor facilities include tennis courts, basketball courts, softball diamond, baseball stadium, turf football stadium with a track, soccer field, and a newly renovated swimming pool.

Another student-led organization on campus is the Link Crew (since 2015). Link Crew has 11 and 12 grade students act as mentors and role models for the incoming 9 grade class to help in the transition from middle to high school.

== Curriculum ==
Novato High School offers a range of academic programs, including college preparatory courses, Honors and Advanced Placement (AP) classes, as well as fine and performing arts and industrial arts courses. The school provides support services such as English Language Development (ELD) programs for students who require additional language assistance.

Marin School of the Arts (MSA) is an arts program on Novato High School's campus; in addition to arts classes in their field of choice, MSA students also take regular Novato High School academic classes. MSA was founded in 2003 by Mark Peabody.

== Athletics ==
Novato competes in the Marin County Athletic League (MCAL). Novato is a member of the North Coast Section (NCS) of the California Interscholastic Federation.

=== Baseball ===
Varsity most recently won MCAL in 2026. They last won NCS in 2007.

=== Basketball ===
The girls' basketball program won the California state Div. II championship in the 1986 season.

=== Football ===
The Novato football team has won 4 NCS titles (2002, 2004, 2006 & 2007) and came runner up in the Division II State Championship in 2007. They last won MCAL in 2014.

== Notable alumni ==
- Martin Baccaglio (1962), NFL defensive end from San José State
- Amory Kane (1964), recording artist
- Mike Moroski (1975), NFL quarterback from UC Davis
- Yvonne Cagle (1977), NASA Astronaut
- Eric Richardson (1980), NFL wide receiver from San José State
- Eric Shanower (1981), author and cartoonist
- John Kostecki (1982), Olympic sailor
- Frank Robinson (1987), NFL defensive back from Boise State
- Tim Cantor (1987), painter and writer
- Seth Morris (1988), actor and comedian
- Ellen Estes (1996), Olympic water polo player
- Anna Wise (2009), singer known best for collaborating with Kendrick Lamar
- Wil Dasovich (2009), television personality, model and YouTube vlogger
- Arden Jones (2019), musical artist
- Kane Parsons (2023), film director and VFX artist

== Notable faculty ==
- Former Stanford All American and Chicago Bears defensive lineman Roger Stillwell coached the varsity football team in the 1980s.
- The Rock Band program is run by Scott Thunes, bassist for Frank Zappa.
