= Headlands Preparatory School =

Private school in Sausalito, California

Location
- Sausalito, Marin County, California; United States
- Coordinates: 37.8588619°N 122.4862185°W

Information
- Former name: Tilden Preparatory School Marin
- Religious affiliation: Nonsectarian
- Established: 2017
- Head of school: Dan Rogoff
- Grades: 6-12
- Enrollment: c. 40
- Average class size: 1
- Colors: Orange and green
- Executive Director: Kristie Moore-Arauz
- Founding Director: Rebecca Hobbs
- Website: https://headlandsprep.com/

Headlands Preparatory School, (Note: Often called Headlands Prep, HPS, or simply Headlands) originally known as Tilden Preparatory School Marin, is a WASC-accredited alternative private school for grades 6 to 12 located in Sausalito, California. It has approximately 40 students enrolled as of 2026.

== History ==
Headlands Preparatory School was founded in 2017 as Tilden Preparatory School Marin, as a branch of Tilden Preparatory School, located in Albany. In 2020, Tilden Preparatory School Marin changed its name to Headlands Preparatory School.

== Unique teaching system ==
Headlands specializes in teaching students with learning disabilities, such as ADHD, autism, dyslexia, and 2E students. As such, the school utilizes a unique teaching system that involves 1 on 1 classes, (Note: This means that the core classes consist of just 1 teacher and 1 student; non core classes, such as study hall, art, and PE, consist of 3-6 students) as well as flexible curriculums and student schedules, allowing students to learn at their own pace.
