= Old Mill School (Mill Valley, California) =

Coordinates: 37°54′21″N 122°33′09″W

- 352 Throckmorton Avenue; Mill Valley, CA 94941

Information
- Type: Public
- Established: 1921
- School district: Mill Valley School District
- Principal: Jason Matlon
- Grades: K - 5
- Enrollment: 333
- Colors: Red and Black
- Information: (415) 389-7727
- Website: om.mvschools.org

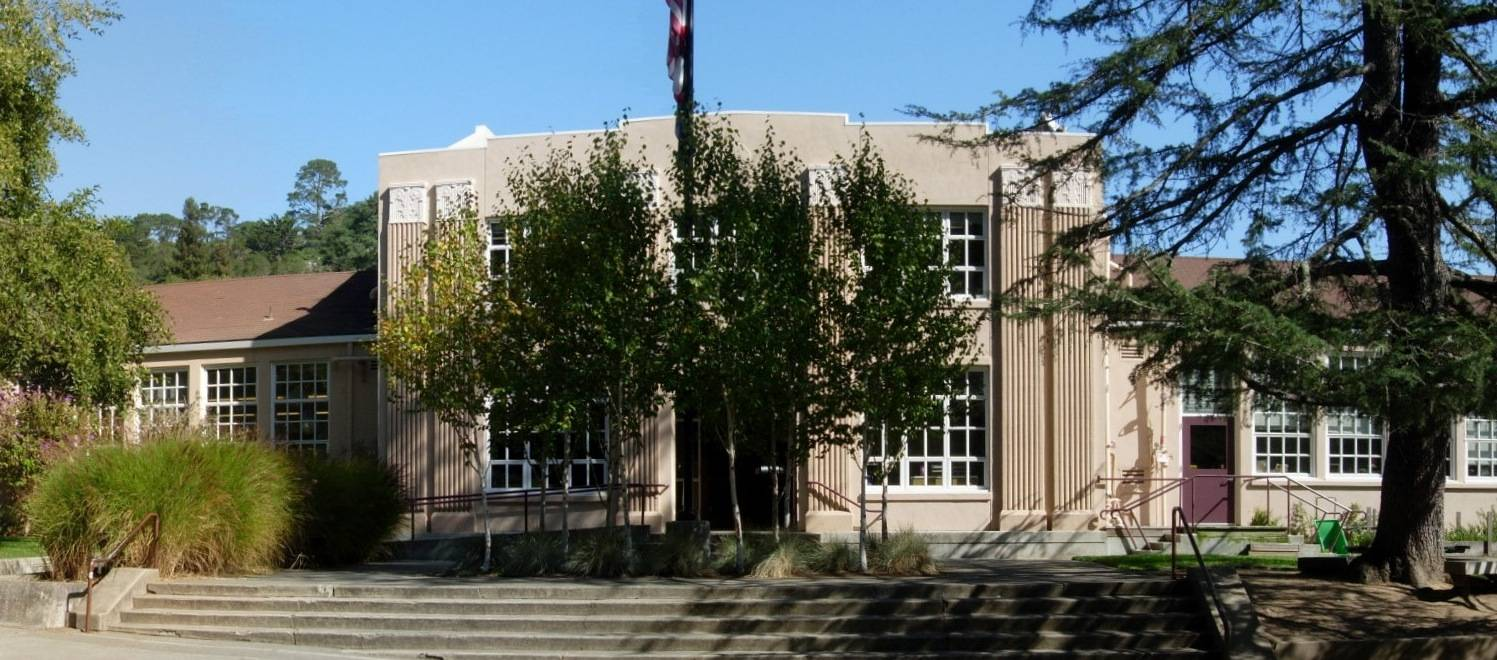

Old Mill School is one of 5 public elementary schools in Mill Valley, California, along with Park, Tamalpais Valley, Edna Maguire, and Strawberry Point Schools. The main building, built in 1921, is the oldest existing public elementary school building in Mill Valley. At the beginning of the 2015 school year, there were 333 students at Old Mill in kindergarten through 5th grades, and 14 grade-level teachers assisted by subject-specific teachers and teacher's aides.

== History ==
- In 1918 school trustees purchased a 2.5-acre (10,000 m^{2}) lot bordered by Old Mill Street, Elma Street, Lovell Avenue, and Throckmorton Avenue to build a new school to replace the Summit School.
- On November 19, 1921 Old Mill School opened. Total construction cost, including equipment, was $85,000.
- In the 1930s Old Mill received a seismic retrofit along with the addition of classrooms 1, 2, and 3 on the Elma Street side of the school.
- In the late 1950s classrooms 9, 10, 11, and 12 were added on the Old Mill Street side of the school.
- In 1995 Old Mill School underwent a major, 3-year renovation, including the addition of a new library/multimedia center, an art/science facility, a new gymnasium/auditorium, and a new administration core.
- In 1997 two new modular classrooms were added on the Elma Street side of the upper yard because of a class size reduction policy adopted by the Mill Valley School District.
- Old Mill School celebrated its 100th anniversary Nov 19, 2021.

== Trivia ==
- In 1925 Helen Keller, through her long-time teacher Anne Sullivan, gave a talk to an audience of 200 at Old Mill School.
- George Cory, composer of I Left My Heart in San Francisco, was a student at Old Mill School.
- A sulphur spring well once existed beneath what is now the lower playground.

== Awards ==
- 1989, 1993, 1998 - California Distinguished School Award
- 2005, 2006 - CBEE Foundation and Just for the Kids - California Public Schools Honor Roll
