= Novato Unified School District =

School district in California, United States

Address
- 1015 Seventh Street Novato, California, 94945; United States

District information
- Type: Public
- Grades: K–12
- NCES District ID: 0627720

Students and staff
- Students: 7,206
- Teachers: 336.98
- Staff: 323.97
- Student–teacher ratio: 21.38

Other information
- Website: www.nusd.org

The Novato Unified School District is a school district in Novato, California.

It includes Novato and Black Point-Green Point.

== Schools ==
=== Preschools ===
- Ready, Set, Grow! (Early Education) (located at Rancho Elementary)
- YMCA Early Learning (Preschool) (located at San Rafael YMCA)

=== Elementary schools ===
- Hamilton School (K–8)
- Loma Verde Elementary School
- Lu Sutton Elementary School
- Lynwood Elementary School
- Olive Elementary School
- Pleasant Valley Elementary School
- Rancho Elementary School
- San Ramon Elementary School

=== Middle schools ===
- Sinaloa Middle School
- San Jose Intermediate School
- Hamilton School (K–8)

=== High schools ===
- San Marin High School
- Novato High School, including the Marin School of the Arts

=== Alternative education ===
- Marin Oaks High School
- Hill Education Center
- NOVA Independent Study
- Novato Charter School
- VLA (virtual learning academy)

=== Former schools ===
- Hill Middle School was reopened with 6th and 7th grade students at the start of the 1991-92 school year due to enrollment growth in the school district. Michael Watenpaugh was the principal who reopened the school. Hill Middle School was designated as a California Distinguished School in 1993. Hill Middle School closed in 2011, with the campus becoming the Hill Education Center
