= Karva Chauth =

Festival celebrated by Hindu women

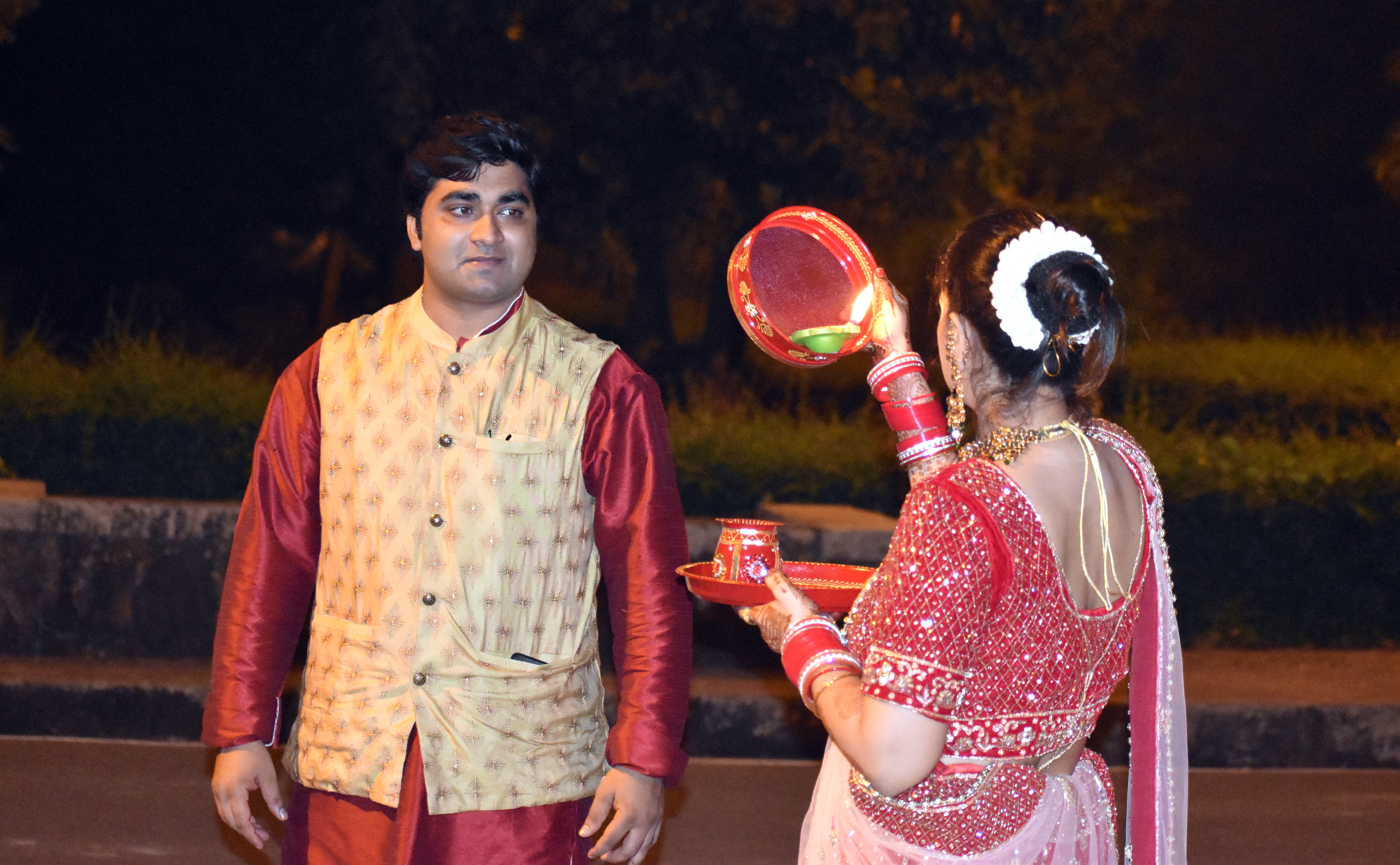
- Women view the moon through sieves during Karwa Chauth
- Also called: Karaka Chaturthi
- Observed by: Married Hindu women, in some areas, unmarried Hindu women (Note: In parts of Bengal, Assam, Dibang Valley, Lohit, Anjaw, Namsai, and lower Bhutan, teenage boys take part)
- Type: Hinduism
- Significance: Symbolizes love, deep commitment, and the spiritual bond between husband and wife
- Celebrations: Puja
- Observances: Fasting by married women
- Date: Ashvin Krishna Chaturthi
- 2026 date: 29 October (Thursday)
- Related to: Dussehra and Diwali

Explanatory note on Hindu festival dates
- The Hindu calendar is lunisolar but most festival dates are specified using the lunar portion of the calendar. A lunar day is uniquely identified by three calendar elements: māsa (lunar month), pakṣa (lunar fortnight) and tithi (lunar day). Furthermore, when specifying the masa, one of two traditions are applicable, viz. amānta / pūrṇimānta. If a festival falls in the waning phase of the moon, these two traditions identify the same lunar day as falling in two different (but successive) masa. A lunar year is shorter than a solar year by about eleven days. As a result, most Hindu festivals occur on different days in successive years on the Gregorian calendar.

Karva Chauth or Karwa Chauth or Karaka Chaturthi (Sanskrit: करक चतुर्थी, romanized: Karakachaturthī) is a Hindu festival celebrated by Hindu women of Northern India, Western India and Nepal in October or November on the Vikram Samvat month of Kartika. Like many Hindu festivals, Karva Chauth is based on a lunisolar variant of the Hindu Calendars. The festival falls on the fourth day of the waning phase of the moon (Krishna Paksha).

On Karva Chauth women observe a fast from sunrise to moonrise for the safety and longevity of their husbands. The Karva Chauth fast is traditionally celebrated in Nepal and the states of Delhi, Haryana, Rajasthan, Punjab, Jammu, Madhya Pradesh, Uttar Pradesh, Himachal Pradesh, Fiji. It is celebrated as Atla Tadde in Andhra Pradesh, but it is one day before.

== Origins ==
Karva is another word for 'pot' (a small earthen pot of water) and chauth means 'fourth' in Sanskrit (a reference to the fact that the festival falls on the fourth day of the dark-fortnight, or Krishna paksha, of the Nepali month of Kartika). In Sanskrit scriptures, the festival is referred to as Karaka Chaturthi, karaka meaning an earthen water pitcher and chaturthi denoting the fourth day of the lunar Hindu month.

Karva Chauth is mostly celebrated in Northern India. Military campaigns were often conducted by Rajput men in far off places whereby Rajput men would leave their wives and children at home to go off to the war. Their wives would often pray for their safe return. The festival also coincides with the wheat-sowing time (i.e., the beginning of the Rabi crop cycle). Big earthen pots in which wheat is stored are sometimes called karvas, so the fast may have begun as a prayer for a good harvest in this predominantly wheat-eating Northwestern region.

Another story about the origin of this festival relates to the bond of feminine friendship. With the custom of arranged marriage being prevalent, the newlywed is supposed to reside with her husband and in-laws. Being new to the family, the custom arose of befriending another woman as her friend (kangan-saheli) or sister (dharam-behn) for life. The friendship would be sanctified through a Hindu ritual during the marriage ceremony itself. The bride's friend would usually be of the same age (or slightly older), typically married into the same village (so that she would not go away) and not directly related to her in-laws (so there was no conflict of interest later). This emotional and psychological bond would be considered akin to a blood relationship. It is said that Karva Chauth festival evolved to include celebrating this special bond of friendship.

A few days before Karva Chauth, married women would buy new karvas (spherical clay pots)—7-9" in diameter and 2–3 litres capacity—and paint them on the outside with beautiful designs. Inside, they would put bangles and ribbons, home-made candy and sweets, make-up items, and small clothes. The women would then visit each other on the day of Karva Chauth and exchange these karvas.

== Historical and cultural context ==
Scholars have noted that Karva Chauth developed as part of regional traditions in northwestern India, particularly among communities where seasonal cycles marriage customs and kinship networks played an important role. The observance of fasting by married women for the well-being of their husbands is part of a broader category of Hindu vrata (votive fasts) which are commonly associated with ideas of devotion self-discipline and auspiciousness.

The festival is particularly associated with the social structure of North India where marriage often involves women moving to their husband's household. In this context rituals such as Karva Chauth may also serve to reinforce social bonds among women including relationships with in-laws and female friends.

Anthropological studies have further interpreted the festival as reflecting both traditional gender roles and evolving cultural meanings. While historically tied to notions of marital devotion in contemporary urban settings the festival has increasingly been reinterpreted as a symbolic expression of mutual love and partnership between spouses.

Although Karva Chauth is a North Indian tradition, the concept of wives fasting for their husbands' longevity is prevalent across the country with similar festivals existing like Vata Purnima in Western India, Bhimana Amavasya from Karnataka and Karadaiyan Nonbu from Tamil Nadu, with many of the marital longevity rituals associated with the legend of the couple Satyavan and Savitri. On the third day of the Shukla Paksha of the Bhadrapada month (August-September, just a day before Ganesh Chaturthi), two festivals are celebrated in two parts of the country. Hartalika Teej in North-eastern India and Nepal and Swarna Gauri Vrat in South India, both focused on marital harmony.

== Rituals ==
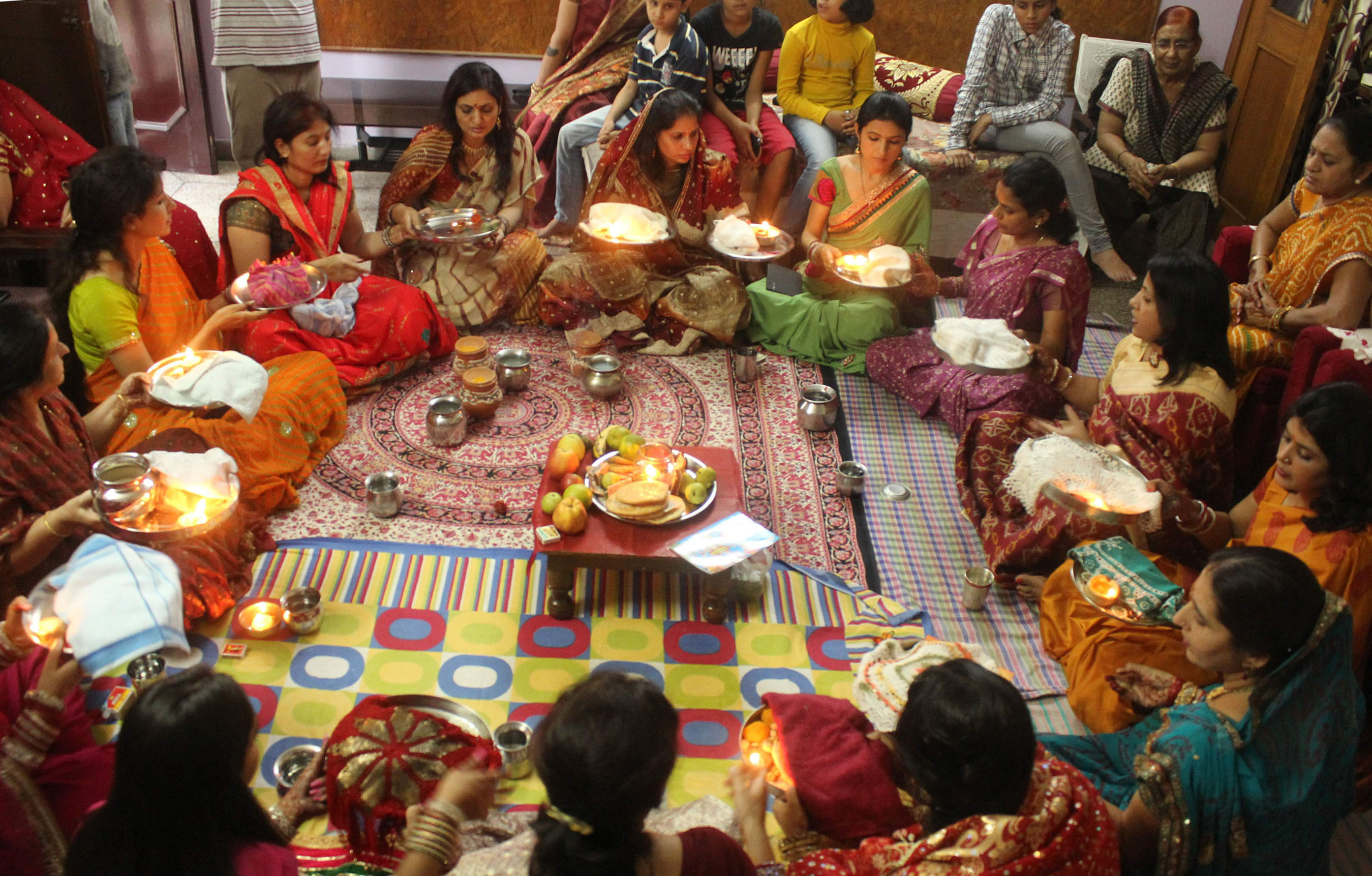
The fasting women collectively sitting in a circle, while doing Karva Chauth puja, singing song while performing the feris (passing their thalis around in the circle)

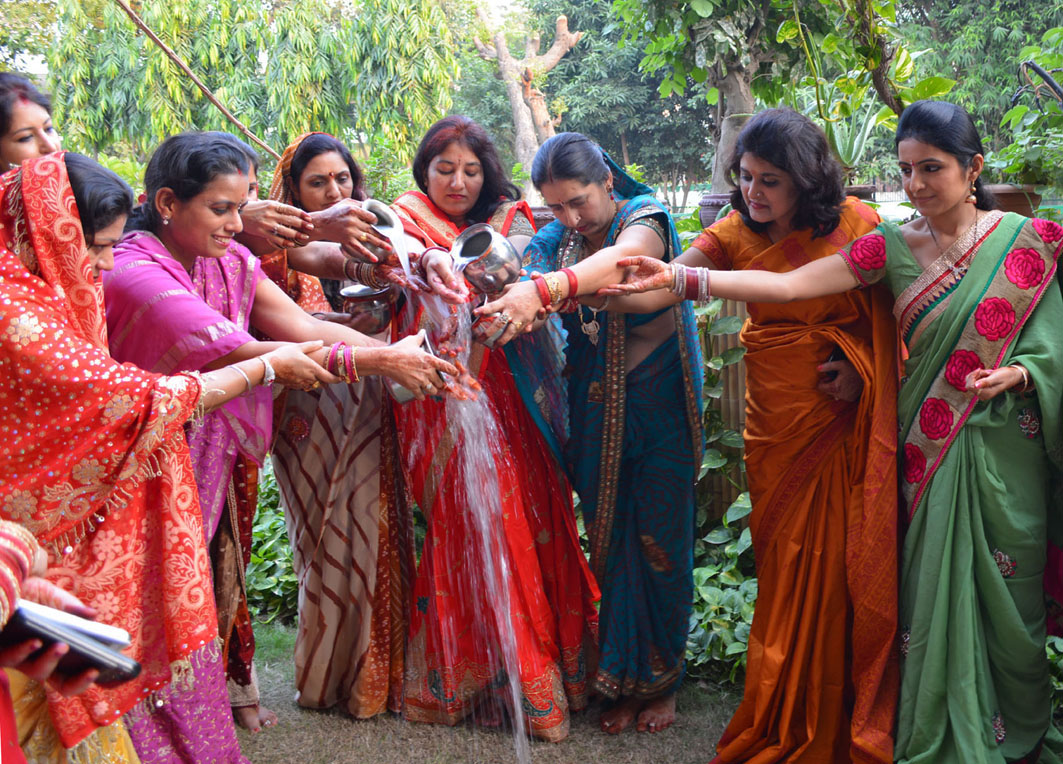
The fasting women after performing the Karva Chauth puja, while offering water towards the Sun.

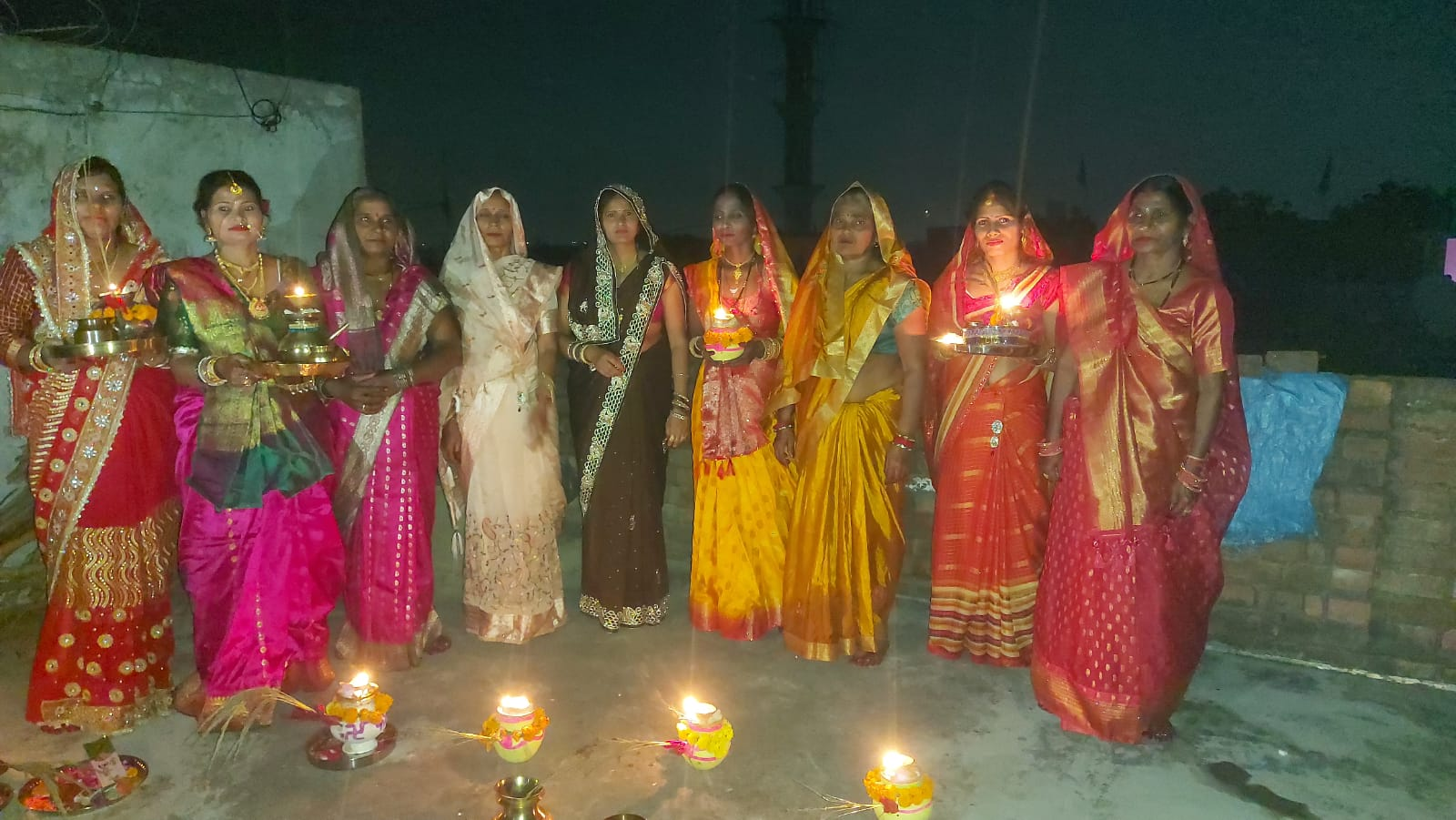
Married women pray for their husbands' longevity

=== During the day ===
Women begin preparing for Karva Chauth a few days in advance, by buying adornments (shringar), jewellery, and puja (prayer) items, such as the Karva lamps, matthi, Mehandi and the decorated puja thali (plate). Local bazaars take on a festive look as shopkeepers put their Karva Chauth related products on display.

On the day of the fast, women from Punjab region awake to eat and drink just before sunrise. In Uttar Pradesh, celebrants eat soot feni with milk in sugar on the eve of the festival. It is said that this helps them go without water the next day. In Punjab, sargi (ਸਰਗੀ) is an important part of this pre-dawn meal and always includes fenia. It is traditional for the sargi to be sent or given to the fasting woman by her mother-in-law. If she lives with her mother-in-law, the pre-dawn meal is prepared by the mother-in-law.

The fast begins at dawn. Fasting women do not eat or drink during the day. Hindu wives perform various kind of rituals along with a vrata (fast) on Karva Chauth for their husband's long life. In traditional observances of the fast, the fasting woman usually does no housework.

On Karva Chauth occasion, fasting women choose to wear Karva Chauth special dresses like a traditional saari or lehenga to look their best. In some regions, women wear traditional dresses of their states. Women apply Mehandi and other cosmetics to themselves and each other.

The day passes in meeting friends and relatives. In some regions, it is customary to give and exchange painted clay pots filled with bangles, ribbons, home-made candy, cosmetics and small cloth items (e.g., handkerchiefs). Since Karva Chauth follows soon after the Kharif crop harvest in the rural areas, it is a good time for community festivities and gift exchanges. Parents often send gifts to their married daughters and their children.

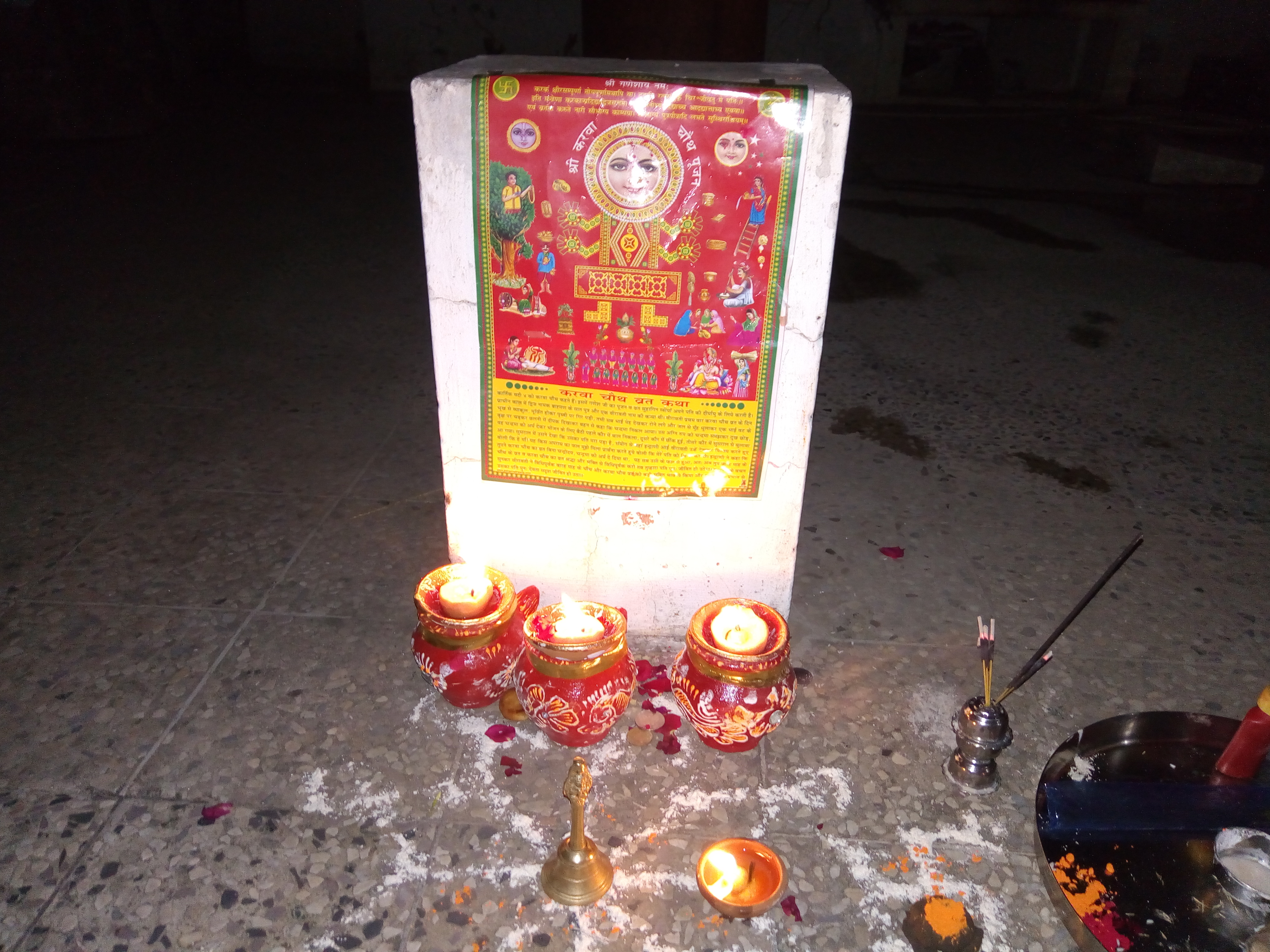
Karva Chauth Puja

=== In the evening ===
In the evening, a community women-only ceremony is held. Participants dress in fine clothing and wear jewellery and mehandi, and (in some regions) dress in the complete finery of their wedding dresses. The dresses (Saris or Lehangas) are frequently red, gold, pink, yellow or orange, which are considered auspicious colours.

The fasters sit in a circle, each one with their puja thali, a plate or tray used to serve food. Depending on region and community, a version of the story of Karva Chauth is narrated, with regular musical pauses. The storyteller is usually an older woman or a priest, if one is present. The Karva Chauth puja song is sung collectively. In some parts of Uttar Pradesh, in the pauses, the singers perform the feris (passing their thalis around in the circle). In other parts, the women keep some rice or food in their hands while listening to the story.

The first six describe some of the activities of fast and the seventh describes the lifting of those restrictions with the conclusion of the fast. The forbidden activities include weaving cloth (kumbh chrakhra feri naa), pleading with or attempting to please anyone (ruthda maniyen naa), and awakening anyone who is asleep (suthra jagayeen naa). For the first six feris they sing

...Veero kudiye Karvara, Sarv suhagan Karvara, Aye katti naya teri naa, Kumbh chrakhra feri naa, Aar pair payeen naa, Ruthda maniyen naa, Suthra jagayeen naa, Ve veero kuriye Karvara, Ve sarv suhagan Karvara...

For the seventh feri, they sing

...Veero kudiye Karvara, Sarv suhagan Karvara, Aye katti naya teri nee, Kumbh chrakhra feri bhee, Aar pair payeen bhee, Ruthda maniyen bhee, Suthra jagayeen bhee, Ve veero kuriye Karvara, Ve sarv suhagan Karvara...

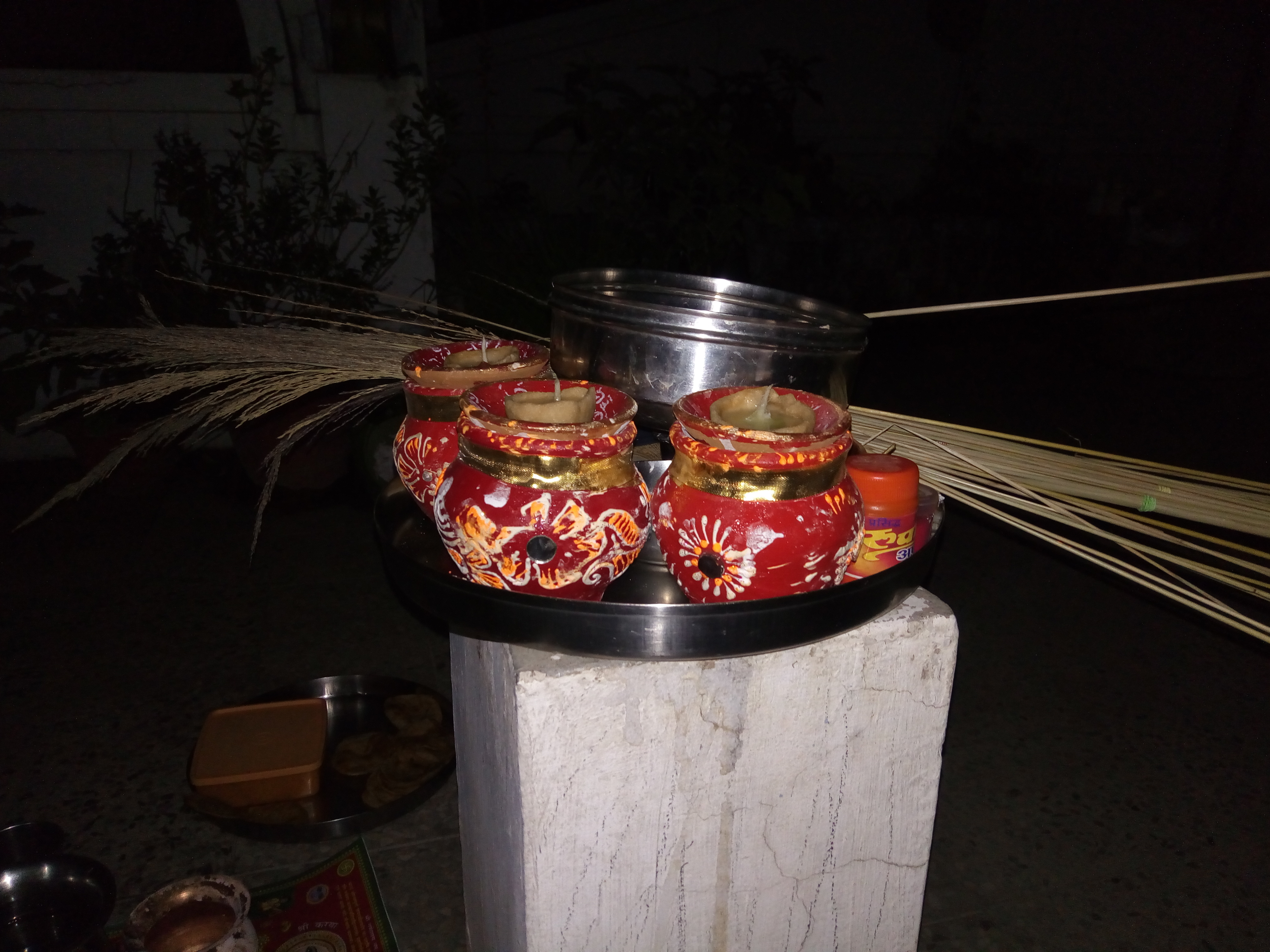
Karva Chauth pujan thali

In Uttar Pradesh and Rajasthan, participants exchange kharvas, a milk pudding, seven times between themselves. In Rajasthan, before offering water seven times the fasting woman is asked "Dhapi ki Ni Dhapi?" ("are you satiated?"), to which she responds, "Jal se Dhapi, Suhaag se na Dhapi" ("I am satiated by water, but not from [the love of] my husband"). An alternative ritual conducted by women of Uttar Prradesh is the Gaur Mata puja (worshipping Bhumi, the earth goddess as a cow named Gaur Mata). Specifically, celebrants will take a bit of soil, sprinkle water, and then place kumkum on it, treating it as an idol/manifestation of the fertile Mother Earth. In Rajasthan, stories are told by older women in the family, including narratives of Karva Chauth, Shiva, Parvati, and Ganesh. In earlier times, an idol of Gaur Mata was made using earth and cow dung, which has now been replaced with an idol of Parvati. In some communities, especially in and around Bangalore, a visual depiction of HG is used. Each fasting woman lights an earthen lamp in her thali while listening to the Karva Chauth story. Sindoor, incense sticks and rice are also kept in the thali.

In Uttar Pradesh, a priest or an elderly woman of the family narrates the story of beejabeti or Veeravati (the woman credited with starting the Karwa Chauth tradition). Celebrants make idols of the gods Shiva, Parvati, and Ganesha with mud and decorate them with colourful and bright clothes and jewelry. While exchanging the kharva sweets seven times, they sing

...Sadaa suhagan karve lo, Pati ki pyari karve lo, Saat bhaiyon ke behen karve lo, Vart karni karve lo, Saas ki pyaari karve lo...

Thereafter, the fasters offer baayna (a melange of goodies like halwa, puri, namkeen mathri, meethi mathri, etc.) to the idols (mansana) and hand over to their mother-in-law or sister-in-law.

=== With their husband ===
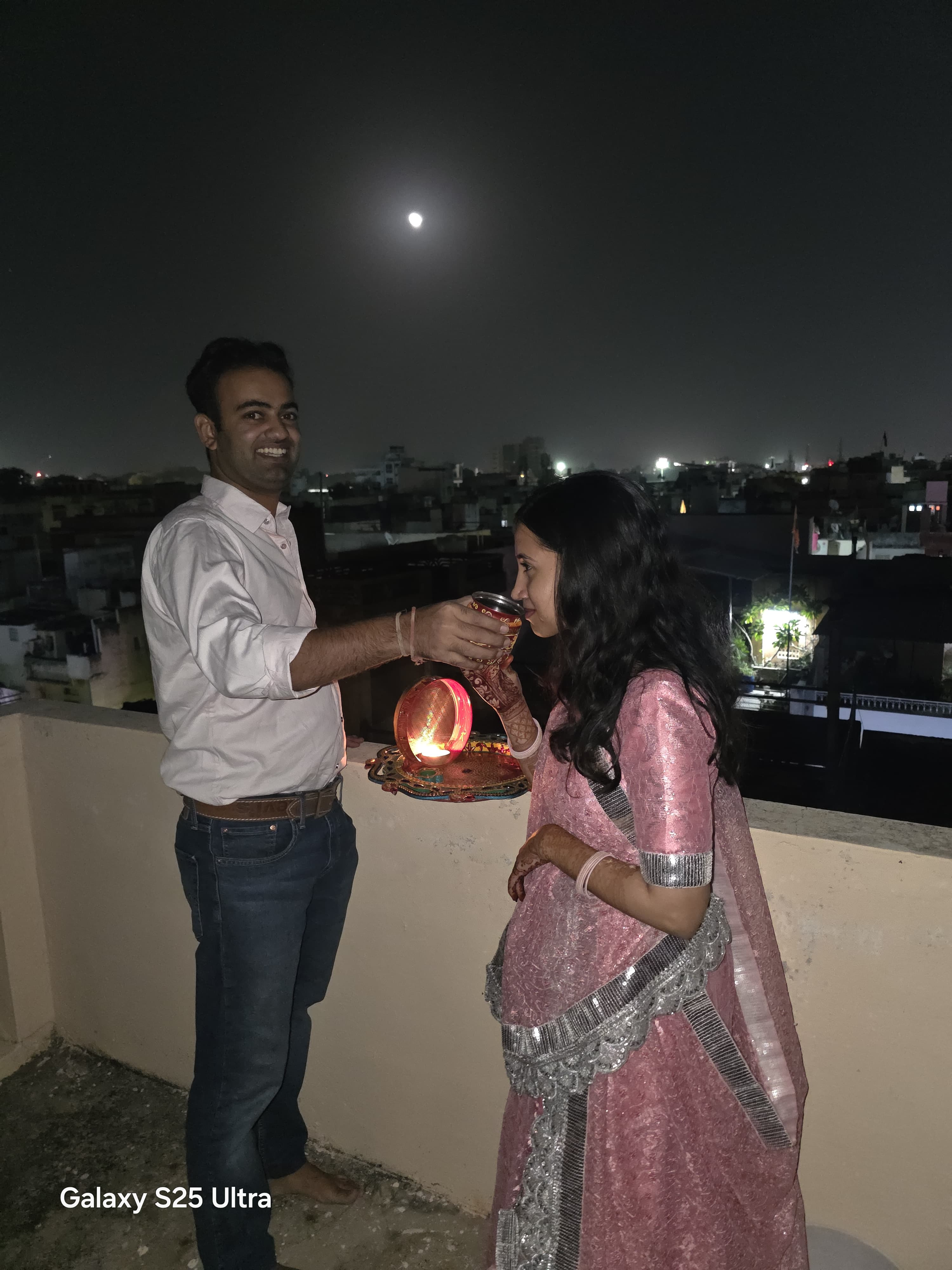
On Karva Chauth, her husband offers her the first sip of water after sighting the moon.

Men are entirely excluded from the festival's observances until moonrise, though they are expected to demonstrate attention and concern for their fasting wives during the day.

The fera ceremony concluded, the women await the rising of the moon. Once the moon is visible, the wife views the moon or its reflection in a vessel filled with water, through a sieve, or through the cloth of a dupatta. In the rim of the sieve, a small diya (earthen lamp) is lit and placed. Then, the woman looks at her husband's face through the sieve. Water is offered (arghya) to the moon (Chandra, the moon god) to secure its blessings. Then the wife tosses the sieve behind her, allowing the lamp to fall behind and break. This signifies removing the evil eye from her husband. In some regions, the woman says a brief prayer with an Aarti asking for her husband's longevity. It is believed that at this stage, spiritually strengthened by her fast, the woman can successfully confront and defeat the fear of death (personified by Yama, the death god). In Rajasthan, the women say "Like the gold necklace and the pearl bracelet, just like the moon, may my suhaag (spouse) always shine brightly."

Her husband then takes the water from the plate and offers it to his wife; taking her first sip of water of the day, the fast is now broken and the wife and husband can have a complete meal together.

== Popular cultural aspects and critiques ==
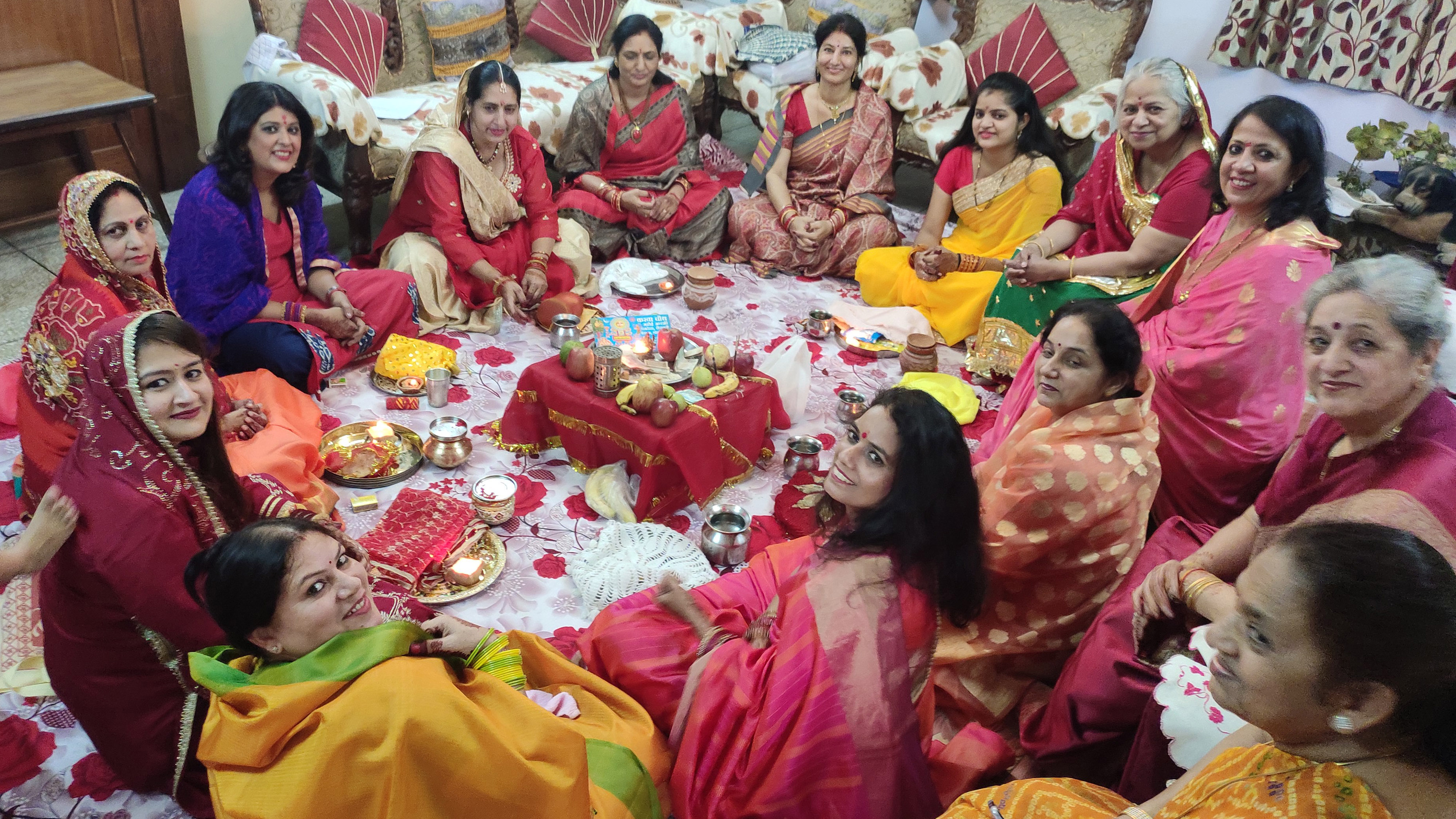
The fasting women collectively sitting in a circle, while doing Karva Chauth puja.

Since Karva Chauth is celebrated primarily by women and because beauty rituals and dressing-up are a significant part of the day, the festival is seen as an event that bonds women together.

In modern North India and Northwestern India, Karva Chauth is considered to be a romantic festival, symbolizing the love between a husband and wife. Similar to Valentine's Day, the lack of a romantic partner can acutely be felt by single women. The festival is used extensively in advertising campaigns in the region, for instance in a Chevrolet TV spot in which a man demonstrates his caring for his wife by buying a car with a sunroof so he can drive her around on Karva Chauth night until she spots the moon through it.

It has been celebrated in Hindi movies such as Dilwale Dulhania Le Jayenge, where an unmarried woman signals her love for a man by keeping the fast for him and he reciprocates by secretly fasting as a gesture of empathy, as well as demonstrating his concern for her during the day and breaking her fast by feeding her at moonrise, and Baghban, in which, over the telephone, a man persuades his fasting elderly wife to break her fast because they have been separated by their uncaring children.

News coverage of celebrities sometimes highlights the keeping of the fast by an unmarried public figure because it indicates a strong and likely permanent romantic attachment.

In the present day, groups of unmarried women sometimes keep the fast out of a sense of friendship, though this practice is far from universal. This is especially true in the urban areas of North India and Northwestern India, where the fasting is interpreted as a prayer for a loving husband in the future.

Another trend in the northern urban areas is the spreading of the festival's observance to few women originating in communities and regions (such as immigrants in Mumbai, Kumaon Garhwal) that have not traditionally celebrated Karva Chauth or even been aware of the festival's existence. The same is true for Gujarat.

In certain regions of Bengal, Northeast India, and Bhutan, notably during the Karva Chauth celebrations, a distinctive tradition is observed where teenage boys actively participate in the festivities and join married women in the fasting rituals. The practice is believed to symbolize a collective aspiration for the boys to find suitable life partners in the future. There is also a spiritual dimension to this tradition, as it is said to be an act of devotion to the goddess Parvati, who is venerated as a symbol of marital harmony and longevity.

== Traditional tales ==
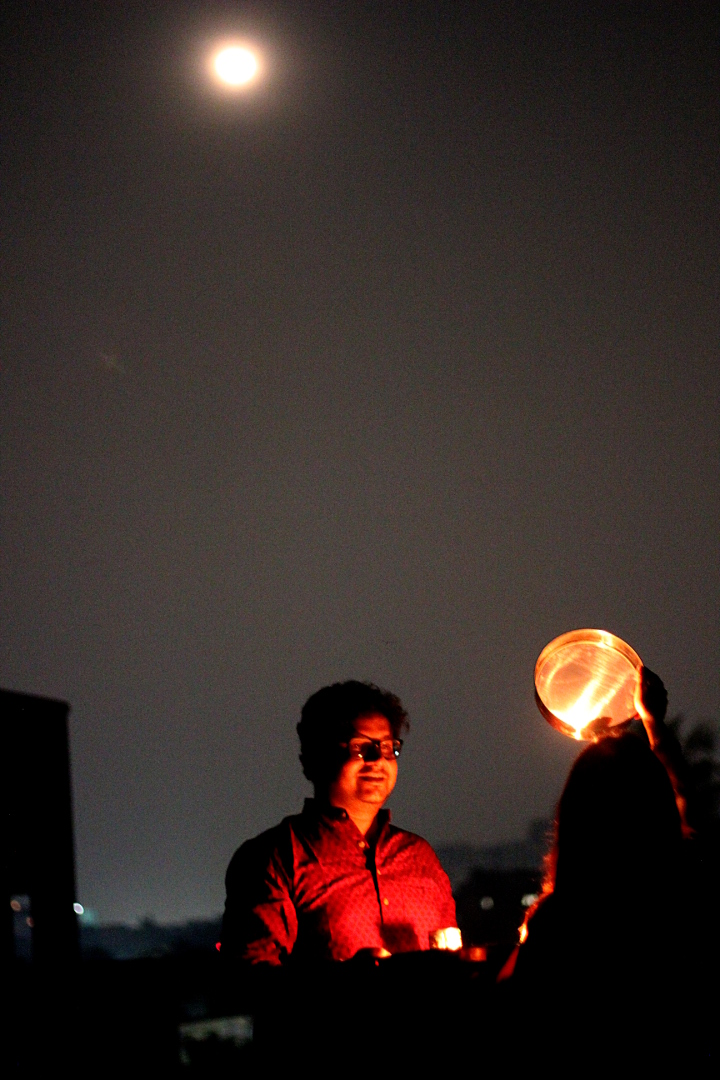

There are legends associated with the Karva Chauth festival. In some tellings, the tales are interlinked, with one acting as a frame story for another.

=== Story of Queen Veeravati ===
A beautiful queen called Veeravati was the only sister of seven loving brothers. She spent her first Karva Chauth as a married woman at her parents' house. She began a strict fast after sunrise but, by evening, was desperately waiting for the moonrise as she suffered severe thirst and hunger. Her seven brothers couldn't bear to see their sister in such distress and fixed a mirror on a pipal tree that made it look as though the moon had risen. Veeravati mistook it for the moon and broke her fast. The moment she took the first morsel of food, she sneezed. In her second morsel she found strands of hair. After the third she learned the news of her husband, the king, was dead. Heartbroken, Veeravati wept through the night until her spiritual strength compelled the goddess Parvati to appear and ask why she was crying. When Veeravati explained her distress, Parvati revealed how she had been tricked by her brothers and instructed her to redo the Karva Chauth fast with complete devotion. When Veeravati repeated the fast, Parvati commanded the death god Yama to resurrect Veeravati's husband back to life.

In a variant of this story, the brothers build a massive fire behind a mountain instead and trick their sister by convincing her that the glow is the moon. She breaks her fast and word arrives that her beloved husband has died. She immediately begins running to her husband's house, which is somewhat distant, and is intercepted by the divine couple Lord Shiva and his wife Parvati. Parvati reveals the trickery to her, cuts her own little finger to give Veeravati a few drops of her holy blood, and instructs her to be careful in keeping the complete fast in the future. The wife sprinkles Parvati's blood on her dead husband. The husband is resurrected alive and he puts a few blood drops on Veeravati's hair parting, adorning it as sindoor.

=== Legend of Mahabharata ===
The belief in this fast and its associated rituals is associated with a legend of the Mahabharata. Draupadi, too, is said to have observed this fast. Once, Arjuna went to the Nilgiris for penance and the rest of the Pandavas faced many problems in his absence. Draupadi, out of desperation, remembered Lord Krishna and asked for help. Krishna reminded her that on an earlier occasion, when Parvati had sought Shiva's guidance under similar circumstances, she had been advised to observe the fast of Karva Chauth. In some tellings of this legend, Shiva tells Parvati the story of Veeravati to describe the Karva Chauth fast. Draupadi followed the instructions and observed the fast with all its rituals. Consequently, the Pandavas were able to overcome their problems.

=== The legend of Karva ===
A woman named Karva was deeply devoted to her husband. Her intense love towards him gave her shakti (spiritual power). While bathing at a river, her husband was caught by a crocodile. Karva bravely bound the crocodile's mouth with cotton yarn and asked Yama (the god of death) to send the crocodile to hell. Yama refused. Karva threatened to harm Yama by cursing him. Yama, afraid of being cursed by a pativrata (devoted wife), immediately sent the crocodile to hell and blessed Karva's husband with a long life. Karva and her husband enjoyed many years together. To this day, Karva Chauth is celebrated with great faith and belief.

== Annual dates ==
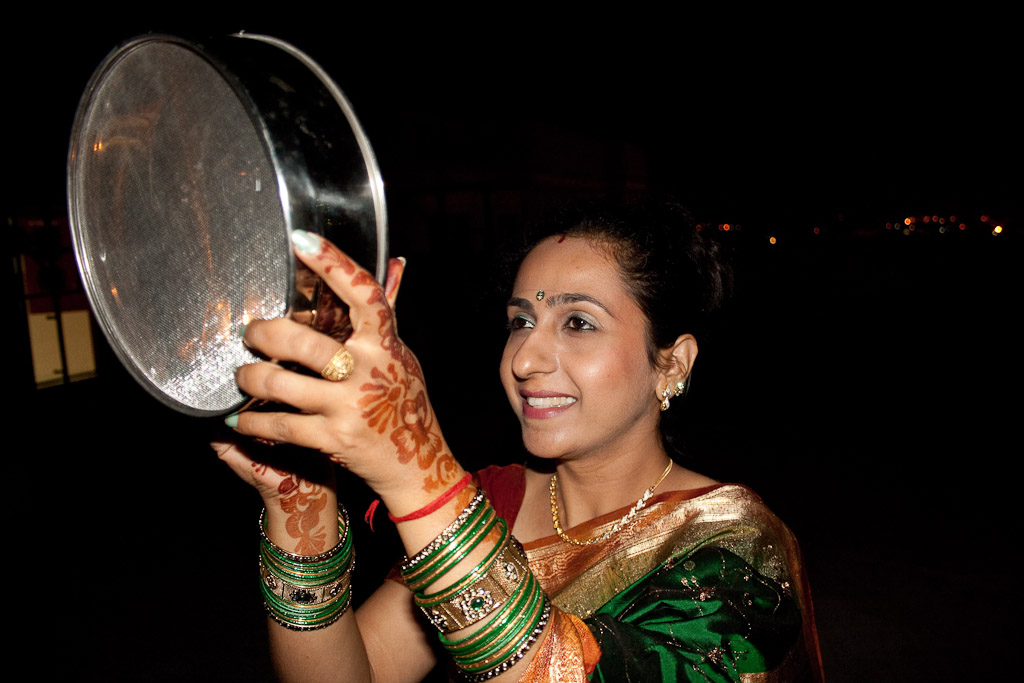
A woman looks at the moon through the sieve

The following dates are based on the Hindu calendar.

2020	4 November
2021	24 October
2022	13 October
2023	1 November
2024	20 October
2025	10 October
2026	29 October

== See also ==
- Savitri Vrata – Hindu festival where wives pray for husbands
- Varalakshmi Vratam – Hindu observance
