= Full moon =

Lunar phase when the Moon is fully illuminated

A full moon was taken on August 3, 2020

As the Earth revolves around the Sun, approximate axial parallelism of the Moon's orbital plane (tilted five degrees to the Earth's orbital plane) results in the revolution of the lunar nodes relative to the Earth. This causes an eclipse season approximately every six months, in which a lunar eclipse can occur at the full moon phase.

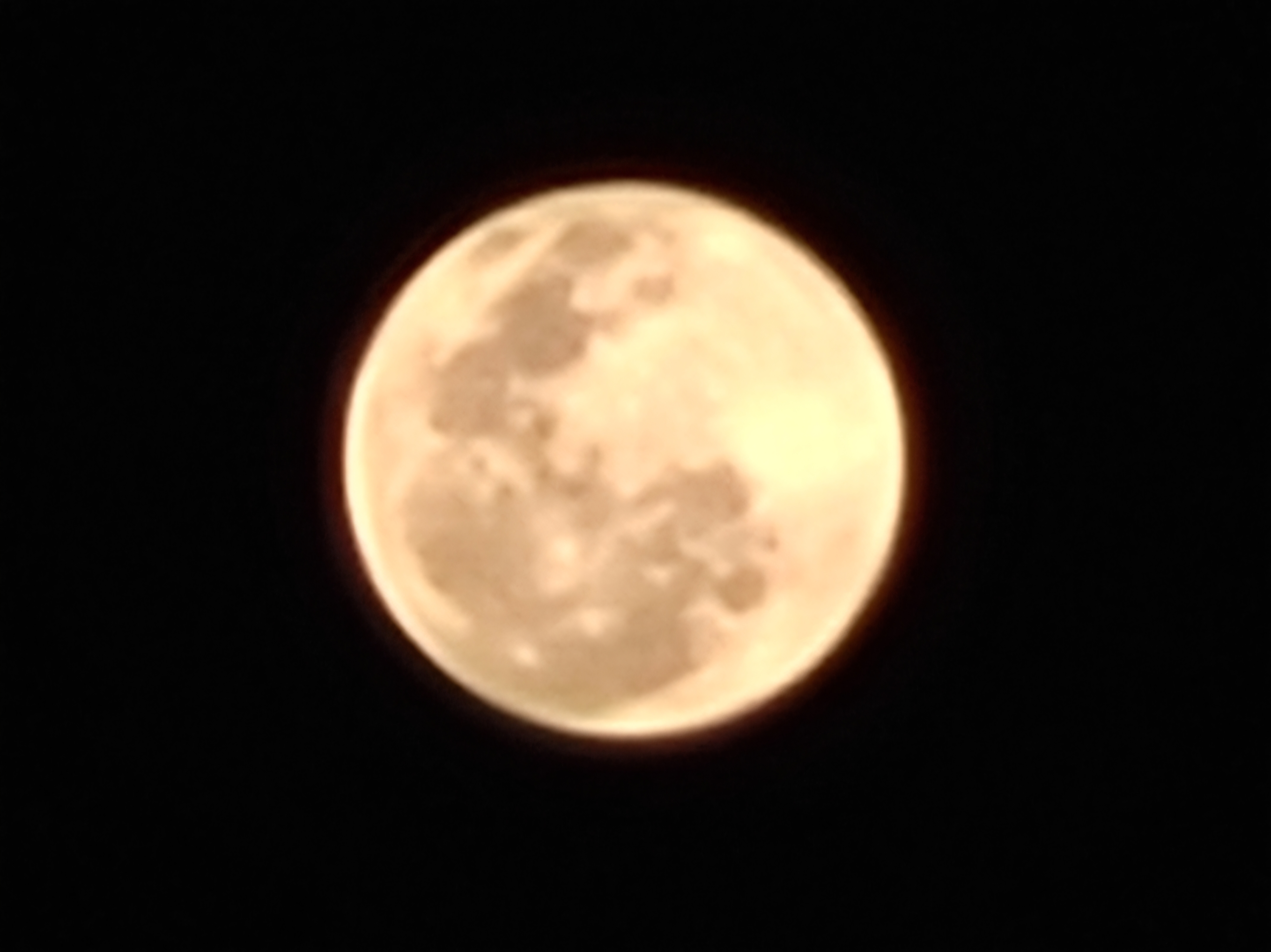
A full moon

The full moon is the lunar phase when the Moon appears fully illuminated from Earth's perspective. This occurs when Earth is located between the Sun and the Moon (when the ecliptic longitudes of the Sun and Moon differ by 180°). This means that the lunar hemisphere facing Earth—the near side—is completely sunlit and appears as an approximately circular disk. The full moon occurs roughly once a month.

The time interval between a full moon and the next repetition of the same phase, a synodic month, averages about 29.53 days. Because of irregularities in the moon's orbit, the new and full moons may fall up to thirteen hours either side of their mean. If the calendar date is not locally determined through observation of the new moon at the beginning of the month there is the potential for a further twelve hours difference depending on the time zone. Potential discrepancies also arise from whether the calendar day is considered to begin in the evening or at midnight. It is normal for the full moon to fall on the fourteenth or the fifteenth of the month according to whether the start of the month is reckoned from the appearance of the new moon or from the conjunction.

Culturally and spiritually significant across many societies, full moons are associated with festivals such as Vesak in Buddhism and various Purnima observances in Hinduism. Many traditions have named specific full moons—like the harvest moon or hunter's moon—and linked them to seasonal or agricultural events. Folklore has associated full moons with insomnia, madness, and supernatural events, though scientific studies have not found consistent evidence of behavioral effects. In modern times, terms like "blood moon" and "blue moon" have entered popular use, often referring to lunar eclipses or rare lunar events.

A tabular lunar calendar will also exhibit variations depending on the intercalation system used. Because a calendar month consists of a whole number of days, a month in a lunar calendar may be either 29 or 30 days long.

== Characteristics ==
A full moon is often thought of as an event of a full night's duration, although its phase seen from Earth continuously waxes or wanes, and is full only at the instant when waxing ends and waning begins. For any given location, about half of these maximum full moons may be visible, while the other half occur during the day, when the full moon is below the horizon. As the Moon's orbit is inclined by 5.145° from the ecliptic, it is not generally perfectly opposite from the Sun during full phase, therefore a full moon is in general not perfectly full except on nights with a lunar eclipse as the Moon crosses the ecliptic at opposition from the Sun.

Many almanacs list full moons not only by date, but also by their exact time, usually in Coordinated Universal Time (UTC). Typical monthly calendars that include lunar phases may be offset by one day when prepared for a different time zone.

The full moon is generally a suboptimal time for astronomical observation of the Moon because shadows vanish. It is a poor time for other observations because the bright sunlight reflected by the Moon, amplified by the opposition surge, then outshines many stars.

=== Moon phases ===
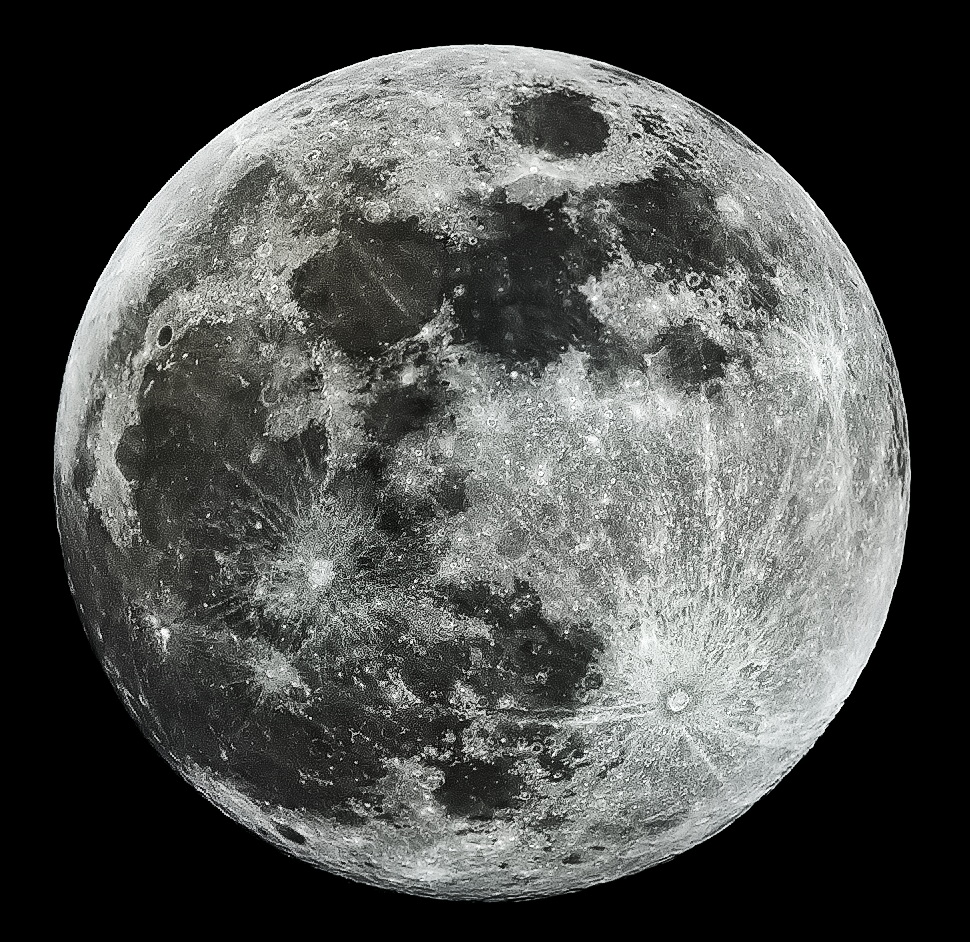
Full moon, 13 March 2025. Taken with a Nikon Z6II camera and Sigma 150-600mm f 5-6.3 DG OS HSM lens

There are eight phases of the moon, which vary from partial to full illumination. The moon phases are also called lunar phases. These stages have different names that come from its shape and size at each phase. For example, the crescent moon is 'banana' shaped, and the half-moon is D-shaped. When the moon is nearly full, it is called a gibbous moon. The crescent and gibbous moons each last approximately a week.

Each phase is also described in accordance to its position on the full 29.5-day cycle. The eight phases of the moon in order:

- new moon
- waxing crescent moon
- first quarter moon
- waxing gibbous moon
- full moon
- waning gibbous moon
- last quarter moon
- waning crescent moon

=== Formula ===
The date and approximate time of a specific full moon (assuming a circular orbit) can be calculated from the following equation:

$$d = 20.362000+ 29.530588861 \times N + 102.026 \times 10^{-12} \times N^2$$

where d is the number of days since 1 January 2000 00:00:00 in the Terrestrial Time scale used in astronomical ephemerides; for Universal Time (UT) add the following approximate correction to d:

$-0.000739 - (235 \times 10^{-12})\times N^2$ days

where N is the number of full moons since the first full moon of 2000. The true time of a full moon may differ from this approximation by up to about 14.5 hours as a result of the non-circularity of the Moon's orbit. See New moon for an explanation of the formula and its parameters.

The age and apparent size of the full moon vary in a cycle of just under 14 synodic months, which has been referred to as a full moon cycle.

=== Lunar eclipses ===
When the Moon moves into Earth's shadow, a lunar eclipse occurs, during which all or part of the Moon's face may appear reddish due to the Rayleigh scattering of blue wavelengths and the refraction of sunlight through Earth's atmosphere. Lunar eclipses happen only during a full moon and around points on its orbit where the satellite may pass through the planet's shadow. A lunar eclipse does not occur every month because the Moon's orbit is inclined 5.145° with respect to the ecliptic plane of Earth; thus, the Moon usually passes north or south of Earth's shadow, which is mostly restricted to this plane of reference. Lunar eclipses happen only when the full moon occurs around either node of its orbit (ascending or descending). Therefore, a lunar eclipse occurs about every six months, and often two weeks before or after a solar eclipse, which occurs during a new moon around the opposite node.

== In folklore and tradition ==
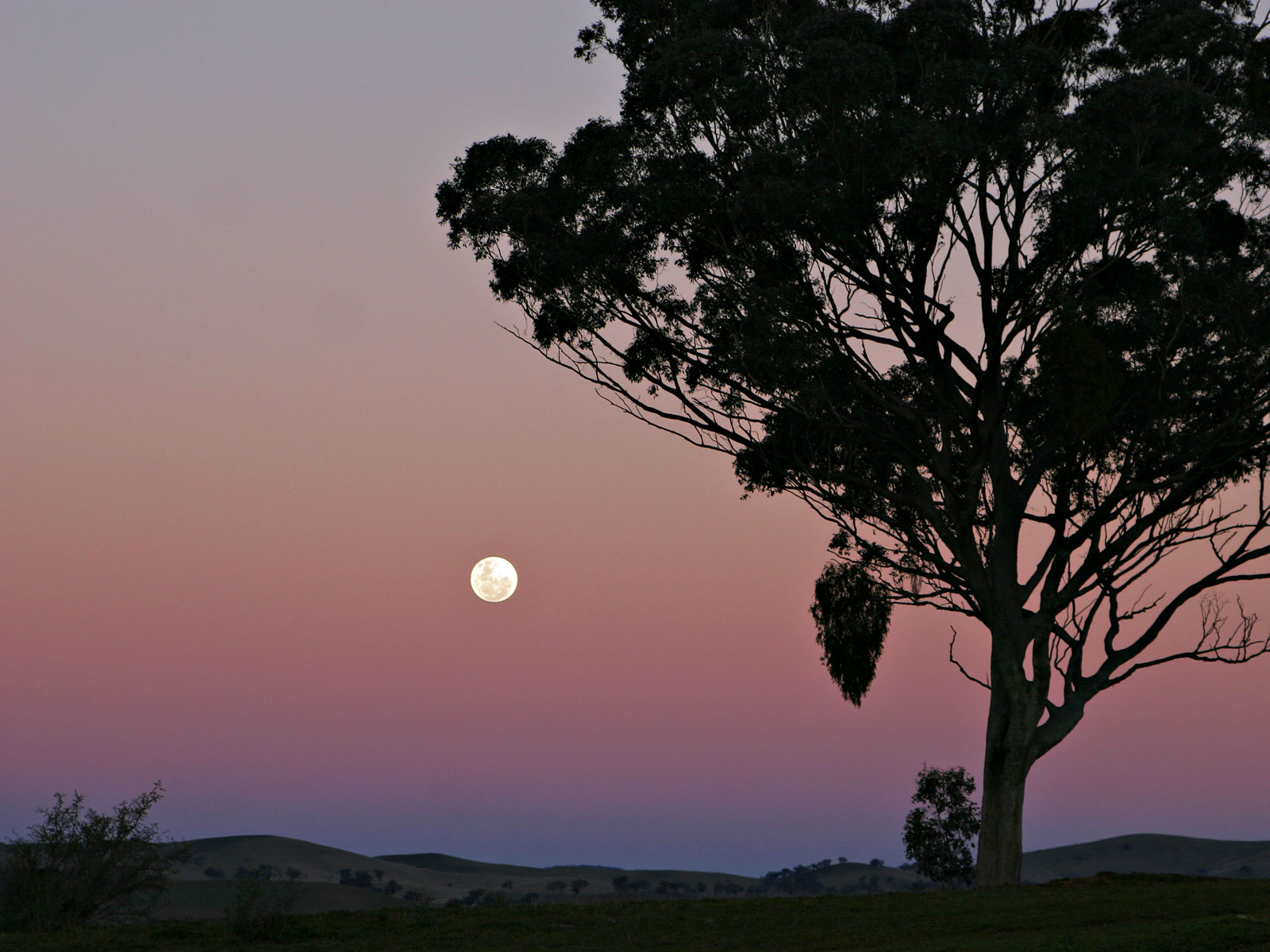
A full moon rising, seen through the Belt of Venus

In Buddhism, Vesak is celebrated on the full moon day of the Vaisakha month, marking the birth, enlightenment, and the death of the Buddha.

In Arabic, badr (بدر ) means 'full moon', but it is often translated as 'white moon', referring to The White Days, the three days when the full moon is celebrated.

Full moons are traditionally associated with insomnia (inability to sleep), insanity (hence the terms lunacy and lunatic) and various "magical phenomena" such as lycanthropy. Psychologists, however, have found that there is no strong evidence for effects on human behavior around the time of a full moon. They find that studies are generally not consistent, with some showing a positive effect and others showing a negative effect. In one instance, the 23 December 2000 issue of the British Medical Journal published two studies on dog bite admission to hospitals in England and Australia. The study of the Bradford Royal Infirmary found that dog bites were twice as common during a full moon, whereas the study conducted by the public hospitals in Australia found that they were less likely.

Symbol of the Triple Goddess

The symbol of the Triple Goddess is drawn with the circular image of the full moon in the center flanked by a left facing crescent and right facing crescent, on either side, representing a maiden, mother and crone archetype.

=== Full moon names ===
Historically, month names are names of moons (lunations, not necessarily full moons) in lunisolar calendars. Since the introduction of the solar Julian calendar in the Roman Empire, and later the Gregorian calendar worldwide, people no longer perceive month names as "moon" names. The traditional Old English month names were equated with the names of the Julian calendar from an early time, soon after the Christianisation of Anglo-Saxon England. This can be seen in the testimony of Bede from The Reckoning of Time (CE 725), where lunar month names are equated with the approximate Roman equivalents.

Some full moons have developed new names in modern times, such as "blue moon", as well as "harvest moon" and "hunter's moon" for the full moons of autumn.

The golden or reddish hue of the Harvest Moon and other full moons near the horizon is caused by atmospheric scattering. When the Moon is low in the sky, its light passes through a thicker layer of Earth's atmosphere, scattering shorter wavelengths like blue and violet and allowing longer wavelengths, such as red and yellow, to dominate. This effect, combined with environmental factors such as dust, pollutants, or haze, can intensify or dull the Moon's color. Clear skies often enhance the yellow or golden appearance, particularly during the autumn months when these full moons are observed.

Lunar eclipses occur only at a full moon and often cause a reddish hue on the near side of the Moon. This full moon has been called a blood moon in popular culture.

==== Harvest and hunter's moons ====
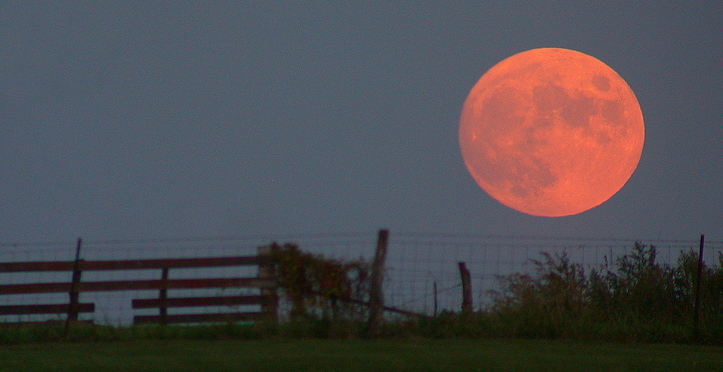
A harvest moon. Its orange color is due to greater Rayleigh scattering as the Moon appears close above the horizon, rather than being unique to harvest moons.

The "harvest moon" and the "hunter's moon" are traditional names for the full moons in late summer and in the autumn in the Northern Hemisphere, usually in September and October, respectively. People may celebrate these occurrences in festivities such as the Chinese Mid-Autumn Festival.

The "harvest moon" (also known as the "barley moon" or "full corn moon") is the full moon nearest to the autumnal equinox (22 or 23 September), occurring anytime within two weeks before or after that date. The "hunter's moon" is the full moon following it. The names are recorded from the early 18th century. The Oxford English Dictionary entry for "harvest moon" cites a 1706 reference, and for "hunter's moon" a 1710 edition of The British Apollo, which attributes the term to "the country people" ("The Country People call this the Hunters-Moon.") The names became traditional in American folklore, where they are now often popularly attributed to Native Americans. The Feast of the Hunters' Moon is a yearly festival in West Lafayette, Indiana, held in late September or early October each year since 1968. In 2010 the harvest moon occurred on the night of the equinox itself (some 5 1/2 hours after the moment of equinox) for the first time since 1991, after a period known as the Metonic cycle.

All full moons rise around the time of sunset. Since the Moon moves eastward among the stars faster than the Sun, lunar culmination is delayed by about 50.47 minutes (on average) each day, thus causing moonrise to occur later each day. However, in mid-northern latitudes the moon's orbital path (tilted 5.1° from the ecliptic) lies nearly parallel to the horizon around the time of the autumnal equinox, so that the moon's daily orbital motion has a relatively small effect on the time of moonrise. So, for about a week centered on the equinox the mostly full moon rises close to the time of sunset, providing illumination throughout the night, aiding agricultural workers in completing the harvest prior to the invention of artificial lighting.

Due to the high lunar standstill, the harvest and hunter's moons of 2007 were special because the time difference between moonrises on successive evenings was much shorter than average. The moon rose about 30 minutes later from one night to the next, as seen from about 40° N or S latitude (because the full moon of September 2007 rose in the northeast rather than in the east). Hence, no long period of darkness occurred between sunset and moonrise for several days after the full moon, thus lengthening the time in the evening when there is enough twilight and moonlight to work to get the harvest in.

==== Native American ====
Various 18th and 19th century writers gave what were claimed to be Native American or First Nations moon names. These were not the names of the full moons as such, but were the names of lunar months beginning with each new moon. According to Jonathan Carver in 1778, "Some nations among them reckon their years by moons, and make them consist of twelve synodical or lunar months, observing, when thirty moons have waned, to add a supernumerary one, which they term the lost moon; and then begin to count as before." Carver gave the names of the lunar months (starting from the first after the March equinox) as Worm, Plants, Flowers, Hot, Buck, Sturgeon, Corn, Travelling, Beaver, Hunting, Cold, Snow. Carver's account was reproduced verbatim in Events in Indian History (1841), but completely different lists were given by Eugene Vetromile (1856) and Peter Jones (1861).

In a book on Native American culture published in 1882, Richard Irving Dodge stated:

There is a difference among authorities as to whether or not the moons themselves are named. Brown gives names for nine moons corresponding to months. Maximillian gives the names of twelve moons; and Belden, who lived many years among the Sioux, asserts that "the Indians compute their time very much as white men do, only they use moons instead of months to designate the seasons, each answering to some month in our calendar." Then follows a list of twelve moons with Indian and English names. While I cannot contradict so positive and minute a statement of one so thoroughly in a position to know, I must assert with equal positiveness that I have never met any wild Indians, of the Sioux or other Plains tribes, who had a permanent, common, conventional name for any moon. The looseness of Belden's general statement, that "Indians compute time like white people," when his only particularization of similarity is between the months and moons, is in itself sufficient to render the whole statement questionable. My experience is that the Indian, in attempting to fix on a particular moon, will designate it by some natural and well-known phenomenon which culminates during that moon. But two Indians of the same tribe may fix on different designations; and even the same Indian, on different occasions, may give different names to the same moon. Thus, an Indian of the middle Plains will to-day designate a spring moon as "the moon when corn is planted;" to-morrow, speaking of the same moon, he may call it "the moon when the buffalo comes." Moreover, though there are thirteen moons in our year, no observer has ever given an Indian name to the thirteenth. My opinion is, that if any of the wild tribes have given conventional names to twelve moons, it is not an indigenous idea, but borrowed from the whites.

Jonathan Carver's list of purportedly Native American month names was adopted in the 19th century by the Improved Order of Red Men, an all-white U.S. fraternal organization. They called the month of January "Cold moon", the rest being Snow, Worm, Plant, Flower, Hot, Buck, Sturgeon, Corn, Travelling, Beaver and Hunting moon. They numbered years from the time of Columbus's arrival in America.

In The American Boy's Book of Signs, Signals and Symbols (1918), Daniel Carter Beard wrote: "The Indians' Moons naturally vary in the different parts of the country, but by comparing them all and striking an average as near as may be, the moons are reduced to the following." He then gave a list that had two names for each lunar month, again quite different from earlier lists that had been published.

The 1937 Maine Farmers' Almanac published a list of full moon names that it said "were named by our early English ancestors as follows":

Winter Moons: Moon after Yule, Wolf Moon, Lenten Moon
Spring Moons: Egg Moon, Milk Moon, Flower Moon
Summer Moons: Hay Moon, Grain Moon, Fruit Moon
Fall Moons: Harvest Moon, Hunter's Moon, Moon before Yule

It also mentioned blue moon. These were considered in some quarters to be Native American full moon names, and some were adopted by colonial Americans. The Farmers' Almanac (since 1955 published in Maine, but not the same publication as the Maine Farmers' Almanac) continues to print such names.

Such names have gained currency in American folklore. They appeared in print more widely outside of the almanac tradition from the 1990s in popular publications about the Moon. Mysteries of the Moon by Patricia Haddock ("Great Mysteries Series", Greenhaven Press, 1992) gave an extensive list of such names along with the individual tribal groups they were supposedly associated with. Haddock supposes that certain "Colonial American" moon names were adopted from Algonquian languages (which were formerly spoken in the territory of New England), while others are based in European tradition (e.g. the Colonial American names for the May moon, "Milk Moon", "Mother's Moon", "Hare Moon" have no parallels in the supposed native names, while the name of November, "Beaver Moon" is supposedly based in an Algonquian language). Many other names have been reported.

These have passed into modern mythology, either as full-moon names, or as names for lunar months. Deanna J. Conway's Moon Magick: Myth & Magick, Crafts & Recipes, Rituals & Spells (1995) gave as headline names for the lunar months (from January): Wolf, Ice, Storm, Growing, Hare, Mead, Hay, Corn, Harvest, Blood, Snow, Cold. Conway also gave multiple alternative names for each month, e.g. the first lunar month after the winter solstice could be called the Wolf, Quiet, Snow, Cold, Chaste or Disting Moon, or the Moon of Little Winter. For the last lunar month Conway offered the names Cold, Oak or Wolf Moon, or Moon of Long Nights, Long Night's Moon, Aerra Geola (Month Before Yule), Wintermonat (Winter Month), Heilagmanoth (Holy Month), Big Winter Moon, Moon of Popping Trees. Conway did not cite specific sources for most of the names she listed, but some have gained wider currency as full-moon names, such as Pink Moon for a full moon in April, Long Night's Moon for the last in December and Ice Moon for the first full moon of January or February.

=== Hindu full moon festivals ===
In Hinduism, most festivals are celebrated on auspicious days. Many Hindu festivals are celebrated on days with a full moon night, called the purnima. Different parts of India celebrate the same festival with different names, as listed below:

1. Chaitra Purnima – Gudi Padua, Ugadi, Hanuman Jayanti (15 April 2014)
2. Vaishakha Purnima – Narasimha Jayanti, Buddha Jayanti (14 May 2014)
3. Jyeshtha Purnima – Savitri Vrata, Vat Purnima (8 June 2014)
4. Ashadha Purnima – Guru Purnima, Vyasa Purnima
5. Shravana Purnima – Upanayana ceremony, Avani Avittam, Raksha Bandhan, Onam
6. Bhadrapada Purnima – Start of Pitru Paksha, Madhu Purnima
7. Ashvin Purnima – Sharad Purnima
8. Kartika Purnima – Karthikai Deepam, Thrukkarthika
9. Margashirsha Purnima – Thiruvathira, Dattatreya Jayanti
10. Pushya Purnima – Thaipusam, Shakambhari Purnima
11. Magha Purnima
12. Phalguna Purnima – Holi

== Lunar and lunisolar calendars ==
The December 2015 full moon coincided with Christmas. This last occurred in 1977 (for the American time zones). A small horizontal libration is visible comparing their appearances. By the 19-year metonic cycle the full moon will repeat on Christmas Day in 2034, 2053, 2072, and 2091.

Most pre-modern calendars the world over were lunisolar, combining the solar year with the lunation by means of intercalary months. The Julian calendar abandoned this method in favour of a purely solar reckoning while conversely the 7th-century Islamic calendar opted for a purely lunar one.

A continuing lunisolar calendar is the Hebrew calendar. Evidence of this is noted in the dates of Passover and Easter in Judaism and Christianity, respectively. Passover falls on the full moon on 15 Nisan of the Hebrew calendar. The date of the Jewish Rosh Hashana and Sukkot festivals along with all other Jewish holidays are dependent on the dates of the new moons. Another continuing lunisolar calendar is the Chinese calendar, which places many of its most important festivals, such as Chinese New Year, the Dragon Boat Festival, and the Mid-Autumn Festival, according to lunisolar dates.

=== Intercalary months ===
In lunisolar calendars, an intercalary month occurs seven times in the 19 years of the Metonic cycle, or on average every 2.7 years (19/7). In the Hebrew calendar this is noted with a periodic extra month of Adar in the early spring. The Chinese calendar, by contrast, can place its intercalary month anywhere in the year, and does so based on finding the first month within a thirteen-month winter-solstice-to-winter-solstice period to include no major solar term.

== Meetings arranged to coincide with full moon ==
Before the days of good street lighting and car headlights, several organisations arranged their meetings for full moon, so that it would be easier for their members to walk, or ride home. Examples include the Lunar Society of Birmingham, several Masonic societies, including Warren Lodge No. 32, USA and Masonic Hall, York, Western Australia, and several New Zealand local authorities, including Awakino, Ohura and Whangarei County Councils and Maori Hill and Wanganui East Borough Councils.

== Full moon in movies ==
The rising of the full moon is seen in Koyaanisqatsi. During this sequence, spectators could recognize many surface details which are observable through telescopes. While the full moon's disc is rising, the music from Philip Glass creates a philosophical mood.

== See also ==
- Blue moon
- Lunar eclipse
- Lunar effect
- Lunar phase
- Near side of the Moon
- Orbit of the Moon
