= Varalakshmi =

Varalakshmi or Varalaxmi might refer to:

- Varalakshmi, another name for the goddess Lakshmi, especially on the day of Varalakshmi Vratam
- G. Varalakshmi, Indian actress
- P. R. Varalakshmi, Indian actress
- S. Varalakshmi, Indian actress and singer
- Varalaxmi Sarathkumar (born 1985), Indian actress
