= Atla Tadde =

Andhra Pradesh traditional festival

- Observed by: Telugu Married Hindu women
- Type: Spring festival of Goddess Gauri
- Begins: Aswiyuja
- Date: 3rd night after the full moon in Aswiyuja month of Telugu calendar
- Frequency: annual

Atla Tadde is a festival celebrated by Hindu women, mainly in the Indian states of Andhra Pradesh and Telangana. Unmarried women pray for a good husband, while married women pray for their husbands' health and long life. It occurs on the third night after the full moon in the month of Aswiyuja in the Telugu calendar, which falls in either September or October in the Gregorian calendar. It is the Telugu equivalent of Karva Chauth, which is celebrated by North Indian women the following day.

== Ritual ==
Telugu Hindu women commemorate Atla Tadde by fasting for a day. They perform a pūja in the evening, and break their fast by eating small aṭlu after gazing at the moon.

Following are common customs:

- This festival is celebrated by women and children.
- On the eve of this day, they apply Gorintaku (henna) on their palms.
- Women and children wake up before sunrise and have suddi (rice cooked day before night) with perugu (curd) and Gongura chutney.
- Unmarried girls and children play on the streets singing Atla Tadde Songs.
- People bathe in the river, swing in the Uyyala (Swing (seat)). They play and enjoy the day.
- People watch the reflection of the Moon in a pond or lake welcoming the day.

Other dishes prepared for this festival include:

- Pootarekulu (sweet made with rice flour, jaggery, and milk)
- Kudumulu - 5 for gauri devi and 5 for women and muttayuduvu. One is placed on top of the other 4 to make a deepam for after pooja when the deepam is still lit
- 11 small Dosas for each woman
- Toranam (with 11 knots for Atla Tadde and 5 knots toranam for Undralla Tadde)
- Temanam (made with milk and rice powder)

On this day, some have a custom of preparing atlu and keep those as offering to the goddess Gowri. After the festival they are distributed to relatives and neighbors as vaayanam. For each muttayduvu (these women fast along with the one is performing the pooja). The ceremony includes 11 ladies who already took this vayanam and if your menatta (aunt) took this vayanam, the rituals continues. Each of these 11 women receive 11 atlu with deepam (made of rice flour and ghee and lit in front of goddess Gowri). Each lady is offered the vayanam which is holded with the sarees palluor kongu, while saying

...istinamma vanayam (i gave her the vayanam) ...puchukunna amma vayanam (lady says: i took the vayanam) ...mummatiki ichindamma vayanam (or) andinchinamma vayanam (i gave her the vayanam) ...mummatiki muttindamma vayanam (or) andindamma vayanam (lady says: i received the vayanam) ...vayanam puchukunna vanita evaro (you ask/pose a question saying who took the vayanam) ...ne ne namma gowri parvati (lady says: she says its me GowriParvathi)

After the pooja the fast is broken and take home those atlu and eat later with family members.

== Pooja ceremony ==
- Prepare kalasham on rice, coins (inside kalasam water, kumkum, turmeric, coin, and flower with 5 mango leaves or just water)
- Make pasupu ganapathi
- Gauri ashtotram
- Lalitha harathi/gauri harathi
- State the pooja

People sing folk songs such as Atla Taddi Aaratloi and Mudda Pappu Mudatloi.
