= Savitri Vrata =

Hindu festival where wives pray for husbands

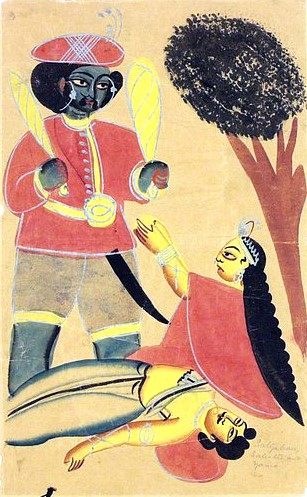
- Savitri begs Yama for Satyavan's life.
- Also called: Savitri Vrata, Sabitri Brata
- Observed by: Married Hindu women of Bihar, Nepal, Odisha and Uttar Pradesh
- Date: Jyeshtha Amavasya
- Related to: Savitri and Satyavan

Savitri Vrata (also Savitri Brata) or Savitri Amavasya is a fasting day, commemorating the pious act of Savitri who rescued her husband, Satyavan, from the god of death (Yama). It occurs on the new moon day in month of Jyeshtha. Married Hindu women observe a fast to promote a long, healthy life for their husbands. It is celebrated in the Indian states of Odisha, Bihar, Uttar Pradesh and in Nepal.

The same festival is observed on Vat Purnima, the full moon of Jyestha in other regions including Maharashtra, Goa, Gujarat, Karnataka.

== Legend behind the festival ==
The story of Savitri is noted in the Hindu epic Mahabharata. The vrata was named after Savitri, the beautiful daughter of King Ashvapati. She selected Satyavan as her life partner, a prince in exile who lived in the forest with his blind father Dyumatsena. Before marrying him, she was foretold that Satyavan would only live for a year - although, this did not stop her decision. After a year, Satyavan, accompanied by Savitri, went to the forest to chop wood, but fell unconscious and died. Yama, the god of death, appeared to take away Satyavan's soul. Seeing this, Savitri followed them, believing it to be her duty as a wife. Yama, moved by the devotion of Savitri, returned the life of her husband. Soon Satyavan regained his lost kingdom, and his father, Dyumatsena, regained his sight.

Savitri's virtue of faithfulness and devotion towards her husband has made her an exemplary figure for Hindu women.

== Customs and rituals ==
The rituals related to Savitri Vrata are collectively compiled under Vat-Savitri puja which is mainly derived from the Sanskrit text the Skanda Purana. Rituals are also noted in later literary works (such as the Chaturvarga Chintmani and Vratarka) inspired by and extracted from the Skanda Purana.

During Savitri Vrata, reverence is offered to Savitri and a banyan tree - by watering and wounding a thread around it. Aside from its medicinal qualities and national symbolism, the banyan tree is offered homage because it is believed that Savitri attained spiritual prowess through its shade during her encounter with Yama.

In Odisha, women offer worship to a grinding stone or sila pua which is considered to be a symbolic representation of Savitri.

== See also ==
- Karva Chauth
- Varalakshmi Vratam
