= Savitri and Satyavan =

Episode in the Mahabharata

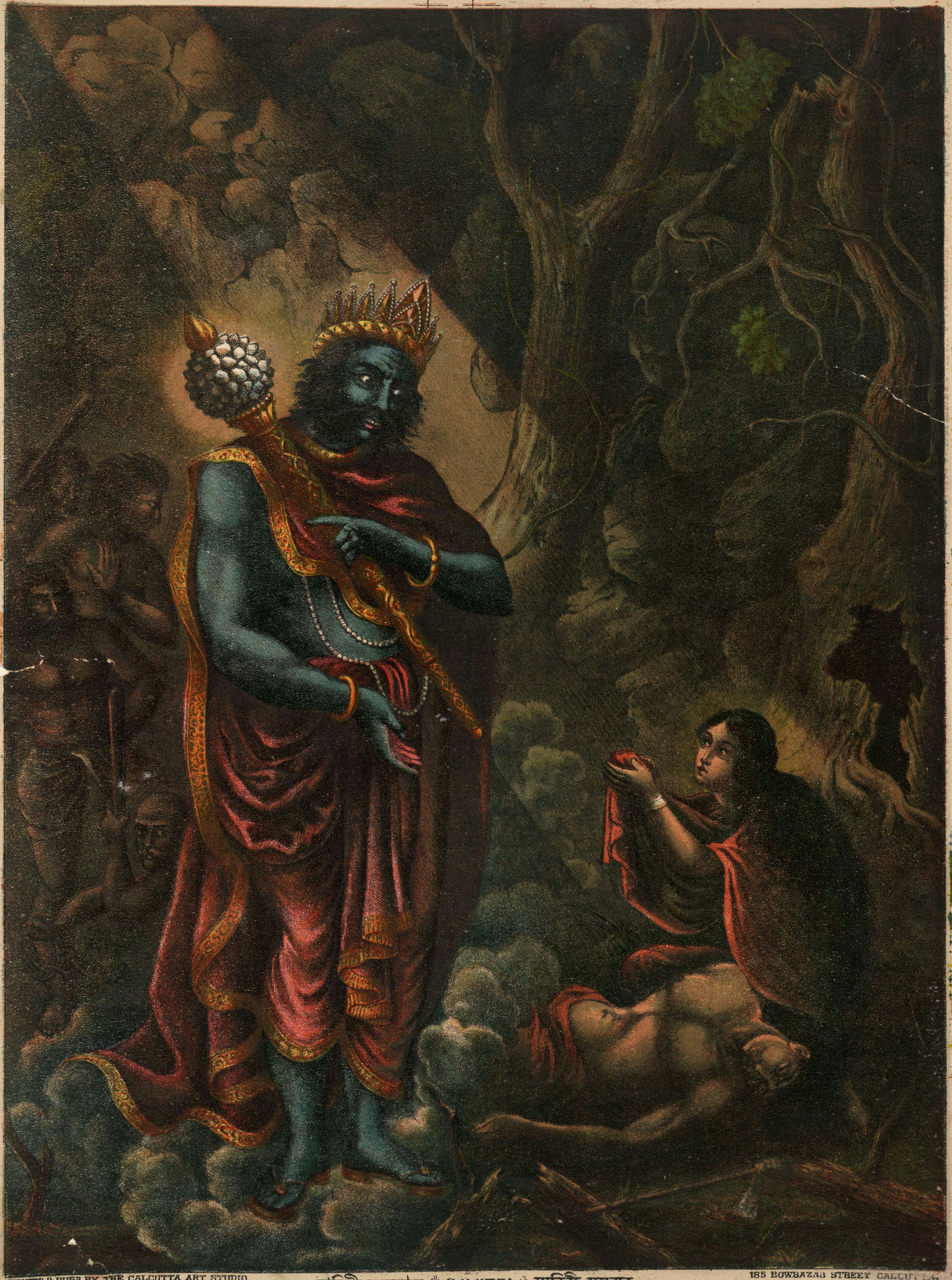
Savitri saving Satyavan's soul from the god of death Yama, 20th-century lithograph

Savitri and Satyavan, also called Sāvitrī-Upākhyāna and Pativrata-mahatmya Parva, is an episode from the Indian epic Mahabharata, appearing in the Vana Parva (The Book of the Forest). It tells the story of Princess Savitri, who, through her intelligence and devotion, overcomes a divine prophecy foretelling her husband Satyavan's early death. This episode is a significant literary and religious text in Hindu tradition, emphasizing themes of the power of speech, the tensions between dharma and moksha, and Vedic symbolism associated with the goddess Savitri and the Gayatri Mantra. Scholars dispute whether the story emphasizes marital fidelity or personal autonomy. Scholars have additionally compared it to several stories from other cultures, such as of Alcestis, Orpheus and Eurydice, and Laodamia and Protesilaus.

This story has been adapted many times. The most famous is an English-language epic poem by Sri Aurobindo, Savitri: A Legend and a Symbol, which uses the story to expound on his philosophy of Integral Yoga. Other notable works include an opera by Gustav Holst, several adaptations in works of literature, and dozens of films. Additionally, Hindus commemorate the story of Savitri through the festivals of Savitri Vrata and Karadaiyan Nonbu.

== Content ==
=== Background ===
The Mahabharata, a vast work of over 100,000 double verses, contains numerous side episodes, some of which are nested within one another, in addition to the main story, which narrates the battle between the Pandavas and Kauravas, two related princely families. The episode of Savitri and Satyavan, known in Sanskrit as Savitri Upakhyana or Pativrata Mahatmya Parva, appears as an embedded narrative within the Vana Parva, the third of the epic's eighteen books. Savitri Upakhyana, which spans sections 277 to 283 of Vana Parva, follows Ramopakhyana (episode of Rama).

In the main narrative, Yudhishthira, the eldest of the five Pandava brothers, loses his kingdom to the Kauravas in a rigged game of dice and is forced into exile in the forest for twelve years along with his four brothers and Draupadi, the common wife of the five Pandava brothers. During their exile, Draupadi is abducted by Jayadratha, a Kaurava ally, but remains steadfast in her devotion to her five husbands, even when offered queenship. Following this event, Yudhishthira asks the sage Markandeya whether any woman has ever displayed devotion equal to Draupadi’s. In response, Markandeya narrates the tale of Savitri and concludes that Draupadi, like Savitri, will bring fortune to the Pandavas.

=== Summary ===
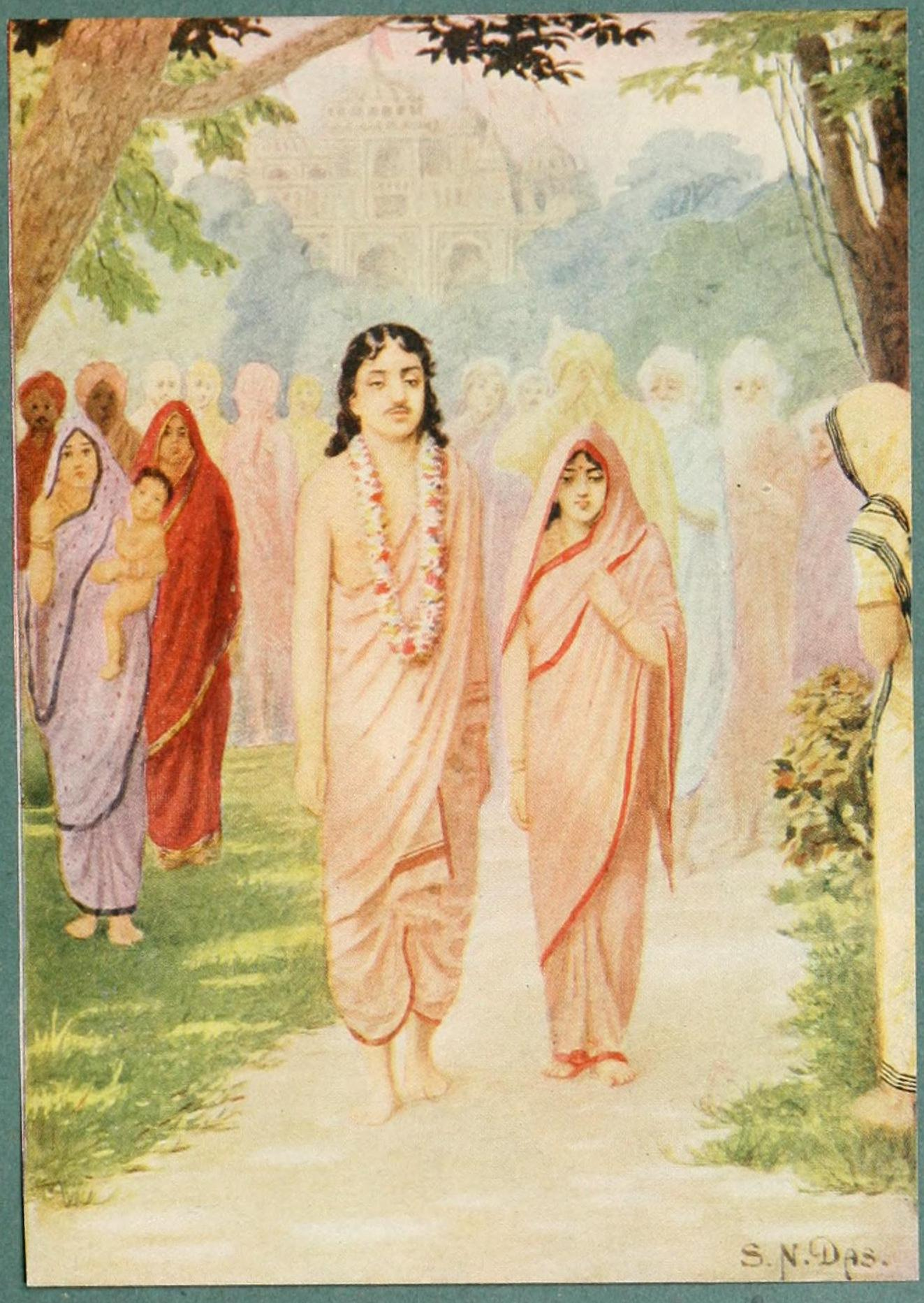
Savitri and Satyavan retreating to forests after their marriage, c. 1919 illustration.

The childless king of the Madra Kingdom, Ashvapati, engaged in penance for eighteen years and offered a hundred thousand oblations to propitiate Savitri, a consort of Brahma. Pleased, the goddess Savitri appeared to him and asked him to choose a boon. Ashvapati sought the boon of having many sons to extend his dynastic line. The goddess, however, informed him that he would be blessed with a daughter instead. After some time, the king's first queen, Malati, became pregnant, and gave birth to a girl. She was named Savitri by her father, in honour of the goddess.

Savitri grew to become a beautiful woman, brimming with such energy that she was often regarded to be a celestial maiden. No man dared to ask for her hand in marriage. On an auspicious day, after she had offered her respects, her father told her to choose a husband with suitable qualities on her own. Accompanied by ministers, she embarked on a quest on her golden chariot, visiting a number of hermitages and forests. Upon her return to Madra, Savitri found her father seated with the sage Narada. She informed her father that she had chosen an exiled prince named Satyavan as her husband, the son of a blind king named Dyumatsena of the Shalva kingdom; Dyumatsena had been driven out of his kingdom by a foe and led a life of exile as a forest-dweller with his wife Shaivya and son. Narada opined that Savitri had made a bad choice: although he was intelligent, righteous, generous, and handsome, Satyavan was destined to die one year from that day. In response to her father's pleas to choose a different husband, Savitri insisted that she had made up her mind. After Narada expressed his agreement with Savitri's decision, Ashvapati consented to his daughter's choice.

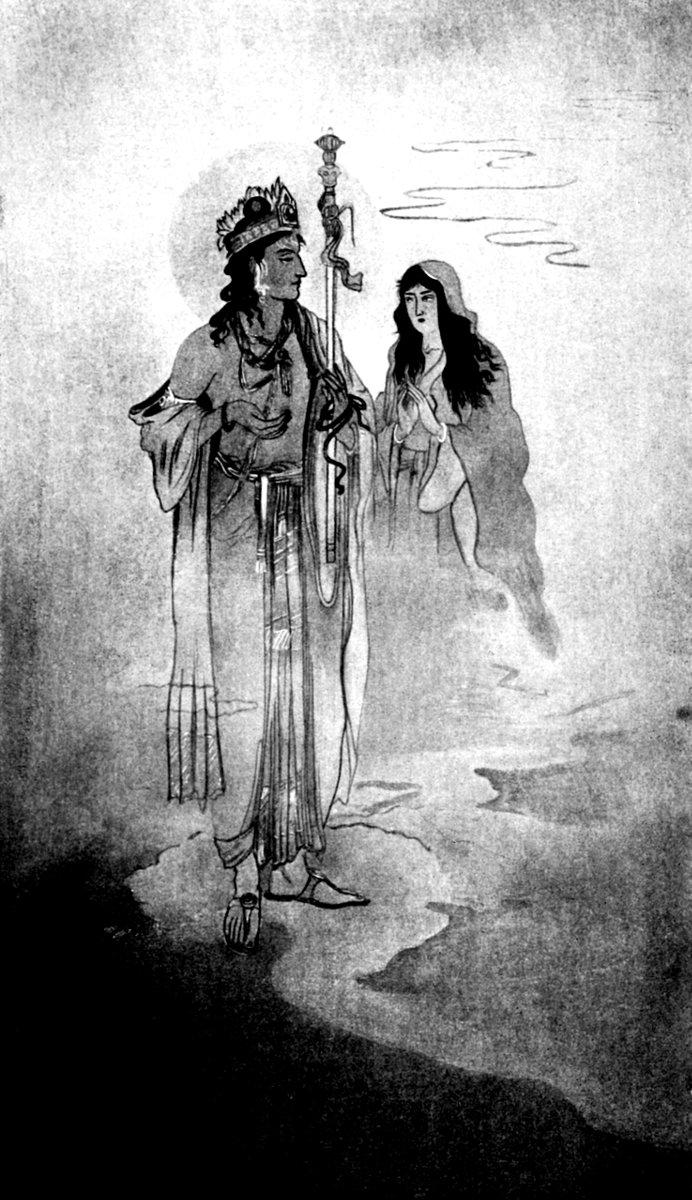
Savitri follows the death god Yama, a painting by Nandalal Bose

Ashvapati and Savitri approached Dyumatsena and Satyavan in the forest to propose the marriage, which was joyfully accepted. Savitri and Satyavan were soon married. Immediately after the wedding, Savitri discarded her jewellery and adopted the bark and red garment attire of a hermit, and lived in perfect obedience and respect to her new parents-in-law and husband. Despite her happiness, she could not stop dwelling on the words of Narada. Three days before the destined death of Satyavan, Savitri started to observe a vow of fasting and stood day and night. Her father-in-law worried that she had taken on too harsh a regimen, but Savitri replied that she has taken an oath to perform these austerities, to which Dyumatsena offered his support. The day of her husband's predicted demise, Savitri offered oblations to the fire and obeisance to the Brahmanas, completing her vow. She joined Satyavan when he went to chop wood. Growing fatigued due to exertion, he conveyed his desire to sleep to his wife, who placed his head on her lap. Yama, the god of death, personally arrived to collect the soul of Satyavan with his noose. Distressed, Savitri followed Yama as he carried her husband's soul away.

When he tried to convince her to turn back, she offered a number of successive homilies. First, she discussed the significance of adherence to dharma, followed by association with the virtuous, the righteousness of compassion, the trustworthiness of the virtuous, and finally the conduct of the virtuous. Impressed at each homily, Yama praised both the content and diction of her words and offered to grant her any boon of her choice, except the life of Satyavan. She first requested the restoration of her blind father-in-law Dyumatsena’s sight and strength, which Yama granted. As they continued, she secured another boon for Dyumatsena to regain his lost kingdom. Pleased by her insight, Yama granted her a third boon, allowing Ashwapati to have a hundred sons to continue his lineage. Even after receiving these favors, Savitri refused to turn back and continued to walk alongside Yama, discussing morality and righteousness. Yama, further impressed, granted her a fourth boon: a hundred sons for herself and Satyavan. At this point, Savitri cleverly argued that the fulfillment of this boon would be meaningless without her husband, as she could only bear sons with him. Yama, realizing her wisdom and devotion, and trapped by his own promise, relented and restored Satyavan’s life and blessed both of them with a long life.

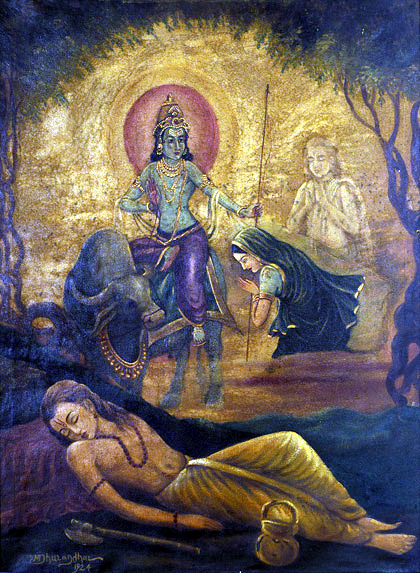
Yama returns Satyavan's soul and blesses Savitri, painting by M. V. Dhurandhar

With Yama’s blessings, Savitri returned to the forest and placed Satyavan’s head on her lap. He regained consciousness, confused, but she reassured him. As Satyavan and Savitri returned, Dyumatsena, having regained his sight, searched anxiously for his son. The sages reassured him, predicting Satyavan’s survival due to Savitri’s virtue. Late at night, the couple arrived at the hermitage, bringing relief to all. Savitri recounted her encounter with Yama and the boons granted — her father-in-law’s sight and kingdom, a hundred sons for her father, and the same for herself and Satyavan. The next morning, messengers announced Dyumatsena’s restoration to the throne, as his usurper has been slain. He returned to his kingdom with his family, and in time, Savitri bore a hundred sons, securing their lineage.

== Themes ==
Scholars have analyzed this story at several interpretive levels - social, philosophical, and Vedic - and they dispute which level is the true one. Nevertheless, they agree that Savitri's victory comes from rhetoric rather than devotion. Furthermore, as listed above, this story is told by the sage Markandeya to Yudhishthira while he is paralyzed; it is from this context these themes arise.

=== Speech ===
It has been noted that Savitri wins by her use of speech. Scholars regard her dialogue with Yama, not her love story with Satyavat, as the heart of the story, as she defeats him not through supernatural force, but through speech. In this dialogue, she first speaks of principles of dharma and then closing in to more personal claims before finally trapping Yama by securing the boon of 100 children which she would need a husband to have. Brad Weiss argues that by speaking in accordance with dharma to Yama, the god of dharma, Savitri ensures that he has no choice but to grant her boons. Kevin McGrath argues that by speaking so prudently and judiciously and placing him in a rhetorical trap, she is able to procure from Death not only her husband, but also 100 sons and the revival of the fortunes of her parents-in-law. Furthermore, Subhash Anand notes that while Savitri certainly acts in a loving manner, what she represents more deeply is love permeated by wisdom; he concludes the story indicates that without this, love is dangerous, and with it human beings can conquer even death.

Both McGrath and Anand suggest her name's etymology, derived from Savitr, the name of the sun before rising, is significantly tied to the power of her speech. The former states that her name reveals her as a force that is "vivifying and thoroughly beneficent" and capable of turning back death - more figuratively, of turning her husband from the darkness to the light, and that her capabilities as a speaker are only outdone by rishis. Furthermore, Anand argues that, by standing at the threshold of dawn, this demonstrates that Savitri stands between darkness and light - or in other words, death and life.

=== Marital fidelity and female autonomy ===
The story is traditionally celebrated as promoting the ideal of pativrata dharma, or marital fidelity. By her devotion to her husband, austerities, and loyalty, sufficient to save her husband from death, Savitri presents a model for wifely fidelity cited in later Hindu texts.

Additionally, Savitri exhibits an unusually expansive degree of self-determination. She chooses her husband not from a pre-selected pool of suitors as in the swayamvara, but rather by herself and out in the world. She selects her husband despite a warning from Narada, she takes her own vows, she follows Satyavan into exile, and she follows Yama and negotiates with him intentionally; altogether, this demonstrates an unusual degree of female autonomy. And in her negotiation with Yama, Savitri's power to save her husband comes not merely from her devotion to her husband, but from her dharmic reasoning and discourse.

As the only child (and daughter) of Ashwapati, the scholar Simon Brodbeck argues that any ancient audience would understand that Savitri is his putrikā, or daughter carrying the family lineage; any husband of hers would lose his children to another lineage, and thus for any honorable family marrying a putrika would have been considered dishonorable. He claims that within the story, men are warded off from marrying her not for her brilliance, which he calls euphemism, but because this putrika status made her an unappealing match. He suggests that the death of Satyavan is a reference to the sort of lineal death any man would go through for marrying a putrika. Additionally, he suggests that Dyumatsena's blindness, powerlessness, and exile comes from his symbolic blindness to the decisions of his son. Under this reading, Brodbeck concludes that Savitri's victory over Yama means that her father would then have sons to continue his lineage, thus preventing Satyavan's lineage from terminating with him. Brodbeck does not present this as the only reading, but argues it represents a meaningful valence within the text.

The extent to which she represents female agency is disputed. Uma Chakravarti argues that Savitri is part of an ideology of chastity and wifely fidelity as the highest duty, categorizing her with a long list of figures meant to impose patriarchal norms on Indian society. However, Subhash Anand argues that Damayanti of the story of Nala and Damayanti shows marital fidelity better, who suffers far more for a husband who abandoned her out of shame and remains loyal; therefore, if the Mahabharata wished to emphasize pure wifely devotion, it would have stressed her more. That the epic instead centers a woman who rhetorically traps Death itself into restoring her husband, Anand suggests that rather than fidelity, this story promotes an ideal of womanhood grounded in wisdom and action rather than wifely devotion alone. Furthermore, the scholar Vidyut Aklujkar notes the story is much different to the other faithful wives of the Hindu tradition, in that Savitri saves her husband herself through her own will from Yama himself; he concludes she has all the qualities of a hero rather than a heroine in the Hindu tradition while being ultimately motivated by love for her husband. Additionally, the Indian English poet Toru Dutt regarded the story as a legacy of a time when Indian women were freer than they were in her contemporary time.

=== Dharma and Moksha ===
The story explores tensions between dharma and moksha. Dharma refers, in this context, to ethics and responsibilities, while moksha refers to release from the cycle of rebirth. The idea of dharma is associated with being a householder, through which one can perform one's obligations among one's kith and kin, while in contrast the idea of moksha is associated with being an ascetic who often withdraw from social bonds; thus, the scholar Brad Weiss argues the two ideas are in conflict. Following her marriage, Savitri discards her jewelry and wears the clothes of a hermit, which Anand considers acting less someone in the grihasta, or householding, stage of life and more in sannyasa, or renunciation. By being both an ascetic and a loving wife, Weiss suggests that she sits in an impossible position between mutually exclusive paths; the story resolves this by demonstrating that a woman can navigate the tension between dharma and moksha by using ascetic powers towards the preservation of her household. And by securing the boon of a hundred children through her negotiation at a place of ascetic strength, he concludes that Savitri secured the continuation of hers and Satyavan's lineage, in a second conquest over death.

Additionally, Yama is within the Hindu tradition regarded as a teacher. This is best shown in the Katha Upanishad, where he teaches Nachiketa the nature of life, death and the soul, in a story which directly parallels that of Savitri. Thus, as per Anand, Savitri's dialogue with Yama represents the two are not adversaries fighting over one person's soul, but two aspects of the same wisdom, one governing death and the other transcendence. Mirroring the wedding ritual, Yama and Savitri walk seven steps; this represents their status as partners, as two complementary aspects of life, one representing sunrise and the other sunset. Thus, he argues, by performing a sort of wedding rite, it demonstrates the inseparability of life and death.

=== Vedic symbolism ===
According to scholar Subhash Anand, Savitri is the embodiment of the Gayatri Mantra, which her father recited for eighteen years to bring her into being, and that the whole story demonstrates what this mantra means and does. Even Satyavan's one year (samvatsara) represents the one year after which a student of the Vedas learns the mantra. Savitri herself is named after the goddess Gayatri, and as said above she exhibits many of the qualities of Savitr, the god the Gayatri Mantra exalts.

He also argues that the story beginning and ending at dawn represents the trajectory of the sun; Yama returning southwards, the direction associated with death, represents its inauspiciousness, while Savitri and Satyavan returning north, in the auspicious course of the sun represents its opposite. Beyond this, he regards Satyavan's name, meaning "the one who has the truth", represents humanity, a contingent being dependent on truth (Brahman), and he needs wisdom, Savitri, to survive. Altogether, he concludes that the love story is only a surface-level reading of a story about how the wisdom of the Gayatri Mantra saves human existence from meaninglessness and death.

A related reading of the deeper Vedic symbolism came from the Hindu philosopher Sri Aurobindo. He argues the Mahabharata story was fundamentally a distilled form of a deeper Vedic story. Satyavan, he suggests, is the soul descended into ignorance while Savitri is divine wisdom come to save it. He also believed this was not mere allegory, but rather living conscious forces that take on human form. This reading led him to write Savitri: A Legend and a Symbol in an effort to recover these meanings, a 24,000 line English language epic poem which his followers regard as scripture.

Additionally, scholar Dominik Haas suggests that this story was the first time that the goddess Savitri was brought together with the Vedic goddess Surya Savitri, a daughter of Surya, and that in this context, it had a "comical aspect", by fusing the qualities of a solar and a mantric goddess into one being, whose qualities ended up simultaneously exhibited by the heroine of this story; additionally, he argues it helped to turn the Gayatri Mantra into a person rather than simply a metaphorical mantra goddess. He also states that Savitri the heroine had many qualities of the Vedic goddess, including choosing her husband herself and having a quality of reviving a dead husband through her "radiance".

=== Comparative mythology ===
This story has also been spoken of in terms of its parallels to other stories in world cultures. Within Hinduism, it has a parallel to Nachiketa meeting Yama in the Katha Upanishad, in that it features a philosophical discourse with the god of death. More narrowly, others have compared to stories in which one of two lovers is taken to the land of the dead and the other tries to save them, and especially to stories outside the Hindu religion. Philosopher Sister Nivedita and author Anthony Horowitz have compared this story to that of Alcestis, and scholar Vidyut Aklujkar further points to the stories of Orpheus and Eurydice and Laodamia and Protesilaus, which he argues have both similarities and differences.

Aklujkar notes that, despite the similarities, in the story of Orpheus, the death of Eurydice is accidental and Orpheus lacks Savitri's determination in saving her love. Additionally, Orpheus secures a boon from Hades not from determined pleading, but because he stops singing and Hades takes pity on him. Further discussing the story of Laodamia, he notes that like in Savitri the death is preordained and it is the woman who is left behind upon the death of her husband; however, he also notes that Laodamia only gets back her husband for three hours, after which in some renditions of the story she commits suicide. Aklujkar concludes that, the grand difference is that Savitri does not grieve for her husband and instead saves him with determination and without giving up. He suggests that it is precisely these differences which gives her story such importance within the Hindu religion. Beyond this, the scholar Ravi S. Varma argues that while Orpheus and Savitri are equally loving towards their spouses, the story of Savitri has a more ferocious protagonist in seeking hers returned, and the story expounds philosophy the story of Orpheus lacks.

Scholar Herman Lommel has additionally noted similarities to Southeast African stories, including in Zimbabwe recorded by Leo Frobenius in his collection Erythraa, as well as the story of Isis and Osiris, and of the descent of Inanna into the Underworld of Tammuz and Ishtar.

== Influence ==
The new age group 2002 released two albums inspired by the story of Savitri and Satyavan, namely Savitri (1995) and The Emerald Way (2006).

=== Festivals ===
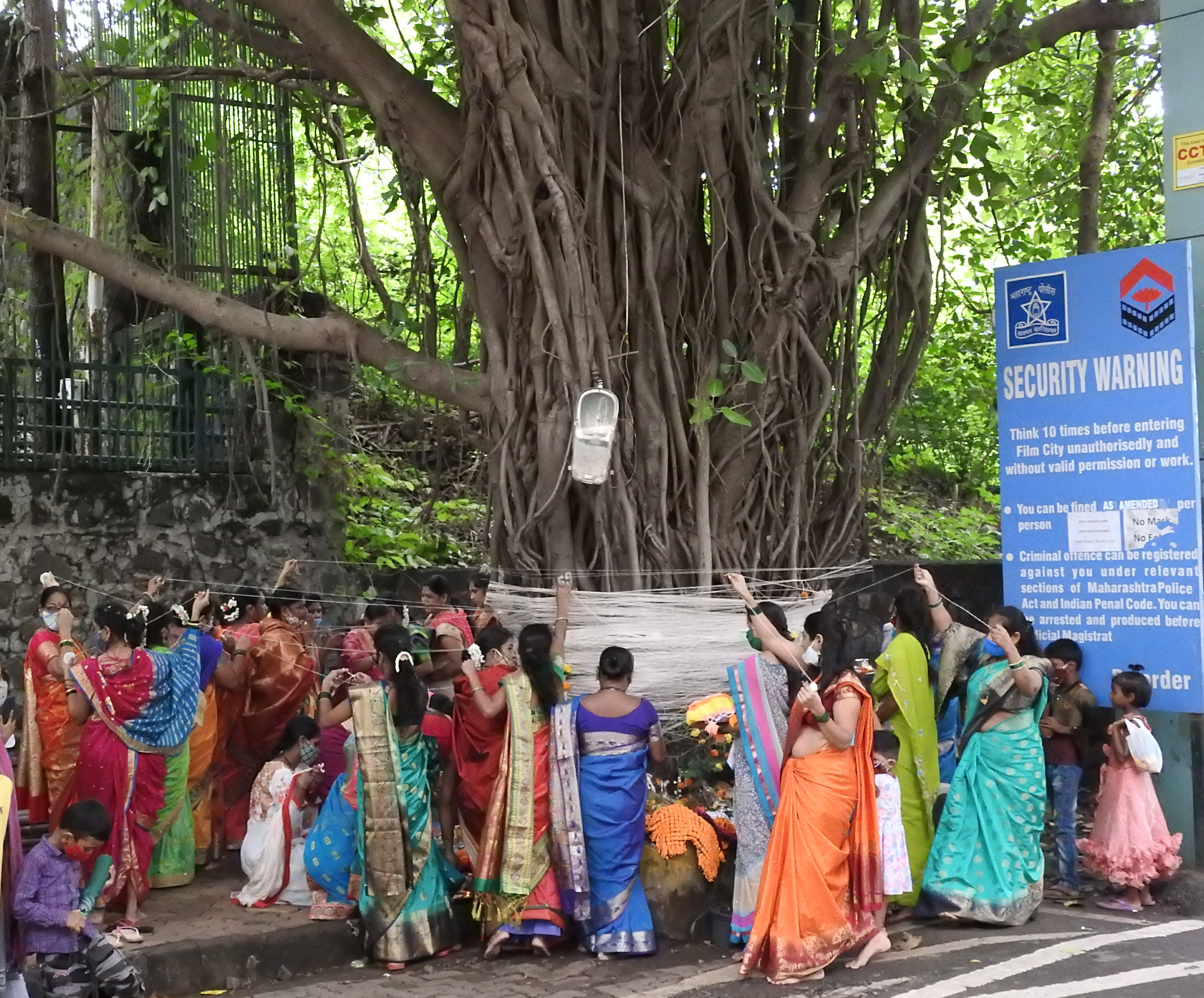
Married women tie a thread around a banyan tree on the Vat Purnima day.

In Bihar, Jharkhand, and Odisha, married women observe Savitri Vrata on the Amavasya (new moon) day in the month of Jyestha every year. This is performed for the well-being and long life of their husbands. A treatise entitled Savitri Brata Katha in the Odia language is read out by women while performing the puja. In Western India, the holy day is observed on the Purnima (full moon) of the month as Vat Purnima. In both of these festivals, women water a banyan tree and wound a thread around it, as local folklore holds that this is the type of tree Savitri achieved the enlightenment to prevail over Yama. In India, many women are named "Savitri".

Karadayan Nonbu is a festival celebrated in Tamil Nadu which honors Savitri's devotion to Satyavan. On this day, married women and young girls wear yellow threads around their necks and pray to Hindu goddesses for long lives for their husbands.

=== Literature ===
==== Sri Aurobindo's Savitri ====
Sri Aurobindo wrote an English language epic poem titled Savitri: A Legend and a Symbol. This poem was first published in 1950, with earliest known manuscripts dating back to 1916, with Sri Aurobindo working on it through multiple revisions until his passing in 1950. This poem is not understood as a translation or an expansion, but rather his attempt to recover what he regarded as the Vedic core of the story. Aurobindo's Savitri stands at almost 24,000 lines in length; thus, it is over twice the length of Paradise Lost by John Milton. Aurobindo's followers regard this as scripture in its own right, with some going so far as to declare it the Veda of the future.

Within the poem, Aurobindo turns Savitri from an exceptional woman into an avatar of the goddess Gayatri, sometimes called Savitri, and endowed with not only rare beauty, but also comprehensive knowledge of many philosophies, sciences, arts and crafts, who came down to earth because Ashwapati prayed for her to do so. Satyavan's father, the "Lord of the Shining Hosts" Dyumatsena, is the divine mind blind to its true, and with it his sight and his kingdom. Ashwapati himself is depicted as a great yogi, the "Lord of Tapasya", seeking for humanity to be imbued with the qualities of divinity, and upon seeing a vision he realizes his daughter must discover her companion, somewhere, to fulfil this. After a year of experiences and meeting rishis, Savitri meets Satyavan and the two fall into deep love and marry shortly after. Opposition to their union comes not from Ashwapati, who is a seer who would have no reason to dispute it here, but from his wife Malavi.

When Yama takes Satyavan with him, Savitri follows and walks into the shadow realm, shocking Yama who had never seen anyone walk so far in his direction. Savitri and Yama have lengthy philosophical dialogues over the nature of life and death. Yama yields not merely because Savitri ties him in a rhetorical trap, but because Savitri has shown Yama her spiritual growth exceeds his; when he speaks of the impermanence of life and the dangers of attachment, she responds by demonstrating herself to be the Divine loving itself, a response which forces Yama to yield. Thus, Aurobindo turned this Mahabharata story into a far longer poem by which he could elucidate his philosophy of Integral Yoga. He also regarded the poem as not an allegory, but rather living, conscious forces taking human form.

The literary scholar K. R. Srinivasa Iyengar praised the poem as "superbly articulate as well as incandescently evocative", and he argued that rather than merely revealing what Aurobindo regarded as the Vedic substrate of the Mahabharata story, Aurobindo's Savitri renews the story by using it to answer contemporary threats of apocalypse. In his view, the poem declares that just as Savitri saved Satyavan, so too could spiritual wisdom save humanity from the contemporary threats of his era.

==== Others ====
The Indian English poet Toru Dutt wrote an English ballad on Savitri. It uses the story to project ideals of the New Woman with agency, education, freedom of choice, and intellectual strength, marrying by choice, expressing sexual desire openly, and freely moving out of the zenana, in a critique of contemporary Indian gender norms. Through this, she sought to construct an Indian feminism in its own ancient culture rather than transplant western ideas

The English poet and journalist Edwin Arnold wrote, as part of his 1883 collection Indian Idylls, a verse-rendering of the story as Sâvitrî; or Love and Death. He told the story in a manner to project an order first destabilized, then fixed through Yama's boons restoring Satyavan's life and the couple as king and queen, to project an image of India as a land of immutable tradition which, even if temporarily overthrown, always found itself restored.

The Irish Hindu nun and philosopher Sister Nivedita wrote "Savitri: The Indian Alcestis" as part of Cradle Tales of Hinduism, an introduction to stories from Hindu theology written for western audiences, told as they were to children. She compared and contrasted the story to that of Alcestis.

The Indian politician K. Santhanam wrote a Tamil short story, "Savitri" (1963). He set the story in contemporary Madras, about a girl named Savitri. Upon the day her husband is said to die, her mother is taken seriously ill, he comes to the hospital and almost dies in an accident before waking up with Savitri watching. Scholar Vidyut Aklujkar notes that this Savitri is a "pale shadow" of the original, lacking her steadfast faith, and that the story here is about the fight between reason and faith rather than life and death.

Self-described mythologist Devdutt Pattanaik wrote Sati Savitri: And Other Feminist Stories They Don't Tell You, where he retold stories from Hindu, Buddhist, and Jain theology in a manner to highlight feminist components. Among them was the story of Savitri, which he noted as a reversal of the damsel in distress despite its reputation as a reactionary, patriarchal story.

=== Theater ===
In England, Gustav Holst composed a chamber opera in one act in 1916, his Opus 25, named Savitri based on this story. The work is notable for stripping down the story to three characters, Savitri, Satyavan, and Death (Yama), in what Holst regarded as the story's spiritual core and laying the story between the poles of humanity and mysticism. Rather than having Savitri prevail over Death through laying an elaborate rhetorical trap, instead it has her do so by having her ask for the boon of life in all its fullness, and upon Death granting it, informing him that such fullness would be impossible without Satyavan. Scholar Simon Brodbeck situates it in the context of Orpheus and Eurydice, an extremely popular subject for opera (see List of Orphean operas), reading this opera as another variant of this story.

In Thailand, King Vajiravudh wrote a Thai play based on the story of Savitri in 1924. A drama, this play was based on an English translation, as he did not know Sanskrit. This was part of a wider project of translating theater from around the world into Thai.

As a response to Holst's Savitri, librettist Jaspreet Kaur and composer Sarah Sayeed wrote an opera of their own, Savitri (reimagined) (2021) based on Savitri so that South Asian artists could "reclaim Sāvitri’s voice and bring their perspective to the story".

=== Films and television ===
There have been about thirty-four film versions of the Savitri/Satyavan story produced in India.

One of the earliest is the Indian silent film, Satyavan Savitri (1914) directed by Dadasaheb Phalke. It did get controversy for its lackluster performance from the actress playing Savitri, and for portraying Yama riding a female buffalo despite a male buffalo being his proper mount; despite this, this film would be notable as his third film and third hit, sufficiently so that it became considered foundational to the Indian film industry.

Other silent-era films include the failed Savitri (1912) by V. P. Divekar, A. P. Karandikar and Shree Nath Patankar, Sukanya Savitri (1922) by Kanjibhai Rathod, Sati Savitri (1927) by Baburao Painter, Sati Savitri (1931) by Bidkar. The 1923 version, Savitri also called Satyavan Savitri, was an Italian co-production directed by Giorgio Mannini and J. J. Madan, produced by Madan Theatres Ltd. and Cines. Sati Savitri (1932), a sound film, was released in Hindi/Gujarati by Chandulal Shah and was the second talkie Gujarati film.

Sati Savitri (1933) was the first film produced by the East India Film Company. Directed by C. Pullaiah, it received an Honorary Certificate at the Venice Film Festival. This movie is notable for its lavish budget of ₹75,000, for being a commercial hit, and for beating out another Telugu language movie made by H.M. Reddy on the same story, Sati Savitri, released a few days later.

Bhalji Pendharkar released Savitri (1936) in Marathi. In 1937, Savitri was produced in Hindi directed by Franz Osten. Sathyavaan Savithiri (1933), Savithri (1941) by Y. V. Rao were also made during British rule in India.

Many films, centering on this story, were made after independence (especially in South India) and included: Telugu language film versions of the story in 1957, 1977 and 1981. Satyavan Savitri (1948), Mahasati Savitri (1955) by Ramnik Vaidya, Savitri (1961) by Phani Majumdar, Satyavan Savitri (1963) by Dinesh Rawal, Sati Savitri (1964) by Shantilal Soni, Sati Savitri (1965) by P. R. Kaundinya, Mahasati Savitri (1973) by Chandrakant, Sathyavaan Savithri (1977) by P. G. Viswambharan, Savithri (1978) by T. S. Ranga, Sati Savitri (1982) by Girish Manukant, Savitri (1983) by Murlidhar Kapdi, Maha Sati Savitri (1983) by Sona Mukherjee.

The Tamil-language film Doctor Savithri (1955) is an adaptation of the story to then-contemporary times, making it about a doctor investigating a murder, after her husband was arrested for the crime.

Another Tamil-language film adaptation of the story bringing it to contemporary times is Roja (1992). This is notable for making the story about a woman saving her husband from Kashmiri separatists, for being a commercial success not only in Tamil, but also in Hindi, Telugu, Malayalam, and Marathi, and for being nominated for Best Film at the 1993 Moscow International Film Festival.

Savitri - EK Prem Kahani, an Indian television series which aired on Life OK in 2013 is a modern adaptation of the story.

Savitri by Pavan Sadineni and Waarrior Savitri (2016) by Param Gill are modern-day adaptations of the tale. The latter was controversial for its depiction of Savitri as a 21st-century woman. Reporter Jana Ritter noted that this outrage was stirred up by depicting Savitri in sexually charged scenes and sitting backless in Las Vegas.

Satyawaan Savitri was a 2022 big budget Marathi TV series airing on Zee Marathi based on this story. A failure, it was cancelled after one month and 48 episodes.

== See also ==
- Alcestis
- Orpheus and Eurydice
- Pativrata
- Sunulembi
