= Varalakshmi Vratam =

Hindu observance

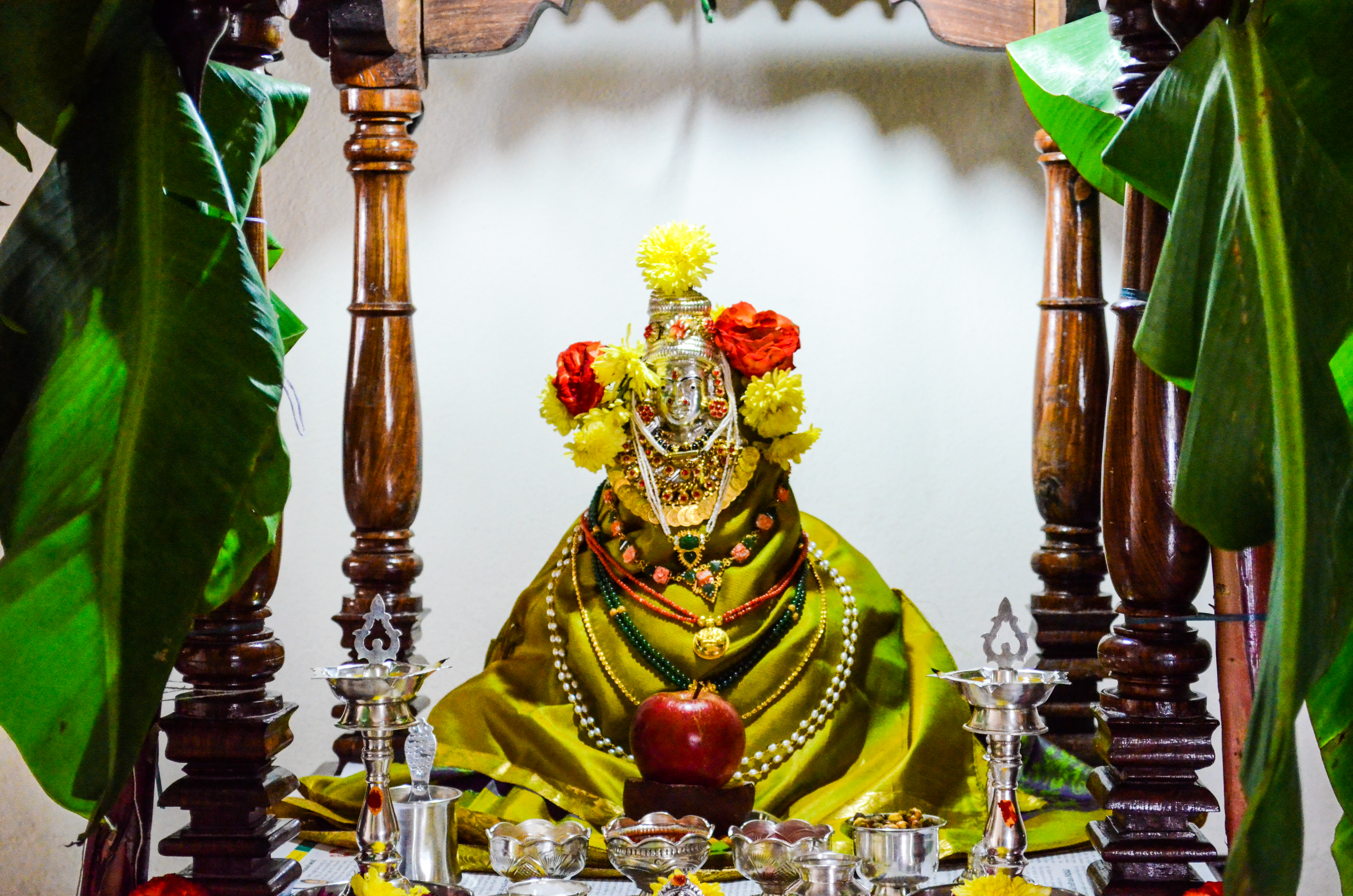
- Murti of Lakshmi decorated for the occasion
- Also called: Varalakshmi Puja, Varalakshmi Nombu, Varalakshmi Habba
- Observed by: South Indian Hindu women
- Significance: Religious
- Observances: Puja
- Frequency: Annual

Varalakshmi Vratam (Sanskrit: वरलक्ष्मी व्रतम्, romanized: Varalakṣmī Vratam) is a Hindu observance to propitiate the goddess of prosperity, Lakshmi. Varalakshmi is the manifestation of Lakshmi who grants boons (varam). It is a puja primarily performed by married Hindu women in the states of South India. This occasion is observed on the Friday before the day of the full moon - Purnima - in the Hindu month of Shravana, which corresponds to the Gregorian months of July – August.

The Varalakshmi Vratam is primarily performed by married women (sumangali), for their own well-being, and in order to ask the goddess to bless their husbands with health and longevity.

== Ceremony ==
On this occasion, women worship the goddess Lakshmi with utmost devotion, offering fruits, sweets and flowers, usually a kalasha (representing the deity) is decorated with a sari, flowers and gold jewellery, with offerings placed in front.

The puja begins with the formal welcome of Lakshmi into one's house. A wooden tray or a stand is placed outside the house's threshold. Rangoli is drawn in the puja room, usually inside the house. A kalasham (a brass or silver pot) is placed on the tray outside the house. The pot is decorated with mango leaves as well as flowers. Auspicious items such as rice, betel leaves, turmeric sticks, bananas, and coins are placed inside the pot. A thread dipped in turmeric is tied around the neck of the pot. A coconut scrubbed with turmeric is placed on the top of it. In some traditions, the face of the goddess may be drawn on the coconut, or a brass or silver face may be kept on the pot and decorated with kumkuma, turmeric, and sandalwood powder. During an auspicious hour, the women sing a song of greeting to Lakshmi, and carry the tray and kalasham into the puja room. After lighting the lamp and performing the arati, shlokas, and songs of the goddess are recited. The yellow thread is untied, and a piece is given to each girl or woman to tie around her right wrist. This is symbolic of the conclusion of the auspicious puja, as well as receiving the blessings of the deity. This is also worn to signify protection and piety, and several articles are given as gifts and charity in good faith. In Tamil Nadu, it is a day to prepare four varieties of kolukattai, payasam, and vadai for the naivedyam, or offering. The next day, the Lakshmi puja is performed. Cooked rice, chickpeas, fruit, and betel leaves are offered to all the women who had participated. The face of the goddess is turned towards the west, and the kalasham with its contents placed inside a drum of rice, symbolically keeping the goddess safely inside the house until the next occasion.

=== Story of the vow ===
The festivities of this occasion often end with the recitation of the vrata katha, the story of the vow that offers it its religious significance.

According to one story, a Brahmin woman named Padmavati, known to be pious and dutiful to her husband, as well as reputed to assist the sick, poor, and the needy, was observed by Lakshmi in the kingdom of Kosala. Greatly pleased, the goddess instructed her to perform the occasion on the given date in the month of Shravana so that she could achieve salvation.

In a similar story, a virtuous and honest woman named Charumati, devoted to her husband and in-laws, receives a dream from Vishnu. The deity tells her to worship the goddess Lakshmi every year during the month of Shravana, which would avail her the blessings of his consort, as well as all forms of wealth.

== Significance ==
Some of the rituals that are performed on this occasion are regarded by some scholars to be significant:

The essences of the goddess, indeed of all females, are said to be arishina and kunkum [sic]. ... Turmeric, though applied to the exterior of the female, to her skin, enlivens her interior life, layering her from within, adding depth and texture. She glows more intensely from within. ... Her self-shining seems also to signal the intensification of coherence and integrity, equalities of selfness, the qualities of depth. . . . Through the essences of turmeric and vermilion, goddess and woman overlap, periodically, momentarily.

== Gallery ==
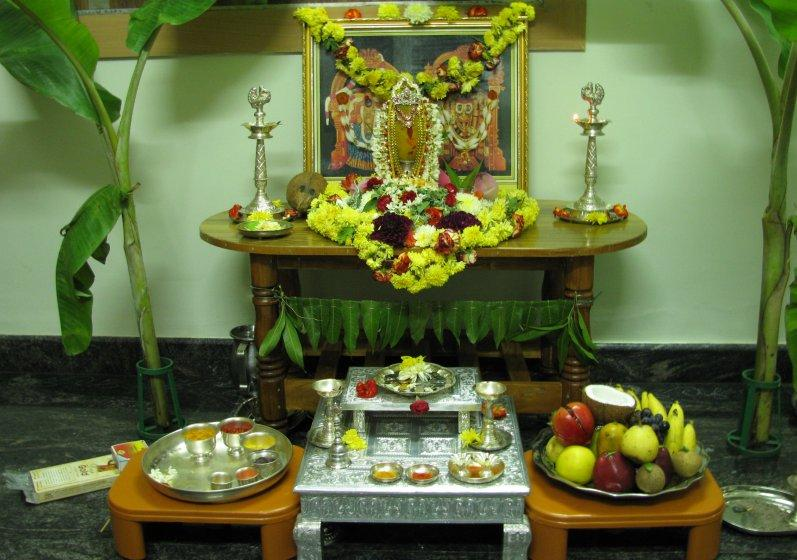
Images of Lakshmi venerated on Varalakshmi Vratam

== See also ==
- Karva Chauth
- Savitri Vrata
