= Karadaiyan Nonbu =

Tamil Hindu observance

Karadaiyan Nonbu (Tamil: காரடையான் நோன்பு) is a Hindu festival celebrated by Tamil women. It is observed for the longevity and welfare of their husbands and for those seeking virtuous husbands. It is marked on the first day of the month of Panguni in the Tamil calendar.

== Legend ==
The festival is rooted in the legend of Savitri and Satyavan from the Hindu epic Mahabharata. According to the legend, Savitri was a devoted princess who used her wit and devotion to reclaim the life of her husband, Satyavan, from Yama, the god of death. When Satyavan's destined time to die arrived, Savitri followed Yama as he carried her husband's soul away. Impressed by her persistence and eloquent arguments, Yama offered her several boons, excluding the life of her husband. For her final wish, Savitri requested that she be blessed with a hundred sons. When Yama granted the wish, Savitri pointed out that she could not fulfill this blessing without her husband being alive. Bound by his own word, Yama was forced to restore Satyavan to life.

== Observances ==
Married women mark this occasion by praying to the goddess Parvati for the well-being of their husbands, seeking that they are never separated. They also observe a vrata (fast) on this day. Before the auspicious time begins, women perform ritual purifications, draw kolam in front of their puja rooms, and offer a dish made of rice flour and jaggery to the goddess called an adai.

Women ritually wear a yellow thread around their necks called a saradu for their husbands' longevity during this occasion.
