= Vata Purnima =

Observance by Hindu married women

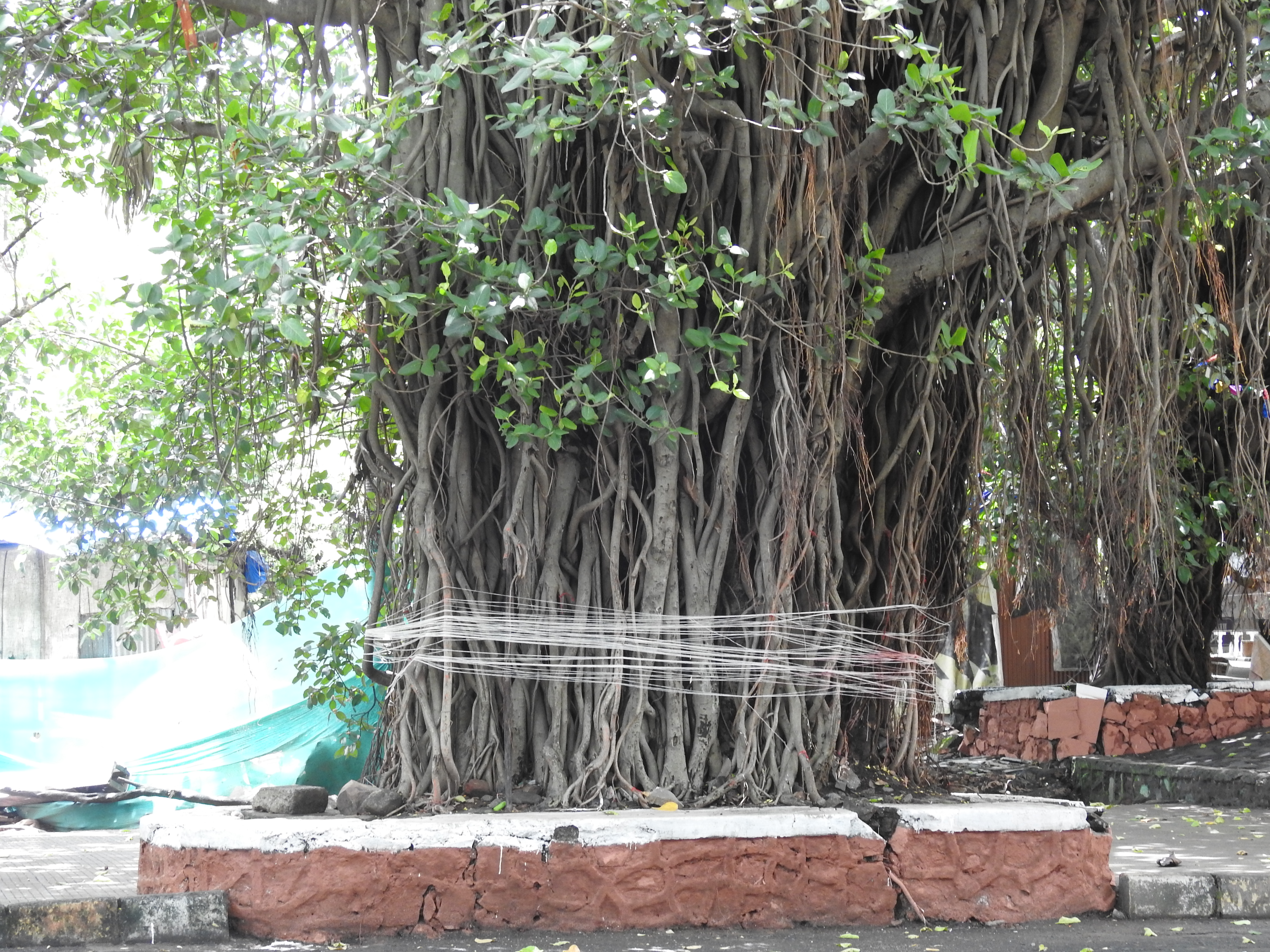
- Threads tied around a banyan tree (vata)
- Observed by: Married women, particularly in Northern and Western India
- Type: Hindu
- Significance: Honouring the fidelity of Savitri to Satyavan; Honouring the fidelity of wives to their husbands
- Begins: 13th day of the month of Jyeshtha
- Ends: 15th day of the month of Jyeshtha
- Date: Jyeshtha Shukla Trayodashi, Jyeshtha Shukla Chaturdashi, Jyeshtha Purnima
- Frequency: Annual

Vata Purnima (Vaṭapūrṇimā, also called Vat Savitri) is a Hindu festival observed by married women in North India and in the Western Indian states of Maharashtra, Goa, Gujarat. On this purnima (full-moon day) during the three days of the month of Jyeshtha in the Hindu calendar (which falls in May–June in the Gregorian calendar), a married woman marks her love for her husband by tying a ceremonial thread around a banyan tree. The celebration is based on the legend of Savitri and Satyavan as narrated in the epic Mahabharata.

== Etymology ==
Vata Purnima is derived from Sanskrit, with vata meaning the banyan and purnima meaning the full moon.

== Legend ==
The legend behind Vata Purnima originates from the Mahabharata. When the childless King Asvhapati and his consort Malavi prayed for a son, the god Savitr appeared and granted them a daughter, who was named Savitri in his honour.

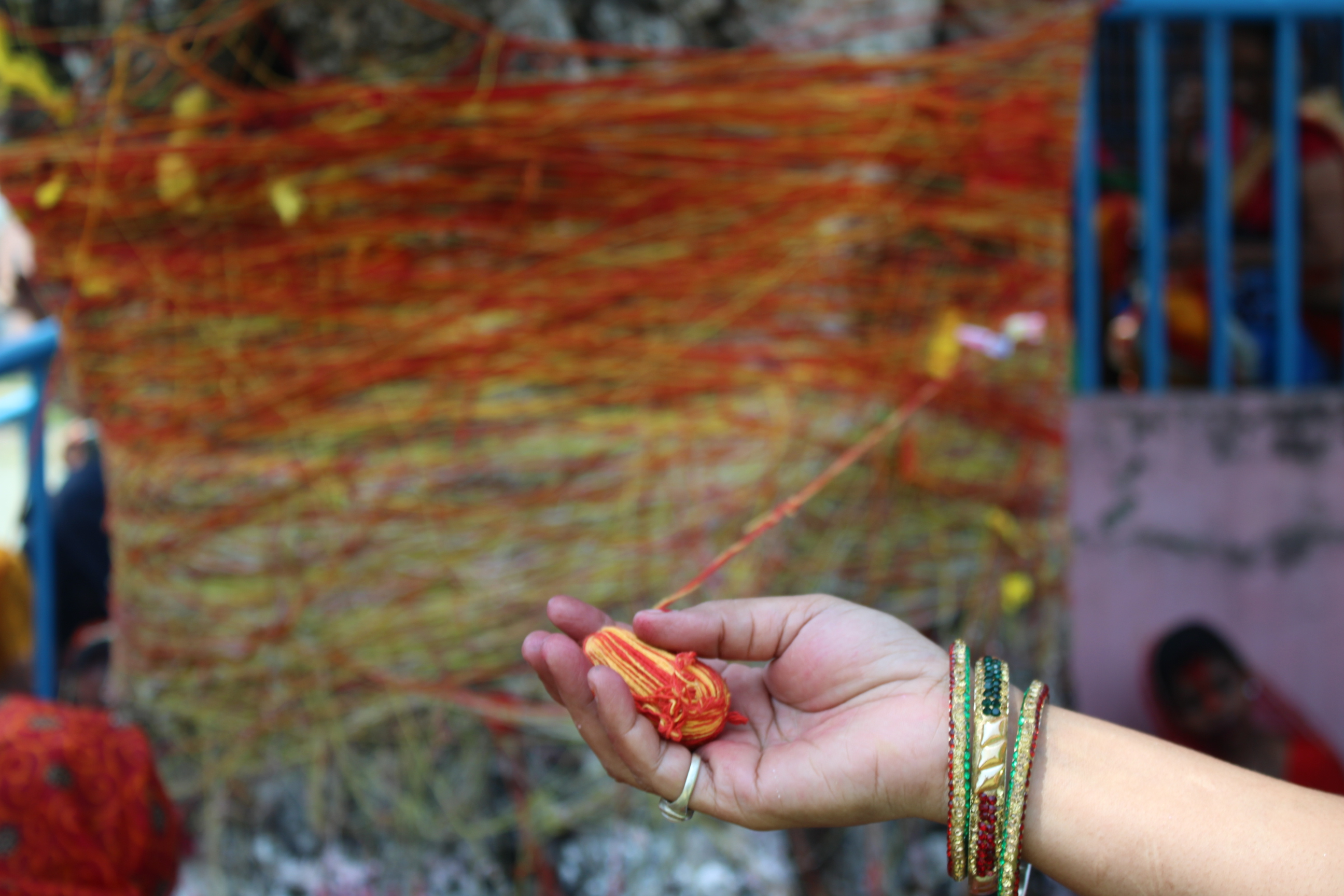
A woman tying a thread around a banyan tree

Because her beauty and purity intimidated men, no man dared ask for her hand in marriage. Her father instructed her to find a husband on her own. During a pilgrimage, she selected Satyavan, the son of the blind, exiled king Dyumatsena. Although Sage Narada warned King Ashvapati that Satyavan was destined to die in one year from that day, Savitri insisted on the marriage.

Three days before the foreseen death of Satyavan, Savitri took a vow of fasting and vigil. The morning of Satyavan’s predicted death, while splitting wood, he suddenly became weak, and laid his head in Savitri’s lap to rest. According to the festival's legend, he died on her lap, and Savitri placed his body under the shade of a vata (banyan) tree. Yama, the god of death, arrived to claim Satyavan's soul. As Yama left, Savitri followed him, stating that was her duty as a wife to follow her husband. Moved, Yama offered her a few wishes, with the exception of her husband's life.

She first asked for the restoration of her father-in-law's eyesight and kingdom, then a hundred children for her father, and finally a hundred children for herself and Satyavan. The last wish created a dilemma for Yama, as it would indirectly grant the life of Satyavan. Impressed by her cleverness, he offered her one more chance to choose any boon, this time omitting the restriction. Savitri instantly asked for Satyavan to return to life, which Yama granted.

Satyavan awakened as though he had been in a deep sleep and returned home with his wife. Meanwhile, Dyumatsena regained his eyesight before their return, and his ministers arrived with news of the death of his usurper, allowing the king and his entourage to return to their kingdom.

Although the tree plays a secondary role in the story, it is worshipped during the festival to commemorate the legend.

== Observances ==
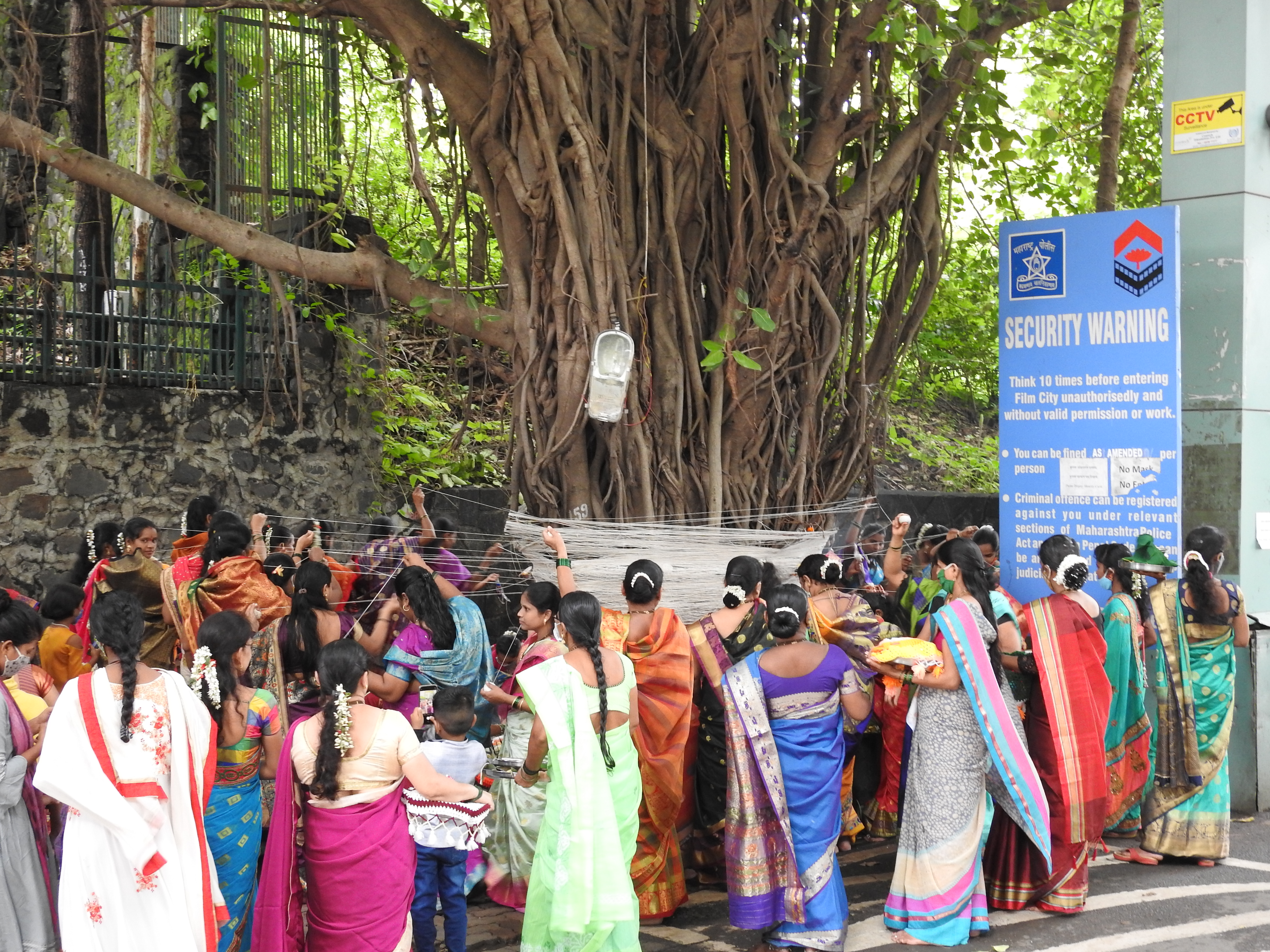
During Vata Purnima, married women tie threads around a banyan tree.

The festival is celebrated in the Northern and Western Indian states of Uttarakhand, Maharashtra, Goa, and Gujarat. The period of the festival is observed over three days, usually the 13th, 14th, and 15th days in the month of Jyeshtha (May–June).

=== Fast and tradition ===
On the occasion of Vata Purnima, women undertake a fast of three days for their husbands, as Savitri did. During the three days, pictures of a vata (banyan) tree, Savitri, Satyavan, and Yama, are drawn with a paste of sandalwood and rice on the floor or a wall in the home. The golden engravings of the couple are placed in a tray of sand, and worshipped with mantras (chanting), and vata leaves. Outdoors, the banyan tree is worshipped. A thread is wound around the trunk of the tree, and copper coins are offered. Strict adherence to the fast and tradition is believed to ensure a long and prosperous life the husband for his next seven lives. During the fast, women greet each other with "Janma Savitri ho" (English: "Become a Savitri").

B. A. Gupte (Note: An ancient Indian mythologist who specialized on the laws of nature.) provides a Puranic excerpt to suggest that the mythology behind the festival is symbolic of natural phenomena. He notes that it is the representation of the annual wedding of the earth and nature represented by Satyavan and Savitri, similar to the way the earth "dies" every year and is rejuvenated by the powers of nature. He points out that the vata tree was likely chosen due to the mythological aspects connected to the tree that are known to Indians.

In the present day, women dress in fine saris and jewellery, and their day begins with the offering of any five fruits and a coconut. Each woman winds white thread around a banyan tree seven times as a reminder of their husbands. They fast for the whole day.

== See also ==
- Snana Yatra
