= History of marriage in California =

The recorded history of marriage in California is long and encompasses a period as far back as the first Spanish missions and even further back in unrecorded history of Indigenous Californians and their marriage history.

== California Native American period ==
While the Native Americans of California did not document their culture in the same way western civilization did, we still have a great deal of knowledge from archaeological evidence as well as the earliest records of the Spanish missions.

Native communities in southern California of the Chumash Indians, practiced Matrilocal residence. The husband would move to the community of the wife. The exception to this rule being the chief, whose wife would move to live with the chiefs community. The chief was also the only one of the community with the option of multiple marriage.

== Jesuit Missionary period 1697–1767 ==
The founding of the California missionary system by the Spanish began in 1697 located in Baja with the founding of Nuestra Senora de Loreto. Several times during the Jesuit period, Indians revolted against church doctrine against polygamy.

Clemente Guillen, S. J., of Delores mission in Baja California reported in 1744 that he had destroyed the tables and paraphernalia of the Indian shaman and that same year Joseph de Torres Pereas noted the survival of marriage ceremonies indicated that shaman had been convincing adults not to accept baptism.

== California natives and the Spanish missions, 1785–1810 ==
While the Franciscan Missions strived to incorporate the native California Indians into their fold, they worked hard to eliminate all marriage and family customs the Spanish Catholic Church disapproved of or found repugnant.

The church was anxious to legitimize the marriages of natives through Catholic ceremonies. Northern California Missions recorded the marriage of 2300 marriages of Native Americans previously joined by native custom with five thousand new unions and ten thousand neophyte widows and widower remarried.

Marriage between native Indian woman and Spanish men was encouraged by the California missions to increase the population and Spanish political power. Rape and other forms of violence was however a concern. Spanish Soldiers and settlers of a patriarchal colonial society put native woman in a vulnerable state.

Author, Charles Francis Saunders has documented the details of a California Mission wedding ceremony from the 1890s in his book, "Capistrano Nights – Tales of a California Mission Town".

== 1829 Carrillo-Fitch elopement ==
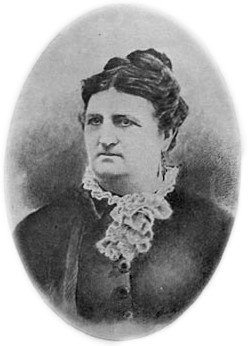
Josefa Carrillo Fitch

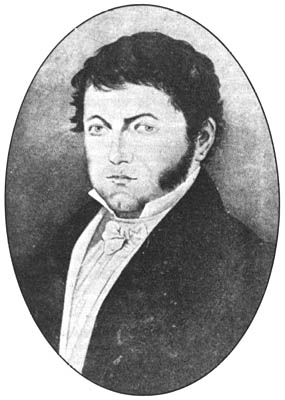
Henry Delano Fitch

In 1829 a controversy erupted when the Spanish Governor was asked to intervene in the marriage between a local San Diego Spanish woman and a foreigner.

Maria Antonia Natalia Elija Carrillo was born November 27, 1810. Called Josefa, after her grandmother, she was the eldest of thirteen children born to Maria Ygnacia Lopez and Joaquin Victor Carrillo. Influential and socially well connected, the family was related to several other prominent Californians of the day. At the time the youth of California were pressured to marry early.

Instead of marrying another Californian, Carrillo fell in love with American merchant seaman, Henry Delano Fitch. Fitch formally requested the hand of Maria Antonia in 1827.

On April 15, 1829, the ceremony was in progress, but was stopped by order of Governor Jose Maria Echeandia. It is believed that the Governor was enraged by Carrillo's choice of a man who refused to naturalize as a citizen, as well as rumored smuggling activity.

The couple eloped in Valparaiso Chile and upon returning to California 1830, Echeandia announced the marriage as "Illegal" and had Fitch imprisoned and placed Carrillo in Deposito, the practice of separating couples to ascertain if they married of their own accord.

Carrillo was held in San Gabriel and Fitch in Monterrey. In December 1830, ecclesiastic authorities found the marriage valid but not legitimate under canon law. To end the scandal, the couple was ordered to pay penance in the order of attending special mass and reciting prayer.

== 1850 statehood to 1872 ==
On September 8, 1850, California entered the US as the 31st state of the union. At the time marriage statutes described marriage as "a civil contract to which the consent of the parties is required" with gender specific pronouns applied to "husband" and "wife". Later court decisions and some statutes dating from both statehood and the 1872 codification of the civil law state; "Any unmarried male of the age of 18 years or upward and any unmarried female of the age of 15 years old or upward are capable of consenting to and consummating marriage." The code makes no mention of what gender may marry which.

=== Interracial bans ===
In 1850, "all marriages of white persons with Negroes or mulattoes [were] declared to be illegal and void". This stricture held until 1948, at which point the California Supreme Court became the first state court in the country to strike down a law prohibiting interracial marriage, recognizing marriage as a fundamental right:

Marriage is thus something more than a civil contract subject to regulation by the state; it is a fundamental right of free men. There can be no prohibition of marriage except for an important social objective and by reasonable means. No law within the broad areas of state interest may be unreasonably discriminatory or arbitrary. ... The right to marry is as fundamental as the right to send one's child to a particular school or the right to have offspring. Indeed, "We are dealing here with legislation which involves one of the basic civil rights of man. Marriage and procreation are fundamental to the very existence and survival of the race." (Skinner v. Oklahoma, supra, at p. 541.) Legislation infringing such rights must be based upon more than prejudice and must be free from oppressive discrimination to comply with the constitutional requirements of due process and equal protection of the laws.

=== Poorly kept records ===
While the state required records be kept on marriage certificates and contracts as early as 1851, it wasn't until 1858 that any further information was kept, such as births, divorce and death. At that time the office of the state Registrar was created.

== Contemporary same-sex history ==
In 1971, Gov. Ronald Reagan signed legislation making civil nuptials gender-neutral under the law as part of the Women's Liberation Movement in California.

In 1977, Asb. Bruce Nestande (R- Orange County) wrote AB 607 at the behest of the Orange County Clerks Association to exclude same sex couples from civil marriage.

In 2000, The Knight Initiative (Prop 22; CA DOMA) passes with 61.2% of the vote.

In 2001, same-sex couples (including Davina Kotulski and Molly McKay) from Marriage Equality USA began asking for marriage licenses in Los Angeles and San Francisco. The issue of same-sex marriage reemerged in 2004, when Mayor of San Francisco Gavin Newsom directed the city-county clerk to issue marriage licenses to same-sex couples, citing the California Constitution's guarantee of equal protection under the law to all groups. The marriages were quickly annulled by the California Supreme Court, and the city of San Francisco issued a legal challenge that was consolidated with other challenges to California's marriage laws. Meanwhile, the California legislature twice passed, and twice received vetoes from governor Arnold Schwarzenegger on, bills that would have legalized same-sex marriages in the state.

On May 15, 2008, at a time when only the Massachusetts Supreme Court had ruled favorably on same-sex marriage, the California Supreme Court ruled on the 2004 San Franciscan challenge with other cases in the watershed In re Marriage Cases. Applying strict scrutiny to the state's discrimination between heterosexual and other citizens, marriage was found to be a fundamental right that may not be denied based on sexual orientation, and the relevant laws were struck down.

Social conservatives and other dissenters capitalized on the case to renew its thrice-unsuccessful push to amend the Constitution of California to restrict marriage to being between opposite-sex couples, and with unprecedented support from the Catholic and LDS churches, succeeded by a slim margin of votes. One year later, the proposition was verified as legal by the California Supreme Court, but not held to be retroactive, so the state of California only recognizes opposite-sex marriages, except for the same-sex marriages granted before the constitutional change in 2008 (including 18,000 marriages granted by California and possibly same-sex marriages granted by other jurisdictions before that date, although a test case has not yet arisen). Prop 8 was eventually overturned by the United States District Court for the Northern District of California but a stay was placed on same sex marriages until an appeal could be heard by the United States Court of Appeals for the Ninth Circuit. Both, Governor Jerry Brown and Attorney General, Kamala Harris had declined to defend the proposition during the appeals process, so the Ninth Circuit allowed the proponents of the amendment to stand for the state government and appeal the decision. The Ninth Circuit affirmed the ruling of the district court in 2012, and the amendment's proponents appealed to the United States Supreme Court. On June 26, 2013, the Supreme Court ruled 5–4 in Hollingsworth v. Perry that the appellants had no standing to appeal. They remanded the case to the Ninth Circuit and vacated their ruling, leaving only the district court's ruling stand. Same-sex marriages resumed two days later when the Ninth Circuit lifted the stay on the district court's ruling.
