= Marriage equality (disambiguation) =

Marriage equality refers to the legal recognition of union between two persons without distinction as to their sex or gender. See same-sex marriage.

Marriage equality may also refer to:

== Law ==
- Marriage Equality Act (Vermont), a 2009 law enacted in the U.S. state of Vermont
- California Marriage Equality Act, a ballot initiative attempted in 2009 and 2010 in the U.S. state of California
- Marriage Equality Act (New York), a 2011 law enacted in the U.S. state of New York
- Hawaii Marriage Equality Act, a 2013 law enacted in the U.S. state of Hawaii
- Marriage Equality (Same Sex) Act 2013, a 2013 law enacted in the Australian Capital Territory, but later reversed
- Thirty-fourth Amendment of the Constitution (Marriage Equality) Bill 2015, an amendment to the Constitution of Ireland enacted by voter referendum
- Marriage Equality Act (Thailand), a 2024 law enacted in Thailand

== Groups ==
- Marriage Equality USA, an organization founded in 1998
  - Marriage Equality Express, a project of Marriage Equality USA
- Marriage Equality California, an organization founded in 1998, now defunct

== See also ==
- Equal marriage (disambiguation)
- Marriage (Same Sex Couples) Act 2013, UK
