= Marriage Equality Express =

American activist

The Marriage Equality Caravan, or Marriage Equality Express, was an educational bus tour organized by the California chapter of Marriage Equality USA, in response to the invalidation by the California Supreme Court, on August 11, 2004, of 4,000 same-sex marriages that had taken place between February 12 and March 11 of that year. The tour was led by Davina Kotulski, Molly McKay, Belinda Ryan, Wendy Daw, Jacqueline Frank, and Bev Senkowski.

== Tour ==
On October 4, 2004, 44 activists including Kotulski, McKay, California marriage case plaintiffs Stuart Gaffney and John Lewis, Roland Torres Q TV, Karen Ocamb, Out Word, Mike Kepka and Rona Marech, a photographer and reporter for the San Francisco Chronicle, and Unitarian Universalist ministers Helen Carroll and John Millspaugh, left California and traveled across the country, stopping in 13 states and hosting same-sex marriage forums and panels at universities and churches. The trip culminated in the first national same-sex marriage rally in Washington, DC, on October 11, 2004, National Coming Out Day. The rally featured the Hawaii Marriage Case Plaintiff Genora Dancel; Beth Robinson, attorney in the Vermont Freedom to Marry case; Reverend Jimmy Creech, a Methodist minister who was defrocked for marrying same-sex couples and leader of Soulforce; Dr. Sylvia Rhue of the National Black Justice Coalition; Robin Tyler, organizer for LGBT rights marches in Washington, DC, and founder of StopDr.Laura.com; Kathy Kelly of Marriage Equality Georgia; a performance from musicians Tuck and Patti; and politicians Mark Leno and Eleanor Holmes Norton. Marriage Equality Caravaners also told their stories.

Time and Parade magazines mentioned the rally when describing same-sex marriage activism as one of the top 10 issues of 2004.
