= Barry Schuler =

American businessman

- Born: September 7, 1953 (age 73); Jersey City, New Jersey, U.S.
- Education: Rutgers University (B.S.)
- Known for: CEO of AOL (2000–2003)

Barry Martin Schuler (born September 7, 1953) is an American Internet entrepreneur and former chairman and CEO of America Online Inc. He is best known for leading the AOL team that simplified the online service provider's user interface, making it possible for millions of consumers to gain easy access to the Internet.

== Early life and education ==
Schuler grew up in West New York, New Jersey. As a youth, Schuler was encouraged early on by his parents to explore the arts as well as electronics. He turned his family's basement into a darkroom while helping his father, a warehouse owner and part-time repair man, tinker with television sets and other gadgetry.

In the mid-1970s, while completing a bachelor's degree in psychology at Rutgers University, Schuler became captivated by filmmaking. In 1976, he left the university to produce and direct commercial and industrial films. An avid computer hobbyist and reader of Popular Electronics, Schuler befriended a group of technical enthusiasts who were developing software applications for microcomputers. After assembling a do-it-yourself IMSAI computer and experiencing first hand the potential of at-home computing, Schuler saw the technology's ability to positively disrupt and enhance the way people lived and worked.

== Career ==
=== Early companies ===
In 1978, he established CMP Communications, an advertising and marketing company devoted to helping high tech entrepreneurs spread the word about the impending revolution in microcomputing.

Schuler quit CMP in 1988 and took a position as president and CEO of Cricket Software, overseeing the development and marketing of color desktop applications for Apple Computer's Macintosh, including a Postscript driven drawing program. Cricket also developed the first color, graphical desktop presentation software, "Cricket Presents". Cricket was ultimately sold to Computer Associates International in 1991.

Schuler was President of San Francisco-based Jasmine Technologies from 1989 to 1990. Jasmine was a leading Macintosh peripherals developer that buckled under the weight of bitter lawsuits and mounting customer dissatisfaction. Jasmine declared bankruptcy in March 1990 and Schuler resigned shortly thereafter.

Looking to take advantage of the opportunities that a new "Interactive" medium would bring, Schuler teamed up with Tracy Schuler and David Goldman shortly after and established Medior Inc., a multimedia development company, Medior Inc. In 1994, the company entered into a joint venture with, Apple Computer Inc., and Redgate Communications and launched 2Market, considered to be the first rich media online shopping service. That same year, AOL (America Online) also enlisted Medior's help designing its product to give consumers with little or no computing expertise easy access to its online information services. While at Medior, Schuler and company co-developed a music creation game with Nick Tenbrock and Gary Levenberg of San Francisco-based Interactive Audio. The software, called Rock, Rap and Roll, allowed Macintosh users to quickly build soundtracks in a variety of musical styles. Medior also collaborated with Time Warner, one of its clients, on the building of the world's first digital, switched, interactive broadband communications network delivering a range of services. The service was launched in December 1994 in Orlando, Florida.

=== AOL ===
In 1995, Medior was acquired by AOL. Schuler, brought over from Medior by AOL founder and CEO Steve Case, was charged with helping him and then president Ted Leonsis to transform the online service provider into a broad based, consumer-driven medium. Schuler worked his way up the ranks at AOL becoming president of its Interactive Services group in 1998. During this time, he led the design team that integrated an Internet browser directly in AOL's proprietary user interface (version 5.0) making it possible for millions of computer users to access the Internet through a Web-based portal. He also advocated the opening up of AOL's proprietary message service known as IM, a key development that allowed its subscriber base to "chat" electronically over the Internet with non-AOL computer users free of charge. By January 2001, the same month that AOL announced its merger with Time-Warner, the company's 26 million subscribers were sending an estimated 660 million instant messages daily.

It was on the heels of the Time Warner merger that Schuler was appointed chairman and CEO of the AOL unit. He was charged with finding ways to turn AOL into an interactive outlet for Time-Warner's various media divisions, which included film, music, television and publishing. The goal was to transform AOL into a high-speed, Internet-based," one-stop shop for movies, music, interactive video games, phone service, and more."

In a July 2, 2001 article, BusinessWeek reporter Amy Borrus wrote that Schuler, "deserves just as much credit for AOL's explosive success" as then AOL Time Warner Inc. Chairman Steve Case or co-Chief Operating Officer Robert Pittman. The reporter pointed to the three years Schuler spent running AOL's Interactive Services group, "putting his stamp on much of the design that makes it so simple to use and features that make it so popular with families." Schuler's objective of converging a souped-up version of AOL's online distribution platform with Time Warner's various media outlets hit several roadblocks one being reluctance on the part of cable companies to open up their network to Internet service providers such as AOL. Likewise, internal dissent over the best ways to merge AOL's distribution channels with Time Warner's more traditional media content plagued the online unit. Against this backdrop, AOL was struggling with declining advertising sales due to an economic downturn as well as a leveling out of its still dial-up driven subscriber growth. The unit took a further hit when its parent was forced to restate its earnings forecast in January 2002, in part due to the slowdown in AOL's business. Schuler stepped down as head of the unit in April 2002, taking over a newly created digital development unit charged with overseeing the formation of interactive digital products and services for all of AOL Time Warner. He officially resigned from AOL-Time Warner in 2003.

=== Post-AOL ===
Shortly after his departure from AOL, Schuler found himself invited to invest in a start up Ablation Industries, Inc. Ablation Industries, Inc was commercializing (Ultrashort pulse laser) USP laser technology funded by the U.S. government's Defense Advanced Research Projects Agency, also known as DARPA. When Mr Schuler invested in the company, the name of the company was changed to Raydiance, where he raised a significant amount of venture capital funding to help commercialize new technologies of national interest, among them ultrashort pulse lasers. A form of optoelectronics, the lasers emits short pulses of highly concentrated energy that can be used to break down atoms. In 2004, Schuler joined Raydiance Inc. to develop commercial applications for ultra-short pulse lasers. In July 2007, Wired Magazine reported that Raydiance had signed a deal with the U.S. Federal Drug Administration (FDA) to explore laser therapies, ranging from common laser eye treatments to the cell-by-cell tumor ablation.

In addition to being CEO of Raydiance, Schuler was on the boards of UBMatrix, Hands On Mobile, UU See, Synthetic Genomics, and Visto. Schuler is an investor in Adirondack Pictures. He also co-produced and helped finance the film Look, a drama shot entirely from the point of view of surveillance cameras. Written and directed by Adam Rifkin with Brad Wyman as his fellow producer. The film was digitally shot in high-definition with all the special effects, post production and music done on Apple's Macintosh computers in a "virtual studio" setting. Look, released in December 2007, is distributed by Liberated Artists, another Schuler venture. It won the Grand Jury Prize at the 2007 CineVegas Film Festival. It also won Special Jury Prize at The Lone Star International Film Festival and was an official selection in both AFI Fest and The Chicago International Film Festival.

In 2005, Schuler, John Fisher, Randy Glein, and Mark Bailey co-founded DFJ Growth, a venture capital firm that invests in disruptive technology companies at the growth stage. The firm focuses on partnering with founders and their companies at the scaling and hypergrowth phase of development. Notable investments in Schuler’s portfolio include Coinbase (NASDAQ: COIN), Formlabs, Foursquare, Giphy (Facebook), Glowforge, Good (Blackberry), Helix, NotCo, Patreon, Tumblr (Yahoo!), and Unity (NYSE: U)

Schuler lives in Napa, California. A vocal proponent of public education reform, he co-founded the Blue Oak School, an independent, not-for-profit entity for students, kindergarten through eighth grade. Schuler is a national advisory member for the New Technology Foundation, a non-profit organization established in 1999 with the objective of achieving national education reform. Using the New Technology High School in Napa as a prototype for encouraging innovative academic objectives, NTF provides interested schools with training, tools and access to expertise developed through the NTHS school site. Through his affiliation with the foundation, Schuler has helped drive and co-funded the implementation of Internet-based technology to establish a project-based learning methodology consistent with the implementation of the 21st Century Learning Initiative.

Schuler is a member of the Rutgers Hall of Distinguished Alumni.

=== Meteor Vineyard ===
Schuler and Tracy Schuler co-own Meteor Vineyard, located in the Coombsville region of the Napa Valley, with winemakers Bill and Dawnine Dyer. Meteor Vineyard is a 22-acre (89,000 m^{2}) property established in 1998.

Through 2004, Meteor Vineyard's grapes were sold in bulk to a handful of Napa Valley properties including Dyer, Arietta, Etude and Vineyard 29. In 2005, they produced a single-vineyard Cabernet Sauvignon bottled under the Meteor Vineyard. The team bottled their first vintage later that year, and the wine was released beginning 2008.

Soil conditions in the Coombsville area are a mix of well-draining river rock and mineral-rich volcanic ash, both of which are considered suitable for Bordeaux varietals, including Cabernet Sauvignon.

Business positions
Preceded by Steve Case	CEO of AOL; 2001–2002	Succeeded by Robert W. Pittman
