= Dawnine Dyer =

American winemaker (born 1950)

Dawnine Sample Dyer
- Born: July 3, 1950 (age 76)
- Education: University of California, Santa Cruz
- Occupation: Winemaker
- Years active: 1974 - present
- Employer: Dyer Vineyard
- Spouse: Bill Dyer

Dawnine Sample Dyer (born July 3, 1950) is an American winemaker and entrepreneur who pioneered the use of champagne-making methods in California's fledgling sparkling wine industry in the 1970s.

== Biography ==
Dyer, a California native with a degree in biology from the University of California, Santa Cruz, began her wine career in 1974, at the Robert Mondavi Winery in Oakville, the heart of the Napa Valley grape-growing region.

In 1976, Dyer was recruited for the Napa Valley start-up Domaine Chandon, the first French-owned California sparkling wine venture in the United States. Charged with monitoring quality control, she was paired with a French winemaking team from Domaine Chandon’s parent company, Moët & Chandon, which included veteran enologist and winemaker Edmond Maudiere. Cast in the role of Maudiere's protégé, Dyer oversaw a series of winemaking trials aimed at creating a naturally fermented sparkling wine based on both Old and New world styles and techniques, including France's Methode Champenoise. At the time, only a half dozen sparkling wine producers existed in the United States, among them Korbel, Kornell and Schramsberg. The effort resulted in California's first sparkling wine made from Pinot Meunier, a black grape typically used in Champagne for additional depth and maturity. A separate effort led by Dyer resulted in a still wine also made from the Pinot Meunier varietal.

Over the course of her 24-year tenure at Domaine Chandon, Dyer rose up through the ranks of the Yountville-based winery, ultimately becoming vice president and principal winemaker. In this capacity, she oversaw all winemaking at the 400,000-case winery and also worked with its parent company in France. In 1986, Dyer helped found Domaine Chandon’s sister winery in Australia's Yarra Valley, and also oversaw export products for the company's winery facility in Argentina. It was during this period that Dyer joined forces with other winemakers and grape growers in calling for the creation of Geographic Indications and Appellations of Origin for America's wine growing regions, including the Napa Valley AVA.

While at Domaine Chandon, Dyer and husband Bill, a respected winemaker in his own right, planted a 2.5-acre (10,000 m^{2}) cabernet sauvignon vineyard in the Diamond Mountain District AVA of the Napa Valley, and began making earthy Bordeaux-style wines from the hillside estate. In 2000, she left Domaine Chandon to devote more time to Dyer Vineyard, which produces 400 cases of wine per year. The estate-grown cabernet is known for its minerality and deep berry flavors, characteristics associated with wines produced in the higher elevation Diamond Mountain AVA. In the 2004 book by Matt Kramer, New California Wine: Understanding the Napa Valley, Sonoma, Central Coast and Beyond, the Wine Spectator columnist credited the Dyers with creating "great cabernets" produced in "minute" but "superb quality".

Dawnine and Bill Dyer have been the winemakers for Sodaro Estate Winery in Napa since its inception.

In 2005, the Dyers partnered with former America Online Inc. Chairman and Chief Executive Barry Schuler and his wife, Tracy Strong Schuler, to create a cabernet sauvignon blend, branded Meteor Vineyard, made from grapes grown on the Schulers' 22-acre (89,000 m^{2}) vineyard in the Napa Valley’s Coombsville region. The hilltop vineyard, which previously sold its grapes to acclaimed Napa Valley labels including Dyer, Lail, Favia, Arietta, Etude and Vineyard 29, bottled its first vintage under the Meteor label in 2005, with a release date of February 2008. In the September 2007 issue of Decanter, U.K. wine authority Steven Spurrier commended the Meteor team, including Dyer, for its 2005 vintage after sampling the wine at a recent barrel auction. In an article, he described the blend as having "smooth, spicy fruit” and "plush tannins”. Spurrier organized the Paris Wine Tasting of 1976 in which French and California wines were tasted side-by-side in the first serious competition between the two countries.

During her career, Dyer has served as president of the Napa Valley Vintners Association (NVV) and president of Napa Valley Wine Technical Group, and was a member of the founding board of Women for WineSense, a national 12-chapter association founded in 1990. Through her work with the NVV, she has become a recognized voice for the importance of Geographic Indications and Appellations of Origin to the Napa Valley and has been invited to speak on the issue in Geneva, Beijing, Lima, and Bordeaux. She lectures for the annual Wine Industry Executive program at the UC Davis Graduate School of Management and sits on the board of directors for Frog's Leap Winery. She is also a judge for several professional wine competitions, including the U.S.-based National Women's Wine Competition.

The Dyers have been married since 1981. The couple lives full-time on their Diamond Mountain estate. Their wine properties are held by the limited liability company, Dyer Straits Wine Co.
