= Josefa Carrillo =

Californio landowner and manager of Rancho Sotoyome (1810–1893)

Josefa Carrillo Fitch
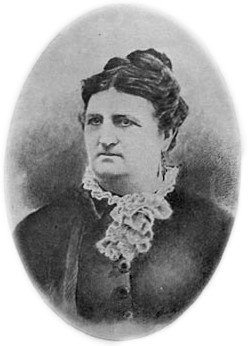
- Josefa Carrillo Fitch
- Born: March 18, 1810; San Diego, Spanish California
- Died: December 26, 1893 (aged 83); Healdsburg, California, U.S.
- Other name: Doña Josefa Carrillo de Fitch
- Known for: Manager of Rancho Sotoyome
- Spouse: Henry D. Fitch (m. 1829–1849)
- Children: 11
- Relatives: Carrillo family of California

Josefa Carrillo Fitch (1810 – 1893) was a Californio landowner and member of the Carrillo family of California. She was the wife of American sea captain Henry D. Fitch, and after his death in 1849 she settled on his Rancho Sotoyome, near present-day Healdsburg, California, where she defended her title to the grant through years of debt and litigation.

== Early life and marriage ==
Josefa Carrillo was born in San Diego, then part of Spanish California, a daughter of Joaquín Carrillo. Her family produced several prominent political and military figures in early California.

Henry D. Fitch proposed after his baptism into the Catholic Church, but church authorities would not permit the marriage, partly because Fitch was a foreigner; Governor José María de Echeandía was also said to be interested in Carrillo. With help from her cousin Pío Pico, the couple eloped aboard the American ship Vulture in 1829 and married in Valparaíso, Chile. When they returned in 1830 they were arrested and charged with offenses against church and state, but the marriage was later declared valid. They had eleven children.

== Rancho Sotoyome ==
In 1841 Governor Juan B. Alvarado granted Henry Fitch Rancho Sotoyome in present-day Sonoma County, and in 1844 he received an addition from Governor Manuel Micheltorena. Fitch hired managers, first Cyrus Alexander and later Moses Carson, to run the rancho.

After her husband's death in 1849, Josefa briefly ran the Fitch store and took over his accounts. By 1855 she was deeply in debt and faced several lawsuits over defaulted loans, while bringing her own cases to secure her inheritance. She and her children moved to Rancho Sotoyome, where squatters had settled on much of the land. A claim for the rancho was filed with the Public Land Commission in 1852, and after several contests she was confirmed in title to most of the property; the grant was patented to her in 1858. Several public land sales were held in the meantime, including one by the county to pay her taxes.

== Later life ==
Josefa Carrillo Fitch lived at Rancho Sotoyome until her death in 1893.

== See also ==
- Carrillo family of California
- Healdsburg, California
