= Cyrus Alexander =

1800s California rancher

- Born: March 15, 1805; Tioga County, Pennsylvania, United States
- Died: December 27, 1872 (aged 67); Rancho Sotoyome, Sonoma County, California, United States
- Occupation: Landowner
- Known for: Early settlement of Sonoma County, California

Cyrus Alexander (1805–1872) was an early settler of Sonoma County, California.

Cyrus Alexander was born in Pennsylvania, and his family soon moved to Illinois. In 1831, Alexander was in the Rocky Mountains trapping for the Sublette fur company. He arrived in San Diego in 1833, where he worked for Captain Henry D. Fitch and became a Mexican citizen.

In 1840, Alexander embarked on a scouting expedition for a suitable tract of land for a cattle ranch for Fitch and came to the Russian River Valley. From 1841 to 1845, Alexander managed Fitch's Rancho Sotoyome Mexican land grant under an agreement that at the end of four years, Alexander was to receive two square leagues of land and part of the ranch stock.

In 1844, Alexander married Rufina Lucero (1830-1908), the sister of William Gordon's wife, Maria. In 1845, Moses Carson, brother of Kit Carson, took over management of Rancho Sotoyome. Alexander then settled on his tract in what is now called Alexander Valley and began construction of an adobe dwelling on the East side of the Russian River.

Alexander filed a claim in 1853 for his 2 square leagues (part of Fitch's 1841 grant), but it was rejected by the Public Land Commission.

Cyrus Alexander died on his ranch December 27, 1872. Rufina died there also on March 18, 1908.
