= All God's Children (1996 film) =

1996 film by Sylvia Rhue

- Cover art by Mark Durham
- Directed by: Sylvia Rhue; Frances Reid; Dee Mosbacher
- Cinematography: Frances Reid
- Release date: 1996
- Running time: 26 Minutes
- Country: United States
- Language: English

All God's Children is a 1996 documentary film directed by Sylvia Rhue, Frances Reid and Dee Mosbacher. The film features interviews with Reverend Jesse Jackson, Senator Carol Moseley-Braun, Congresswoman Maxine Waters, Quincy Jones and Harvard professor Cornel West. Kenneth Reeves says the film's primary focus is to counteract the conservative Christian Coalition's attempts to provoke "suspicion and hate in the Black Church against gays and lesbians."

== Background ==
Mosbacher stated that the film was created to address the effects of a video titled Gay Rights, Special Rights, that was produced by Lou Sheldon, who was once the chairman of Traditional Values Coalition. Mosbacher says Sheldon's video, which was widely distributed to African-American churches, "portrays a distorted image of gay and lesbian people." Mosbacher said it is crucial to debunk the allegations made in the film, to "keep the religious right from dividing two minority groups who share common interests."

Sheldon is featured in his video, which includes interviews with former U. S. Attorney General Edwin Meese and Christian Coalition leader Ralph Reed.

== Synopsis ==
The documentary analyses the relation between Christianity and sexual orientation in the context of the African-American community, and attempts to alleviate stigmatization of lesbians and gay men. Mixed with spiritual music, it tells stories of gays and lesbians in African-American churches. The film also features interviews with Reverend Jesse Jackson, Senator Carol Moseley-Braun, Congresswoman Maxine Waters, Quincy Jones and Harvard professor Cornel West.

== Critical reception ==
L.A. Times author Lynell George states in his article "Breaking the Barriers That Keep Them From Church" that the goal of this film is to educate people about the troubles which gay and lesbian believers face when trying to find and be accepted into a Church. The gay/lesbian community is afraid to leave the security of the familiar. "What feeds this silence is the fear of losing one's safety net, one's spiritual comfort zone." He summarizes the biggest obstacle to overcome is other peoples willingness to support the gay/lesbian community. He says, "This is why the support of family, clergy and policymakers is the linchpin." With the support of these people, all people regardless of sexual preference or gender identity would feel safe within a church home. He says the fear of not having this support keeps the gay/lesbian community away from the church and silent, not allowing a safe place for spiritual growth. He states if we truly know who we are as people we should allow others to be who they are without judgement. He feels this is the best solution to the barriers keeping gays and lesbians from the Church.

Wendy Conklin wrote in the Diversity Factor that "the Christian African American community, which knows what it is to be discriminated against, speaks powerfully about issues of discrimination based on sexual orientation. A strong educational tool directed at African Americans, but useful for all underrepresented groups." She underscored that the film is "interwoven with music, and intricately layered stories that unfold on the screen, creating a tapestry of spiritual understanding and the Black Church's embracement of African American lesbians and gay men as dedicated members of its spiritual family."

American historian D. Michael Quinn noted the documentary made a point about how: "African Americans were accused of seeking 'special rights' during the Civil Rights Movement of the 1960s. Now, lesbian, gay, bisexual and transgendered (LGBT) people are accused of seeking 'special rights.' Both populations are simply seeking equal justice under the law."

== Accolades ==
- Best Documentary during the National Black Arts Film Festival (1996)
- Best Film on Matters Relating to the "Black Experience" (a Black International Cinema Competition in 1996)
- Special Merit Award from the National Black Programming Consortium
- Lambda Liberty Award, Lambda Legal Defense and Education Fund (1997)
- Jury's Choice Award at the University of Oregon Queer Film Festival
- Apple Award, by National Educational Media Network (1997)
- Screening Honoree at the Council on Foundations Film Festival Series (1997–98)

== See also ==
- African-American culture and sexual orientation
