= Rancho Quesesosi =

Mexican land grant in California

Coordinates: 38.700°N 121.920°W

Rancho Quesesosi (also called "Gordon's Ranch") was an 8,894-acre (35.99 km^{2}) Mexican land grant in present-day Yolo County, California given in 1843 by Governor Manuel Micheltorena to William Gordon. The grant, west of Woodland, extended 2 leagues along both sides of Rio de Jesús María, now known as Cache Creek. The grant was between Rancho Cañada de Capay on the west and Rancho Rio de Jesus Maria on the east.

== History ==
William Henry Gordon (1801-1876), a native of Ohio, was a fur trapper who went to New Mexico in 1823, where he married Maria Lucero (1805-1844), her sister being the wife of Cyrus Alexander. Gordon and his family came to California with the Workman-Rowland Party, arriving in Los Angeles in 1841. In 1842 Gordon went north to Sonoma, and in 1843, was granted the two square league Rancho Quesesosi, becoming the pioneer settler of Yolo County. His wife died in 1844, and in 1855, Gordon married Elizabeth Corum. William Gordon's daughter, Maria Isabel Gordon (1831-1890), married Nathan Coombs in 1844. William Gordon and Nathan Coombs purchased Rancho Chimiles in 1851.

A claim for Rancho Quesesosi was filed with the Public Land Commission in 1852 and the Quesesosi grant was patented to William Gordon in 1860.

Gordon lived on the ranch until 1866, when he sold it, and moved to Cobb Valley in Lake County, where he died in 1876.
