= Jimmy Creech =

American Methodist minister and activist (born 1944)

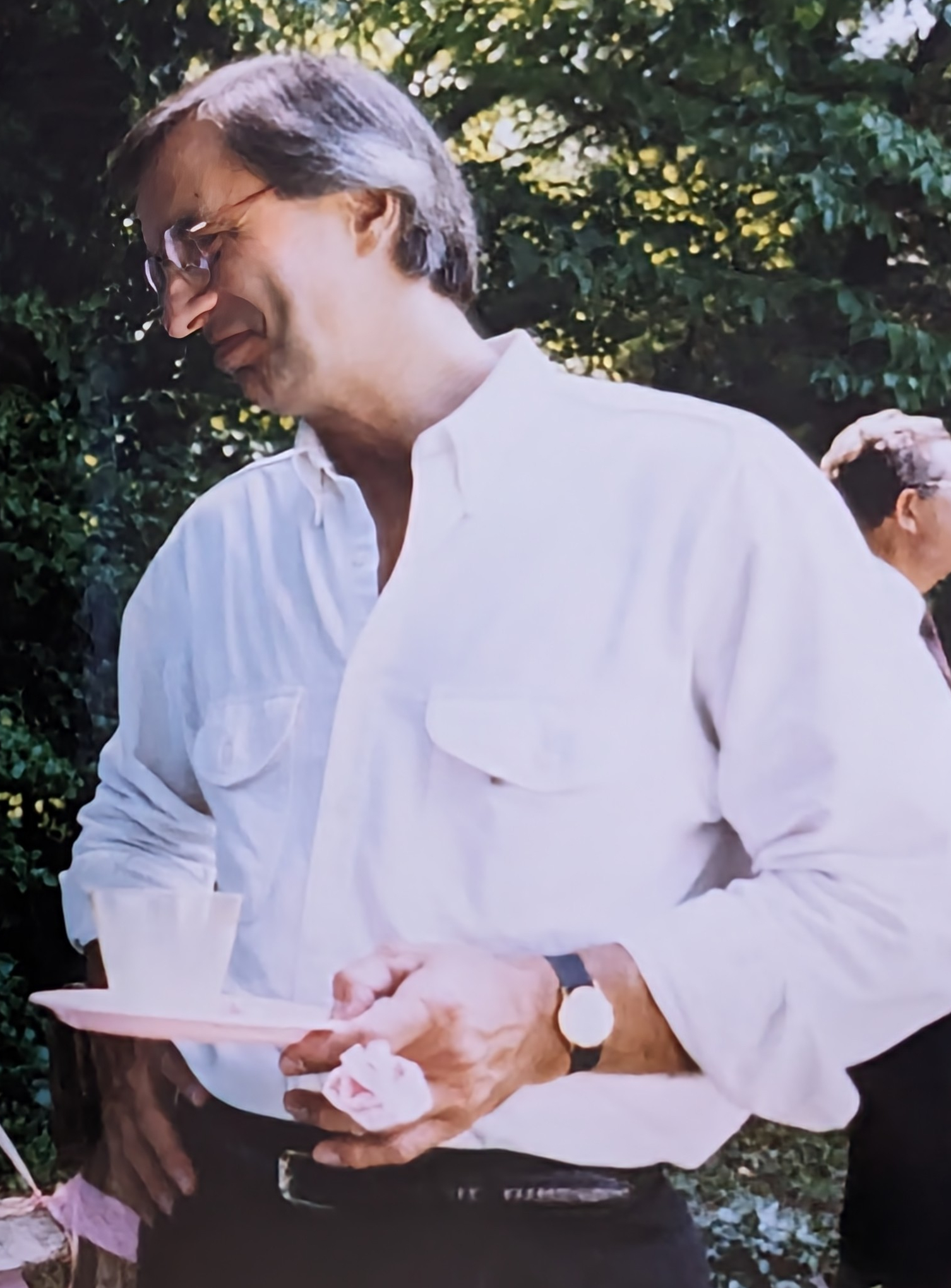
- Creech in 1992
- Born: James Edward Creech; October 21, 1944 (age 81); Goldsboro, North Carolina, U.S.
- Education: University of North Carolina at Chapel Hill (BA); Duke University (MDiv)
- Spouses: Merle Smith (m. 1967, divorced); Chris Weedy (m. 1992; died 2021)
- Religion: United Methodist Church
- Ordained: June 1970
- Laicized: November 17, 1999

James Edward Creech (born October 21, 1944) is an American gay rights activist and former minister in the United Methodist Church who was defrocked in 1999 for marrying same-sex couples.

== Background and defrocking ==
James Edward Creech was born to a Methodist family in Goldsboro, North Carolina, on October 21, 1944. He earned a bachelor's degree in biblical studies from the University of North Carolina at Chapel Hill, and graduated from Duke University in 1970 with a Masters of Divinity. He began his career serving Methodist congregations in North Carolina. In 1984, he became active in gay rights advocacy when a congregant came out to him, in response to the United Methodist Church formally banning "self-avowed practicing homosexuals" from becoming clergy.

Due to his activism, he was not reappointed pastor of his Raleigh, North Carolina, congregation in 1990. He subsequently worked for the North Carolina Council of Churches, a progressive organization, where he served as its liaison to the state legislature and focused on LGBTQ rights, the abolition of the death penalty, and worker's rights.

In 1996, he was appointed senior pastor of First United Methodist Church in Omaha, Nebraska, where he performed a commitment ceremony for a lesbian couple the following year. As such ceremonies were not allowed by the denomination, he was suspended and faced a defrocking trial, from which he was acquitted. He returned to North Carolina, where he performed another ceremony for a gay couple, leading to a second trial that ended with his defrocking. Creech denounced the second trial and did not enter a plea, performing a final ceremony the day before he was defrocked on November 17, 1999.

== Activism ==
Afterward, Creech became a founding member of the North Carolina Religious Coalition for Marriage Equality, an interfaith same-sex marriage advocacy group, co-author of the Dallas Principles, was a participant in the Marriage Equality Express, and became board chairman of the North Carolina Social Justice Project, a progressive policy and advocacy organization dedicated to eliminating inequality in North Carolina.

Creech appeared in A Union in Wait, a 2001 Sundance Channel documentary film about same-sex marriage. In 2007 Creech became the executive director of Faith In America, a non-profit organisation founded by Mitchell Gold, focused on educating people about religion-based bigotry.

Creech's memoir, Adam's Gift: A Memoir of a Pastor’s Calling to Defy the Church's Persecution of Lesbians and Gays was published by Duke University Press in 2011. He was interviewed on The State of Things on WUNC on April 11, 2011, to discuss his new book.

In 2024, the United Methodist Church ended its bans on same-sex marriages and LGBTQ clergy, and allowed pastors who were defrocked under those policies to apply for reinstatement. Creech told the Associated Press that he was pleased by the decisions but would not seek reinstatement, saying that "I am not nor cannot be in pastoral ministry at this time in my life".

== Personal life ==
In 1967, Creech married Merle Smith; they had one son and later divorced. In 1992, he married social worker and activist Chris Weedy, becoming a stepfather to her daughter. Weedy died from cancer in 2021.

As of 2016, Creech lives in Raleigh, North Carolina.
