= Carneros Creek (Napa River tributary) =

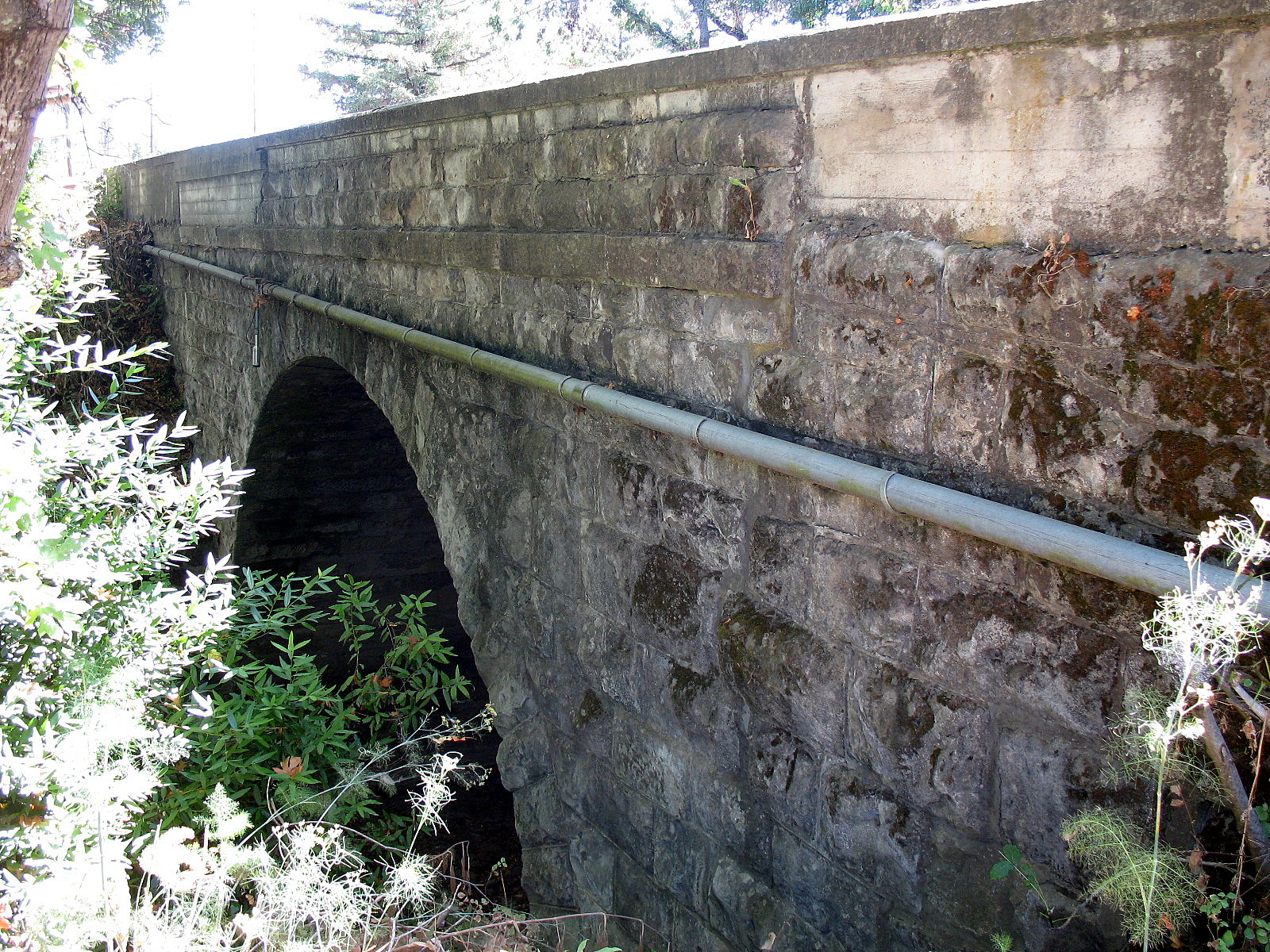
- Historic Old Sonoma Road bridge over Carneros Creek in 2010

- Location of the mouth of Carneros Creek in California
- Native name: Arroyo de los Carneros (Spanish)

Location
- Country: United States
- State: California
- Region: Napa County, California
- City: Napa

Physical characteristics
- Source: Mayacamas Mountains
  - coordinates: 38°1′58″N 122°24′42″W
  - elevation: 1,500 ft (460 m)
- Mouth: Napa River
  - coordinates: 38°13′17″N 122°18′43″W
  - elevation: 3 ft (0.91 m)
- Basin size: 170 sq mi (440 km^{2})

Carneros Creek (Spanish: Arroyo de los Carneros) is a south by southeastward flowing stream originating in the southernmost Mayacamas Mountains, in Napa County, California. It is the southernmost tributary to the Napa River, entering 2.5 miles (4.0 km) north of San Pablo Bay and 5 miles (8.0 km) south of the town of Napa.

== History ==
A Mexican land grant named Los Carneros, which is Spanish for "sheep", dates to 1836 (Rancho Rincon de los Carneros) in what is now Napa County. Rancho Rincon de los Carneros, extending northeast from Carneros Creek to the Napa River, was granted to Nicolas Higuera around this time. Higuera also received Rancho Entre Napa, contiguous to the north along the creek. Carneros Creek forms the northeast border of the 1841 Mexican land grant Rancho Huichica which includes most of the Carneros region and Huichica Creek which is west of and parallel to Carneros Creek. Rancho Huichica was granted to Jacob P. Leese the first American pioneer to build a house in San Francisco. In the next year, Antonio Ortega, the Administrator of Mission San Francisco Solano, was granted a large rancho from Napa to Yountville. This area, which extended to Carneros Creek, above Higuera's grant, was later granted to Salvador Vallejo.

== Watershed ==
The Carneros Creek official mainstem is 9.8 miles (15.8 km) long. This third order stream has a rectangular drainage basin area of 8.9 square miles (23 km^{2}). The highest elevation in the watershed is 1,660 feet (510 m) above mean sea level, dropping to sea level at its confluence with the Napa River. The lowest 1,640 feet (500 m) of the creek is confined within flood levees.

== Ecology ==
Carneros Creek is an anadromous steelhead trout (Oncorhynchus mykiss) stream. Because these trout spend two years in freshwater before returning to the sea, only the perennial middle reach of the creek hosts trout year-round (between Old Sonoma Road and extending upstream about 4.2 miles (6.8 km) where the channel goes dry in summer and fall).

== See also ==
- Napa River
- Los Carneros AVA
- Carneros, California
- List of watercourses in the San Francisco Bay Area
