= Equal marriage =

Equal marriage can refer to:

- Same-sex marriage, as one of many synonyms.
- Marriage counseling principle of the married couple having the kind of marriage that is a balanced partnership with equal respect, responsibilities, and power
- Feminism topic of legal and social equality of women in marriage, examples in Medieval India, First-wave feminism, Women's Strike, and Canadian rights
- The custom or legal requirement of Ebenbürtigkeit (marriage selection restricted by the principle of equality of birth) practiced by royalty in Europe and elsewhere; see royal intermarriage

== See also ==
- Marriage equality (disambiguation)
