= Nathan Coombs =

American politician (1826–1877)

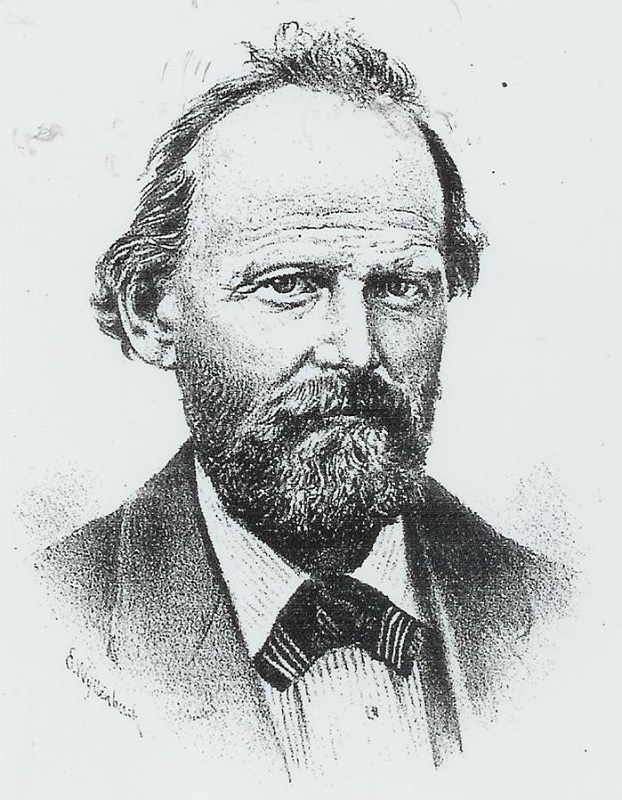

Member of the California State Assembly from the 10th district
- In office January 2, 1860 – January 7, 1861
- Preceded by: Multi-member district
- Succeeded by: Multi-member district
- In office January 1, 1855 – January 7, 1856
- Preceded by: Multi-member district
- Succeeded by: Multi-member district

Personal details
- Born: June 12, 1826 Middleborough, Massachusetts, U.S.
- Died: December 26, 1877 (age 51) Napa, California, U.S.
- Party: Democratic
- Spouse: Maria Isabel Gordon
- Children: 3, including Frank
- Relatives: John M. Coghlan (son-in-law)

Nathan Coombs (June 12, 1826 – December 26, 1877) was a California pioneer and Democratic politician who served in the California State Assembly and is best known for founding the city of Napa, California.

== Life ==
Nathan Coombs lived in Massachusetts and came overland to Oregon in 1842. Coombs came to California in 1843, first working for Steven Smith in Bodega Bay; and then for William Gordon at Rancho Quesesosi in Yolo County. In 1845 he married William Gordon's daughter Maria Isabel Gordon (1831–1890). Coombs came to Napa Valley in 1845 and purchased a small part of Rancho Tulucay on the east side of the Napa River from Juarez Cayetano. Coombs participated in the Bear Flag Revolt of 1846. In 1847 Coombs purchased a 325 acres (1.3 km^{2}) farm on Rancho Napa from Salvador Vallejo about one and a half miles north-west of present-day Napa, and where he resided until his death.

Coombs purchased 80 acres (0.3 km^{2}) of Rancho Entre Napa from Nicholas Higuera in 1847. On this land, he founded and laid out the city of Napa in 1848.

Coombs and William Gordon purchased Rancho Chimiles from the Berreyesa family in 1851. Coombs was a member for 10th District of the California State Assembly, 1855–56 and 1860–61. He died in Napa, December 26, 1877.

== Legacy ==
Coombsville is named for him. His son Frank Coombs was a United States representative from California.
