= Rancho Rio de Jesus Maria =

Mexican land grant in California

Coordinates: 38.730°N 121.730°W

Rancho Rio de Jesus Maria was a 26,637-acre (107.80 km^{2}) Mexican land grant in present-day Yolo County, California given in 1843 by Governor Manuel Micheltorena to Thomas M. Hardy. The name refers to Rio de Jesús María, now known as Cache Creek. The grant, north of Woodland, extended along Cache Creek, from Rancho Quesesosi on the east to the Sacramento River.

== History ==
Thomas M. Hardy, a native of England, arrived in VeraCruz, Mexico in 1825, and was in the service of Mexico at the Battle of San Jacinto in 1836. For his service, he was considered a naturalized citizen of Mexico. Hardy was in California as early as 1843 when he was granted the six square league Rancho Rio de Jesus Maria. He drowned, under strange circumstances, in Suisun Bay near Benicia in 1848. His estate was sold by a public administrator to James M. Harbin. Harbin came to California in 1846, and co-discovered Harbin Springs, California in 1852.

With the cession of California to the United States following the Mexican-American War, the 1848 Treaty of Guadalupe Hidalgo provided that the land grants would be honored. As required by the Land Act of 1851, a claim for Rancho Rio de Jesus Maria was filed with the Public Land Commission in 1852, and the grant was patented to James M. Harbin 1858.

In 1859, lawyers James Ben Ali Haggin (1822–1914) and Lloyd Tevis (1824–1899) foreclosed on Rancho Rio de Jesus Maria.

In 1865, a John Hardy from Canada, claimed that he was the son and heir of Thomas M. Hardy. This claim rejected by the US Supreme Court in 1874.
