= The New American Story =

Book by US Senator Bill Bradley

- Author: Bill Bradley
- Language: English
- Genre: Non-fiction
- Publisher: Random House
- Publication date: March 27, 2007
- Publication place: United States
- ISBN: 978-1-4000-6507-3
- OCLC: 76416547
- Dewey Decimal: 973.931 22
- LC Class: JK275 .B69 2007

The New American Story is a book written by former United States Senator and 2000 presidential hopeful, Bill Bradley, and first published on March 27, 2007. The book offers solutions to what it calls "the old American stories" about the economy, oil, entitlements, and party politics.

== Outline ==
In Section I, "The New American Story" Bradley discuss what he believes are the root assumptions that underlie longstanding social and economic problems in the United States.

Section II, "The New Agenda", provides analysis of the national agendas on the economy, oil and the environment, pensions, health care, and education, with possible solutions to each problem.

Section III, "The Political Landscape", looks at party politics. Bradley retells both the Republican and Democratic party histories to explain why he believes neither party can take effective actions to solve problems.

In Section IV, "Realizing the Dream", Bradley proposes a new "ethic of connectedness" that calls for more Americans to get involved with politics and activism. According to the book, no problem is too big to be solved by the collective action of engaged individuals.
