= Rancho Chimiles =

Mexican land grant in California

Coordinates: 38.390°N 122.150°W

Rancho Chimiles was a 17,762-acre (71.88 km^{2}) Mexican land grant in present day Napa County, California given in 1846 by Governor Pio Pico to José Ygnacio Berreyesa.

== History ==
José Ygnacio Marianio Berreyesa the son of José de los Reyes Berreyesa (1785–1846) was granted four square leagues in 1846. William Gordon, grantee of Rancho Quesesosi, and Nathan Coombs purchased Rancho Chimiles in 1851.

With the cession of California to the United States following the Mexican-American War, the 1848 Treaty of Guadalupe Hidalgo provided that the land grants would be honored. As required by the Land Act of 1851, a claim for Rancho Chimiles was filed with the Public Land Commission in 1852, and the grant was patented to William Gordon and Nathan Coombs in 1860.

== See also ==
- Ranchos of California
- List of Ranchos of California
