= Molly McKay =

American lawyer

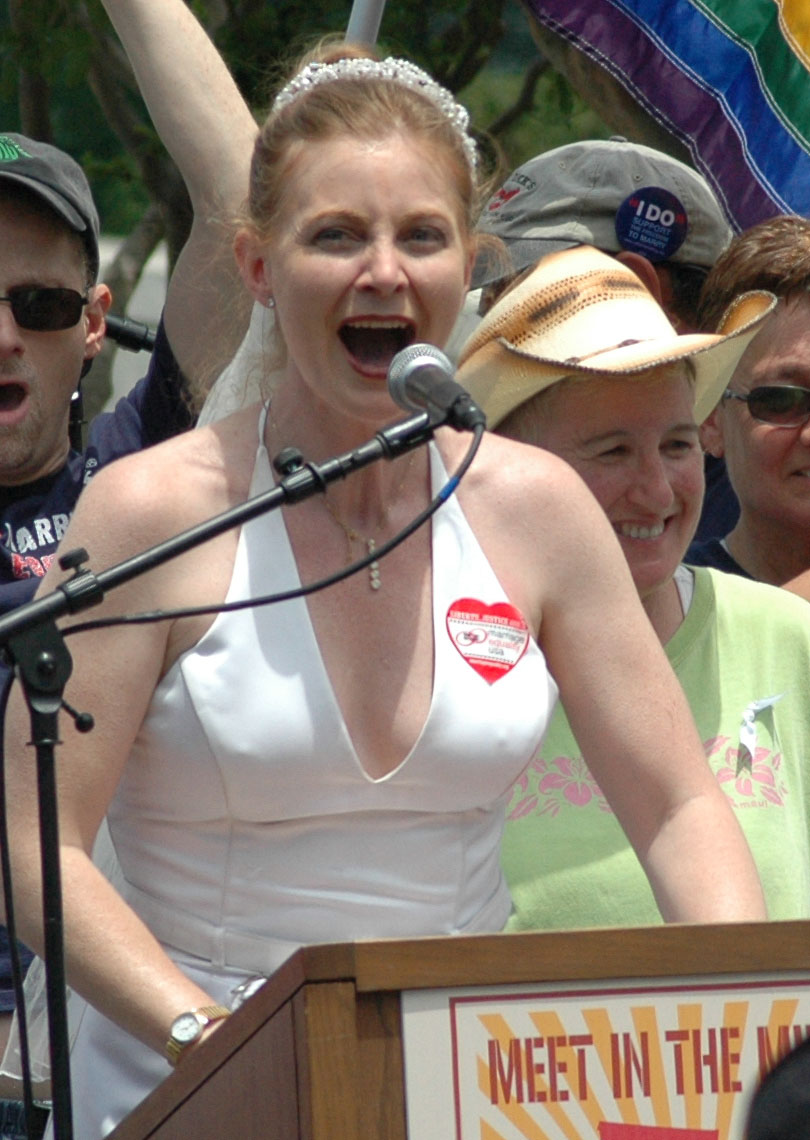
- McKay speaking at the Meet In The Middle Rally in Fresno, 2009
- Born: September 10, 1970 (age 55)
- Occupations: Lawyer, and Lesbian, Gay, Bisexual, and Transgender civil rights activist
- Title: Media Director for Marriage Equality USA
- Awards: Harvey Milk Democratic Club Community Service Award (2005), the Alice B. Toklas Community Service Award (2008), and GLOBE Community Service Award (2008)

Molly B. McKay (born September 9, 1970) is an American attorney and a civil rights activist for lesbian, gay, bisexual and transgender individuals. McKay was the former Co-Executive Director of Marriage Equality California and the former Media Director for Marriage Equality USA. She has also been active in Californians for Same Sex Marriage and the California Freedom to Marry Coalition, and was the Associate Executive Director of Equality California. McKay married her longtime partner Davina Kotulski in 2004 when Gavin Newsom made same sex marriage legal for one day in San Francisco.

== LGBT activism ==
Beginning in February 2001, McKay and her ex-wife, Davina Kotulski, began going to city halls in the Bay Area asking for marriage licenses and organizing annual "Marriage License Counter" protests to draw attention to the hundreds of rights same-sex couples are denied. In the United States, marriage licenses are commonly issued at the local city hall, or office of government for the municipality, with a city employee on one side of a counter, and the applicant on the other side. In response to having her San Francisco Marriage License invalidated, McKay joined her ex-wife Kotulski in organizing the "Marriage Equality Express", an educational bus tour across the United States that culminated in the first national same-sex marriage rally in Washington, DC, on October 11, 2004. Time and Parade magazines included the rally when citing the importance of same-sex marriage activism as one of the top ten issues of 2004. Molly McKay co-founded Marriage Equality California in 2004, along with several other activists, and continues to work with Marriage Equality USA.

When Marriage Equality California merged with Equality California in 2004, McKay led the Marriage Equality Project for the joint organization becoming Equality California's Field Director. McKay eventually left the organization in 2006 to rejoin Marriage Equality California's prior parent organization Marriage Equality USA.

=== Legal marriage and separation ===
McKay and her ex-wife, Kotulski, were the 17th same-sex couple married in San Francisco in 2004 and have appeared together on CNN, Newsweek, Time and USA Today. They are featured in three documentaries, the 2005 Carmen Goodyear- and Laurie York-directed Freedom to Marry (shown in seven countries and featured on PBS), the Geoff Callan and Mike Shaw 2007 release, Pursuit of Equality, and I Will, I Do, We Did following the San Francisco marriages that took place in 2004. They have also appeared on several television shows including American Quest, documenting the National "Marriage Equality Express", and a Queer Nation TV special in New Zealand.

In June 2011 McKay announced that she and Kotulski had separated, ending their 15-year relationship.

== Leadership awards ==
In 2003, McKay and her ex-wife received the "Defenders of Love" Award from the East Bay Pride Committee, and in 2004, she received the "Saints Alive" award from the San Francisco Metropolitan Community Church and was "sainted" by the Sisters of Perpetual Indulgence for her activism and advocacy for same-sex marriage. In 2006, Kotulski and McKay received the Michael "Switzer Leadership Award" from New Leaf Counseling Center in San Francisco.

Molly McKay has been recognized for her individual contributions as well. She received the Harvey Milk Democratic Club Community Service Award (2005), the Alice B. Toklas Community Service Award (2008), and GLOBE Community Service Award (2008).

== Marriage Equality Caravan ==
San Francisco Chronicle articles on Marriage Equality Caravan:

- October 5, 2004 "Taking gay marriage on the road Same-sex couples, supporters embark on bus trip across country" Marriage Equality Caravan
- October 6, 2004 "Battle over Same-Sex Marriage" Marriage Equality Caravan
- October 7, 2004 "A Grim Anniversary" Marriage Equality Caravan
- October 8, 2004 "Tension Grips Caravan" Marriage Equality Caravan
- October 9, 2004 "Freedom Riders Loaded with Tech" Marriage Equality Caravan
- October 10, 2004 "Marriage rights caravan gets lots of 'no thanks' from gays along road." Marriage Equality Caravan
- October 11, 2004 "Canvassing the nation for gay marriage rights Activists visit home towns en route to D.C. rally today" Marriage Equality Caravan
- October 12, 2004 "Marriage equality caravan joins spirited rally in D.C.Tired but happy, couples renew vows"

Marriage Equality Caravan and Marriage Equality DC Rally
