= Walters Ranch Hop Kiln =

Historical place in Sonoma County, United States

- Walters Ranch Hop Kiln Landmark Hop Kiln Winery
- U.S. National Register of Historic Places
- California Historical Landmark
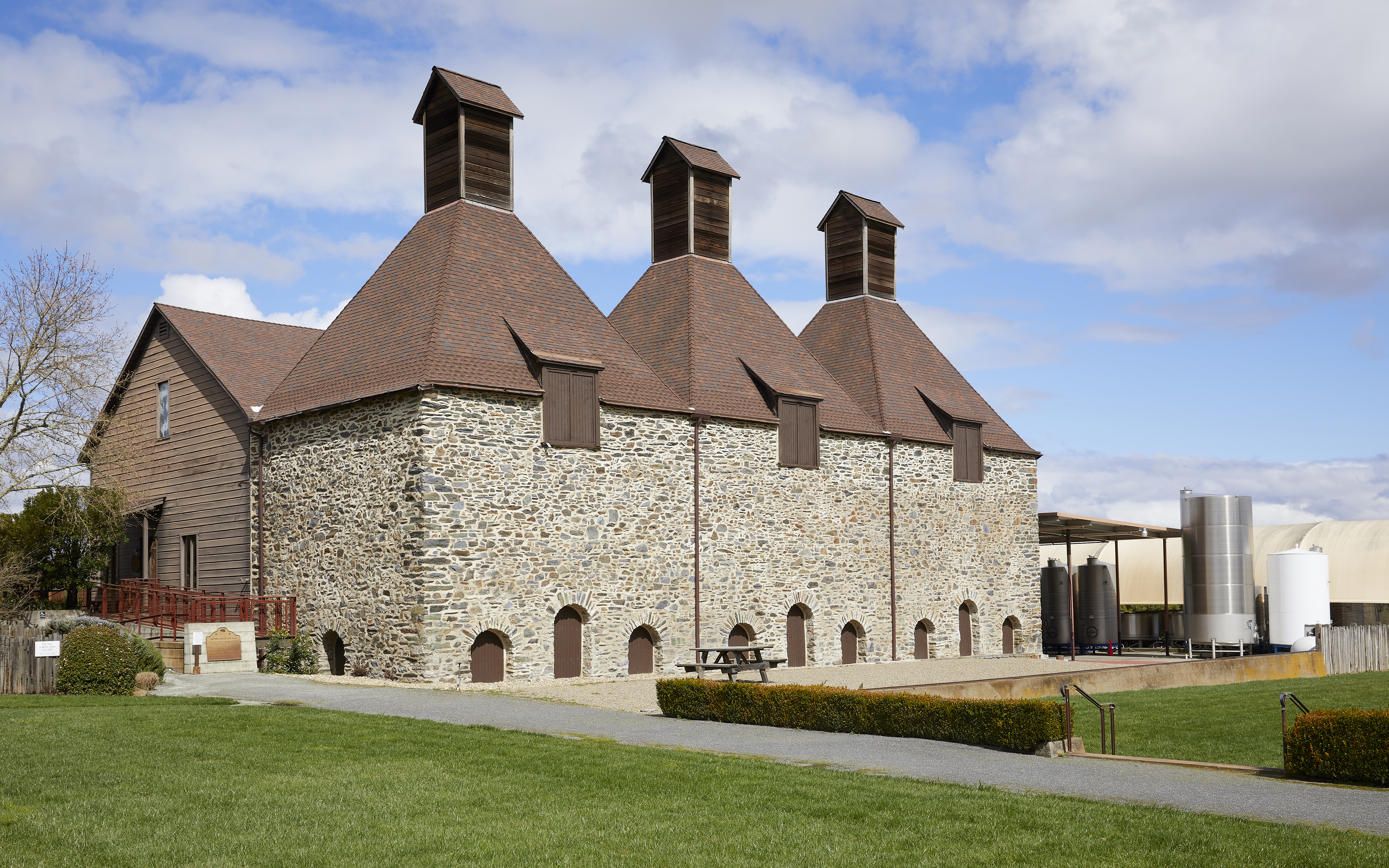
- Walters Ranch Hop Kiln

- Location within California Location within the United States
- Location: 6050 Westside Road, Healdsburg, California
- Coordinates: 38.53634°N 122.86774°W
- Built: 1905, 168 years ago
- NRHP reference No.: 77000351
- CHISL No.: 893

Significant dates
- Added to NRHP: October 7, 1977
- Designated CHISL: January 13, 1958

Walters Ranch Hop Kiln is a historical site of buildings, built in 1905, in Sonoma, California, United States. The Walters Ranch Hop Kiln is a California Historical Landmark No. 627 listed on January 13, 1958. The Walters Ranch Hop Kiln was built by Italian stonemason, Angelo "'Skinny" Soldini. Sol Walters purchased 380 acres of the Rancho Sotoyome, a 1853 Mexican land grant to Josefa Fitch. The Walters Ranch Hop Kiln is composed of three stone kilns (ovens, Oast houses) for drying hops for 20 hours a patch. Hops are used in beer making breweries. In addition to the kilns, the site has a wooden building for cooling the hops and a two-story press for baling the hops for shipment. The Walters Ranch Hop Kilns was one of early and large operation in the Northern California region.

Landmark Vineyards purchased the property in 2016. The company's Landmark Hop Kiln Winery is restoring the buildings that are in the Russian River Valley. It was hops, not grapes that was Sonoma County's first major crop. By 1940 hops was no longer a major crop due to the downy mildew disease and insect phylloxera.

There are other historical buildings on the site, A 1888 sheep barn was built with square nails and wood peg construction. Also a Italianate house.

A California historical marker is at 6050 Westside Road, Healdsburg. The historical marker at Walters Ranch Hop Kiln was placed there by the California Department of Parks and Recreation in working with the Griffin Vineyard on May 1, 1977.

Walters Ranch Hop Kiln is on the National Register of Historic Places in Sonoma County, California.

== See also ==
- California Historical Landmarks in Sonoma County
