= Barbra Casbar Siperstein =

American political and transgender-rights activist

- Born: November 30, 1942; Jersey City, New Jersey, U.S.
- Died: February 3, 2019 (aged 76); New Brunswick, New Jersey, U.S.
- Education: Rutgers University; Pace University
- Occupations: Political and transgender rights activist
- Known for: first openly transgender member of the Democratic National Committee
- Notable work: helped write the Dallas Principles Responsible for the Babs Siperstein Law in NJ 2019
- Spouse: Carol (Slonk) Siperstein
- Partner: Dorothy Crouch
- Children: Jana Siperstein-Szucs; Jeffrey Siperstein; Jared Siperstein
- Parent(s): Morris and Mildred (Yanover) Siperstein

Barbra Casbar Siperstein (November 20, 1942 – February 3, 2019), commonly known as Babs Siperstein, was an American political and transgender-rights activist. She came out as a trans woman in the late 1980s. When her wife died in 2001 she channeled the grief into activism. She served in numerous Democratic Party political organizations including the New Jersey Stonewall Democrats, Garden State Equality and the Democratic National Committee Eastern Caucus. She advocated for gender inclusion in discrimination and hate crime laws in New Jersey. In 2009 she became the only openly transgender member of the Democratic National Committee serving in various roles until 2017.

== Biography ==
Siperstein was born November 20, 1942 to Morris and Mildred (Yanover) Siperstein and grew up in Jersey City, New Jersey.

She attended Rutgers University, where she earned a bachelor's degree, and then earned a master's of business administration in public accounting from Pace University. After college, Siperstein joined the family business, Siperstein Fords Paint Corporation, in Fords, New Jersey, where she met her wife, Carol Slonk, when Slonk joined the company as an administrative assistant. The couple had three children: a daughter, Jana Siperstein-Szucs; and two sons, Jeffrey and Jared Siperstein.

Barbra Siperstein knew from early childhood that she was different, but did not fully recognize she was transgender until middle age. Siperstein told her wife that she was transgender in the late 1980s. For most of her life Siperstein denied to herself that she was transgender, until she eventually came out to her wife who was very supportive. They created Casbar as a combination of Carol's initials and Barbra's name. Carol encouraged her to be openly outwardly female, and Barbra began to transition in small steps. Barbra was openly transgender with her family, but did not come out publicly until around 2000, when she began her activism in earnest. She was outed by a local newspaper, and continued to transition in strides.

Carol died in 2001. Barbra has said that she channeled her grief about her wife's death into her activist work. Eight years after Carol's death, Barbra changed her Hebrew name officially to a female name after a teshuva on the status of transgender people in the Jewish faith allowed her to do so. Siperstein started her activism fully after her daughter took over her family business.

== Career and activism ==
Prior to transitioning, Siperstein served in the Army and was a small-business owner. Siperstein advocated for marriage equality, workplace discrimination reforms, and amendments to discrimination laws in order to better protect transgender people. She also advocated for making gender equality an important part of any political LGBT agenda. She was one of 24 authors that helped write the Dallas Principles in 2009.

Siperstein was President and a board member of the New Jersey Stonewall Democrats until its closure in 2013. She was also Vice President of Garden State Equality and Vice Chair of the Democratic National Committee Eastern Caucus. Through those organizations, she advocated for gender inclusion in discrimination and hate crime laws in New Jersey. She was also appointed to the New Jersey Civil Union Review Commission. Siperstein had served as Deputy Vice Chair of the New Jersey Democratic State Committee. She was also Political Director of the Gender Rights Advocacy Association of New Jersey.

In 2009, Siperstein became the first openly transgender member of the DNC, where she was appointed by then-chairman Tim Kaine. She was appointed to the Democratic National Committee's Executive Committee in 2011, where she served until October 2017, when she and several other DNC officials were demoted or removed. In the 2016 Democratic National Convention, Siperstein was a superdelegate for Hillary Clinton. As of 2016, she was one of 28 openly transgender delegates to the Democratic National Convention in Philadelphia.

Siperstein contributed to the Huffington Post.

== Death and tributes ==
Siperstein died of cancer on February 3, 2019, in New Brunswick, New Jersey at age 76. New Jersey Governor Phil Murphy ordered that flags be lowered to half staff in honor of her death.

In June 2019, Siperstein was one of the inaugural fifty American “pioneers, trailblazers, and heroes” inducted on the National LGBTQ Wall of Honor within the Stonewall National Monument (SNM) in New York City’s Stonewall Inn. The SNM is the first U.S. national monument dedicated to LGBTQ rights and history, and the wall’s unveiling was timed to take place during the 50th anniversary of the Stonewall riots.

== See also ==
- List of transgender public officeholders in the United States
