= Dallas Principles =

The Dallas Principles is a set of eight guiding principles to achieve full LGBT equality. The principles are:

1. Full civil rights for lesbian, gay, bisexual and transgender individuals must be enacted now. Delay and excuses are no longer acceptable.
2. We will not leave any part of our community behind.
3. Separate is never equal.
4. Religious beliefs are not a basis upon which to affirm or deny civil rights.
5. The establishment and guardianship of full civil rights is a non-partisan issue.
6. Individual involvement and grassroots action are paramount to success and must be encouraged.
7. Success is measured by the civil rights we all achieve, not by words, access or money raised.
8. Those who seek our support are expected to commit to these principles.

The principles were drafted May 15–17, 2009, in Dallas, Texas, by 24 LGBT rights advocates who were frustrated with the Obama administration's pace of fulfilling its campaign promises to the LGBT community.

The authors of the Dallas Principles are Juan Ahonen-Jover, Ken Ahonen-Jover, John Bare, Jarrett Barrios, Dana Beyer, Jeffrey H. Campagna, Mandy Carter, Michael Coe, Jimmy Creech, Allison Duncan, Michael E. Guest, Joanne Herman, Donald Hitchcock, Lane Hudson, Charles Merrill, Dixon Osburn, Lisa Polyak, Barbra Casbar Siperstein, Pam Spaulding, Andy Szekeres, Lisa Turner, Jon Winkleman, and Paul Yandura.

== See also ==
- LGBT rights in the United States
