= Rancho Sotoyome =

Former Mexican land grant in Alta California

Coordinates: 38.62°N 122.84°W

Rancho Sotoyome was a 48,837-acre (197.64 km^{2}) Mexican land grant given to Henry D. Fitch. Sotoyome or "Satiyomes" was the name of a Wappo tribe. The grant, in present-day Sonoma County, California, extended along the Russian River encompassing the Alexander Valley and present-day Healdsburg.

== History ==
San Diego sea captain Henry Delano Fitch had married Josefa Carrillo, which made him the brother-in-law of General Mariano Guadalupe Vallejo (who was married to Josefa's sister Francisca Benicia Carrillo). General Vallejo was a critical factor in obtaining the Rancho Sotoyome grant.

Fitch hired Cyrus Alexander as ranch manager under a four-year agreement, after which Alexander was to receive two square leagues of land and part of the ranch stock. Fitch petitioned for his grant in 1840, and was officially granted the eight square leagues (approximately 35,000 acres (142 km^{2})) by Governor Juan Alvarado in 1841. In 1844, Fitch received a three square league addition from Governor Manuel Micheltorena.

After Alexander's contract ended in 1845, Mose Carson, brother of Kit Carson, took over as manager of Rancho Sotoyome. Alexander settled on his tract in what is now Alexander Valley.

Captain Fitch continued trading up and down the coast, with Rancho Sotoyome as one of the many business enterprises directed from his San Diego base. After the discovery of gold, Fitch planned to move his family north to Rancho Sotoyome, but had not done so before he died in 1849. Following his death, his widow Josefa and their children moved to Rancho Sotoyome. Their third son, Guillermo (William) married Clara Piña, whose relatives owned the adjacent Rancho Tzabaco.

With the cession of California to the United States following the Mexican-American War, the 1848 Treaty of Guadalupe Hidalgo provided that the land grants would be honored. As required by the Land Act of 1851, a claim for Rancho Sotoyome was filed with the Public Land Commission in 1852, and the grant was patented to Josefa Carrillo de Fitch in 1858. Alexander filed a claim in 1853 for his two square leagues (part of the 1841 grant by Governor Alvarado to Fitch), but it was rejected by the Land Commission.

In 1856, Josefa Carrillo de Fitch auctioned part of the Rancho to pay taxes. Harmon Heald, an Ohio businessman who had been squatting on Rancho Sotoyome since 1850, purchased 100 acres (0.40 km^{2}). Heald's small town of Healdsburg was incorporated in 1867.

== See also ==
- California Historical Landmarks in Sonoma County
- Walters Ranch Hop Kiln
