= Henry D. Fitch =

Sea captain and trader (1799–1849)

Henry Delano Fitch
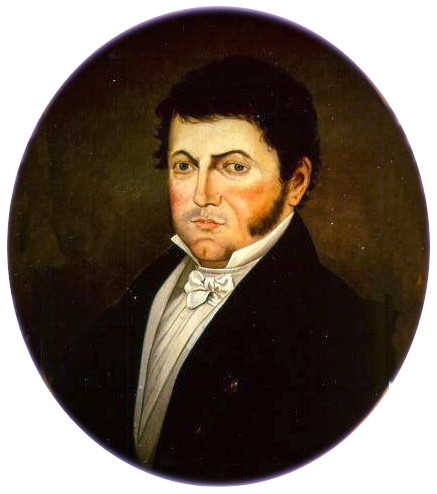
- Born: May 7, 1799; New Bedford, Massachusetts
- Died: 13 January 1849 (aged 49); San Diego, California
- Resting place: Presidio of San Diego
- Citizenship: Mexico, United States
- Occupations: Merchant, politician
- Spouse: Josefa Carrillo (1829–1849)
- Children: 11

Henry Delano Fitch (1799 – 1849), later known by his Spanish name Don Enrique Domingo Fitch, was a Californian trader, ranchero, and politician. Born in Massachusetts, Fitch became a merchant sailor in South America in 1815, before eventually emigrating to Alta California (then a part of Mexico). In California, he became a Mexican citizen and married into the prominent Carrillo family of California, giving Fitch the opportunities to acquire rancho grants and to serve in public office as Alcalde of San Diego (mayor).

== Early life ==
Henry Fitch was born in 1799 in Nantucket or New Bedford, Massachusetts. His parents were Beriah Fitch and Sarah Delano. Beriah Fitch was a sea captain. In 1815, Fitch made his first ship journey, visiting ports in South America, buying and selling cargoes for a Danish merchant.

== Career and family life in California ==
Fitch first came to California while serving as a sea captain, from 1826 until 1830, of the María Ester, a Mexican brig that called ports throughout California. It was during his journey on the María Ester that he met Josefa Carrillo in San Diego. She was fifteen years old. Fitch expressed romantic interest in Carrillo, and during his return visits to San Diego he would court the girl. In 1827, Fitch asked Carrillo's parents for her hand in marriage.

On April 14, 1829, he was baptized in San Diego, California under the name Enrique Domingo Fitch. The next day, Fitch was to marry Carrillo. Prior to the wedding, Domingo Carrillo, Carrillo's uncle, stopped the wedding on behalf of then governor Jose Maria Echeandia. Later in her life, Carrillo claimed that the Echeandia intended to stop the wedding because he was in love with her, however, historians believe Echeandia stopped the wedding because of his general dislike of Fitch.

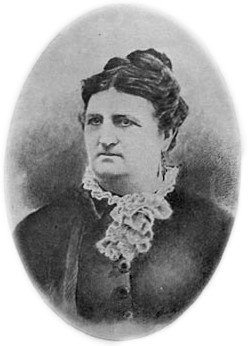
Josefa Carrillo Fitch

That evening, Carrillo's cousin, Pio Pico brought her to a ship called the Vulture. The ship left for Valparaiso, Chile, where the two eloped on July 3, 1829. The newlyweds returned to San Diego in July 1830, with a newborn son, Enrique Eduardo. The family would sail up the coast to Santa Cruz on a trade mission. Upon stopping in San Pedro, they received a summons from padre Jose Sanchez claiming that the marriage certificate from Chile was invalid. Fitch ignored the summons and was arrested on August 29, 1830. He was held in San Pedro by General Mariano G. Vallejo, who would eventually marry Carrillo's sister, and therefore become Fitch's brother-in-law. On December 28, an ecclesiastical tribunal ruled that the marriage was legal.

== Return to San Diego ==
For one year, 1830–31, Fitch was captain of the Leonor which transported Mexican convicts. He became a naturalized Mexican citizen in 1833. In Old Town, San Diego, Fitch operated a general store starting in 1833. At his store, he traded tallow, furs, and hides, outfitted hunters, and went on trading voyages on the coast.

In 1835, Fitch became San Diego's first city attorney. Fitch was not fluent in Spanish, therefore he struggled to succeed at the job. He was released from the position in 1836 and in 1837 he was asked to serve as police commissioner. In January 1840, he served as justice of the peace. In 1846, he became alcade of San Diego. Within a year he quit. Historical records note that he did not enjoy public service and repeatedly requested to be relieved of his duties based on language barriers.

During his time in public service, his general store and trade business continued to thrive. He struggled to get repaid by debtors, the most notable debtor being John Sutter.

Ten years later, in 1845, he made the first land survey and map of the pueblo land surrounding San Diego.

== Land acquisitions and later career ==
Fitch became disenchanted with the trade business, including challenging business relations. He expressed interest in new land settlement opportunities north of San Francisco. In 1841, he was given a 48,000-acre land grant at Rancho Sotoyome in Healdsburg, California in Sonoma County. Fitch never actively settled or developed the land in Healdsburg, choosing to continue to work in the trade industry up and down the coast. After gold was found in Northern California, Fitch started planning to relocate the family to Rancho Sotoyome in March 1849. However, Fitch would die before he relocated.

== Later life ==
Fitch died of pneumonia in San Diego in 1849. His body was buried at Presidio of San Diego. His body was the last buried at the site. After his death, his family relocated to Healdsburg.

== Legacy ==
Fitch Mountain in Healdsburg is named after Fitch.

== See also ==
- History of marriage in California
- Josefa Carrillo

== Research resources ==
- Guide to the Fitch Family Papers at The Bancroft Library
- Biography from Smythe's History of San Diego, p. 280-284 (San Diego Historical Society).
- "Captain Henry Fitch, San Diego Merchant, 1825-1849", The Journal of San Diego History 27:4 (1981) by Adele Ogden
- "A California Romance in Perspective: the elopement, marriage and ecclesiastical trial of Henry D. Fitch and Josefa Carrillo", The Journal of San Diego History 19:2 (1973) by Ronald L. Miller
