= Coombsville =

Agricultural area in California, US

Coombsville is an agricultural area and location of the Coombsville AVA, and American Viticultural Area (AVA) located at the southeastern end of the Napa Valley's grape-growing appellation.

Since the middle of the 20th century, it has gained recognition for its suitability for the slow-ripening Bordeaux varietals such as cabernet sauvignon.

== Terrain and climate ==
A geographic area shaped like a “cup and saucer”, Coombsville is characterized by gently hilly terrain formed millions of year ago by shifting masses of earth.

The Coombsville AVA is a sub-AVA of the Napa Valley AVA, approved in December 2011. Coombsville is distinguished from other parts of the Napa Valley by its slightly cooler climate and soil conditions, which are a mix of well-draining river rock and mineral-rich volcanic ash. The rolling terrain provides various aspects that lend to optimization of many varietals, though Cabernet Sauvignon dominates the abundant hillside vineyards.

== History to present ==
The area takes its name from Nathan Coombs, who purchased the land from Nicholas Higuera's Rancho Entre Napa, an 1836 Mexican land grant. It was at this parcel that Coombs created the city of Napa in 1847.

Located east of Napa, Coombsville’s agricultural orientation was initially focused on livestock and subsistence farming as opposed to vineyard development. It was only in the mid-20th century that the region began to attract attention from grape growers and vintners.

== See also ==
- Coombsville AVA
- Napa Valley topics
