= Raydiance Inc. =

Raydiance Inc., headquartered in Petaluma, California, was the maker of the world's first software-controlled ultrashort pulse (USP) laser. The company was established in 2003 by Jeff Bullington and Peter Delfyett in Orlando, Florida as Ablation Industries, Inc. In 2004, Ablation Industries changed its corporate name to Raydiance, Inc. and recruited Barry Schuler, former CEO of America Online (AOL), as its new CEO and chairman of the board. Raydiance, Inc. commercialized a fiber-based USP technology first developed in the laboratories at the University of Central Florida's College of Optics. This effort was funded by the Defense Advanced Research Projects Agency. Raydiance introduced its first product, a desktop-sized picosecond pulse laser, in 2007. Ultrashort pulse lasers, which generate pulses in the picosecond to femtosecond range, are being used for applications in the life sciences, micromachining, imaging and diagnostics, and defense sectors. The company ceased operations in July 2015. The assets of Raydiance Inc were acquired by Coherent Inc in August 2015.
