= Sylvia Rhue =

American film director

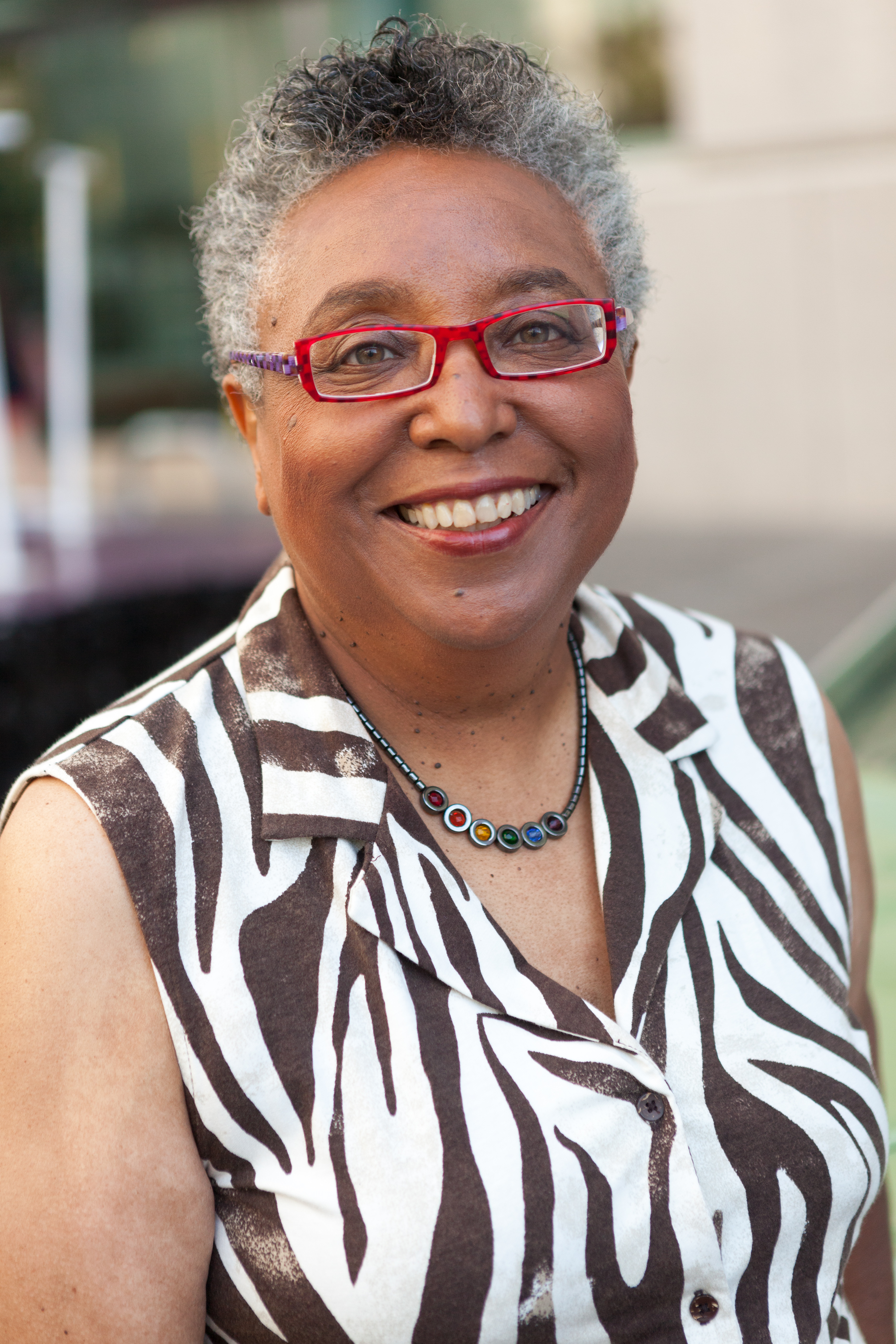
- Rhue at San Francisco Pride in 2011
- Born: 1947 (age 78–79); Pasadena, California
- Education: Oakwood College; UCLA (MSW, 1971); Institute for the Advanced Study of Human Sexuality (PhD, 1986)
- Occupation: Writer Filmmaker Producer
- Notable work: All God's Children

Sylvia Rhue (born 1947) is an African-American writer, filmmaker, producer, and LGBT activist.

== Early life and education ==
Rhue was born in Pasadena, California in 1947. Her parents, a railroad worker and a secretary, were Canadian immigrants. Rhue's maternal great-great-grandmother, a slave, was born in Blair House, the President's Guest House. Rhue grew up attending a traditional black church.

Rhue came out as a lesbian in the early 1970s. She had little support at that time, other than one book, Lesbian/Woman.

Rhue earned a degree in Psychology/Sociology from Oakwood College (now University), and a Master of Social Work from UCLA. In 1986, Rhue graduated from the Institute for the Advanced Study of Human Sexuality, becoming the first African American to receive a Ph.D. in Human Sexuality.

== Career ==
Rhue found employment as a psychiatric social worker and as a sex therapist, working specifically with the African American community. In 1988, Rhue helped found the Black Gay and Lesbian Leadership Forum.

In 1996, Rhue co-produced and co-directed (with Oscar-nominated directors Frances Reid and Dee Mosbacher) the documentary All God's Children, which dealt with African American family and religious values, civil rights, and homophobia. The film won several awards, including Best Documentary at the National Black Arts Film Festival, and a Lambda Liberty Award from the Lambda Legal Defense and Education Fund. Other films produced by Rhue include Women in Love, "We Have a Legacy, and Women and Children: AIDS and HIV.

Rhue served with the National Black Justice Coalition from its founding in 2003, as a board member and a director. She spoke out against condemnation of the LGBT community by the religious right, once stating, "Love is the engine of the universe and cannot be boiled down to tab A goes into Slot B." In 2006, she helped organize the Black Church Summit in Atlanta, to promote acceptance of gays and lesbians in black churches.

Rhue has also worked for the Religious Coalition for Reproductive Rights and as Director of Equal Partners in Faith. She has contributed articles to The Huffington Post and other publications.

== Publications ==
- Vickie M. Mays, PhD; Susan D. Cochran, PhD; Sylvia Rhue, PhD (1993). "The Impact of Perceived Discriminitation on the Intimate Relationships of Black Lesbians". Journal of Homosexuality. 25 (4): 1–14. doi:10.1300/J082v25n04_01. PMC 6225772. PMID 8106735.
- James Thomas Sears; Walter L. Williams (1997). Overcoming Heterosexism and Homophobia: Strategies that Work. Columbia University Press. pp. 117–130. ISBN 9780231104227. Chapter: Reducing Homophobia in African American Communities
- Wendy Reed; Jennifer Home (2006). All Out of Faith: Southern Women on Spirituality. The University of Alabama Press. ISBN 9780817315344.

== Filmography ==
| Year | Title | Role | Notes |
|---|---|---|---|
| 1994 | Coming Out Under Fire | Archival film source | Documentary |
| 1996 | All God's Children | Director | Documentary |
| 2002 | Family Fundamentals | Consultant | Documentary |
| 2005 | The L Word | Actress | TV series |
