= Rancho Entre Napa =

Mexican land grant in California

Coordinates: 38.250°N 122.300°W

Rancho Entre Napa was a 7,000-acre (28 km^{2}) Mexican land grant in present-day Napa County, California given in 1836 by Governor Mariano Chico to Nicholas Higuera. The grant extended along the west bank of the Napa River from present-day Napa south to Carneros Creek.

== History ==
Nicholas Higuera was a soldier in San Francisco from 1819–1823, and alcalde at Sonoma. Higuera married Marta Frias. Higuera was granted the one square league Rancho Entre Napa, and the 2,588-acre (10.47 km^{2}) Rancho Rincon de los Carneros.

Unlike most Mexican land grants in California that remained intact at the end of the Mexican era, Rancho Entre Napa was subdivided. Higuera subdivided and sold much of the land in 1847, retaining 877 acres (3.5 km^{2}) for himself. With the cession of California to the United States following the Mexican-American War, the 1848 Treaty of Guadalupe Hidalgo provided that the land grants would be honored. As required by the Land Act of 1851, 16 claims were filed with the Public Land Commission in 1852 for 14 tracts (Land Cases 80 ND, 108 ND, 113 ND, 152 ND, 160 ND, 171 ND, 172 ND, 176 ND, 177 ND, 231 ND, 242 ND, 244 ND, 260 ND, and 365 ND) of Rancho Entre Napa and 2 tracts (Land Cases 282 ND and 296 ND) of Rancho Rincon de los Carneros.

Nathan Coombs (1826–1877) arrived in the Napa Valley in 1845, and bought a small piece of Rancho Tulucay on the east side of the Napa River from Juarez Cayetano. Coombs purchased 325 acres (1.3 km^{2}) of Rancho Napa on the east side of the Napa River from Salvador Vallejo in 1847. Coombs purchased 80 acres (0.3 km^{2}) of Rancho Entre Napa from Nicholas Higuera in 1847, and founded and laid out the town of Napa on Rancho Entre Napa in 1848.

== See also ==
- Ranchos of Napa County, California
- List of Ranchos of California
