= Marriage Equality USA =

- Founded: 1998
- Founder: Connie Ress, Jesus Lebron, L.J. Carusone, Michael Thurber, Jim DeLaHunt, Molly McKay, Davina Kotulski
- Type: 501(c)(3)
- Purpose: LGBT rights
- Location: New York, NY, USA
- Region served: USA
- Method: Education, advocacy, grassroots organizing, partnerships and action
- Executive Director: Brian Silva
- Website: www.marriageequality.org

Marriage Equality USA was an organization working for the legal recognition of same-sex marriage in the United States. The group worked by doing public education and outreach, media campaigns and holding visibility events. Marriage Equality, Inc. was founded in 1998.

== Engaged Tour ==
In the months after the passing of Proposition 8, Marriage Equality USA sponsored a statewide poll to determine opinions on same sex marriage. Polling data was presented in over forty cities in a town hall forum dubbed the "Get Engaged Tour". At the events participants were presented the results of the statewide polling data, as well as an opportunity to discuss next steps in moving forward with an effort to bring about marriage equality.

== See also ==
- LGBT rights in the United States
- List of LGBT rights organizations
- Same-sex marriage in the United States
