= Why You Should Give a Damn About Gay Marriage =

2004 book by Davina Kotulski

- Cover of the first edition
- Author: Davina Kotulski
- Language: English
- Subject: Same-sex marriage
- Publisher: Advocate Books
- Publication date: 2004
- Publication place: United States
- Media type: Print
- Pages: 202
- ISBN: 1555838731
- LC Class: HQ1034.U5 K67 2004

Why You Should Give a Damn About Gay Marriage is a 2004 book by Davina Kotulski in which the author advocates the legal recognition of same-sex marriage. It received generally positive reviews in the LGBT press.

== Summary ==
Kotulski states that heterosexual couples who marry in the United States gain at least 1,049 federal rights, all of which are denied to same-sex couples who cannot legally marry. She rejects alternatives to marriage such as domestic partnership and civil union, describing these as inferior options for gay people.

== Background and publication history ==
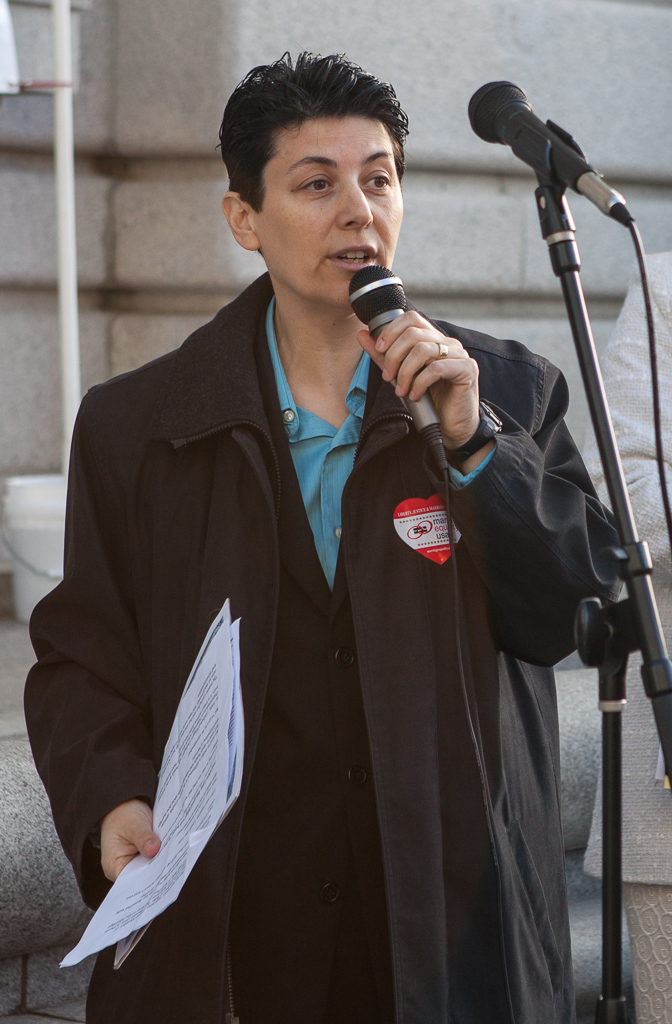
Kotulski in 2010

Davina Kotulski is a clinical psychologist and LGBT rights activist. Why You Should Give a Damn About Gay Marriage was her first book; according to Kotulski, she wrote it in four and a half months. The book was first published in April 2004 by Advocate Books, an imprint of Alyson Publications.

Kotulski and McKay received the "Defenders of Love" Award from the East Bay Pride Committee, and in 2004, she received the "Saints Alive" award from the San Francisco Metropolitan Community Church and was "sainted" by the Sisters of Perpetual Indulgence for her activism and advocacy for same-sex marriage. In 2006, Kotulski and McKay received the Michael "Switzer Leadership Award" from New Leaf Counseling Center in San Francisco.

== Reception ==
Why You Should Give a Damn About Gay Marriage received positive reviews from Brad Benedict in Ambush Magazine, Joe E. Jeffreys in the Bay Area Reporter, the novelist Lori L. Lake in Sinister Wisdom,. It received a mixed review from Andrew Hicks in The Gayly Oklahoman.

Benedict described Why You Should Give a Damn About Gay Marriage as "a quick-witted, common sense handbook" and "a vital resource" for journalists covering the same-sex marriage debate. Jeffreys wrote that Kotulski had used "easy-to-understand, lively, conversational prose" to explain complicated legal matters. He credited her with advancing a "solid and speedy" argument for supporting same-sex marriage. Lake called the book "a quick and simple read". She predicted that readers would "begin to see new possibilities in their lives, and be inspired to join the growing freedom to marry movement".

Hicks found the beginning chapters "vivid and exciting", but believed that the later ones lacked entertainment value and contained too many illustrations and diagrams.

== Bibliography ==
- Benedict, Brad (2004). "Book Beat". Ambush Magazine. Vol. 22, no. 13.
- DeCrescenzo, Teresa (May 2004). "A Look at Books". Lesbian News. Vol. 29, no. 10. p. 37. ISSN 0739-1803.
- Hicks, Andrew (June 1, 2004). "Book Reviews". The Gayly Oklahoman. Vol. 22, no. 11. p. 17.
- Jeffreys, Joe E. (March 18, 2004). "Getting Hitched". Bay Area Reporter. Vol. 34, no. 12. p. 33. ISSN 2374-264X.
- Kotulski, Davina (2004). Why You Should Give a Damn About Gay Marriage (1st ed.). Los Angeles, Calif.: Advocate Books. ISBN 1555838731.
- Kotulski, Davina (February 1, 2012). "Seduce Your Muse February 1, 2012 Newsletter". davinakotulski.com. Archived from the original on March 27, 2012.
- Lake, Lori L. (Winter 2005–2006). "Books Reviewed" (PDF). Sinister Wisdom (66): 124. ISSN 0196-1853.
