= List of mutual planetary eclipses =

This is a List of mutual planetary eclipses, including occultations and transits.

Although mutual occultations of planets had been recorded in 581, 1170, 1590, and 1737, the first attempt to list past and future occultations of that nature was not made until 1970 during a manual search for conjunctions, in which Jan Meeus and Michael Walch discovered further occultations in 1522 (Note: Elongation insufficient for visibility.) and 1570, (Note: Occurred over the South Atlantic and Argentina.) published in 1970. In 1977, Edwin Goffin calculated the occultations of certain planetary combinations for 1000–3000, but the results remained unpublished.

The first table dedicated to mutual planetary occultations was published in 1979 by Steven Albers, who employed a Fortran program to assist in his calculations. This table was extended back in time by Salvo De Meis in 1993. Meeus recalculated mutual occultations for most of this period in 1998, extending it slightly further forward in time, and in the same year the Pluto Project extended it far into the future. The accuracy of more distant dates is suspect, especially for Mercury, but no planet is exempt from error. Despite this, occultation calculations have been carried out to extremely early and late dates.

The visibility of the calculated occultations has been evaluated by multiple authors. The tables have also been revised and extended even further back and forward in time. But no evaluation is complete, and tables have yet to be computed for non-geocentric perspectives, although the concept has been explored more than once. Very close conjunctions, such as that on 25 March -184, have been excluded from the list.

Projected dates are not necessarily accurate before the 8th century BC or far into the future. Going back in time, the Length of Day (LOD) on Earth was shorter, but it is not known exactly how much shorter thanks to a variety of factors still being debated. Earth's LOD difference (ΔT) is slight, but the cumulative time discrepancy from the earliest accurately dated solar eclipses to the time this discrepancy was first noticed is several hours. Because of this difference, the positions of objects in the sky as viewed from a given point on Earth's surface remain uncertain before the beginning of these records. Although there has been much discussion on the relative contributions of these phenomena, no accurate model for extrapolating beyond these early records yet exists.

View	Date	Time	🝵	Oc-ng	Oc-ed	Type (Note: "T" if total (occultation), "A" if annular (transit). Otherwise, "the maximum fraction of the occulted diameter" at the point of Earth's surface coming closst to the axis of the shadow is given (where the degree of occultation is the greatest). If this has not been calculated, "P" for partial.)	Dur.	Mag	mag	ds	∠☉︎	Naked eye viewability	Sources
Earth	-6856-06-04	4:04	♃🝵♄	Jupiter	Saturn		3:10						
Earth	-2948-05-09	19:33	♂︎🝵♃	Mars	Jupiter	A	0:30	-2.0	1.0	5.5	51		
Earth	-2926-12-15	14:06	♀🝵♄	Venus	Saturn	P	0:12	-4.1	0.5	10.3	44		
Earth	-2885-09-13	21:10	♀🝵♃	Venus	Jupiter	P	0:08	-3.9	-1.6	22.1	27		
Earth	-2806-04-06	19:07	♀🝵♃	Venus	Jupiter	A	0:16	-3.9	-1.9	8.7	8	Too close to Sun?	
Earth	-2736-04-04	16:31	♀🝵♃	Venus	Jupiter	A	0:19	-3.9	-2.0	7.5	38		
Earth	-2681-11-16	17:43	♀🝵♃	Venus	Jupiter	P	0:51	-3.9	-1.8	45.5	20		
Earth	-2455-11-29	14:38	♀🝵♃	Venus	Jupiter	P	0:12	-3.9	-1.8	15.6	13	Too close to Sun?	
Earth	-2354-08-09	16:55	♀🝵♄	Venus	Saturn	P	0:08	-3.9	0.7	8.2	14	Too close to Sun?	
Earth	-2296-04-06	0:56	♀🝵♃	Venus	Jupiter	A	0:16	-3.9	-1.9	6.0	7	Too close to Sun?	
Earth	-2121-05-18	5:53	♀🝵♂︎	Venus	Mars	T	0:18	2.6	1.6	13.2	1	Too close to Sun	
No Mercury dates before this point (model inaccuracy); no Uranus or Neptune dates (undiscovered).
Earth	-1990-02-01	18:48	♂︎🝵♃	Mars	Jupiter	P	0:08	-2.1	0.6	25.9	80.4		
Earth	-1970-08-07	11:17	♀🝵♄	Venus	Saturn	P	0:07	-4.0	0.7	12.1	22.9		
Earth	-1968-07-24	7:42	♀🝵♄	Venus	Saturn	A	0:09	-4.0	1.1	3.6	11.2	Too close to Sun	
Earth	-1967-11-29	4:35	☿🝵♃	Mercury	Jupiter	A	0:12	-1.8	-0.5	6.6	19.5		
Earth	-1926-03-14	8:50	♀🝵⛢	Venus	Uranus	P	0:02	-4.0	5.8	10.0	15.6	Undiscovered, too close to Venus	
Earth	-1891-09-05	6:56	♂︎🝵⛢	Mars	Uranus	T	0:04	1.5	5.6	2.5	7.9	Undiscovered, too close to Sun, Mars	
Earth	-1887-09-07	21:19	♀🝵♃	Venus	Jupiter	A	0:14	-4.0	-1.7	12.5	26.9		
Earth	-1780-09-23	5:13	♀🝵♃	Venus	Jupiter	P	0:06	-4.1	-1.7	25.4	33.0		
Earth	-1767-07-07	4:03	♀🝵♄	Venus	Saturn	P	0:09	-4.0	0.2	12.1	33.3		
Earth	-1680-01-12	10:50	♀🝵♃	Venus	Jupiter	P	0:09	-4.0	-2.0	21.3	18.3		
Earth	-1678-01-29	5:59	♀🝵♃	Venus	Jupiter	A	0:15	-4.0	-2.0	13.7	23.1		
Earth	-1638-12-02	8:53	♀🝵♄	Venus	Saturn	T	0:11	-4.2	0.6	6.9	40.8		
Earth	-1615-10-04	15:49	♂︎🝵♄	Mars	Saturn	P	0:10	1.6	1.2	10.7	54.2		
Earth	-1588-10-31	12:27	♀🝵♃	Venus	Jupiter	A	0:14	-4.0	-1.8	10.6	9.7	Too close to Sun?	
Earth	-1556-09-18	1:38	☿🝵♀	Mercury	Venus	P	0:09	-4.0	-0.3	6.1	17.9		
Earth	-1488-02-27	16:58	♀🝵♃	Venus	Jupiter	A	0:17	-4.0	-2.0	2.1	7.9	Too close to Sun?	
Earth	-1452-02-13	14:06	♂︎🝵⛢	Mars	Uranus	T	0:05	0.8	5.8	5.3	67.9	Undiscovered, too close to Mars	
Earth	-1403-11-28	9:15	♀🝵♄	Venus	Saturn	P	0:08	-4.2	0.6	17.1	41.9		
Earth	-1402-08-30	9:22	♃🝵⛢	Jupiter	Uranus	T	1:42	-1.9	5.5	7.5	50.8	Undiscovered, too close to Jupiter	
Earth	-1360-12-23	18:42	☿🝵♃	Mercury	Jupiter	A	0:10	-2.0	-1.0	18.6	17.6		
Earth	-1346-11-07	1:08	♂︎🝵♆	Mars	Neptune			1.4	8.0	8.0	62.1	Undiscovered, too close to Mars	
Earth	-1300-12-26	23:38	♂︎🝵♃	Mars	Jupiter	A	0:27	-2.1	1.3	6.2	34.7		
Earth	-1255-12-25	1:12	☿🝵♂︎	Mercury	Mars	T	0:05	-1.1	1.2	1.3	16.1	Too close to Sun?	
Earth	-1237-11-23	20:58	♀🝵☿	Venus	Mercury	T	0:13	-4.5	-0.5	31.8	21.4		
Earth	-1233-08-06	17:53	♀🝵⛢	Venus	Uranus	T	0:05	-4.0	5.6	2.0	22.9	Undiscovered, too close to Venus	
Earth	-1216-01-13	6:38	☿🝵♄	Mercury	Saturn	A	0:05	-1.4	0.9	1.2	11.7	Too close to Sun	
Earth	-1168-01-29	9:32	♀🝵♃	Venus	Jupiter	P	0:11	-2.1	-1.2	20.4	24.7		
Earth	-1144-12-29	11:45	♀🝵♆	Venus	Neptune	T	0:04	-4.1	8.0	10.2	35.1	Undiscovered, too close to Venus	
Earth	-1127-08-05	20:38	♀🝵♃	Venus	Jupiter	P	0:11	-4.0	-1.7	17.5	22.6		
Earth	-1111-04-18	23:24	☿🝵♂︎	Mercury	Mars	T	0:02	-2.1	1.4	1.8	3.6	Too close to Sun	
Earth	-1098-02-04	0:43	♀🝵♄	Venus	Saturn	A	0:09	-4.0	1.0	3.8	5.5	Too close to Sun	
Earth	-992-10-21	3:12	☿🝵♄	Mercury	Saturn	P	0:05	-0.7	0.7	14.8	19.9		
Earth	-978-02-27	4:51	♀🝵♃	Venus	Jupiter	P	0:10	-4.0	-2.0	20.5	9.5	Too close to Sun?	
Earth	-928-12-11	14:29	☿🝵♂︎	Mercury	Mars	P	0:03	-0.6	1.3	6.3	15.3	Too close to Sun?	
Earth	-910-09-21	17:58	☿🝵♀	Mercury	Venus	P	0:09	-4.0	-1.4	6.2	4.9	Too close to Sun	
Earth	-891-09-02	13:34	♀🝵♃	Venus	Jupiter	A	0:16	-4.0	-1.7	4.5	26.8		
Earth	-864-08-29	21:22	☿🝵♆	Mercury	Neptune			-0.6	8.0	13.1	17.9	Undiscovered, too close to Mercury	
Earth	-816-12-13	18:35	♀🝵♃	Venus	Jupiter	A	0:16	-4.0	-1.9	1.9	15.0		
Earth	-772-03-06	23:13	♀🝵♆	Venus	Neptune	T	0:04	-1.4	8.0	3.7	10.0	Undiscovered, too close to Venus	
Earth	-771-09-11	6:50	☿🝵♃	Mercury	Jupiter	A	0:08	-1.7	-1.6	10.9	0.4	Too close to Sun	
Earth	-763-05-03	18:16	♀🝵♆	Venus	Neptune	T	0:07	-4.2	7.9	4.9	44.0	Undiscovered, too close to Venus	
Earth	-718-03-26	4:39	♀🝵♃	Venus	Jupiter	A	0:19	-4.0	-2.1	2.3	36.3		
Earth	-696-03-16	16:55	♂︎🝵⛢	Mars	Uranus	T	0:06	0.0	5.7	11.1	94.1	Undiscovered	
Earth	-663-11-04	18:33	☿🝵♃	Mercury	Jupiter	P	0:05	-1.7	-0.8	20.1	13.3	Too close to Sun	
Earth	-621-05-21	7:11	♀🝵♃	Venus	Jupiter	P	0:44	-4.3	-2.0	42.4	18.7		
Earth	-582-07-24	12:35	♂︎🝵♃	Mars	Jupiter	P	0:09	-1.7	1.8	18.2	19.2		
Earth	-557-09-12	14:26	♀🝵⛢	Venus	Uranus	T	0:04	-4.1	5.5	11.2	35.3	Undiscovered, too close to Venus	
Earth	-553-01-27	18:02	♀🝵♃	Venus	Jupiter	A	0:17	-4.0	-2.0	2.0	21.5		
Earth	-529-07-27	5:52	♀🝵♆	Venus	Neptune	T	0:05	-4.0	8.0	1.8	27.8	Undiscovered, too close to Venus	
Earth	-512-08-11	10:31	♀🝵♃	Venus	Jupiter	P	0:10	-4.0	-1.8	20.2	22.4		
Earth	-492-04-16	10:10	♀🝵♂︎	Venus	Mars	T	0:09	-4.0	1.7	3.2	21.9		
Earth	-463-10-28	18:06	♀🝵♃	Venus	Jupiter	A	0:24	-4.5	-1.8	13.8	46.7		
Earth	-439-11-08	10:45	☿🝵♂︎	Mercury	Mars	T	0:04	-1.0	1.4	1.9	7.1	Too close to Sun	
Earth	-328-07-16	8:56	☿🝵♀	Mercury	Venus	0.02	0:01	-4.0	-1.1	10.5	15.4		
Earth	-281-11-16	7:20	♀🝵☿	Venus	Mercury	T	0:12	-4.0	-1.3	3.9	1.2	Too close to Sun	
Earth	-268-10-02	15:49	☿🝵♂︎	Mercury	Mars	T	0:03	1.7	1.2	9.1	13.0	Too close to Sun	
Earth	-265-05-21	13:09	☿🝵♃	Mercury	Jupiter	A	0:08	-1.9	-1.3	6.4	12.7	Too close to Sun	
Earth	-164-12-19	21:49	♀🝵♄	Venus	Saturn	0.52	0:08	-4.1	0.6	13.4	36.7		
Earth	-147-04-20	14:36	♀🝵♃	Venus	Jupiter	0.06	0:07	-4.0	-2.0	22.2	6.6	Too close to Sun	
Earth	-43-02-06	21:15	☿🝵♂︎	Mercury	Mars	0.16	0:04	-0.2	1.2	8.3	25.6		
Earth	-37-10-11	4:07	♀🝵⛢	Venus	Uranus	T	0:11	-4.0	5.7	1.2	10.9	Undiscovered, to close to Venus	
Earth	-9-01-3	12:24	♂︎🝵♄	Mars	Saturn	A	0:11	0.8	1.1	2.6	4.2	Too close to Sun	
Earth	-1-06-17	17:54	♀🝵♃	Venus	Jupiter	0.44	0:23	-4.4	-1.8	26.5	45.4	Partial: Southern Cone, Southern Africa, Antarctic Peninsula (uninhabited)	
Earth	21–05–22	6:39	☿🝵♃	Mercury	Jupiter	A	0:54	-1.8	1.2	6.4	21.9		
Earth	45–09–09	5:55	♂︎🝵♇	Mars	Pluto			-1.0	14.5	9.4	110.1	Undiscovered, too close to Mars	
Earth	80–03–06	8:51	☿🝵♄	Mercury	Saturn	0.36	0:07	0.1	1.1	14.3	27.7		
Earth	209–08–10	20:10	♀🝵♄	Venus	Saturn	0.33	0:07	-4.0	0.5	13.3	23.5	Grazing: New Zealand (uninhabited); Due to the angular resolution of the human eye, it was a visual occultation in Europe north of North Scandinavia/Kola, in Northeast Asia, and in South America (in the northern part of the Southern Cone and the Amazon and potentially in the rest of the Americas (but with low angular separation from the Sun).	
Earth	241–09–06	3:14	☿🝵♄	Mercury	Saturn	0.14	0:03	-1.1	1.1	15.31	16.1	Below horizon Seen from Europe (on the Dnieper), Mercury and Saturn would have merged visually in the morning; Venus closeby.	
Earth	272–06–30	6:18	♂︎🝵♃	Mars	Jupiter	A	0:32	-1.8	1.7	4.0	40.5	Annular: Eastern and Central Europe (visual in early morning, true in late morning), Asia (fainter in some regions), Egypt, East Africa; Visual-only in Italy; during a planetary parade.	
Earth	317–08–09	17:25	☿🝵♂︎	Mercury	Mars	0.10	0:01	-0.8	1.8	6.95	13.0	Too close to Sun	
Earth	333–03–02	1:08	☿🝵⛢	Mercury	Uranus	T	0:01	-1.9	5.9	5.8	5.4	Undiscovered, too close to Sun, Mercury	
Earth	359–12–03	2:53	☿🝵⚶	Mercury	Vesta			2.8	7.8	4.68	9.5	Undiscovered, too close to Sun, Mercury	
Earth	363–04–19	16:38	♀🝵♃	Venus	Jupiter	A	0:14	-4.0	-2.0	12.6	5.3	Too close to Sun	
Earth	392–12–09	0:28	♀🝵☿	Venus	Mercury	T	0:55	-4.3	2.3	12.8	9.8	Too close to Sun	
Earth	419–08–31	15:17	⚳🝵♇	Ceres	Pluto			7.3	15.7	3.27	96.2	Undiscovered	
Earth	428–10–25	1:17	♀🝵♃	Venus	Jupiter	A	0:14	-4.0	-1.7	11.3	6.2	Too close to Sun	
Earth	493–06–08	23:29	♂︎🝵♃	Mars	Jupiter	A	0:27	-2.2	1.0	11.2	55.5	Total: Europe from Moscow-Rostov east (visual-only on west of that), ...	
Earth	508–12–22	22:20	♀🝵⚶	Venus	Vesta			-3.9	7.9	2.76	14.1	Undiscovered, too close to Sun, Venus	
Earth	509–07–26	17:26	☿🝵♃	Mercury	Jupiter	A	0:08	-1.7	-0.6	12.4	17.6	Grazing: Europe (faint in the west), ...	
Earth	539–05–03	18:37	♃🝵♆	Jupiter	Neptune	P	0:32	-2.3	7.9	20.0	70.4	Undiscovered, too close to Jupiter	
Earth	578–05–12	18:23	☿🝵♂︎	Mercury	Mars	0.74	0:02	-2.1	1.5	5.1	3.7	Too close to Sun	
Earth	581–01–13	1:20	♀🝵♄	Venus	Saturn	0.24	0:06	-4.0	1.0	14.6	24.4	Partial: East Asia, East and Central North America, Oceania	
Earth	596–12–12	5:25	☿🝵⚳	Mercury	Ceres			0.9	8.5	6.15	17.7	Undiscovered, too close to Mercury	
Earth	681–12–31	21:29	♀🝵♃	Venus	Jupiter	0.17	0:13	-4.3	-2.1	27.5	43.9	Not visible in Europe. Venus and Galilean Moons were in syzygy, but this could not have been resolved with the equipment available at the time.	
Earth	700–09–17	16:06	♀🝵♃	Venus	Jupiter	0.09	0:08	-4.0	-1.7	20.4	5.5	Too close to Sun	
Earth	713–04–02	5:51	♀🝵♆	Venus	Neptune	0.22	0:04	-4.0	7.9	20.2	20.2	Undiscovered, too close to Venus	
Earth	732–06–22	12:42	♀🝵♃	Venus	Jupiter	P	0:12	-4.0	-1.9	17.5	15.6		
Earth	757–01–17	21:57	♀🝵☿	Venus	Mercury	T	0:14	-4.4	-0.2	3.3	22.9		
Earth	796–08–20	7:13	☿🝵♀	Mercury	Venus	A	0:10	-4.0	-1.4	0.3	5.4	Too close to Sun	
Earth	829–09–28	7:23	♀🝵♃	Venus	Jupiter	A	0:17	-4.1	-1.7	11.1	36.9		
Earth	914–07–23	18:21	♀🝵♄	Venus	Saturn	A	0:10	-4.0	0.2	1.3	30.0		
Earth	919–09–07	10:58	☿🝵♄	Mercury	Saturn	A	0:05	-1.4	1.1	3.5	9.2	Too close to Sun	
Earth	965–09–24	17:22	☿🝵⛢	Mercury	Uranus	T	0:02	-1.3	5.6	3.7	3.9	Undiscovered, too close to Sun, Mercury	
Earth	992–05–24	12:50	♀🝵♂︎	Venus	Mars	T	0:21	-4.2	1.8	12.4	17.7		
Earth	1026–04–16	18:40	☿🝵♄	Mercury	Saturn	A	0:04	-0.7	0.5	11.2	18.5		
Earth	1043–10–25	19:06	♀🝵♃	Venus	Jupiter	0.50	0:19	-4.4	-1.8	20.3	46.0		
Earth	1170–09–12	20:29	♂︎🝵♃	Mars	Jupiter	A	1:03	-2.5	-0.4	5.8	105.5	Annular: Greenland, Iceland, Scandinavia North European Plain, Bohemia, Carpathian Basin, Balkans, European Russia, Asia, East Africa, Oceania	
Earth	1191–12–31	19:45	♀🝵♃	Venus	Jupiter	0.06	0:09	-4.3	-2.1	32.0	44.8		
Earth	1194–03–26	11:01	♀🝵♆	Venus	Neptune	T	0:06	-4.1	8.0	0.7	38.8	Undiscovered, too close to Venus	
Earth	1204–04–22	19:31	♂︎🝵♃	Mars	Jupiter	0.02	0:10	-2.1	1.2	20.4	37.4		
Earth	1210–09–17	10:39	♀🝵♃	Venus	Jupiter	A	0:15	-4.0	-1.7	0.2	6.9	Too close to Sun	
Earth	1253–12–08	9:11	☿🝵♄	Mercury	Saturn	A	0:16	0.5	0.7	9.0	14.8	Too close to Sun?	
Earth	1278–08–25	14:29	♂︎🝵♆	Mars	Neptune	T	0:04	1.7	8.0	0.7	0.4	Undiscovered, too close to Sun, Mars	
Earth	1286–10–30	5:42	♀🝵♆	Venus	Neptune	T	0:08	-4.4	8.0	5.1	45.6	Undiscovered, too close to Venus	
Earth	1362–06–18	11:21	♀🝵⛢	Venus	Uranus	P	0:03	-4.0	5.7	8.4	6.1	Undiscovered, too close to Sun, Venus	
Earth	1372–11–17	8:07	♀🝵☿	Venus	Mercury	0.93	0:09	-4.5	-0.6	47.8	21.0		
Earth	1383–08–19	15:00	♀🝵⛢	Venus	Uranus	T	0:05	-4.0	5.6	6.8	30.5	Undiscovered, too close to Venus	
Earth	1387–09–30	0:09	♂︎🝵♃	Mars	Jupiter	A	0:27	-1.7	1.8	9.8	17.3	Annular: Balkhash, Baikal, India ... Partial: ...	
Earth	1416–08–17	23:44	♀🝵♄	Venus	Saturn	A	0:10	-4.0	0.3	3.3	24.9	Annular: ... Partial: Tartu, Vitebsk, Oryol, Rostov ... and east	
Earth	1427–08–30	7:40	♀🝵♆	Venus	Neptune	T	0:05	-4.1	8.0	5.9	36.1	Undiscovered, too close to Venus	
Earth	1447–06–20	10:55	♃🝵♆	Jupiter	Neptune	T	1:54	-1.9	8.0	9.9	72.2	Undiscovered, too close to Jupiter	
Earth	1477–08–10	19:45	♀🝵♄	Venus	Saturn	0.25	0:06	-4.0	0.6	12.7	1.3	Too close to Sun	
Earth	1477–10–18	15:12	♂︎🝵♄	Mars	Saturn	A	0:15	0.9	1.6	6.0	53.2	Annular: ... Partial: Britain, Iberia, Iceland, Svalbard, Severny Island, Kamchatka, ...	
Earth	1522–01–28	8:09	♂︎🝵♄	Mars	Saturn	A	0:10	-1.1	0.8	5.4	0.2	Too close to Sun	
Earth	1570–02–05	7:46	♀🝵♃	Venus	Jupiter	0.24	0:12	-4.0	-1.9	18.1	24.6	Partial: Argentina	
Earth	1590–10–13	4:52	♀🝵♂︎	Venus	Mars	T	0:09	-4.1	1.8	7.0	34.0	Total: Southern Africa, ... Partial: London, Dresden, Prague, Kraków, Lutsk, Poltava ... and south	
Earth	1613–01–03	23:47	♃🝵♆	Jupiter	Neptune	T	10:10	-2.2	7.9	5.06	107.4	Undiscovered, too close to Jupiter	
Earth	1623–08–15	16:53	♃🝵⛢	Jupiter	Uranus	T	1:23	-1.8	5.6	5.03	9.2	Undiscovered, too close to Jupiter	
Earth	1702-09-19	13:58	♃🝵♆	Jupiter	Neptune	T	3:24	-2.9	7.8	2.50	164.8	Undiscovered, too close to Jupiter	
Earth	1705-07-20	23:39	☿🝵♃	Mercury	Jupiter	0.02	0:03	-1.9	-1.2	23.2	14.9	Close to Sun; Partial: Australia, New Zealand, ...	
Earth	1708-07-14	13:02	☿🝵⛢	Mercury	Uranus	T	0:03	-0.1	5.6	6.3	24.7	Undiscovered, too close to Mercury	
Earth	1708-10-04	12:41	☿🝵♃	Mercury	Jupiter	A	0:08	-1.7	-1.7	11.8	0.2	Too close to Sun	
Earth	1737-05-28	21:51	♀🝵☿	Venus	Mercury	T	0:09	-4.4	-0.3	36.2	22.1	Total: Iceland, Outer Manchuria, Baikal, ... Partial: Britain, Denmark, Scandinavia, Kamchatka, ...	
Earth	1771-08-29	19:38	♀🝵♄	Venus	Saturn	0.52	0:08	-4.0	0.5	9.3	14.3	Close to Sun; Partial: New Zealand, far Eastern Australia, Fiji, far Southern Cone	
Earth	1793-07-21	5:38	☿🝵⛢	Mercury	Uranus	T	0:03	-0.2	5.6	23.7	23.7	Too close to Mercury	
Earth	1808-12-09	20:34	☿🝵♄	Mercury	Saturn	0.02	0:02	-0.7	0.5	16.9	20.2	Partial: South Pole	
Earth	1818-01-03	21:52	♀🝵♃	Venus	Jupiter	A	0:14	-4.0	-1.8	12.2	16.5	Annular: Sakhalin, Kurils, Russia (Kamchatka); Partial: China (Primorye), Korea, Taiwan	
Earth	1905-12-14	7:15	☿🝵⚶	Mercury	Vesta			4.9	7.6	4.08	4.1	Too close to Sun	
Earth	2019-02-08	9:00	22🝵♃	Kalliope	Jupiter			-1.9	11		60	Too close to Jupiter	
Neptune	2046-04-29		♄🝵♃	Saturn	Jupiter								
Earth	2065-11-22	12:44	♀🝵♃	Venus	Jupiter	0.31	0:12	-4.0	-1.7	14.2	7.8	Too close to Sun? Partial: Kansas, Oklahoma, Texas, Coahuila, Durango, Nayarit, Clipperton Island ...	
Earth	2067-07-15	11:54	☿🝵♆	Mercury	Neptune	T	0:01	-0.7	8.0	9.7	18.4	Too close to Mercury; Total: North Pole; Partial: Oregon, California ...	
Earth	2079-08-11	1:29	☿🝵♂︎	Mercury	Mars	T	0:03	-1.5	1.7	1.4	11.2	Too close to Sun; Total: Dagestan, Armenia, Azerbaijan, Iran, UAE, Oman; Partial: European Russia, Finland	
Earth	2088-10-27	13:41	☿🝵♃	Mercury	Jupiter	0.10	0:05	-1.7	-1.4	18.9	4.6	Too close to Sun	
Earth	2094-04-07	10:47	☿🝵♃	Mercury	Jupiter	A	0:08	-2.1	-2.1	6.7	1.4	Too close to Sun	
Earth	2104–08–21	1:16	♀🝵♆	Venus	Neptune	T	0:05	-4.0	8.0	0.3	26.6	Too close to Venus	
Earth	2123–09–14	15:25	♀🝵♃	Venus	Jupiter	A	0:15	-4.0	-1.7	5.9	16.2	Annular: Alaska, Pacific Ocean	
Earth	2126–07–29	16:06	☿🝵♂︎	Mercury	Mars	0.79	0:02	-1.7	1.7	5.3	9.1	Too close to Sun	
Earth	2133–12–03	14:10	♀🝵☿	Venus	Mercury	T	0:10	-4.1	-1.1	37.3	4.2	Too close to Sun	
Earth	2223–06–21	20:30	♀🝵⚶	Venus	Vesta			-4.0	8.3	7.98	5.7	Too close to Sun	
Earth	2223–12–02	12:26	♂︎🝵♃	Mars	Jupiter	A	0:26	-2.4	0.0	20.5	89.2		
Earth	2240–11–04	0:58	♀🝵⚳	Venus	Ceres			-4.5	8.3	14.06	47.1	Too close to Venus	
Earth	2243–08–12	4:48	♀🝵♄	Venus	Saturn	0.04	0:03	-4.0	0.7	16.5	16.1		
Earth	2251–03–04	10:47	♀🝵⛢	Venus	Uranus	T	0:05	-4.0	5.9	4.6	25.4	Too close to Venus	
Earth	2307–09–11	22:23	♀🝵⛢	Venus	Uranus	0.62	0:03	-4.0	5.5	11.1	28.5	Too close to Venus	
Earth	2327–06–04	0:45	♀🝵♂︎	Venus	Mars	T	0:18	-4.4	1.3	30.6	21.5		
Earth	2335–10–08	14:44	♀🝵♃	Venus	Jupiter	0.22	0:12	-4.1	-1.8	20.6	35.4		
Earth	2351–04–07	17:15	☿🝵⛢	Mercury	Uranus	T	0:02	-2.0	5.9	3.6	3.7	Too close to Sun	
Earth	2419–12–30	1:25	♀🝵⛢	Venus	Uranus	T	0:27	-4.7	5.9	4.2	42.5	Too close to Venus	
Earth	2478–08–29	22:58	♂︎🝵♃	Mars	Jupiter	A	0:21	-1.7	1.8	14.0	11.2	Too close to Sun	
Earth	2515–04–07	10:19	♂︎🝵♆	Mars	Neptune	T	0:03	1.2	8.0	3.8	19.9	Too close to Mars	
Earth	2518–01–25	22:26	♀🝵♄	Venus	Saturn	A	0:10	-4.1	0.5	4.2	32.6		
Earth	2649–02–16	10:50	♀🝵♆	Venus	Neptune	A	0:05	-4.1	8.0	1.3	45.7	Too close to Venus	
Earth	2781–12–03	6:04	♀🝵♆	Venus	Neptune	T	0:03	-4.0	8.0	9.5	26.3	Too close to Venus	
Earth	2816–03–25	15:04	☿🝵♃	Mercury	Jupiter	A	0:22	-2.0	0.1	7.6	27.5		
Earth	2817–03–06	8:53	♀🝵♄	Venus	Saturn	A	0:09	-4.0	0.7	1.0	20.0		
Earth	2818–04–11	19:58	☿🝵♂︎	Mercury	Mars	P	0:02	-1.9	1.2	4.8	5.0	Too close to Sun	
Earth	2825–02–06	9:58	♂︎🝵⛢	Mars	Uranus	T	0:05	1.4	5.7	0.9	49.1	Too close to Mars	
Earth	2830–12–15	6:52	♀🝵♂︎	Venus	Mars	T	0:13	-4.3	1.3	46.4	10.6	Too close to Sun	
Earth	2833–07–20	5:29	☿🝵♃	Mercury	Jupiter	P	0:08	-1.8	-0.1	21.7	25.0		
Earth	2912–02–12	20:03	♀🝵♃	Venus	Jupiter	A	0:17	-4.1	-2.1	11.5	36.3		
Earth	2954–11–08	1:47	♀🝵♃	Venus	Jupiter	P	0:06	-4.0	-1.7	22.0	1.1	Too close to Sun	
Earth	2954–11–21	0:56	☿🝵♄	Mercury	Saturn	P	0:05	-0.9	0.7	14.6	18.3		
Earth	2959–03–09	16:35	♂︎🝵♃	Mars	Jupiter	A	0:26	-2.0	-0.9	4.5	4.4	Too close to Sun	
Earth	2965–10–05	15:48	☿🝵♃	Mercury	Jupiter	A	0:08	-1.7	-1.4	8.1	4.4	Too close to Sun	
Earth	2986–08–13	8:05	♀🝵♃	Venus	Jupiter	A	0:14	-4.0	-1.9	14.3	21.5		
Earth	2991–03–22	13:40	♀🝵♆	Venus	Neptune	A	0:04	-4.1	9.0	12.0	38.4	Too close to Venus	
No Mercury dates after this point (model inaccuracy).
Earth	3127–06–12	0:02	♀🝵♃	Venus	Jupiter								
Earth	3156–08–08	13:38	♀🝵♄	Venus	Saturn	P	0:07	3.8	0.5	13.3	27		
Earth	3224–09–22	5:44	♀🝵♃	Venus	Jupiter	P	0:07	-3.8	-1.8	7.5	30		
Earth	3231–09–25	11:37	♀🝵⛢	Venus	Uranus	T	0:04	-3.8	5.5	7.7	27	Too close to Venus	
Earth	3243–10–13	18:24	♀🝵♆	Venus	Neptune	T	0:06	-3.9	8.0	0.6	40	Too close to Venus	
Earth	3249–07–27	19:49	♀🝵♃	Venus	Jupiter	P	0:10	-4.1	-1.8	29.5	44		
Earth	3324–01–08	13:06	♀🝵♃	Venus	Jupiter	A	0:14	-3.9	-1.8	11.6	15		
Earth	3332–07–10	0:36	♂︎🝵♄	Mars	Saturn	A	0:07	0.5	1.6	11.8	44		
Earth	3340–12–25	21:01	♀🝵♄	Venus	Saturn	T	0:36	-2.8	0.9	43.1	12	Too close to Sun	
Earth	3428–02–29	3:14	♃🝵♆	Jupiter	Neptune	T	5:02	-2.2	7.9	16.0	133	Too close to Venus	
Earth	3493–05–05	4:10	♂︎🝵♃	Mars	Jupiter	A	0:27	-2.0	1.0	3.4	27		
Earth	3693–03–10	17:41	♀🝵♃	Venus	Jupiter	A	0:17	-3.9	-1.8	1.9	28		
Earth	3873–06–11	13:12	♀🝵♃	Venus	Jupiter	P	1:24	-4.6	-2.0	28.1	39		
Earth	3914–01–30	9:20	♂︎🝵⛢	Mars	Uranus	P	0:04	1.4	5.6	4.3	40	Too close to Mars	
Earth	3950–09–18	18:09	♀🝵♄	Venus	Saturn	A	0:09	-3.9	0.5	6.6	15		
Earth	3973–12–10	9:18	♂︎🝵♃	Mars	Jupiter	A	0:31	-1.8	1.6	6.4	42		
Earth	4005–06–13	10:00	♀🝵♂︎	Venus	Mars	P	0:06	-3.9	1.4	7.3	19		
Earth	4024–03–16	22:30	♀🝵♄	Venus	Saturn	A	0:08	-3.9	0.9	8.8	20		
Earth	4056–09–10	9:59	♀🝵♃	Venus	Jupiter	A	0:15	-3.8	-1.6	10.8	28		
Earth	4125–02–15	11:14	♀🝵♂︎	Venus	Mars	P	0:08	-3.9	1.2	5.5	2	Too close to Sun	
Earth	4257–09–17	9:54	♀🝵♂︎	Venus	Mars	P	0:07	-3.9	1.6	5.2	11	Too close to Sun	
Earth	4305–08–27	4:46	♀🝵⛢	Venus	Uranus	T	0:03	-3.9	5.7	7.7	13	Too close to Sun, Venus	
Earth	4320–03–14	11:15	♀🝵♄	Venus	Saturn	A	0:09	-3.9	0.9	2.4	2	Too close to Sun	
Earth	4477–07–16	23:49	♀🝵⛢	Venus	Uranus	T	0:22	-4.5	5.6	20.2	41	Too close to Venus	
Earth	4492–08–16	11:04	♀🝵♃	Venus	Jupiter	P	0:12	-3.8	-1.9	18.3	21		
Earth	4517–07–15	4:41	♀🝵♃	Venus	Jupiter	P	1:15	-4.5	-1.8	42.0	37		
Earth	4648–08–28	3:14	♃🝵⛢	Jupiter	Uranus	T	1:12	-1.8	5.6	10.3	19	Too close to Venus	
Earth	4651–03–11	5:24	♂︎🝵♃	Mars	Jupiter								
Earth	4710–05–29	20:34	♀🝵⛢	Venus	Uranus	T	0:03	-3.9	5.9	7.2	12	Too close to Sun, Venus	
Earth	4757–12–24	19:27	♀🝵♆	Venus	Neptune	T	0:04	-3.9	8.0	4.7	23	Too close to Venus	
Earth	4830–01–13	0:02	♀🝵♃	Venus	Jupiter	A	0:15	-3.9	-1.6	7.2	13	Too close to Sun?	
Earth	4897–03–23	20:04	♃🝵⛢	Jupiter	Uranus	T	4:07	-2.5	5.4	1.5	159	Too close to Jupiter	
Earth	4927–04–21	4:08	♀🝵♃	Venus	Jupiter	A	0:18	-3.9	-1.9	8.1	36		
Earth	4998–12–19	9:07	♀🝵♂︎	Venus	Mars	T	1:06	-4.6	1.6	19.6	44		
Earth	5023–04–16	6:18	♀🝵⛢	Venus	Uranus	P	0:03	-3.9	5.9	11.6	31	Too close to Venus	
Earth	5135–08–18	21:50	♂︎🝵⛢	Mars	Uranus	P	0:02	1.1	5.8	6.6	38	Too close to Mars	
Earth	5188–08–21	4:58	♀🝵♄	Venus	Saturn	A	0:10	-3.8	0.5	3.0	31		
Earth	5199–03–06	12:21	♀🝵♄	Venus	Saturn	P	0:08	-3.9	0.9	9.9	28		
Earth	5199–03–15	20:50	♀🝵♃	Venus	Jupiter	A	0:16	-3.9	-1.8	7.2	26		
Earth	5231–03–27	18:43	♀🝵♄	Venus	Saturn	P	0:08	-3.9	0.9	8.9	21		
Earth	5233–03–12	4:27	♀🝵♄	Venus	Saturn	A	0:09	-3.9	0.9	1.0	13	Too close to Sun?	
Earth	5282–03–18	20:47	♀🝵♆	Venus	Neptune	T	0:05	-3.9	8.0	0.8	36	Too close to Venus	
Earth	5381–07–29	17:40	♀🝵♃	Venus	Jupiter	P	0:05	-3.9	-1.9	23.8	15		
Earth	5477–08–11	22:35	♀🝵⛢	Venus	Uranus	T	0:04	-3.9	5.7	1.5	5	Too close to Sun, Venus	
Earth	5531–07–01	3:48	♀🝵♄	Venus	Saturn	P	0:04	-4.1	0.7	24.4	44		
Earth	5578–02–25	1:03	♀🝵♃	Venus	Jupiter	A	0:14	-3.9	-1.8	12.9	21		
Earth	5595–08–22	8:39	♀🝵♄	Venus	Saturn	P	0:05	-3.8	0.6	16.9	30		
Earth	5615–01–05	12:47	♂︎🝵♄	Mars	Saturn	A	0:13	0.5	0.7	3.8	68		
Earth	5652–03–27	11:10	♀🝵♃	Venus	Jupiter	A	0:17	-3.9	-2.0	10.1	29		
Earth	5728–10–21	2:34	♀🝵♆	Venus	Neptune	T	0:04	-3.9	8.0	4.6	14	Too close to Sun, Venus	
Earth	5805–06–28	6:22	♀🝵⛢	Venus	Uranus	T	0:04	-3.9	5.8	5.4	8	Too close to Sun, Venus	
Earth	5821–04–05	11:14	♀🝵♄	Venus	Saturn	P	0:07	-3.9	0.9	9.2	12	Too close to Sun	
Earth	5883–11–06	19:14	♀🝵♃	Venus	Jupiter	P	0:10	-3.9	-1.6	18.6	12	Too close to Sun?	
Earth	5947–04–29	23:11	♀🝵⛢	Venus	Uranus	T	0:05	-3.9	5.9	3.4	33	Too close to Venus	
Earth	6121–07–12	23:15	♀🝵♄	Venus	Saturn	P	0:10	-3.9	0.7	9.4	38		
Earth	6132–04–03	2:03	♂︎🝵♆	Mars	Neptune	P	0:02	1.0	8.0	5.5	16	Too close to Sun, Mars	
Earth	6137–12–27	23:35	♂︎🝵♃	Mars	Jupiter	A	0:39	-2.4	-0.7	7.2	101		
Earth	6150–08–27	0:59	♀🝵⛢	Venus	Uranus	T	0:04	-3.9	5.7	0.6	7	Too close to Sun, Venus	
Earth	6236–10–01	6:32	♀🝵♃	Venus	Jupiter	A	0:17	-3.8	-1.9	6.7	28		
Earth	6286–10–24	2:35	♀🝵♃	Venus	Jupiter	A	0:14	-3.9	-1.6	11.4	19		
Earth	6287–02–26	16:27	♀🝵⛢	Venus	Uranus	T	0:07	-4.2	5.9	11.7	46	Too close to Venus	
Earth	6438–04–05	23:00	♀🝵♄	Venus	Saturn	P	0:06	-3.9	0.8	13.2	22		
Earth	6506–07–10	10:02	♂︎🝵♃	Mars	Jupiter	A	0:26	-2.0	0.9	6.6	43		
Earth	6534–10–11	20:26	♂︎🝵♄	Mars	Saturn	A	0:22	-1.0	0.4	13.8	107		
Earth	6607–12–15	8:16	♀🝵♃	Venus	Jupiter	A	0:15	-3.9	-1.5	6.2	1	Too close to Sun	
Earth	6623–08–01	3:03	♀🝵♄	Venus	Saturn	A	0:10	-3.8	0.7	1.9	33		
Earth	6673–04–03	17:09	♀🝵♄	Venus	Saturn	A	0:09	-3.9	0.8	3.6	23		
Earth	6673–06–24	18:36	♀🝵♃	Venus	Jupiter	A	0:14	-3.9	-2.0	14.8	3	Too close to Sun	
Earth	6707–04–08	14:23	♃🝵⛢	Jupiter	Uranus	T	1:18	-1.9	5.9	2.4	13	Too close to Sun, Jupiter	
Earth	6853–10–21	5:52	♀🝵♃	Venus	Jupiter	P	0:11	-3.8	-1.9	21.6	32		
Earth	6957–06–20	2:16	♀🝵♆	Venus	Neptune	T	0:11	-4.4	7.9	9.4	47	Too close to Venus	
Earth	7199–09–07	8:06	♂︎🝵♆	Mars	Neptune	T	0:04	1.5	8.0	0.9	49	Too close to Venus	
Earth	7249–08–17	1:33	♀🝵♄	Venus	Saturn	T	0:16	-4.2	0.5	7.1	46		
Earth	7290–07–16	0:55	♀🝵♃	Venus	Jupiter	P	0:12	-3.9	-2.0	17.6	8	Too close to Sun?	
Earth	7300–04–01	17:58	♂︎🝵♃	Mars	Jupiter	P	0:13	-1.9	1.0	18.0	21		
Earth	7304–09–17	17:23	♀🝵♄	Venus	Saturn	A	0:10	-3.8	0.6	1.0	27		
Earth	7462–03–12	17:05	♀🝵⛢	Venus	Uranus	T	0:07	-4.1	5.9	10.3	44	Too close to Venus	
Earth	7541–02–17	15:54	♃🝵♄	Jupiter	Saturn	P	5:03	-2.7	0.2	28.2	163		
Earth	7541–06–18	22:05	♃🝵♄	Jupiter	Saturn	T	4:44	-2.1	0.5	2.6	71		
Earth	8674–02–27	9:37	♃🝵♄	Jupiter	Saturn	P	2:41	-1.6	0.8	11.4	12	Too close to Sun?	
