= Dark moon =

Last visible crescent of waning moon

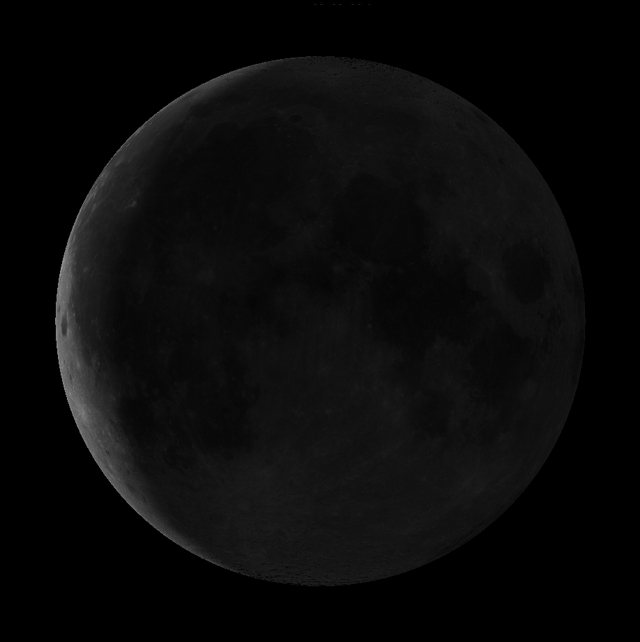
A waning moon

The term dark moon describes the last visible crescent of a waning Moon. The duration of a dark moon varies between 1.5 and 3.5 days, depending on its ecliptic latitude. In current astronomical usage, the new moon occurs in the middle of this dark period, when the Moon and Sun are in conjunction. This definition has entered popular usage, so that calendars will typically indicate the date of the "new moon" rather than the "dark moon".

== Dark moon as the 30th division ==
The Oxford English Dictionary defines the new moon as "the first visible crescent of the Moon, after conjunction with the Sun". Dark moon is a term used for a waning crescent moon. When the Moon's orbit is divided into 30 segments, as the ancient Greeks did in the time of Homer, the Babylonians did, and the Indians still do today (calling them tithi), the last phase is called the "dark moon". In Greek, it was called the "old moon" and associated with Hecate. In India, it is called Amavasya and associated with Kali. Both of these goddesses have a dark connotation, hence the term dark moon.

In Babylonian, Greek, and Indian culture, the dark moon occurs within the 12° of angular distance between the Moon and the Sun before conjunction (a type of syzygy). The new moon occurs within the 12° after syzygy. This 12° arc is called uma by the Babylonians and tithi by the Indians.

The Moon takes a mean duration of 23 hours and 37 minutes to cover this length, but this period can vary from 21 to 26 hours because of the Moon's orbital anomaly. This means that the "dark moon" actually lasts approximately 23 hours and 37 minutes and includes any time marked as "new moon" on a lunar calendar, and not 1.5 to 3.5 days as stated earlier.

== See also ==
- Amavasya – Lunar phase near new moon
- Black Moon (disambiguation)
- Lunar phase – Shape of the Moon's sunlit portion as viewed from Earth
- Syzygy (astronomy) – Alignment of celestial bodies
