= Planetary alignment =

Planetary alignment can mean:

- a syzygy (astronomy), in which celestial bodies line up in 3D space
- a planetary parade, in which planets appear to line up in the night sky as seen from a particular viewpoint in space
