= Hanyo =

Hanyo may refer to:

- The Housemaid (1960 film) (Korean: Hanyŏ), a South Korean film
- The Housemaid (2010 film) (Korean: Hanyŏ), a remake of the above
- "Half Breed" (Japanese: Han'yō), chapter 12 of Inuyasha, a manga series
