= Blue moon =

Astronomical phenomenon

A blue moon refers to the presence of a second full moon in a calendar month, the third full moon in a season containing four, or a moon that appears blue due to atmospheric effects.

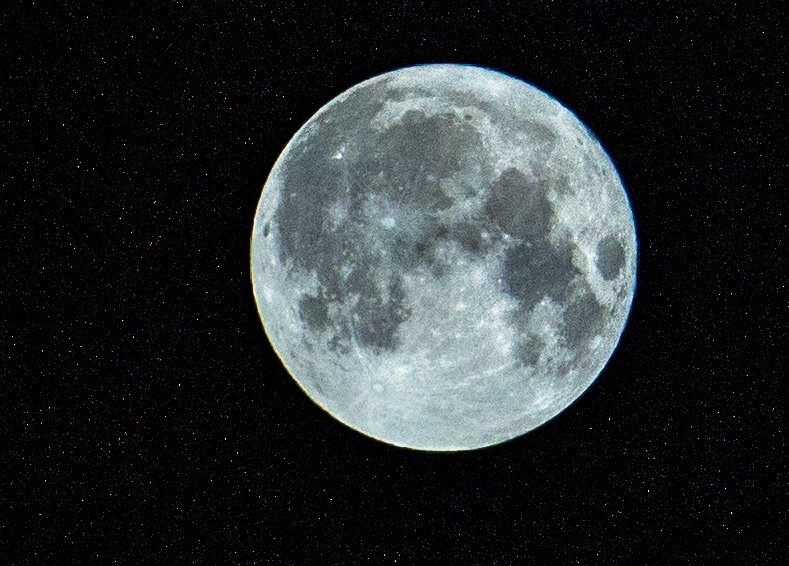
The second full moon in a calendar month, on October 31, 2020

The calendrical meaning of "blue moon" is unconnected to the other meanings. It is often referred to as "traditional", but since no occurrences are known prior to 1937 it is better described as an invented tradition or "modern American folklore". The practice of designating the second full moon in a month as "blue" originated with amateur astronomer James Hugh Pruett in 1946. It does not come from Native American lunar tradition, as is sometimes supposed.

The moon—not necessarily full—can sometimes appear blue due to atmospheric emissions from large forest fires or volcanoes, though the phenomenon is rare and unpredictable (hence the saying "once in a blue moon"). A calendrical blue moon (by Pruett's definition) is predictable and relatively common, happening 7 times in every 19 years (i.e. once every 2 or 3 years). Calendrical blue moons occur because the time between successive full moons (approximately 29.5 days) is shorter than the average calendar month. They are of no astronomical or historical significance, and are not a product of actual lunisolar timekeeping or intercalation.

== Phrase origin ==
A 1528 satire, Rede Me and Be Nott Wrothe, contained the lines, "Yf they saye the mone is belewe / We must beleve that it is true." The intended sense was of an absurd belief, like the moon being made of cheese. There is nothing to connect it with the later metaphorical or calendrical meanings of "blue moon". However, a confusion of belewe (Middle English, "blue") with belǽwan (Old English "to betray")) led to a false etymology for the calendrical term that remains widely circulated, despite its originator having acknowledged it as groundless.

Percy Bysshe Shelley's poem "Alastor" (1816) mentioned an erupting volcano and a "blue moon / Low in the west." It was written at a time when the eruption of Mount Tambora was causing global climate effects, and not long before the first recorded instances of "blue moon" as a metaphor.

The OED cites Pierce Egan's Real Life in London (1821) as the earliest known occurrence of "blue moon" in the metaphorical sense of a long time. ("How's Harry and Ben?—haven't seen you this blue moon.") An 1823 revision of Francis Grose's Classical Dictionary of the Vulgar Tongue, edited by Egan, included the definition: "Blue moon. In allusion to a long time before such a circumstance happens. 'O yes, in a blue moon'." An earlier (1811) version of the same dictionary had not included the phrase, so it was likely coined some time in the 1810s. "Once in a blue moon" is recorded from 1833.

The use of blue moon to mean a specific calendrical event dates from 1937, when the Maine Farmers' Almanac used the term in a slightly different sense from the one now in common use. According to the OED, "Earlier occurrences of the sense given in the Maine Farmers' Almanac have not been traced, either in editions of the Almanac prior to 1937, or elsewhere; the source of this application of the term (if it is not a coinage by the editor, H. P. Trefethen) is unclear." The conjecture of editorial invention is further supported by the spurious explanation the almanac gave:

The Moon usually comes full twelve times in a year, three times in each season... However, occasionally the moon comes full thirteen times in a year. This was considered a very unfortunate circumstance, especially by the monks who had charge of the calendar. It became necessary for them to make a calendar of thirteen months, and it upset the regular arrangement of church festivals. For this reason thirteen came to be considered an unlucky number. Also, this extra moon had a way of coming in each of the seasons so that it could not be given a name appropriate to the time of year like the other moons. It was usually called the Blue Moon... In olden times the almanac makers had much difficulty calculating the occurrence of the Blue Moon and this uncertainty gave rise to the expression "Once in a Blue Moon".

There is no evidence that an extra moon in a month, season or year was considered unlucky, or that it led to 13 being considered unlucky, or that the extra moon was called "blue", or that it led to the phrase "once in a blue moon". There is good reason to suspect that the 1937 article was a hoax, a practical joke, or simply misinformed. It is however true that the date of the Christian festival of Easter depended on an accurate computation of full moon dates, and important work was done by the monks Dionysius Exiguus and Bede, explained by the latter in The Reckoning of Time, written c725 CE. According to Bede, "Whenever it was a common year, [the Anglo-Saxons] gave three lunar months to each season. When an embolismic year occurred (that is, one of 13 lunar months) they assigned the extra month to summer, so that three months together bore the name Litha; hence they called [the embolismic] year Thrilithi. It had four summer months, with the usual three for the other seasons." The name Litha is now applied by some Neo-Pagans to midsummer.

The 1937 Maine Farmers' Almanac article was misinterpreted by James Hugh Pruett in a 1946 Sky and Telescope article, leading to the calendrical definition of "blue moon" that is now commonly used, i.e. the second full moon in a calendar month. "A blue moon in the original Maine Farmers' Almanac sense can only occur in the months of February, May, August, and November. In the latter sense, one can occur in any month except February." This later sense gained currency from its use in a United States radio programme, StarDate on January 31, 1980, and in a question in the Trivial Pursuit game in 1986.

Several songs have been titled "Blue Moon", seen as a "symbol of sadness and loneliness."

== Visually blue moon ==
An ESA radio telescope located at the New Norcia Station, Western Australia, tracking the "super blue moon" of August 30, 2023. The blue colour is an effect of the camera.

The moon (and sun) can appear blue under certain atmospheric conditions – for instance, if volcanic eruptions or large-scale fires release particles into the atmosphere of just the right size to preferentially scatter red light. According to the Encyclopædia Britannica, scattering is the cause of "that epitome of rare occurrences, the blue Moon (seen when forest fires produce clouds composed of small droplets of organic compounds)."

A Royal Society report on the 1883 Krakatoa eruption gave a detailed account of "blue, green, and other coloured appearances of the sun and moon" seen in many places for months afterwards.. The report mentioned that in February 1884 an observer in Central America saw the crescent moon as "a magnificent emerald-green" while its earthlit part was "pale green". Venus, bright stars and a comet were also green. The report authors suspected that green moons were a contrast effect, since in those cases the surrounding sky was seen as red.

People saw blue moons in 1983 after the eruption of the El Chichón volcano in Mexico, and there are reports of blue moons caused by Mount St. Helens in 1980 and Mount Pinatubo in 1991.

The moon looked blue after forest fires in Sweden and Canada in 1950 and 1951, On September 23, 1950, several muskeg fires that had been smoldering for several years in Alberta, Canada, suddenly blew up into major—and very smoky—fires. Winds carried the smoke eastward and southward with unusual speed, and the conditions of the fire produced large quantities of oily droplets of just the right size (about 1 micrometre in diameter) to scatter red and yellow light. Wherever the smoke cleared enough so that the sun was visible, it was lavender or blue. Ontario, Canada, and much of the east coast of the United States were affected by the following day, and two days later, observers in Britain reported an indigo sun in smoke-dimmed skies, followed by an equally blue moon that evening.

Ice particles might have a similar effect. The Antarctic diary of Robert Falcon Scott for July 11, 1911 mentioned "the air thick with snow, and the moon a vague blue".

The key to a blue moon is having many particles slightly wider than the wavelength of red light (0.7 micrometer)—and no other sizes present. Ash and dust clouds thrown into the atmosphere by fires and storms usually contain a mixture of particles with a wide range of sizes, with most smaller than 1 micrometer, and they tend to scatter blue light. This kind of cloud makes the moon turn red; thus red moons are far more common than blue moons.

== Calendrical blue moon ==
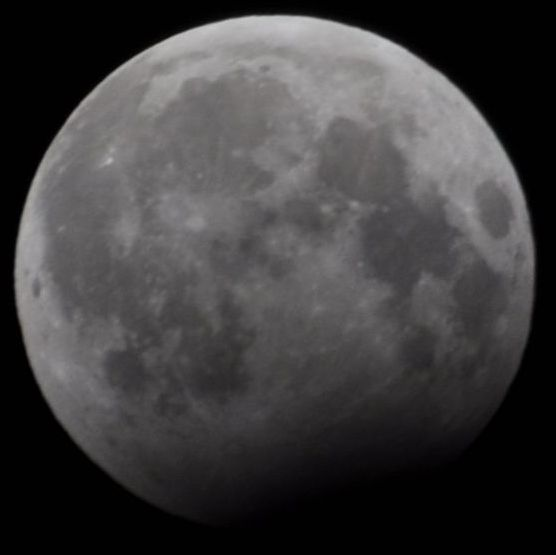
A calendrical "blue moon" during the December 2009 lunar eclipse

Blue moon as a calendrical term originated with the 1937 Maine Farmers' Almanac, a provincial U.S. magazine that is not to be confused with the Farmers' Almanac, Old Farmer's Almanac, or other American almanacs. There is no evidence of "blue moon" having been used as a specific calendrical term before 1937, and it was possibly invented by the magazine's editor, Henry Porter Trefethen (1887–1957). As a term for the second full moon in a calendar month it began to be widely known in the U.S. in the mid-1980s and became internationally known in the late 1990s when calendrical matters were of special interest given the approaching millennium. It created a misapprehension that the calendrical meaning of "blue moon" had preceded the metaphorical one, and inspired various folk etymologies, e.g. the "betrayer" speculation mentioned earlier, or that it came from a printing convention in calendars or a saying in Czech. A 1997 Taiwanese movie, Blue Moon, had the log line "There is usually only one full moon every month, but occasionally there are two – and that second full moon is called the Blue Moon. It is said that when a person sees a blue moon and makes a wish, he will be granted a second chance in things."

In 1999, folklorist Philip Hiscock presented a timeline for the calendrical term. First, the August page of the 1937 Maine Farmers' Almanac ran a sidebar claiming that the term was used "in olden times" for an extra full moon in a season, and gave some examples (21 November 1915, 22 August 1918, 21 May 1921, 20 February 1924, 21 November 1934, 22 August 1937, and 21 May 1940). Six years later, Laurence J. Lafleur (1907–66) quoted the almanac in the U.S. magazine Sky & Telescope (July 1943, page 17) in answer to a reader's question about the meaning of "blue moon". Then James Hugh Pruett (1886–1955) quoted it again in Sky & Telescope (March 1946, p3), saying "seven times in 19 years there were — and still are — 13 full moons in a year. This gives 11 months with one full moon each and one with two. This second in a month, so I interpret it, was called Blue Moon". In 1980 the term was used (with Pruett's definition) in a U.S. radio program, Star Date, and in 1985 it appeared in a U.S. children's book, The Kids' World Almanac of Records and Facts ("What is a blue moon? When there are two full moons in a month, the second one is called a blue moon. It is a rare occurrence.") In 1986 it was included as a question in Trivial Pursuit (likely taken from the children's book), and in 1988 a forthcoming blue moon received widespread press coverage.

In 1999 U.S. astronomer Donald W. Olson researched the original articles and published the results in a Sky & Telescope article co-authored with Richard T Fienberg and Roger W. Sinnott. From the examples given by Trefethen in the 1937 Maine Farmers' Almanac they deduced a "rule" he must effectively have used. "Seasonal Moon names are assigned near the spring equinox in accordance with the ecclesiastical rules for determining the dates of Easter and Lent. The beginnings of summer, fall, and winter are determined by the dynamical mean Sun. When a season contains four full Moons, the third is called a Blue Moon." They termed this the "Maine rule" for blue moons, as distinct from Pruett's 1946 definition that was seen to have been a misinterpretation.

In popular astronomy the Maine rule is sometimes called the "seasonal", "true" or "traditional" rule (though of course no tradition of it exists prior to 1937). Blue moons by Pruett's definition are sometimes called "calendar blue moons". The "seasonal" blue moon rule is itself ambiguous since it depends which definition of season is used. The Maine rule used seasons of equal length with the ecclesiastical equinox (March 21). An alternative is to use the astronomical seasons, which are of unequal length.

There is also reference in modern popular astrology to "zodiacal blue moons".

=== Blue moon dates ===
The table below has blue moon dates and times (UTC) calculated according to Pruett's "calendar" rule (second full moon in a calendar month) and two versions of the "seasonal" rule (third full moon in a season with four). The Maine rule uses equal-length seasons defined by the dynamical mean sun, and is presumed to have been the original rule of Trefethen. The "astro-seasonal" rule uses the unequal astronomical seasons defined by the apparent sun. All calculations are by David Harper.

The fourth column shows blue moon dates that were actually printed in the Maine Farmers' Almanac, as found by Olson, Fienberg and Sinnott in 1999. They studied issues published between 1819 and 1962, and found that all mentions occurred between 1937, when H.P. Trefethen introduced the term, and 1956, when Trefethen's editorship ended (consistent with it being Trefethen's own invention). Occasional discrepancies between the Maine rule and the almanac's printed dates can be ascribed to clerical errors or miscalculation. In one case (August 1945) Trefethen appears to have used the apparent rather than mean sun.

The table shows that in 200 years there are 187 full moons that could be called "blue" by some definition – an average of nearly one per year. Two Pruett blue moons can occur in a single year (1915, 1961, 1999, 2018, 2037, 2094). 1915 had four blue moons (two Pruett, one Maine, one astro-seasonal). 1934 and 2048 have three (one of each type).

Despite the 187 blue moons appearing across the 200 years in this table, only 146 years have any of these 3 types of blue moons, leaving 54 years (thus averaging just over 1 year in every 4) which have none of the 3 rules represented in that calendar year.

While not totally unexpected (given the overlapping frequencies of these 3 rules), it so happens there are not any 2 sequential years (at least within these 200) wherein none of the 3 types of blue moon occur.

Conversely, despite the preponderance of years with blue moons (of at least 1 type) occurring in this 200-year range, there are no instances of more than 4 sequential years having a blue moon, of any of these 3 types. In other words, at least 1 year out of every 5 sequential years has none of the 3 types appearing.

Year	Pruett rule	Maine rule	Astro-seasonal	Almanac
1901	Jul 31 at 10:35			
1902		May 22 at 10:46	May 22 at 10:46	
1904	Mar 31 at 12:45			
1905		Feb 19 at 18:52	Feb 19 at 18:52	
1906	Nov 30 at 23:07			
1907		Aug 23 at 12:15	Aug 23 at 12:15	
1909	Aug 31 at 05:06			
1910		Aug 20 at 19:14	Aug 20 at 19:14	
1912	May 30 at 23:29			
1913		Feb 21 at 02:03	May 20 at 07:18	
1915	Jan 31 at 04:42			
1915	Mar 31 at 05:36	Nov 21 at 17:36	Aug 24 at 21:40	Nov 21
1917	Sep 30 at 20:31			
1918		Aug 22 at 05:02	Aug 22 at 05:02	Aug 22
1920	Jul 30 at 23:17			
1921		May 21 at 20:15	May 21 at 20:15	May 21
1923	Apr 30 at 21:31			
1924		Feb 20 at 16:07	May 18 at 21:52	Feb 20
1925	Oct 31 at 17:15			
1926		Aug 23 at 12:38	Aug 23 at 12:38	summer
1928	Aug 31 at 02:35			
1929		May 23 at 12:50	Aug 20 at 09:42	spring
1931	May 31 at 14:31			
1932		Feb 22 at 02:07	May 20 at 05:09	winter
1933	Dec 31 at 20:53			
1934	Mar 31 at 01:15	Nov 21 at 04:26	Aug 24 at 19:37	Nov 21
1936	Sep 30 at 20:59			
1937		Aug 22 at 00:47	Aug 22 at 00:47	Aug 22
1939	Jul 31 at 06:37			
1940		May 21 at 13:33	May 21 at 13:33	May 21
1942	Apr 30 at 21:58			
1943		Feb 20 at 05:45	May 19 at 21:13	Feb 20
1944	Oct 31 at 13:36			
1945		Nov 19 at 15:13	Aug 23 at 12:03	Aug 23
1947	Aug 31 at 16:33			
1948		May 23 at 00:37	Aug 19 at 17:32	May 23
1950	May 31 at 12:44			
1951		May 21 at 05:45	May 21 at 05:45	May 21
1952	Dec 31 at 05:06			
1953		Nov 20 at 23:12	Aug 24 at 20:21	Nov 20
1955	Oct 31 at 06:03			
1956		Aug 21 at 12:38	Aug 21 at 12:38	Aug 21
1958	Jul 30 at 16:46			
1959		May 22 at 12:56	May 22 at 12:56	
1961	Jan 31 at 18:46			
1961	Apr 30 at 18:41		Nov 22 at 09:44	
1962		Feb 19 at 13:18	May 19 at 14:32	
1963	Nov 30 at 23:55			
1964		Nov 19 at 15:43	Aug 23 at 05:25	
1966	Aug 31 at 00:13			
1967		May 23 at 20:22	Aug 20 at 02:27	
1969	May 31 at 13:17			
1970		May 21 at 03:38	May 21 at 03:38	
1971	Dec 31 at 20:18			
1972		Nov 20 at 23:07	Nov 20 at 23:07	
1974	Oct 31 at 01:20			
1975		Aug 21 at 19:48	Aug 21 at 19:48	
1977	Jul 30 at 10:52			
1978		May 22 at 13:17	May 22 at 13:17	
1980	Mar 31 at 15:13			
1981		Feb 18 at 22:58	Feb 18 at 22:58	
1982	Dec 30 at 11:31			
1983		Nov 20 at 12:29	Aug 23 at 14:59	
1985	Jul 31 at 21:40			
1986		Aug 19 at 18:54	Aug 19 at 18:54	
1988	May 31 at 10:54			
1989		Feb 20 at 15:32	May 20 at 18:16	
1990	Dec 31 at 18:36			
1991		Nov 21 at 22:56	Nov 21 at 22:56	
1993	Sep 30 at 18:54			
1994		Aug 21 at 06:47	Aug 21 at 06:47	
1996	Jul 30 at 10:35			
1997		May 22 at 09:13	May 22 at 09:13	
1999	Jan 31 at 16:05			
1999	Mar 31 at 22:50			
2000		Feb 19 at 16:27	Feb 19 at 16:27	
2001	Nov 30 at 20:49			
2002		Nov 20 at 01:34	Aug 22 at 22:29	
2004	Jul 31 at 18:05			
2005		Aug 19 at 17:53	Aug 19 at 17:53	
2007	Jun 30 at 13:48			
2008		Feb 21 at 03:30	May 20 at 02:11	
2009	Dec 31 at 19:11			
2010		Nov 21 at 17:27	Nov 21 at 17:27	
2012	Aug 31 at 13:56			
2013		Aug 21 at 01:44	Aug 21 at 01:44	
2015	Jul 31 at 10:41			
2016		May 21 at 21:14	May 21 at 21:14	
2018	Jan 31 at 13:27			
2018	Mar 31 at 12:35			
2019		Feb 19 at 15:53	May 18 at 21:11	
2020	Oct 31 at 14:47			
2021		Nov 19 at 08:57	Aug 22 at 12:02	
2023	Aug 31 at 01:35			
2024		Aug 19 at 18:25	Aug 19 at 18:25	
2026	May 31 at 08:44			
2027		Feb 20 at 23:23	May 20 at 10:59	
2028	Dec 31 at 16:48			
2029		Nov 21 at 04:02	Aug 24 at 01:51	
2031	Sep 30 at 18:56			
2032		Aug 21 at 01:46	Aug 21 at 01:46	
2034	Jul 31 at 05:54			
2035		May 22 at 04:25	May 22 at 04:25	
2037	Jan 31 at 14:01			
2037	Mar 31 at 09:53			
2038		Feb 19 at 16:09	May 18 at 18:23	
2039	Oct 31 at 22:36			
2040		Nov 18 at 19:05	Aug 22 at 09:09	
2042	Aug 31 at 01:59			
2043		Aug 20 at 15:04	Aug 20 at 15:04	
2045	May 30 at 17:51			
2046		May 20 at 03:15	May 20 at 03:15	
2048	Jan 31 at 00:13	Nov 20 at 11:19	Aug 23 at 18:06	
2050	Sep 30 at 17:31			
2051		Aug 22 at 01:34	Aug 22 at 01:34	
2053	Jul 30 at 17:03			
2054		May 21 at 15:16	May 21 at 15:16	
2056	Mar 31 at 10:22			
2057		Feb 19 at 11:56	May 18 at 19:02	
2058	Oct 31 at 12:51			
2059		Nov 19 at 13:09	Aug 23 at 09:41	
2061	Aug 30 at 22:17			
2062		Aug 20 at 03:55	Aug 20 at 03:55	
2064	May 30 at 10:34			
2065		May 20 at 02:05	May 20 at 02:05	
2066	Dec 31 at 14:40			
2067	Mar 30 at 20:07	Nov 20 at 23:49	Nov 20 at 23:49	
2069	Sep 30 at 18:06			
2070		Aug 21 at 19:53	Aug 21 at 19:53	
2072	May 31 at 22:15			
2073		May 21 at 10:02	May 21 at 10:02	
2075	Apr 30 at 18:35			
2076		Feb 19 at 23:48	May 18 at 17:38	
2077	Oct 31 at 10:36			
2078		Nov 19 at 12:52	Aug 23 at 08:11	
2080	Jul 31 at 19:12			
2081		Aug 19 at 11:15	Aug 19 at 11:15	
2083	May 31 at 09:41			
2084		May 20 at 02:36	May 20 at 02:36	
2085	Dec 30 at 23:57			
2086		Nov 20 at 20:12	Nov 20 at 20:12	
2088	Sep 30 at 15:25			
2089		Aug 21 at 06:15	Aug 21 at 06:15	
2091	Jul 30 at 11:58			
2092		May 21 at 10:00	May 21 at 10:00	
2094	Jan 31 at 12:35			
2094	Apr 30 at 13:54			
2095		Feb 19 at 06:59	May 19 at 09:21	
2096	Oct 31 at 11:13			
2097		Nov 19 at 13:03	Aug 22 at 23:52	
2099	Aug 30 at 17:55			
2100		Aug 19 at 21:29	Aug 19 at 21:29	

=== Remarks ===
One lunation (an average lunar cycle) is 29.53 days. There are about 365.24 days in a tropical year. Therefore, about 12.37 lunations (365.24 days divided by 29.53 days) occur in a tropical year. So the date of the full moon falls back by nearly one day every calendar month on average. Each calendar year contains roughly 11 days more than the number of days in 12 lunar cycles, so every two or three years (seven times in the 19 year Metonic cycle), there is an extra full moon in the year. The extra full moon necessarily falls in one of the four seasons (however defined), giving that season four full moons instead of the usual three.

Given that a year is approximately 365.2425 days and a synodic orbit is 29.5309 days, then there are about 12.368 synodic months in a year. For this to add up to another full month would take 1/0.368 years. Thus it would take about 2.716 years, or 2 years, 8 months, and 18 days for another Pruett blue moon to occur. Or approximately once in 32.5 months on an average.

When there are two Pruett blue moons in a single year, the first occurs in January and the second in March or April, and there is no full moon in February.

The next time New Year's Eve falls on a Pruett blue moon (as occurred on December 31, 2009, in time zones west of UTC+05) is after one Metonic cycle, in 2028 in time zones west of UTC+08. At that time there will be a total lunar eclipse.

== See also ==
- Black moon
- Blood moon – reddish color a totally eclipsed Moon takes on to observers on Earth
- Wet moon – Horizontal (bowl appearance) crescent
- Super moon – Full or new moon which appears larger
- Adhika-masa

== List of blue moons from 1991 to 2052 ==
=== Specific months ===
- December 1991
- September 1993
- July 1996
- January and March 1999
- November 2001
- July 2004
- June 2007
- December 2009
- August 2012
- July 2015
- January and March 2018
- October 2020
- August 2023
- May 2026
- December 2028
- September 2031
- July 2034
- January and March 2037
- October 2039
- August 2044
- September 2047
- May 2052
