= Blue sun =

Solar phenomenon

The Sun may appear blue after volcanic eruptions or major forest fires. This is typically due to scattering by aerosol particles. Normal Rayleigh scattering is caused by particles much smaller than the wavelength of visible light. The scattering which causes the blue sun appearance is due to larger particles whose size is similar to the wavelength of light.

== See also ==
- Blue moon – a similar phenomenon affecting the Moon
- Green flash – a phenomenon at sunset, when the last edge of the sun may flash green or even blue
