= New moon =

First lunar phase, the definition varies

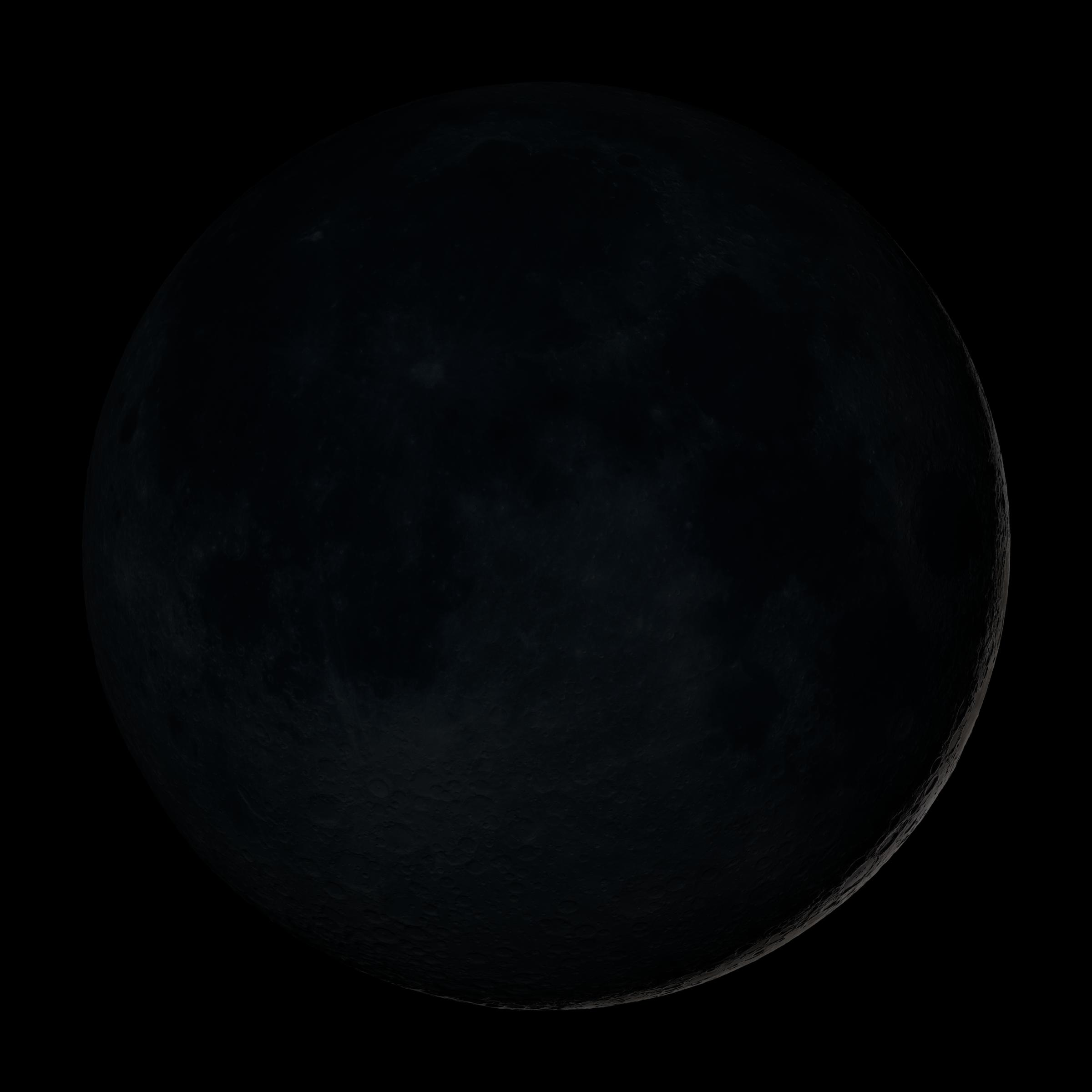
A simulated image of the traditionally defined new Moon: the earliest visible waxing crescent (lower right), which signals the start of a new month in many lunar and lunisolar calendars. At new moon, mostly earthlight illuminates the near side of the Moon. (Note: Planetlight, zodiacal light, and starlight contribute a negligible amount of the total light that the lunar surface reflects.)

As the Earth revolves around the Sun, approximate axial parallelism of the Moon's orbital plane (tilted five degrees to the Earth's orbital plane) results in the revolution of the lunar nodes relative to the Earth. This causes an eclipse season approximately every six months, in which a solar eclipse can occur at the new moon phase.

In astronomy, the new moon is the first lunar phase, when the Moon and Sun have the same ecliptic longitude. At this phase, the lunar disk is not visible to the naked eye, except when it is silhouetted against the Sun during a solar eclipse.

The original meaning of the term 'new moon', which is still sometimes used in calendrical, non-astronomical contexts, is the first visible crescent of the Moon after conjunction with the Sun. This thin waxing crescent is briefly and faintly visible as the Moon gets lower in the western sky after sunset, with the smallest arc angle possible around 5–7°. The precise time and even the date of the appearance of the new moon by this definition will be influenced by the geographical location of the observer. The first crescent marks the beginning of the month in the Islamic calendar and in some lunisolar calendars such as the Hebrew calendar. In the Chinese calendar, the beginning of the month is marked by the last visible crescent of a waning Moon.

The astronomical new moon occurs by definition at the moment of conjunction in ecliptical longitude with the Sun when the Moon is invisible from the Earth. This moment is unique and does not depend on location (because the ecliptic coordinate system is usually defined relative to the center of the Earth), and in certain circumstances, it coincides with a solar eclipse.

A lunation, or synodic month, is the period from one new moon to the next. At the J2000.0 epoch, the average length of a lunation is 29.53059 days (or 29 days, 12 hours, 44 minutes, and 3 seconds). However, the length of any one synodic month can vary from 29.26 to 29.80 days (12.96 hours) due to the perturbing effects of the Sun's gravity on the Moon's eccentric orbit.

== Lunation number ==
The Lunation Number or Lunation Cycle is a number given to each lunation beginning from a specific one in history. Several conventions are in use.

Lunation Number systems
System	Used by	Definition	Relation to LN
Brown Lunation Number (BLN)	Historically most commonly used	Lunation 1 began at the first new moon of 1923, the year when Brown's lunar theory was introduced in the American Ephemeris and Nautical Almanac. Lunation 1 occurred at approximately 02:41 UTC, 17 January 1923. With later refinements, the BLN was used in almanacs until 1983.	BLN = LN + 953
Lunation Number (LN) (Note: [sic], not MLN)	Introduced by Jean Meeus in 1998	Lunation 0 began on the first new moon of 2000 (approx. 18:14 UTC, 6 January 2000).	—
Goldstine Lunation Number (GLN)	Herman Goldstine	Lunation 0 began on 11 January 1001 BCE	GLN = LN + 37105.
Hebrew Lunation Number (HLN)	Hebrew calendar	Lunation 1 began on 6 October 3761 BCE.	HLN = LN + 71234.
Islamic Lunation Number (ILN)	Islamic Calendar	Lunation 1 began on the first day of the month of Muharram, which occurred in 622 CE (15 July, Julian, in the proleptic reckoning).	ILN = LN + 17038.
Thai Lunation Number (TLN) ( "มาสเกณฑ์" (Maasa-Kendha))	Myanmar (alongside the Gregorian calendar)	Lunation 0 as the beginning of Burmese era of the Buddhist calendar on Sunday, 22 March 638 CE.	TLN = LN + 16843.

== Lunisolar calendars ==
=== Hebrew calendar ===
The new moon, in Hebrew Rosh Chodesh, signifies the start of every Hebrew month and is considered an important date and minor holiday in the Hebrew calendar. The modern form of the calendar practiced in Judaism is a rule-based lunisolar calendar, akin to the Chinese calendar, measuring months defined in lunar cycles as well as years measured in solar cycles, and distinct from the purely lunar Islamic calendar and the predominantly solar Gregorian calendar. The Jewish months are fixed to the annual seasons by setting the new moon of Aviv, the barley ripening, or spring, as the first moon and head of the year. Since the Babylonian captivity, this month is called Nisan, and it is calculated based on mathematical rules designed to ensure that festivals are observed in their traditional season. Passover always falls in the springtime. This fixed lunisolar calendar follows rules introduced by Hillel II and refined until the ninth century. This calculation makes use of a mean lunation length used by Ptolemy and handed down from Babylonians, which is still very accurate: ca. 29.530594 days vs. a present value (see below) of 29.530589 days. This difference of only 0.000005, or five millionths of a day, adds up to about only four hours since Babylonian times.

=== Chinese calendar ===
The new moon is the beginning of the month in the Chinese calendar. Some Buddhist Chinese keep a vegetarian diet on the new moon and full moon each month.

=== Hindu calendar ===
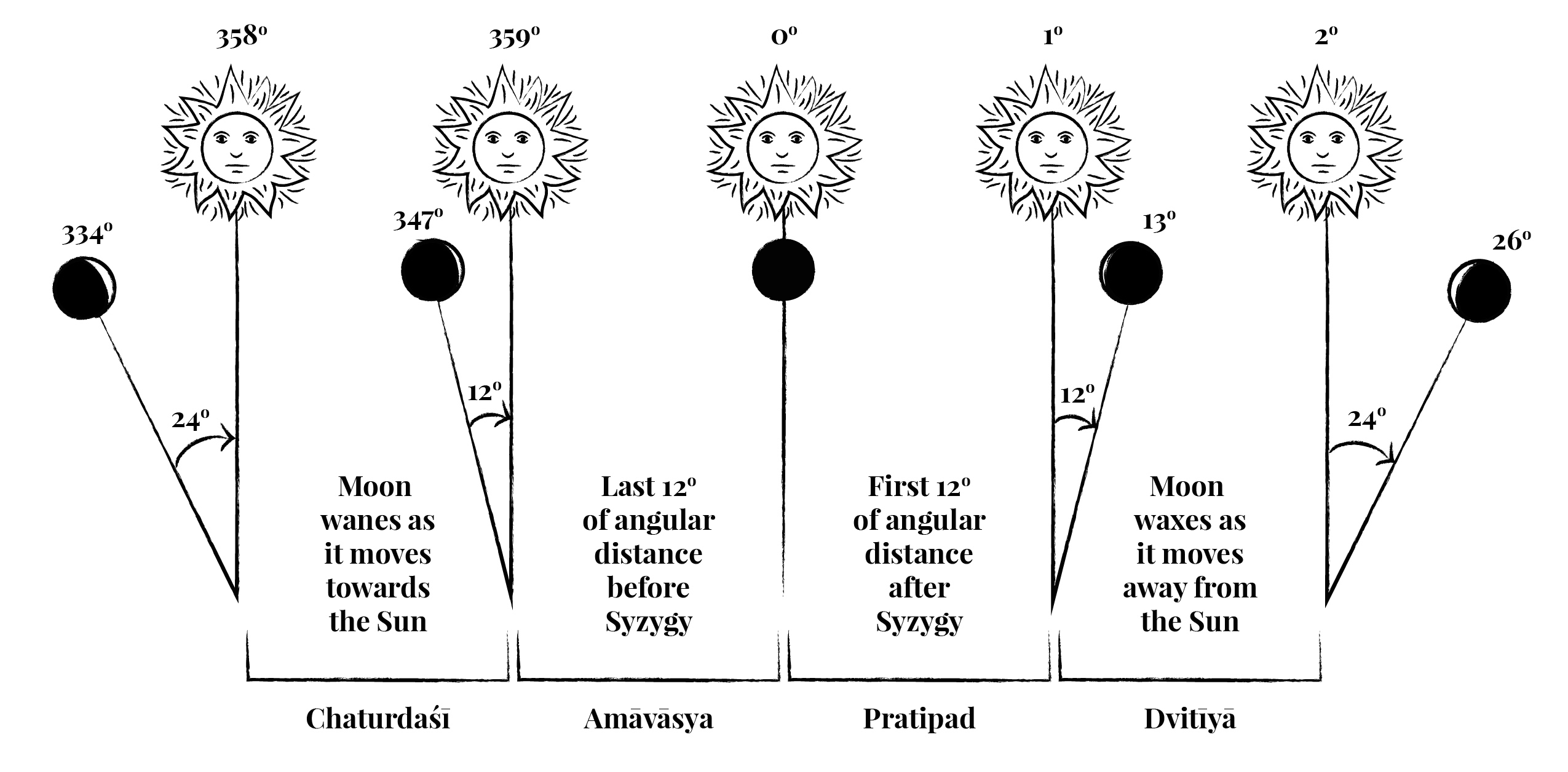
Amavasya and Prathama tithi

The new moon is significant in the lunar Hindu calendar. The first day of the calendar starts the day after the dark moon phase (Amavasya).

There are fifteen moon dates for each of the waxing and waning periods. These fifteen dates are divided evenly into five categories: Nanda, Bhadra', Jaya, Rikta, and Purna, which are cycled through in that order. Nanda dates are considered to be favorable for auspicious works; Bhadra dates for works related to community, social, family, and friends; and Jaya dates for dealing with conflict. Rikta dates are considered beneficial only for works related to cruelty. Purna dates are considered to be favorable for all work.

== Lunar calendars ==
=== Islamic calendar ===
The lunar Hijri calendar (known in the West as the Islamic calendar) has exactly 12 lunar months in a year of 354 or 355 days. Each month begins on the evening of the first visible crescent of the new moon. Muslims have largely retained the principle of determinaton by actual observation. This makes it impossible to predict with certainty when any specific month will begin (in particular, the exact date on which the month of Ramadan will begin is not known in advance). Furthermore, the moment varies around the world by as much as a day, according to longitude. In Pakistan, there is a "Central Ruet-e-Hilal Committee" whose head is Mufti Muneeb-ur-Rehman, assisted by 150 observatories of the Pakistan Meteorological Department, which announces the sighting of the new moon.

The Umm al-Qura calendar developed in Saudi Arabia uses astronomical calculations to precisely predict the evening of first visible crescent at Mecca (independently of weather conditions) and is used there for some civil calendar uses. In 2007, the Fiqh Council of North America and the European Council for Fatwa and Research announced that they had formally adopted this calendar and expressed a wish to unify Muslims on this standard. The calculation requires that conjunction must occur before sunset in Mecca and that, on the same evening, the moonset must take place after sunset. These can be precisely calculated and therefore a unified calendar is possible should it become adopted worldwide.

== Solar calendars holding moveable feasts ==
=== Baháʼí calendar ===
The Baháʼí calendar is a solar calendar with certain new moons observed as moveable feasts. In the Baháʼí Faith, effective from 2015 onwards, the "Twin Holy Birthdays", refer to two successive holy days in the Baháʼí calendar (the birth of the Báb and the birth of Bahá'u'lláh), will be observed on the first and the second day following the occurrence of the eighth new moon after Naw-Rúz (Baháʼí New Year), as determined in advance by astronomical tables using Tehran as the point of reference. This will result in the observance of the Twin Birthdays moving, year to year, from mid-October to mid-November according to the Gregorian calendar.

=== Christian liturgical calendar ===
Easter, the most important feast in the Christian liturgical calendar, is a movable feast. The date of Easter is determined by reference to the ecclesiastical full moon, which, being historically difficult to determine with precision, is defined as being fourteen days after the (first crescent) new moon.

== See also ==
- Black moon
- Blue moon – any one of three unconnected events: either a second full moon in a calendar month, the third full moon in a season containing four, or a moon that appears blue due to atmospheric effects)
- Dark moon – Last visible crescent of waning moon
- Hilal (crescent moon) – First observation of a new moon
- Islamic New Year – Beginning of a new lunar Hijri year
- Lunar phase – Shape of the Moon's sunlit portion as viewed from Earth
- Solar eclipse – Event wherein the Sun is obscured by the Moon
- Wet moon – Horizontal (bowl appearance) crescent
