= List of Inuyasha chapters (1–198) =

First tankōbon volume cover, released by Shogakukan on April 18, 1997

The chapters of the Inuyasha manga series were written and illustrated by Rumiko Takahashi. The manga was serialized in Shogakukan's shōnen manga magazine Weekly Shōnen Sunday from 1996 to 2008. Chapters 1–198 were collected in 20 tankōbon volumes released from April 18, 1997, to March 17, 2001.

In North America, Inuyasha has been licensed for English language release by Viz Media, initially titled as Inu-Yasha. They began publishing the manga in April 1997 in an American comic book format, each issue containing two or three chapters from the original manga, and the last issue was released in February 2003, which covered up until the original Japanese 14th volume.

Viz Media began publishing the series in a first trade-paperback edition, with 12 volumes published from July 6, 1998, to October 6, 2002. A second edition began with the 13th volume, released on April 9, 2003, and the first 12 volumes, following this edition, were reprinted as well. The 20th volume was released on January 4, 2005.

== Volumes ==
No.	Title	Original release date	English release date
1	Turning Back Time	April 18, 1997; 4-09-125201-X	July 6, 1998 (1st ed.); April 9, 2003 (2nd ed.); 978-1-56931-262-9 (1st ed.); 978-1-56931-947-5 (2nd ed.)
001. "The Accursed Youth" (封印された少年, "Fūinsareta Shōnen"); 002. "Inu-Yasha Resurrected" (甦る犬夜叉, "Yomigaeru Inuyasha"); 003. "A New Foe" (玉を狙う者, "Tama o Nerau Mono"); 004. "The Dancing Dead" (屍舞烏, "Shibu Garasu"); 005. "Kagome's Arrow" (かごめの矢, "Kagome no Ya"); 006. "Yura of the Hair" (逆髪の結羅, "Sakasagami no Yura"); 007. "The Bone-Eater's Well" (骨食いの井戸, "Honekui no Ido"); 008. "The Return Home" (帰還, "Kikan")
15-year-old high school student Kagome Higurashi is dragged into the Bone Eater's Well by Mistress Centipede, an insect-demon. She travels back to the past, and reveals to be an reincarnation of the priestess Kikyo, with the sacred Shikon Jewel reborn inside her body. When Mistress Centipede removes the jewel, Kagome awakes the half-demon Inuyasha who was sealed 50 years ago by Kikyo. Inuyasha kills Mistress Centipede. Kikyo's sister, Kaede binds Inuyasha with a necklace and Kagome keeps him under control. When the raven demon steals the jewel, Kagome shoots the crow with an arrow and shatters the jewel into hundreds of shards scattering across Japan. Demon Yura of the Hair steals a jewel shard, and Kagome falls down the well and back to her time. Inuyasha goes through the well to the modern era, followed by Yura. Kagome returns with Inuyasha to his time to stop Yura.
2	Family Matters	June 18, 1997; 4-09-125202-8	December 6, 1998 (1st ed.); April 9, 2003 (2nd ed.); 978-1-56931-298-8 (1st ed.); 978-1-56931-948-2 (2nd ed.)
009. "Yura's Web" (結羅の巣, "Yura no Su"); 010. "Dilemma" (窮地, "Kyūchi"); 011. "Soul Transfer" (魂移し, "Tama Utsushi"); 012. "Half Breed" (半妖, "Han'yō"); 013. "A Mother's Face" (母の顔, "Haha no Kao"); 014. "The Nothing Woman" (無女, "Mu Onna"); 015. "The Black Pearl" (黒真珠, "Kuro Shinju"); 016. "The Fang of Steel" (鉄砕牙, "Tessaiga"); 017. "The Transformation" (変化, "Henge"); 018. "Legacy" (形見, "Katami")
Back in the feudal era, Kagome kills Yura, breaking the red skull from the hair strands. Meanwhile, Inuyasha's half brother Sesshomaru and his subordinate Jaken search for the grave of The Great Dog Demon, Inuyasha and Sesshomaru's father, and the heirloom sword Tetsusaiga within the grave. Inuyasha sees a vision of his mother, knowing Sesshomaru has resurrected Izayoi and is holding her hostage. Kagome destroys the illusion, but Sesshomaru deduces that a portal to the grave is in one of Inuyasha's eyes, which he extracts it. Sesshomaru, Jaken, Inuyasha and Kagome enter the portal, and discover Tetsusaiga inside The Great Dog Demon's grave. Since Sesshomaru cannot disable the magical shield within Tetsusaiga, Kagome removes it from the stone. Inuyasha defeats Sesshomaru, forcing him to retreat.
3	Good Intentions	October 18, 1997; 4-09-125203-6	May 6, 1999 (1st ed.); July 9, 2003 (2nd ed.); 978-1-56931-340-4 (1st ed.); 978-1-56931-960-4 (2nd ed.)
019. "The Dark Castle" (物の怪の城, "Mono no Ke no Shiro"); 020. "Tsukomo No Gama" (九十九の蝦蟇, "Tsukumo no Gama"); 021. "Inheritance of Souls" (残された心, "Nokosareta Kokoro"); 022. "Plea for Mercy" (命乞い, "Inochi Goi"); 023. "Mask of Flesh" (肉づきの面, "Nikutsuki no Men"); 024. "The Broken Body" (壊れた体, "Kowareta Karada"); 025. "Face Off" (人を喰う面, "Hito o Kū Men"); 026. "I'll Help You, But ..." (助けてやるが・・・, "Tasukete yaru ga ..."); 027. "Half a Demon is Worse than One" (片割れ, "Kataware"); 028. "FoxFire" (狐火, "Kitsunebi")
Inuyasha and Kagome meet Takeda Nobunaga on his way to rescue Princess Tsuyu, whose husband's soldiers had kidnapped young women. Inuyasha and Kagome kill the demon to free the women from the eggs. In the modern times, a woman approaches the Higurashi shrine to have a flesh-eating Noh mask exorcised, but the mask escapes and takes over her body. Because the mask's body disintegrates, it tries to compensate by killing anyone. When the mask attacks Kagome, Sota summons Inuyasha from the well and he destroys the mask. Back in the feudal era, a fox demon named Shippo steals the jewel shards, seeking revenge on the Thunder Brothers Hiten and Manten for his father's death. Manten senses that Shippo has some shards.
4	Lost and Alone	December 10, 1997; 4-09-125204-4	May 6, 1999 (1st ed.); July 9, 2003 (2nd ed.); 978-1-56931-368-8 (1st ed.); 978-1-56931-961-1 (2nd ed.)
029. "The Thunder Brothers" (雷獣兄弟, "Raijū Kyōdai"); 030. "The Crush" (惚れた女, "Horeta Onna"); 031. "Kagome's Last Hope" (かごめの策, "Kagome no Saku"); 032. "The Power to Devour" (妖力を喰う, "Yōryoku o Kū"); 033. "With only a Scabbard" (鞘を捨てる, "Saya o Suteru"); 034. "The Cry" (鞘が呼ぶ, "Saya ga Yobu"); 035. "A Little Imp" (小さな悪霊, "Chiisana Akuryō"); 036. "Until my Eyes Open" (目が開くまで・・・, "Me ga aku made ..."); 037. "To Hell" (地獄へ, "Jigoku he"); 038. "To Rest" (魂鎮め, "Tamashizume")
Manten plans to kill Kagome for the hair-potion. When Hiten fuses with Manten, Inuyasha kills him. While Tetsusaiga's scabbard is being repaired, Kagome returns to the present day. A girl's ghost threatens anyone. The girl, Mayu, died in a fire, and blamed her mother for abandoning her. Inuyasha stops Mayu from killing her brother and Kagome. When the soul piper demon tries to drag Mayu to Hell to become an evil spirit, Inuyasha and Kagome head to the apartment. Kagome grabs Mayu from the brink of Hell, telling her to reconcile with her mother. Mayu agrees and the demon releases her. After forgiving her mother, Mayu goes to Heaven.
5	Flesh and Bone	March 18, 1998; 4-09-125205-2	January 5, 2000 (1st ed.); October 1, 2003 (2nd ed.); 978-1-56931-433-3 (1st ed.); 978-1-59116-052-6 (2nd ed.)
039. "Spider Head" (蜘蛛頭, "Kumogashira"); 040. "New Moon" (新月, "Shingetsu"); 041. "The Spider's Web" (蜘蛛の巣, "Kumo no Su"); 042. "Inside the Aura" (結界の中, "Kekkai no Naka"); 043. "The Demon Reborn" (犬夜叉復活！, "Inuyasha Fukkatsu"); 044. "Where the Shards Are" (かけらのありか, "Kakera no Arika"); 045. "Earth and Bones" (骨と土, "Hone to Tsuchi"); 046. "Empty Shell" (抜け殻, "Nukegara"); 047. "Resistance" (拒絶, "Kyozetsu"); 048. "Betrayal" (裏切り, "Uragiri")
While staying in a temple, Inuyasha, Kagome, Shippo and Myōga are attacked by spider-heads. The night of the new moon temporarily strips Inuyasha of his demonic powers, while the group escapes. Inuyasha resists the venom, regains his demon strength at sunrise and kills the demon. Meanwhile, the ogress Urasue robs and uses Kikyo's remains to create a clay doll, attempting to resurrect her. Realizing that Kikyo's soul was reincarnated, Urasue kidnaps Kagome. She removes her soul, when Inuyasha utters Kikyo's name. Revived in the clay body, Kikyo kills Urasue and blames Inuyasha for her death.
6	Wounded Souls	May 18, 1998; 4-09-125206-0	May 1, 2000 (1st ed.); October 1, 2003 (2nd ed.); 978-1-56931-491-3 (1st ed.); 978-1-59116-053-3 (2nd ed.)
049. "Hatred Unspent" (怨念, "Onnen"); 050. "A Soul Asunder" (引き裂かれた魂, "Hiki Sakareta Tamashii"); 051. "Monk on the Make" (不良法師, "Furyō Hōshi"); 052. "Jewel Thief" (玉泥棒, "Tama Dorobō"); 053. "Wind to Nowhere" (風穴, "Kaza-ana"); 054. "The Cursed Hand" (呪われた手, "Norowareta Te"); 055. "The Monster Within" (懐中の鬼, "Kaichū no Oni"); 056. "The Master Painter" (鬼を操る, "Oni o Ayatsuru"); 057. "The Artist's Dream" (絵師の夢, "Eshi no Yume"); 058. "Tainted Ink" (汚れた墨, "Kegareta Sumi")
Kikyo leaves Inuyasha, when Kagome recovers her soul. Miroku, a lecherous monk, recruits Hachiemon, a tanuki demon, to help him steal the shard. When Inuyasha and Kagome find him in a town, they run to the outskirts to avoid endangering the townspeople. Miroku uses his wind tunnel against Inuyasha, who is saved when Kagome leaps between them. Miroku identifies Naraku as Kikyo's killer. They plan to find Naraku and collect the jewel shards. An artist is creating demons from his paintings of Hell, drawn with a jewel shard with the ink. When he gets a cut and spills ink, it dissolves him and Kagome purifies the jewel shard.
7	Close Enemies	August 8, 1998; 4-09-125207-9	October 30, 2000 (1st ed.); December 24, 2003 (2nd ed.); 978-1-56931-539-2 (1st ed.); 978-1-59116-114-1 (2nd ed.)
059. "A Matter of Arms" (仮の腕, "Kari no Ude"); 060. "The Power of the Wolf's Fang" (鉄砕牙の威力, "Tessaiga no Iryoku"); 061. "The Sting of Victory" (最猛勝, "Saimyōshō"); 062. "Arm Robbery" (腕を奪う, "Ude o Ubau"); 063. "Reclamation" (奪還, "Dakkan"); 064. "Separate Ways" (別れ, "Wakare"); 065. "The Spider's Lair" (鬼蜘蛛, "Onigumo"); 066. "The Shadow of Evil" (邪気の跡, "Jaki no Ato"); 067. "When We are Two" (ふたつの時, "Futatsu no Toki"); 068. "The Pierced Wall" (破られた結界, "Yaburareta Kekkai")
To replace the arm removed by Inuyasha, Naraku offers Sesshomaru a new one with a jewel shard, claiming it will allow him to wield Tetsusaiga. Sesshomaru unsuccessfully touches Tetsusaiga with his new arm, and summons a giant demon whom Miroku killed. Inuyasha removes Sesshomaru's arm and retrieves Tetsusaiga. Sesshomaru flees and removes the arm, when it betrays him. When Naraku explains about the jewel shard, Sesshomaru decides to kill Naraku. Fearing for Kagome's safety, Inuyasha takes away the jewel shard and sends her back to the well, trapping her in modern times by blockading it. Inuyasha fights off the hell-wolf Royakan, to whom Naraku gives a jewel shard and a plant.
8	Stolen Spirit	November 18, 1998; 4-09-125208-7	July 6, 2001 (1st ed.); December 24, 2003 (2nd ed.); 978-1-56931-553-8 (1st ed.); 978-1-59116-115-8 (2nd ed.)
069. "Sensing Presences" (気配, "Kehai"); 070. "Reunion" (再会, "Saikai"); 071. "Naraku" (奈落, "Naraku"); 072. "The Mark" (目印, "Mejirushi"); 073. "Young Souls" (死魂, "Shinidama"); 074. "The Soul Past Saving" (救われぬ魂, "Sukuwarenu Tamashii"); 075. "Kikyo's Shield" (桔梗の結界, "Kikyō no Kekkai"); 076. "The Smell of Death" (死の匂い, "Shi no Nioi"); 077. "Kagome's Voice" (かごめの声, "Kagome no Koe"); 078. "A Gentle Scent" (やさしい匂い, "Yasashī Nioi")
Shippo goes to the bottom of the well with a shard, and Kagome returns to the feudal era. Energized by her nearby scent, Inuyasha spares Royakan. After Inuyasha spots him spying nearby, Naraku describes his origin from the fusion of Onigumo with a horde of demons, and admits tricking Inuyasha and Kikyo into hating each other. As Naraku escapes, Kagome removes the jewel shard from Royakan, and he reverts into a friendly demon. Inuyasha hears of Kikyo's location this searches for her. Kagome finds Kikyo, before she binds her with a concealment spell. When Inuyasha confronts Kikyo about stealing souls, Kikyo tries to drag him down with her to Hell. However, Kagome unconsciously pulls her detached soul fragment and Kikyo forcefully leaves Inuyasha.
9	Building a Better Trap	January 18, 1999; 4-09-125209-5	October 10, 2001 (1st ed.); April 7, 2004 (2nd ed.); 978-1-56931-643-6 (1st ed.); 978-1-59116-236-0 (2nd ed.)
079. "The Fruits of Evil" (人面果, "Ninmenka"); 080. "The Secret Garden" (箱庭, "Hako Niwa"); 081. "Stomach Trouble" (腹中の光, "Fukuchū no Hikari"); 082. "The Night Kitchen" (桃果人の厨房, "Tōkajin no Chūbō"); 083. "Peach Man's Nectar" (仙人の薬, "Sennin no Kusuri"); 084. "The Enchanted Bow" (変化の弓, "Henge no Yumi"); 085. "The Soul of a Demon" (犬夜叉の心, "Inuyasha no Kokoro"); 086. "The Exterminators" (退治屋, "Taijiya"); 087. "The Ambush" (罠, "Wana"); 088. "Within the Fort" (砦の中, "Toride no Naka")
The "Peach Man" Tokajin lives on a mountainside and eats both people and peaches. A riverside tree consumes the leftovers and bears fruits resembling human heads, which Inuyasha's group find floating downstream. Inuyasha goes ahead, hoping to finish before the night of the new moon. Tokajin steals Tetsusaiga and traps Inuyasha. The others fall and get shrunk into small sizes in the tiny magical garden. Inside Tokajin's stomach, Inuyasha loses his powers, but stabs it to be vomited out. He regains his full size, but awakes entangled in a thorn bush as Tokajin plans to pickle him. Tokajin removes Kagome from the garden. Miroku and Shippo escape by hanging onto Tokajin's sleeve, and Inuyasha frees himself. Inuyasha reunites with Kagome, and find Tokajin's mentor, a sage regretting his actions, but is powerless to stop him since he has been converted to a plant. Tokajin acquired his mentor's powers by eating him, except for the secret of longevity which is why he preserved his head. The mentor transforms into a bow and Kagome shoots a sacred arrow at Tokajin. The arrow removes a jewel shard from Tokajin, whom Inuyasha tackles out through the window. Tokajin falls to his death and Inuyasha survives. Sango kills a demon and takes the jewel shard as payment. Inuyasha's group hears of this and goes looking for her. Naraku uses Sango's brother Kohaku to kill their relatives as they exterminate a demon, and sends the demons to kill the rest of Sango's village and take the jewel shards. When Sango survives, Naraku tricks her into blaming Inuyasha.
10	A Warrior's Code	April 17, 1999; 4-09-125210-9	January 9, 2002 (1st ed.); April 7, 2004 (2nd ed.); 978-1-56931-703-7 (1st ed.); 978-1-59116-237-7 (2nd ed.)
089. "The Mummy" (木乃伊, "Mīra"); 090. "Vengeance" (仇, "Kataki"); 091. "Suspicions" (疑惑, "Giwaku"); 092. "Strategies" (謀略, "Bōryaku"); 093. "Golem" (傀儡, "Kugutsu"); 094. "The Birth of the Jewel" (玉の誕生, "Tama no Tanjō"); 095. "The Water God" (水神, "Suijin"); 096. "The Holy Relic" (神器, "Jingi"); 097. "The God's Truth" (神の正体, "Kami no Shōtai"); 098. "The True God" (本物の水神, "Honmono no Suijin")
Seeking revenge and suffering injuries, Sango forcefully attacks Inuyasha. During the battle, Naraku steals the jewel shard and flees, but partially reveals his demonic nature, distrusting him. Sango sends Kirara after him. She faints and awakens, while being carried by Inuyasha, as he chases Naraku. Sango joins the group as the best way to find Naraku for revenge. A village headman's son pays Inuyasha's group to destroy a water god who has been demanding the village boys for sacrifice. The god's attendants are brushed aside, but the god himself is armed with the Amakoi Halberd which is stronger than Tetsusaiga. The water sprites tell Miroku that the true water goddess is sealed in a cave, and Miroku and Sango free her as Inuyasha fights the impostor.
11	Scars of the Past	July 17, 1999; 4-09-125581-7	July 6, 2002 (1st ed.); June 23, 2004 (2nd ed.); 978-1-59116-022-9 (1st ed.); 978-1-59116-332-9 (2nd ed.)
099. "The Typhoon" (竜巻, "Tatsumaki"); 100. "The Slaying of the Snake" (大蛇成敗, "Daija Seibai"); 101. "The Wound and the Wind" (風穴の傷, "Kaza-ana no Kizu"); 102. "The Temple of Innocence" (夢心の寺, "Mushin no Tera"); 103. "To the Rescue" (弥勒救出, "Miroku Kyūshutsu"); 104. "Urn Grubs" (蠱壺虫, "Kokochū"); 105. "The Span of a Life" (弥勒の寿命, "Miroku no Jumyō"); 106. "Kohaku" (琥珀, "Kohaku"); 107. "New Life" (琥珀の命, "Kohaku no Inochi"); 108. "Sango's Betrayal" (珊瑚の裏切り, "Sango no Uragiri")
The real god opens the waters and Inuyasha kills the impostor. Miroku secretly leaves the group to visit his foster father, Mushin. Naraku hears this and sends a demon puppet to lead the rest of Inuyasha's group away from Miroku. An urn grub possesses Mushin and ambushes Miroku during surgery. Miroku escapes to his father's grave site, besieged by demons. Inuyasha and the others stop the demon, and save Mushin. Mushin repairs Miroku's hand, but the wind tunnel gets widened. Concerned by Inuyasha's increasing power, Naraku resurrects Kohaku with a jewel shard and sends him to destroy the village. Sango follows Kohaku near Naraku, who threatens to destroy Kohaku unless she brings him Tetsusaiga. To prevent Kohaku from removing the jewel shard, Sango forcefully steals Tetsusaiga and takes it to Naraku.
12	Trials and Traps	September 18, 1999; 4-09-125582-5	October 6, 2002 (1st ed.); June 30, 2004 (2nd ed.); 978-1-59116-023-6 (1st ed.); 978-1-59116-333-6 (2nd ed.)
109. "Naraku's Castle" (奈落の城, "Naraku no Shiro"); 110. "The Vapors" (瘴気, "Shōki"); 111. "Purification" (浄化, "Jōka"); 112. "The Earth Boy" (地念児, "Jinenji"); 113. "The Raid" (襲撃, "Shūgeki"); 114. "The Half-Breed's Heart" (半妖の思い, "Han'yō no Omoi"); 115. "The Belonging Place" (居場所, "Ibasho"); 116. "The Cave of Evil" (邪気の穴, "Jaki no Ana"); 117. "Fulfillment" (満願, "Mangan"); 118. "Poison" (蠱毒, "Kodoku")
Naraku orders Kohaku to kill Sango, who tries to restrain him instead of resisting. Kagome attempts to purify the shard, but Kohaku and Naraku escape. Inuyasha and Kagome leave Kirara, Sango, Miroku and Shippo, to get antidote herbs. They find that a half-demon named Jinenji is falsely accused of killing the villagers. Kagome stays with him and his mother to protect them from the villagers, while Inuyasha searches for the real culprit. When the real man-eating demon and its offspring also attack, Kagome wounds it with an arrow, but is knocked down. Jinenji saves her by punching the man-eater in the mouth and grappling with it. Inuyasha returns and kills the demon's offspring, while Jinenji rips the parent demon apart. Jinenji gives healing herbs to the villagers, who help repair the field. Inuyasha's group finds a pit where hundreds of demons are trapped together by Naraku's spells, and are fusing into a composite "imp" intended to become Naraku's new body. Miroku warns Inuyasha not to kill it, lest he become absorbed into the composite. Kikyo arrives to investigate the pit's evil aura and falls in.
13	The Mind's Eye	November 18, 1999; 4-09-125583-3	April 9, 2003; 978-1-56931-808-9
119. "Kikyo's Arrow" (桔梗の矢, "Kikyō no Ya"); 120. "Where is the Imp?" (蠱毒の行方, "Kodoku no Yukue"); 121. "Kikyo Captured" (囚われた桔梗, "Torawareta Kikyō"); 122. "Death by Illusion" (幻影殺, "Gen'eisatsu"); 123. "Death Wish" (殺意, "Satsui"); 124. "Naraku's True Form" (奈落の正体, "Naraku no Shōtai"); 125. "Toto-Sai, the Swordsmith" (刀々斎, "Tōtōsai"); 126. "Tenseiga" (天生牙, "Tenseiga"); 127. "Scar of the Wind" (風の傷, "Kaze no Kizu"); 128. "The Invisible Path" (見えない軌道, "Mienai Kidō")
As Inuyasha fights the imp, Kagome jumps into the pit alone to save Kikyo and Inuyasha. Saying that Kagome's actions are more likely to make Inuyasha lose his reason instead, Kikyo shoots an arrow to break Naraku's spell and free the imp from the pit. Pursued by Kikyo, Inuyasha and Kagome, the imp escapes and attacks Naraku for imprisoning it, but he absorbs it for a new body. Naraku kidnaps and corrupts Kikyo. Naraku sends the illusions to ensnare Inuyasha's group. Immune to the illusions, Kagome shoots at Naraku's demon puppet, but a sinkhole opens up and nearly swallows her. Kikyo kills the demon puppet and tells her that Naraku fears Kagome over anyone. Kikyo steals the jewel shard, tells her that only one of them (Kikyo or Kagome) is needed, and allows her to fall into the sinkhole. Inuyasha's concern for Kagome breaks the spell on him. He rescues Miroku, Sango and Kagome. Kikyo gives the jewel shard for Naraku, so he can collect the rest of them. The blacksmith Toto-sai meets Inuyasha, testing whether he is worthy for Tessaiga. If not, Toto-sai, who first made it, will destroy it. Sesshomaru threatens to kill Toto-sai for not making another sword like Tessaiga for him. When the brothers fight each other, Toto-sai tells Sesshomaru that the sword Tenseiga is superior to Tessaiga, but Sesshomaru does not believe him. Toto-sai escapes with Inuyasha's group. Sesshomaru tells Jaken about Tenseiga, a sword of resurrection. Inuyasha overwhelms Sesshomaru and destroys the dragon's arm, after learning "Wind Scar".
14	Gray Areas	February 18, 2000; 4-09-125584-1	June 11, 2003; 978-1-56931-886-7
129. "The True Master" (真の使い手, "Shin no Tsukaite"); 130. "Wolves" (狼, "Ôkami"); 131. "The Maiden's Life" (少女の命, "Shōjo no Inochi"); 132. "Koga" (鋼牙, "Kōga"); 133. "Hostage" (生け捕り, "Ikedori"); 134. "The Wolves' Cave" (狼の洞窟, "Ôkami no Dōkutsu"); 135. "The Harpies" (極楽鳥, "Gokurakuchō"); 136. "The Three-Way Battle" (三つ巴の戦い, "Mittsudomoe no Tatakai"); 137. "The Stronger Man" (強い男, "Tsuyoi Otoko"); 138. "Why She Let Him Go" (逃がした理由, "Nigashita Wake")
Partially blinded by poison, Sesshomaru flees. Toto-sai decides that Inuyasha is worthy of Tessaiga after agreeing to hone it. He tells him that Tenseiga chose to save Sesshomaru. Some distance away, the paralyzed Sesshomaru meets and accompanies Rin, an orphan girl. She offers anything for him. The wolf-demon Koga and his pack invade the village and kill Rin. Healed from his wounds, Sesshomaru follows the scent and resurrects Rin. Inuyasha's group fend the wolves off. When Koga returns to fight, Kagome senses the jewel shards on his legs. Koga retreats, after kidnapping Kagome and Shippo. Koga tells Kagome to help him find the jewel shards, and that he has taken her for his mate. She shows him the location of the jewel shard implanted within the king of the harpy demons. As the wolf-demons fight with the harpies, she saves one of Koga's friends. Inuyasha's group arrives and help to destroy the harpies, but the harpy king escapes. As Koga and Inuyasha fight over Kagome, the harpy king returns tries to attack them, but Inuyasha kills the king and takes the jewel shards. Kagome stops him from killing Koga for two shards in his legs. Koga's friends carry him away over his protestations, and Kagome returns to the present day.
15	Feminine Wiles	April 18, 2000; 4-09-125585-X	October 15, 2003; 978-1-56931-999-4
139. "Dueling Emotions" (ふたりの気持ち, "Futari no Kimochi"); 140. "The Other Side of the Well" (井戸の向こう, "Ido no Mukō"); 141. "The Chase" (追跡, "Tsuiseki"); 142. "Corpse Dance" (屍舞, "Shikabanemai"); 143. "Kagura" (神楽, "Kagura"); 144. "Wind Witch" (風使い, "Kaze-tsukai"); 145. "The Spider on Her Back" (背中の蜘蛛, "Senaka no Kumo"); 146. "Mystery of the Wind Witch" (神楽の謎, "Kagura no Nazo"); 147. "Koharu" (小春, "Koharu"); 148. "Kanna" (神無, "Kanna")
In modern Tokyo, Kagome's friends ask her to date their schoolmate Hojo. Her reluctance makes them accuse her of having another boyfriend. They badger her into talking about Inuyasha, who ends up sounding like a violent, selfish, two-timing chump. Kagome tries to defend his role, making her friends conclude she loves him. Inuyasha climbs into the room, where her brother Sota warns him. He tells him to keep his visit secret and returns to the past. Kagome studies for the exams. She returns to the past and is about to apologize insincerely to Inuyasha when he inadvertently breaks the alarm clock. Inuyasha's group fights a man-eating bear with a jewel shard in its forehead, but before they can defeat it, a swarm of Saimyosho stings the bear and takes the shard. When the group arrives at the castle, they meet Kagura, who has killed Koga's followers and the latter inadvertently blames Inuyasha. Unfortunately, Koga realizes the deception and succumbs to the poison caused by the fake shard. Inuyasha cannot use the Wind Scar, but Kagome shoots an arrow to stop Kagura. The Wind Scar reveals the mark of a spider on her back, before she flees. Because of the spider mark and her scent, both of which resemble Naraku's, they conclude that she is a "detachment" created by Naraku. Kagome uses an arrow to remove the poisonous shard from Koga. Kagura accuses Naraku of endangering her by not telling her about Tetsusaiga's powers, but Naraku threatens to kill her. Koharu, a young girl in love with Miroku, is so overjoyed to meet him again after a three-year absence that Kagome and Sango suspect him of having been intimate with her when she was only eleven years old, but Miroku denies it. Koharu wants to join the group to stay with Miroku, but he tells her that it is dangerous. Sango becomes jealous. They take Koharu to another village where she will no longer be enslaved. Kanna, another detachment of Naraku, uses her mirror to steal the villagers' souls and control their bodies. She controls Koharu into seizing Kagome and stealing her soul. As the controlled villagers fight with Inuyasha, Kagura arrives.
16	Mirror Image	June 17, 2000; 4-09-125586-8	December 31, 2003; 978-1-59116-113-4
149. "The Human Shield" (人間の盾, "Ningen no Tate"); 150. "Turn-Around" (反転, "Hanten"); 151. "The Light of the Shikon" (四魂の光, "Shikon no Hikari"); 152. "The Arrow Released" (放たれた矢, "Hanatareta Ya"); 153. "Kikyo's Plan" (桔梗の真意, "Kikyō no Shin'i"); 154. "The Third Demon" (三匹目の妖怪, "Sanbikime no Yōkai"); 155. "The Mind-Reader" (悟心鬼, "Goshinki"); 156. "Demon Blood" (妖怪の血, "Yōkai no Chi"); 157. "True Nature" (本能, "Honnō"); 158. "The Ogre's Sword" (鬼の剣, "Oni no Tsurugi")
Kagome's soul cannot enter Kanna's mirror. Although weakened, Kagome prevents Kanna from taking the jewel shards. Koharu attacks Miroku, but he knocks her out. Kanna flees and reappears behind Kagura, who is fighting Inuyasha. Kagura deliberately lapses her control of the wind. Inuyasha loses a chance, after Kanna reflects the attack back at Inuyasha. Naraku appears and gloats over Inuyasha. Miroku is about to open his wind tunnel, but Naraku points out that it would devour all of the souls trapped in Kanna's mirror. The controlled villagers attack Miroku. Naraku orders Kagura to kill Inuyasha. Meanwhile, Kirara escorts Kagome to Inuyasha and Miroku. Naraku says that his power to create detachments comes from the nearly-complete jewel which Kikyo stole from Kagome and gave to him. When Kagome shoots an arrow at Naraku's group, Kanna reflects it, but her mirror begins to crack from the extra charge of spiritual force added to its burden of souls. It releases all the souls from the mirror, losing control of the villages and allowing Kagome to recover. Kagura launches a wind attack which Miroku sucks into his wind tunnel, and Naraku's group flees. Inuyasha's group moves to another location to let Inuyasha and Sango recover. While Kagome and Miroku are out looking for food and medicine, Kikyo meets with Inuyasha. Kagura spies on them for Naraku. but Kikyo drives her away and leaves. Kagome and Miroku return and question Inuyasha about Kikyo. Goshinki, an ogre detachment of Naraku, devours the inhabitants of a village. Inuyasha's group cannot fight him effectively, because he anticipates their moves by reading their minds. When Goshinki breaks Tetsusaiga into pieces, Inuyasha completely loses his half-human personality, transforms to his "full"-demon form and kills Goshinki. Kagome stops the rampage and saves Inuyasha. On Myoga's advice, the group collects Tetsusaiga's pieces and takes them to Toto-sai, who pulls out one of Inuyasha's fangs to repair Tetsusaiga. While they wait for the repairs, Inuyasha loses his powers in the full moon. Sesshomaru takes Goshinki's head to Toto-sai's renegade apprentice, Kaijinbō, to make a sword Tokijin made of fangs. When Jaken arrives, Kaijinbō kills him.
17	A Savage Cut	August 9, 2000; 4-09-125587-6	April 7, 2004; 978-1-59116-238-4
159. "Tokijin" (闘鬼神, "Tōkijin"); 160. "Tetsusaiga Reborn" (蘇る鉄砕牙, "Yomigaeru Tessaiga"); 161. "Tokijin's Choice" (闘鬼神の使い手, "Tōkijin no Tsukaite"); 162. "The Scent of Blood" (血の匂い, "Chi no Nioi"); 163. "True Strength" (本当の強さ, "Hontō no Tsuyosa"); 164. "The Fourth One" (四匹め, "Yonhikime"); 165. "Juromaru, the Beast Boy" (獣郎丸, "Jūrōmaru"); 166. "Without Shields" (解かれた封印, "Tokareta Fūin"); 167. "Shadow Boy" (影郎丸, "Kagerōmaru"); 168. "Two Against Two" (二対二, "Nitaini")
Sesshomaru resurrects Jaken. Controlled by the sword Tokijin, Kaijinbo attacks Inuyasha during the night of the new moon. The rest of the group tries to fight him off while Inuyasha remains in his vulnerable full-human form. Tokijin cuts Sango's boomarang in half, even when Miroku splits Kaijinbo's head open, his body continues to fight. Toto-sai brings the reforged Tetsusaiga, but Inuyasha cannot use it at full strength or in human form. He cannot tap into its demonic powers, and when his half-demon shape returns, the sword becomes almost too heavy to lift. When Tetsusaiga and Tokijin clash, Kaijinbo's body disintegrates under the strain. Toto-sai says the extra weight is from Inuyasha's fang and he must build up his strength. Sesshomaru claims Tokijin, easily overcoming the aura, and disarms Inuyasha to test his brother's transformation. Inuyasha involuntarily returns to berserker full-demon mode again. Toto-sai breathes fire as cover to let the rest of the group drag Inuyasha away. Toto-sai repairs Sango's boomerang. The group persuades Inuyasha to never part with Tetsusaiga again, though without telling him that it suppresses his full-demon transformation. Naraku deploys two new detachments: Juromaru and Kageromaru. Although partially bound, Juromaru fights and pursues Koga. As their path intersects Inuyasha's group, Naraku frees Juromaru and he destroys his surrogate demon puppet. Kageromaru emerges from Juromaru's gut to join the fight, moving almost rapidly to see, and eats some of Inuyasha's innards. Koga rejoins the fight to protect Kagome, taking on Kageromaru while Inuyasha focuses on Juromaru. Inuyasha passes out but awakes when Kageromaru threatens to eat Kagome.
18	Love and Lust	October 18, 2000; 4-09-125588-4	July 7, 2004; 978-1-59116-331-2
169. "The Enemy in the Earth" (土中の敵, "Dochū no Teki"); 170. "Pulverized" (粉砕, "Funsai"); 171. "Kikyo's Crisis" (桔梗の危機, "Kikyō no Kiki"); 172. "Onigumo's Heart" (鬼蜘蛛の心, "Onigumo no Kokoro"); 173. "Jealousy" (嫉妬, "Shitto"); 174. "The Soil Shield" (土の結界, "Tsuchi no Kekkai"); 175. "Where They First Met" (出会った場所, "Deatta Basho"); 176. "Kagome's Heart" (かごめの心, "Kagome no Kokoro"); 177. "The Castle's Ghost" (城の跡, "Shiro no Ato"); 178. "Kohaku's Memory" (琥珀の記憶, "Kohaku no Kioku")
Inuyasha removes Kageromaru's arm, when the injured "detachment" hides underground, Sango poisons the nearby soil to drive him back up. Kageromaru emerges and disappears back into Juromaru's stomach. Inuyasha destroys both detachments. Nearly hit by the Wind Scar himself, Koga, Inuyasha and Kagome argue, before leaving separately. When a giant soul-collector demon ambushes Kikyo, she flees with Inuyasha. As Inuyasha destroys the demon near the Bone Eater's Well, Kikyo tells him about the Shikon Jewel and Naraku out of jealousy. Kagome sees Kikyo and Inuyasha embracing, while Naraku secretly watches all of them in Kanna's mirror. Kikyo uses soil from Onigumo's cave to protect herself from Naraku, whose right arm she then shoots off, when one of his demons touches her, it disintegrates. She warns him to leave her alone or suffer the same fate. Kagome gives her supplies to Miroku and Sango, and returns home again. Inuyasha resolves to forgive Kagome for what they did. When Kagome's friends again tell her to dump Inuyasha, she does not comply. Although she says she is fine, they sense her grief. She cannot return the shard for Inuyasha, because she might not see him again, exposing how deeply she loves him. She reconciles with Inuyasha, knowing they can get together without Kikyo. Naraku's castle disintegrates and the barrier hiding its location dissipates. When Inuyasha's group investigates the ruins, the remains of Sango's family convinces them that it is the real thing and they move the remains to sacred ground. Kohaku has forgotten Naraku, but the sight of approaching saimyosho jogs his memory and he flees. He encounters Inuyasha's group, which fights off the saimyosho from taking the jewel shard that keeps Kohaku alive. As Sango treats Kohaku's wounds, she tells him that he is her brother. More demons come with Kagura, who demands Kohaku's shard despite suspecting that Naraku plays a trick on them.
19	Target: Kagome!	January 18, 2001; 4-09-125589-2	September 7, 2004; 978-1-59116-678-8
179. "Suspicion" (疑い, "Utagai"); 180. "The Erased Heart" (消された心, "Kesareta Kokoro"); 181. "Sango's Decision" (珊瑚の決意, "Sango no Ketsui"); 182. "The Face That Wouldn't Disappear" (消えない顔, "Kienai Kao"); 183. "Secret of the Transformation" (変化の秘密, "Henge no Himitsu"); 184. "The Venomous Cocoon" (毒の繭, "Doku no Mayu"); 185. "Rampage" (蹂躙, "Jūrin"); 186. "The Lost Soul" (失われた心, "Ushinawareta Kokoro"); 187. "Blood Soaked In" (しみついた血, "Shimitsuita Chi"); 188. "The Talon Shield" (爪の封印, "Tsume no Fūin")
Kagura leads a demon horde against Inuyasha's group, supposedly to recover Kohaku's jewel shard. As the others fight, Kagome and Kohaku wait inside the shelter until demons break in. Kohaku fights them off, and runs into the forest with Kagome to hide. Miroku notices that the demons are still focused on him, Inuyasha, and Sango instead of pursuing Kohaku, and concludes that Kohaku is working for Naraku to get Kagome. Miroku opens his wind tunnel to stop the fight, in spite of being stung by saimyosho, and Kagura flees. Naraku's demon puppet orders Kohaku to kill Kagome, but he wounds her, grabs the jewel shards, and leaves. Sango pursues Kohaku, planning to kill him to free him from Naraku and himself. Inuyasha stops her and recovers the shards. Kohaku flees with Kagura, but Naraku punishes him by briefly restoring his unbearable memories. An ancient Magnolia tree-demon, Bokusen'on, whose branches were made into the scabbards of Tetsusaiga and Tenseiga, explains Inuyasha's demonic transformation to Sesshomaru. Gatenmaru, a moth-demon, leads bandits to raid a village. When Inuyasha cuts Gatenmaru's war-ax with Tetsusaiga, Gatenmaru envelops Inuyasha and Miroku in a poisonous cocoon and tries to take Tetsusaiga, but it burns him as it burned Sesshomaru. Inuyasha undergoes his demonic transformation, rips through the cocoon, and kills Gatenmaru and all of the bandits, even though some of them were pleading for their lives. To test the information from Bokusen'on, Sesshomaru arrives, knocks out Inuyasha, and leaves. When the group gives Tetsusaiga back to Inuyasha, he returns to his normal form and is appalled at his own actions. Afraid that he might kill Kagome when transformed, Inuyasha asks Toto-sai for advice. Toto-sai suggests to kill the dragon Ryukotsusei, and gain control over Tetsusaiga. As Inuyasha arrives at the place where Ryukotsusei is sealed, Naraku breaks the seal to free Ryukotsusei.
20	Shards of Evil?	March 17, 2001; 4-09-125590-6	January 4, 2005; 978-1-59116-626-9
189. "The Dragon-Bone Spirit" (竜骨精, "Ryūkossei"); 190. "Talons and Blade" (爪と刀, "Tsume to Katana"); 191. "The New Tetsusaiga" (新生鉄砕牙, "Shinsei Tessaiga"); 192. "The Crushing Stream" (爆流破, "Bakuryūha"); 193. "Tsubaki, the Black Priestess" (黒巫女 椿, "Kuromiko Tsubaki"); 194. "The Curse" (呪詛, "Juso"); 195. "The Arrow's Mark" (向けられた矢, "Mukerareta Ya"); 196. "Tsubaki's Shrine" (椿の祠, "Tsubaki no Hokora"); 197. "The Shikigami" (式神, "Shikigami"); 198. "The Curse Reflected" (呪い返し, "Noroi-gaeshi")
Inuyasha cannot injure Ryukotsusei, who gloats that his body is harder and invulnerable. Toto-sai arrives with Inuyasha's group and says that unsealed, Ryukotsusei can only be destroyed with the Bakuryu-ha ("crushing stream" or "backlash wave" in the anime). When Tetsusaiga is knocked away, Inuyasha transforms to his demonic form and begins to drive Ryukotsusei back, but Toto-sai says this will not make Tetsusaiga lighter and wants to flee. Kagome insists that they stay to support Inuyasha, who returns to his normal form when he recovers Tetsusaiga, which starts to feel less heavy. Inuyasha kills Ryukotsusei with the wind scar. Inuyasha demonstrates that he can now produce the technique at will, but is chastised for showing off. Naraku offers the nearly-complete Shikon jewel to the dark priestess Tsubaki, a former contemporary of Kikyo's, who preserves her youth and beauty by dealing with demons. Kagome tells her friends in modern Tokyo that she made up with Inuyasha. When she returns, Tsubaki uses the jewel to curse Kagome's jewel shards and control her. Miroku and Sango look for Tsubaki, hoping to kill her and free Kagome. At Naraku's request, Tsubaki possesses Kagome, but she manages to resist her. Naraku tells her not to underestimate Kagome, since she is Kikyo's reincarnation, but Tsubaki is upset. Kagome tells Inuyasha to run away so she cannot kill him, but he stays. Miroku and Sango cannot pass through the barrier, but Kikyo walks right through it and destroys the demon puppet. Tsubaki realizes that Kikyo is alive. Kikyo says that Kagome will defeat Tsubaki, and threatens to kill her if Inuyasha is harmed. Inuyasha brings Kagome, who disables the barrier. Kikyo leaves. Tsubaki threatens to kill Inuyasha if he uses Tetsusaiga, attacks him with her main demon, and reinforces her curse on Kagome. Miroku cannot exorcise Tsubaki's shikigami to break the curse. Tsubaki avoids the attack and reinforces the curse on Kagome. After Inuyasha kills Tsubaki's main demon, her other demons and shikigami all attack. Kagome rebounds the shikigami, like Kikyo did in another duel with Tsubaki fifty years ago. The curse breaks and the jewel is purified, although Tsubaki carries it away with her remaining demons before they die. A saimyosho takes the jewel and Tsubaki dies.
