= Black Moon =

Black Moon may refer to:

- Black Moon (person) (c. 1821–1893), Lakota (American Indian) headman
- Black Moon or Lilith (fictitious moon), a supposed second, invisible moon of Earth

== Music ==
- Black Moon (group), a hip-hop group from Brooklyn
- Blackmoon, alias of Swedish metal guitarist David Parland
- Black Moon (album), a 1992 album by Emerson, Lake & Palmer, as well as its title track
- "Black Moon", a song by Black Sabbath from Headless Cross
- "Black Moon", a track on Deftones album B-Sides & Rarities
- "Black Moon", a song by The Lacs

== Visual arts ==
- Black Moon (1934 film), a 1934 film starring Fay Wray
- Black Moon (1975 film), a surreal film from 1975
- Black Moon (car), a fictional car from the 1986 action film Black Moon Rising
- Black Moon Chronicles, a French fantasy comic book series
- Black Moon Clan, a group of villains in the Sailor Moon franchise

== See also ==
- New moon - the first lunar phase, when the Moon and Sun have the same ecliptic longitude. At this phase, the lunar disk is not usually visible to the naked eye.
