= Planetary parade =

Apparent alignment of planets in the night sky

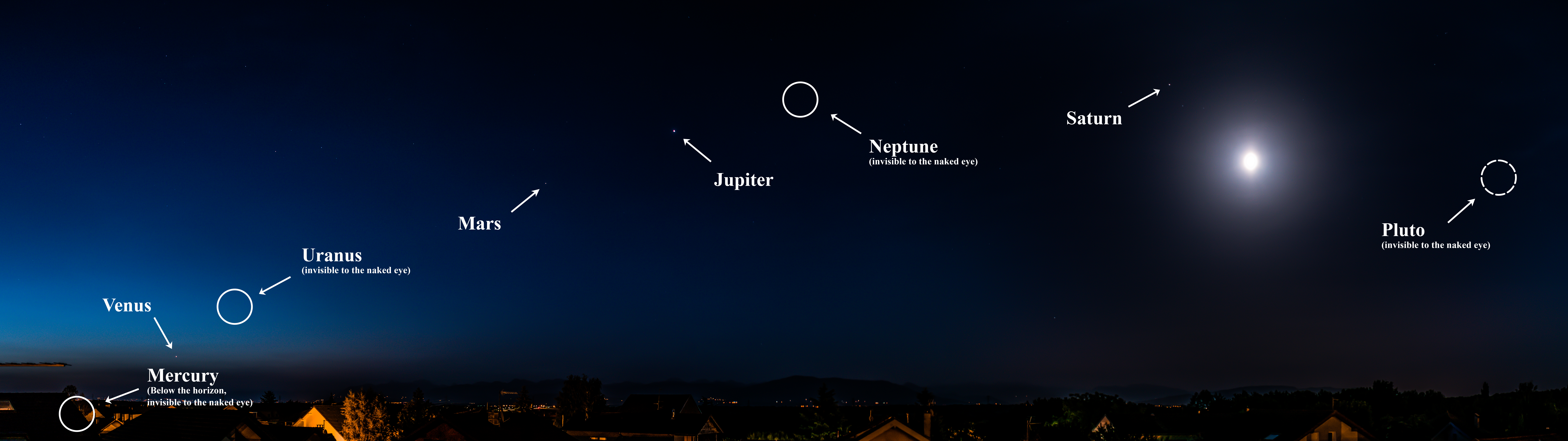
A seven-planet planetary parade seen from France in 2022

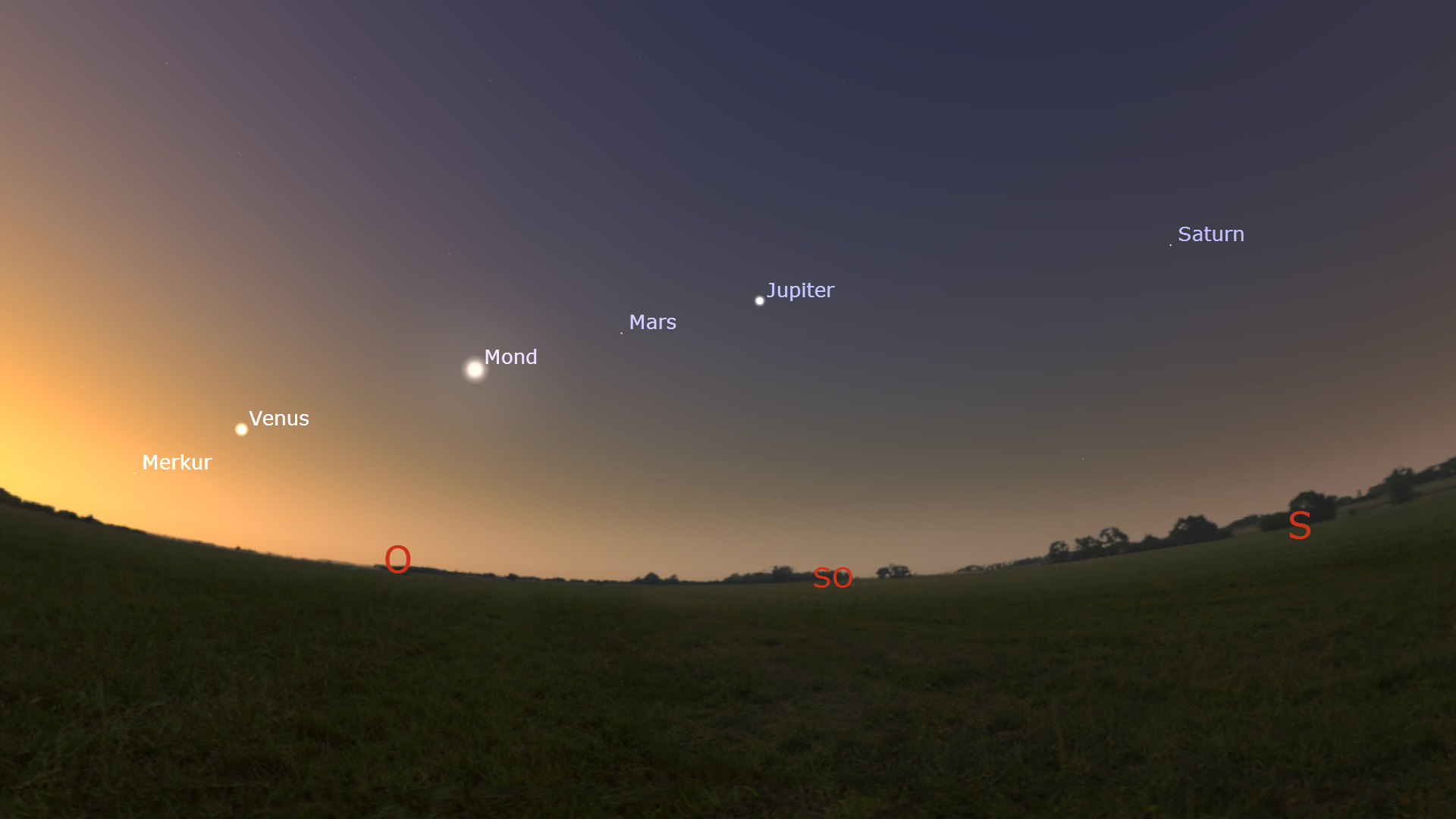
A simulation of the same 2022 parade

In amateur astronomy, a planetary parade, also known as a planetary alignment or planetary procession, occurs when multiple planets in the Solar System are visible at the same time from Earth. However, a planetary parade is not a true alignment in space, but rather an apparent alignment that is the result of the planets' orbital positions relative to viewpoint of Earth-bound observers lying in an arc across the sky.

Planetary parades of three, four or five planets are commonplace events, but larger planetary parades are less frequent. Because the motions of planets are predictable, the timing of planetary parades past and future can be easily calculated across long time periods.

== Notable planetary parades ==
=== 2025 planetary parade ===
Two large planetary parades occurred in 2025, aligning six and seven planets respectively.

The ongoing planetary alignment is the first phase of this astronomical event in 2025, which began on 21 January and ended on 21 February 2025. During this phase Venus, Mars, Jupiter, Uranus, Neptune, and Saturn were visible in the night sky.

The second phase of this astronomical event was predicted to occur on 28 February 2025 with seven planets. The planet Mercury joined with six other planets which were visible during the first phase.

=== 2040 planetary parade ===
Following the 2025 parade, the next seven-planet parade will not occur until 2040. The five naked-eye planets cluster within 7° of longitude on September 12.

== See also ==
- Syzygy (astronomy), a real collinear configuration of three or more celestial bodies
- Conjunction (astronomy), where two or more objects appear close together in the sky
