= Syzygy (astronomy) =

Alignment of celestial bodies

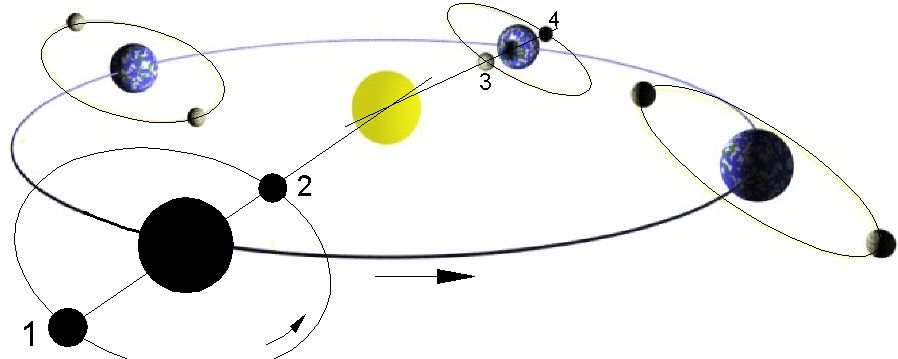
A syzygy occurs during eclipses (numbers 1, 2, 3, 4).

In astronomy, a syzygy (/ˈsɪzədʒi/ SIZ-ə-jee) (Note: from Ancient Greek συζυγία (suzugía) 'union, yoking', expressing the sense of σύν (syn- 'together') and ζυγ- (zug- 'a yoke')) is a roughly straight-line configuration of three or more celestial bodies in a gravitational system.

The word is often used in reference to the Sun, Earth, and either the Moon or a planet, where the latter is in conjunction or opposition. Solar and lunar eclipses occur at times of syzygy, as do transits and occultations.

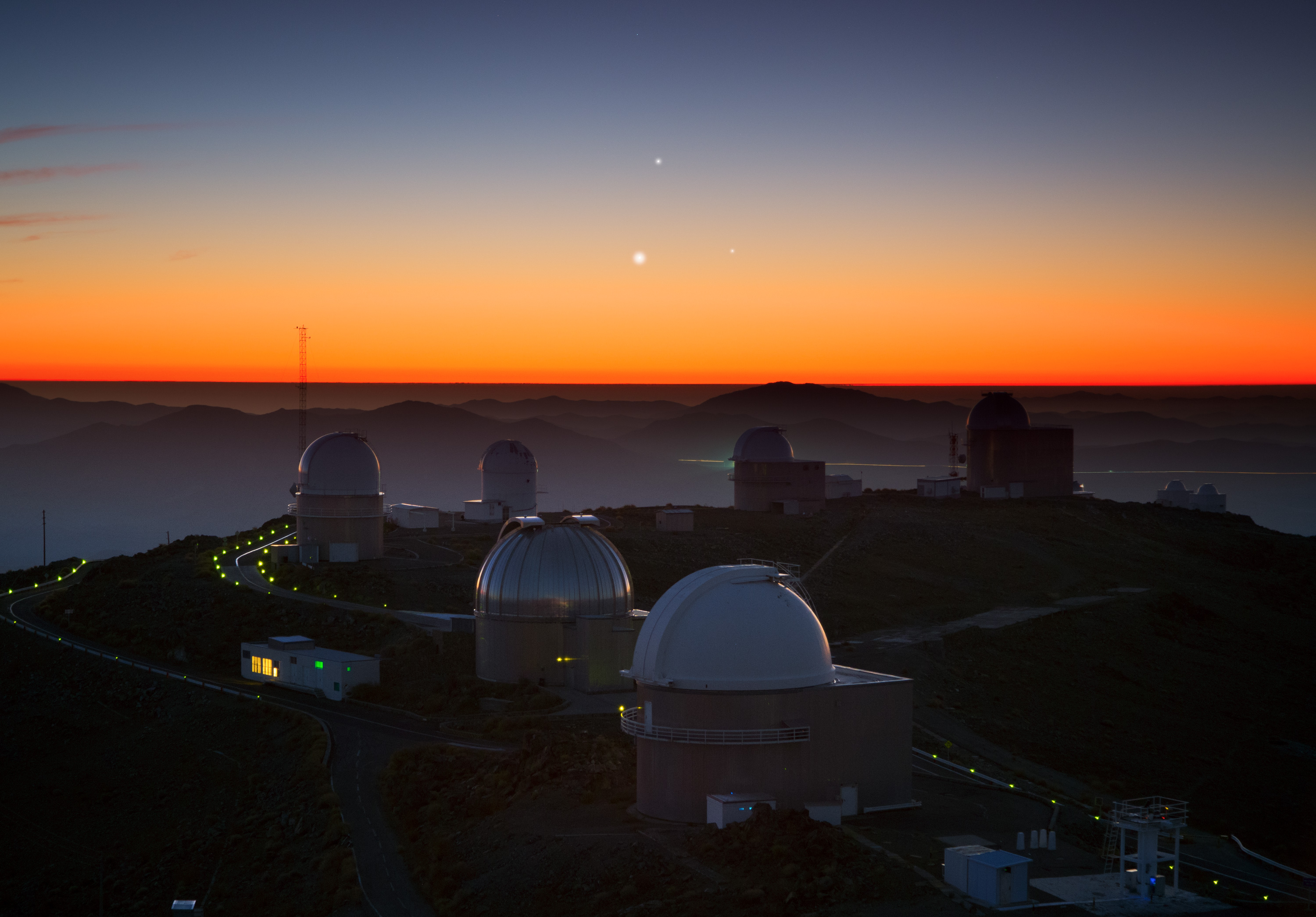
Jupiter (top), Venus (lower left), and Mercury (lower right) above La Silla Observatory, Chile (May 26, 2013)

== Main types ==
A syzygy may, under certain conditions, result in an occultation, transit, or an eclipse.

- An occultation occurs when an apparently larger body passes in front of an apparently smaller one, obscuring it from view.
- A transit occurs when a smaller body passes in front of a larger one.
  - In the combined case where the smaller body regularly transits the larger, an occultation is also termed a secondary eclipse. It is commonly used to refer to cases where a planet travels behind its host star as viewed from Earth.
- An eclipse occurs when a body totally or partially disappears from view, either by an occultation, as with a solar eclipse, or by passing into the shadow of another body, as with a lunar eclipse (thus, both are listed on NASA's eclipse page).

== Consequences ==
=== Einstein ring ===
As electromagnetic rays are affected by gravitation, when they pass by a heavy mass they are bent. As a result, the heavy mass acts as a form of gravitational lens. If the light source, the gravitating mass and the observer stand in a line, one sees what is termed an Einstein ring.

=== Tidal variation ===
A syzygy causes the fortnightly phenomena of spring tides. At the new and full moon, the Sun and Moon are in syzygy. Their tidal forces act to reinforce each other, and the ocean both rises higher and falls lower than the average. Tidal variations can also be measured in the Earth's crust, and these Earth tide influences may affect the frequency of earthquakes.

== Extraterrestrial cases ==
The word syzygy is often used to describe interesting configurations of astronomical objects in general. For example, one such case occurred on March 21, 1894, around 23:00 GMT, when Mercury transited the Sun as would have been seen from Venus, and Mercury and Venus both simultaneously transited the Sun as seen from Saturn.

Mercury transiting the Sun as viewed by the Curiosity rover on Mars (June 3, 2014).

On June 3, 2014, the Curiosity rover on Mars observed the planet Mercury transiting the Sun, marking the first time a planetary transit has been observed from a celestial body besides Earth.

== Other uses ==
The term is also used to describe situations when all the planets are on the same side of the Sun although they are not necessarily in a straight line, such as on March 10, 1982.

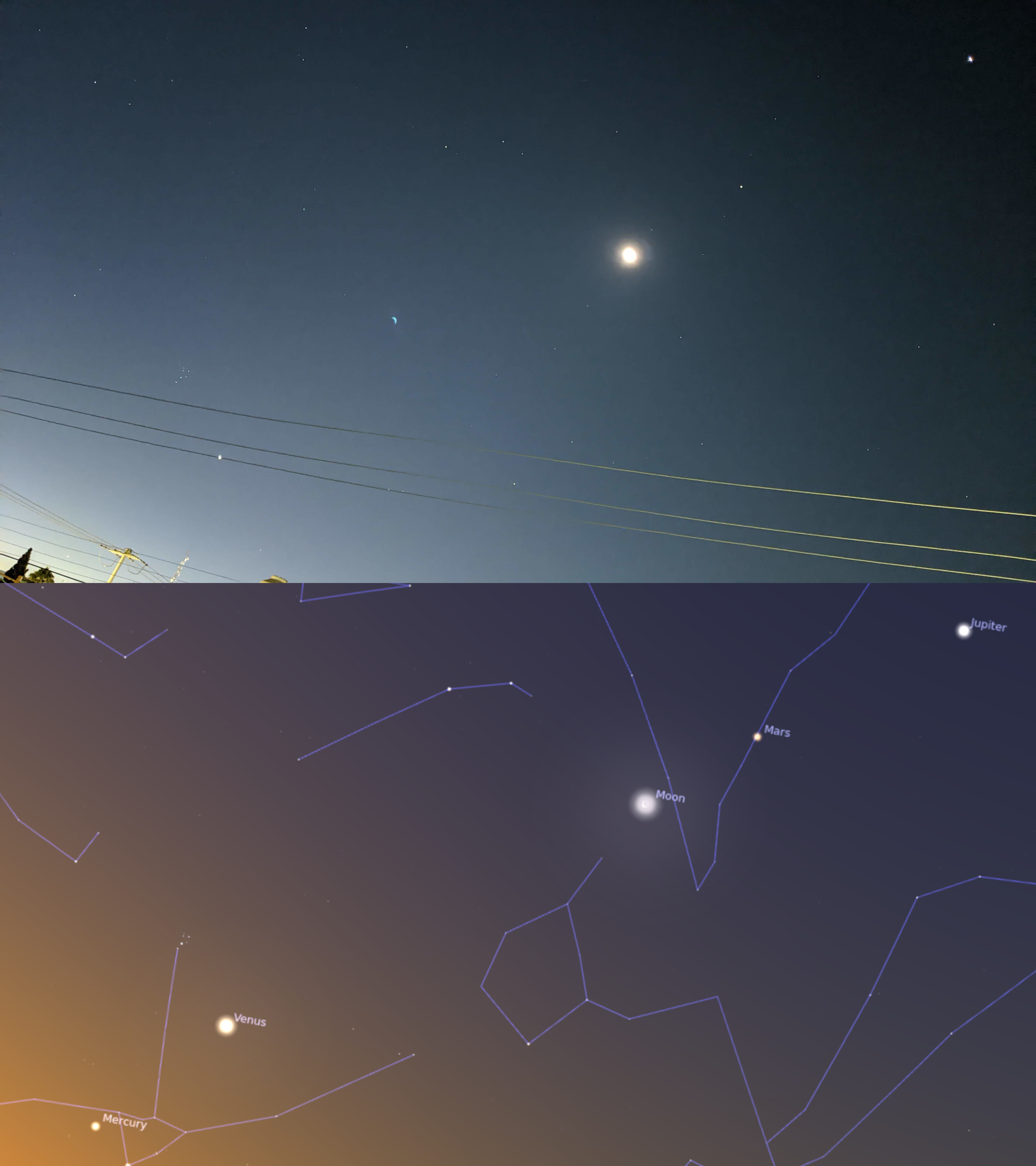
Apparent planetary alignment involving Mercury, Venus, Mars, and Jupiter; the Moon is also shown, as the brightest object.

Because the orbits of all the planets in the Solar System (as well as the Moon) are inclined by only a few degrees, they always appear very near the ecliptic in our sky. Therefore, although an apparent planetary alignment known as a planetary parade may appear as a line (actually, a great arc), the planets are not necessarily aligned in space.
