= Tidal force =

Gravitational effect also known as the differential force and the perturbing force

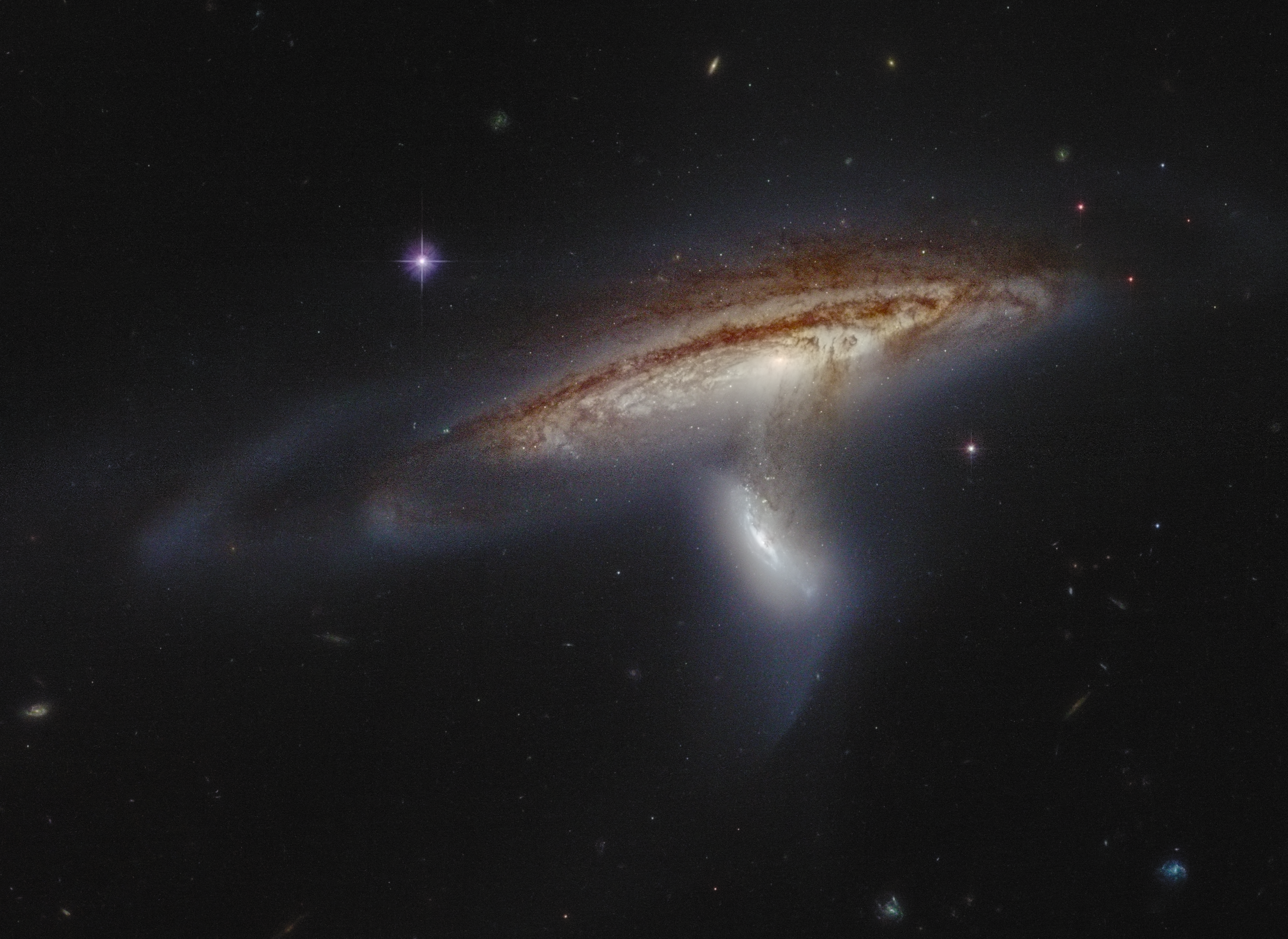
Figure 1: Tidal interaction between the spiral galaxy NGC 169 and a smaller companion

The tidal force or tide-generating force is the difference in gravitational attraction between different points in a gravitational field. It causes different parts of bodies to be pulled unevenly, so that those bodies are being stretched towards the attraction.

Tidal force is the differential effect of gravity across an extended body. Rather than the total gravitational force, it is the spatial variation in that force. Equivalently, it is the gradient of the gravitational field or the derivative of the gravitational potential. Tidal forces are therefore a residual effect of gravity, arising because the near side of a body experiences a stronger attraction than the more distant far side.

This produces a range of tidal phenomena, such as ocean tides. Earth's tides are mainly produced by the relative close gravitational field of the Moon and to a lesser extent by the stronger, but further away gravitational field of the Sun. The ocean on the side of Earth facing the Moon is being pulled by the gravity of the Moon away from Earth's crust, while on the other side of Earth there the crust is being pulled away from the ocean, resulting in Earth being stretched, bulging on both sides, and having opposite high-tides. Tidal forces viewed from Earth, that is from a rotating reference frame, appear as centripetal and centrifugal forces, but are not caused by the rotation.

Further tidal phenomena include solid-earth tides, tidal locking, breaking apart of celestial bodies and formation of ring systems within the Roche limit, and in extreme cases, spaghettification of objects. Tidal forces have also been shown to be fundamentally related to gravitational waves.

In celestial mechanics, the expression tidal force can refer to a situation in which a body or material (for example, tidal water) is mainly under the gravitational influence of a second body (for example, the Earth), but is also perturbed by the gravitational effects of a third body (for example, the Moon). The perturbing force is sometimes in such cases called a tidal force (for example, the perturbing force on the Moon): it is the difference between the force exerted by the third body on the second and the force exerted by the third body on the first.

== Explanation ==
Figure 2: Shown in red, the Moon's gravity residual field at the surface of the Earth is known (along with another and weaker differential effect due to the Sun) as the tide generating force. This is the primary mechanism driving tidal action, explaining two simultaneous tidal bulges. Earth's rotation accounts further for the occurrence of two high tides per day on the same location. In this figure, the Earth is the central black circle while the Moon is far off to the right. It shows both the tidal field (thick red arrows) and the gravity field (thin blue arrows) exerted on Earth's surface and center (label O) by the Moon (label S). The outward direction of the arrows on the right and left of the Earth indicates that where the Moon is at zenith or at nadir.

When a body O is acted on by the gravity of another body S, the field can vary significantly between the sides of O facing away and towards S. Figure 2 shows the differential force of gravity in red, which can be derived by subtracting the body's overall force vector (shown in blue at the center) from the force vectors at the points of interest (shown in blue along the surface).

These tidal forces cause strains on both bodies and may distort them or even, in extreme cases, break one or the other apart. The Roche limit is the distance from a planet at which tidal effects would cause an object to disintegrate because the differential force of gravity from the planet overcomes the attraction of the parts of the object for one another. These strains would not occur if the gravitational field were uniform, because a uniform field only causes the entire body to accelerate together in the same direction and at the same rate.

== Size and distance ==
The relationship of an astronomical body's size, to its distance from another body, strongly influences the magnitude of tidal force. The tidal force acting on an astronomical body, such as the Earth, is directly proportional to the diameter of the Earth and inversely proportional to the cube of the distance from another body producing a gravitational attraction, such as the Moon or the Sun. Tidal action on bath tubs, swimming pools, lakes, and other small bodies of water is negligible.

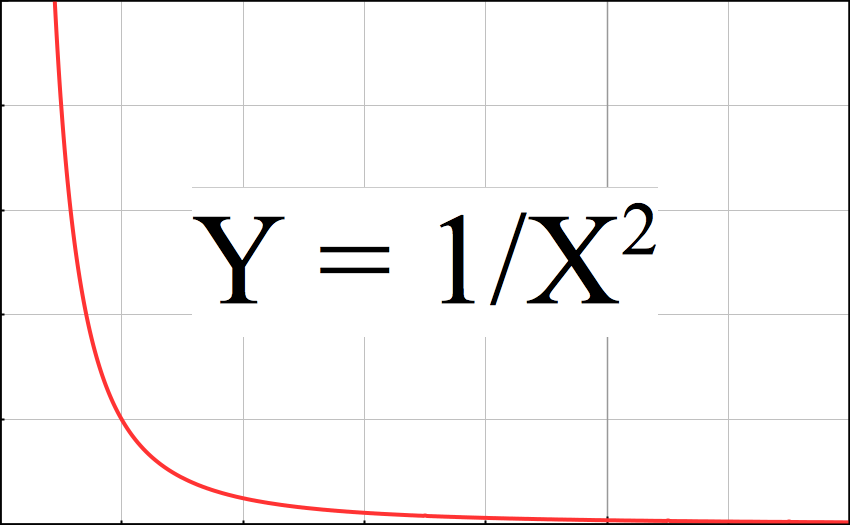
Figure 3: Graph showing how gravitational attraction drops off with increasing distance from a body

Figure 3 is a graph showing how gravitational force declines with distance. In this graph, the attractive force decreases in proportion to the square of the distance (Y = 1/X^{2}), while the slope (Y′ = −2/X^{3}) is inversely proportional to the cube of the distance.

The tidal force corresponds to the difference in Y between two points on the graph, with one point on the near side of the body, and the other point on the far side. The tidal force becomes larger, when the two points are either farther apart, or when they are more to the left on the graph, meaning closer to the attracting body.

For example, even though the Sun has a stronger overall gravitational pull on Earth, the Moon creates a larger tidal bulge because the Moon is closer. This difference is due to the way gravity weakens with distance: the Moon's closer proximity creates a steeper decline in its gravitational pull as you move across Earth (compared to the Sun's very gradual decline from its vast distance). This steeper gradient in the Moon's pull results in a larger difference in force between the near and far sides of Earth, which is what creates the bigger tidal bulge.

Gravitational attraction is inversely proportional to the square of the distance from the source. The attraction will be stronger on the side of a body facing the source, and weaker on the side away from the source. The tidal force is proportional to the difference.

=== Sun, Earth, and Moon ===
The Sun is about 20 million times the Moon's mass, and acts on the Earth over a distance about 400 times larger than that of the Moon. Because of the cubic dependence on distance, this results in the solar tidal force on the Earth being about half that of the lunar tidal force.

| Gravitational body causing tidal force | | Body subjected to tidal force | | | Tidal acceleration |
| Body | Mass ($m$) | Body | Radius ($r$) | Distance ($d$) | $Gm ~ \frac{2r}{d^3}$ |
|---|---|---|---|---|---|
| Sun | 1.99×10^{30} kg | Earth | 6.37×10^{6} m | 1.50×10^{11} m | 0.5×10^{−6} m⋅s^{−2} |
| Moon | 7.34×10^{22} kg | Earth | 6.37×10^{6} m | 3.84×10^{8} m | 1.1×10^{−6} m⋅s^{−2} |
| Earth | 5.97×10^{24} kg | Moon | 1.74×10^{6} m | 3.84×10^{8} m | 24.4×10^{−6} m⋅s^{−2} |
G is the gravitational constant = 6.674×10^{−11} m^{3}⋅kg^{−1}⋅s^{−2}

== Effects ==
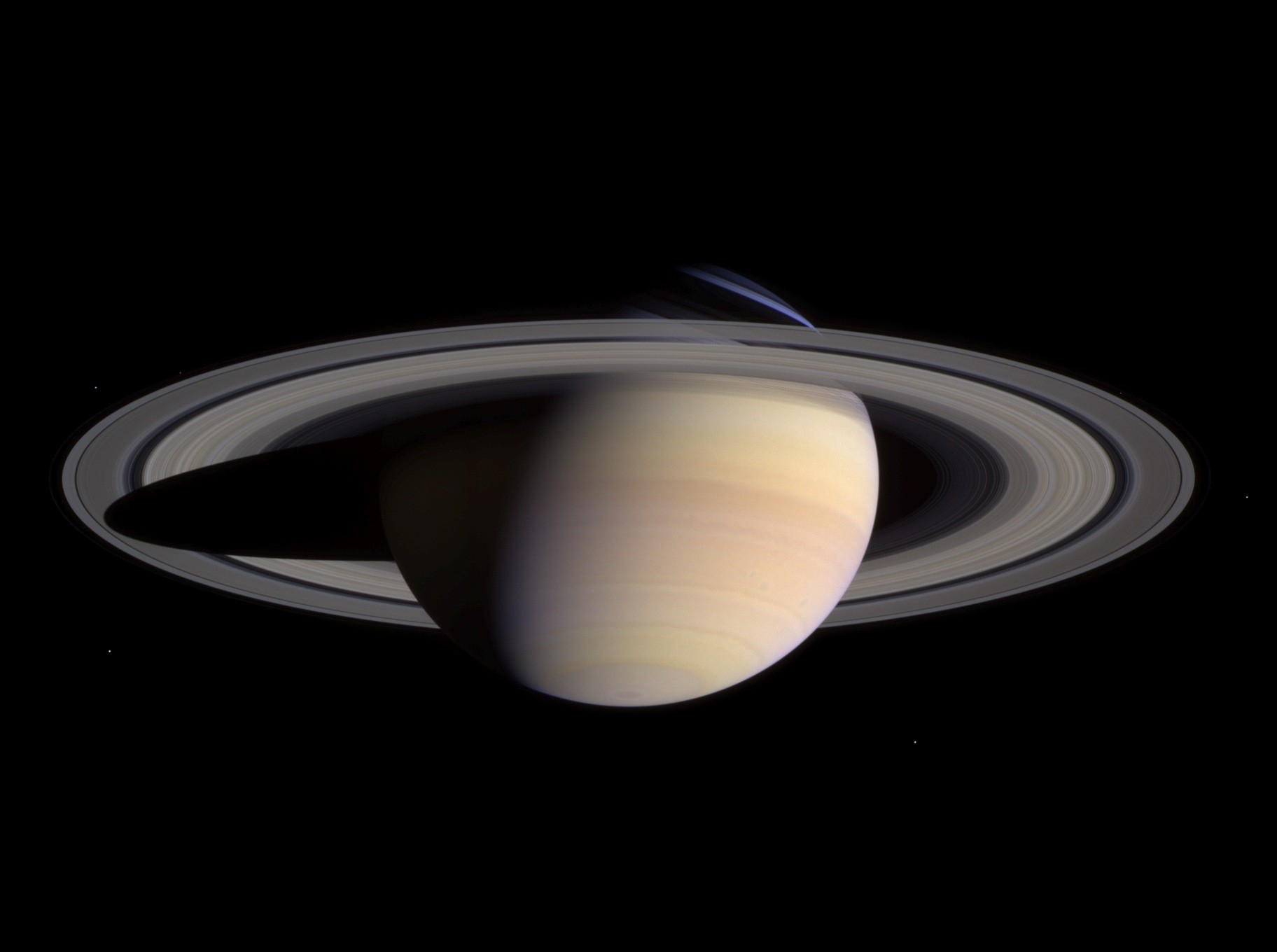
Figure 4: Saturn's rings are inside the orbits of its principal moons. Tidal forces oppose gravitational coalescence of the material in the rings to form moons.

In the case of an infinitesimally small elastic sphere, the effect of a tidal force is to distort the shape of the body without any change in volume. The sphere becomes an ellipsoid with two bulges, pointing towards and away from the other body. Larger objects distort into an ovoid, and are slightly compressed, which is what happens to the Earth's oceans under the action of the Moon. All parts of the Earth are subject to the Moon's gravitational forces, causing the water in the oceans to redistribute, forming bulges on the sides near the Moon and far from the Moon.

When a body rotates while subject to tidal forces, internal friction results in the gradual dissipation of its rotational kinetic energy as heat. In the case for the Earth, and Earth's Moon, the loss of rotational kinetic energy results in a gain of about 2 milliseconds per century. If the body is close enough to its primary, this can result in a rotation which is tidally locked to the orbital motion, as in the case of the Earth's moon. Tidal heating produces dramatic volcanic effects on Jupiter's moon Io. Stresses caused by tidal forces also cause a regular monthly pattern of moonquakes on Earth's Moon.

Tidal forces contribute to ocean currents, which moderate global temperatures by transporting heat energy toward the poles. It has been suggested that variations in tidal forces correlate with cool periods in the global temperature record at 6- to 10-year intervals, and that harmonic beat variations in tidal forcing may contribute to millennial climate changes. No strong link to millennial climate changes has been found to date.

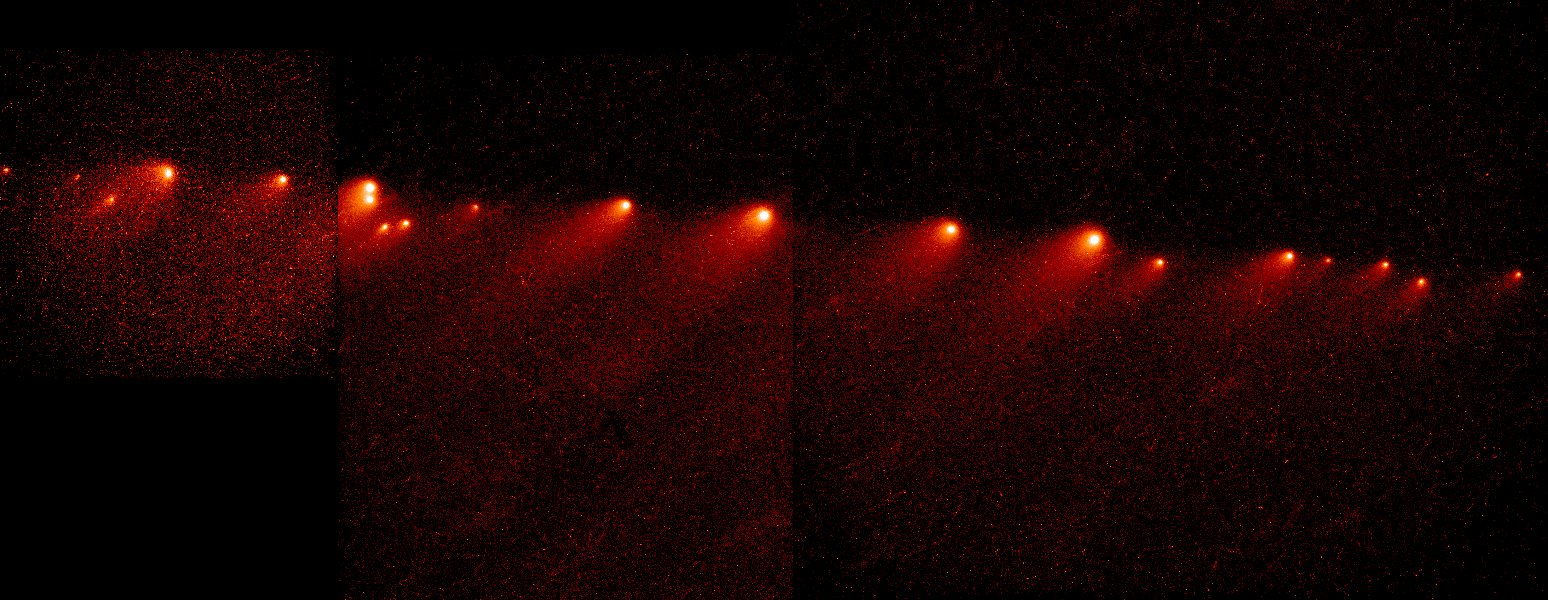
Figure 5: Comet Shoemaker-Levy 9 in 1994 after breaking up under the influence of Jupiter's tidal forces during a previous pass in 1992.

Tidal effects become particularly pronounced near small bodies of high mass, such as neutron stars or black holes, where they are responsible for the "spaghettification" of infalling matter. Tidal forces create the oceanic tide of Earth's oceans, where the attracting bodies are the Moon and, to a lesser extent, the Sun. Tidal forces are also responsible for tidal locking, tidal acceleration, and tidal heating. Tides may also induce seismicity.

By generating conducting fluids within the interior of the Earth, tidal forces also affect the Earth's magnetic field.

Figure 6: This simulation shows a star getting torn apart by the gravitational tides of a supermassive black hole.

== Formulation ==
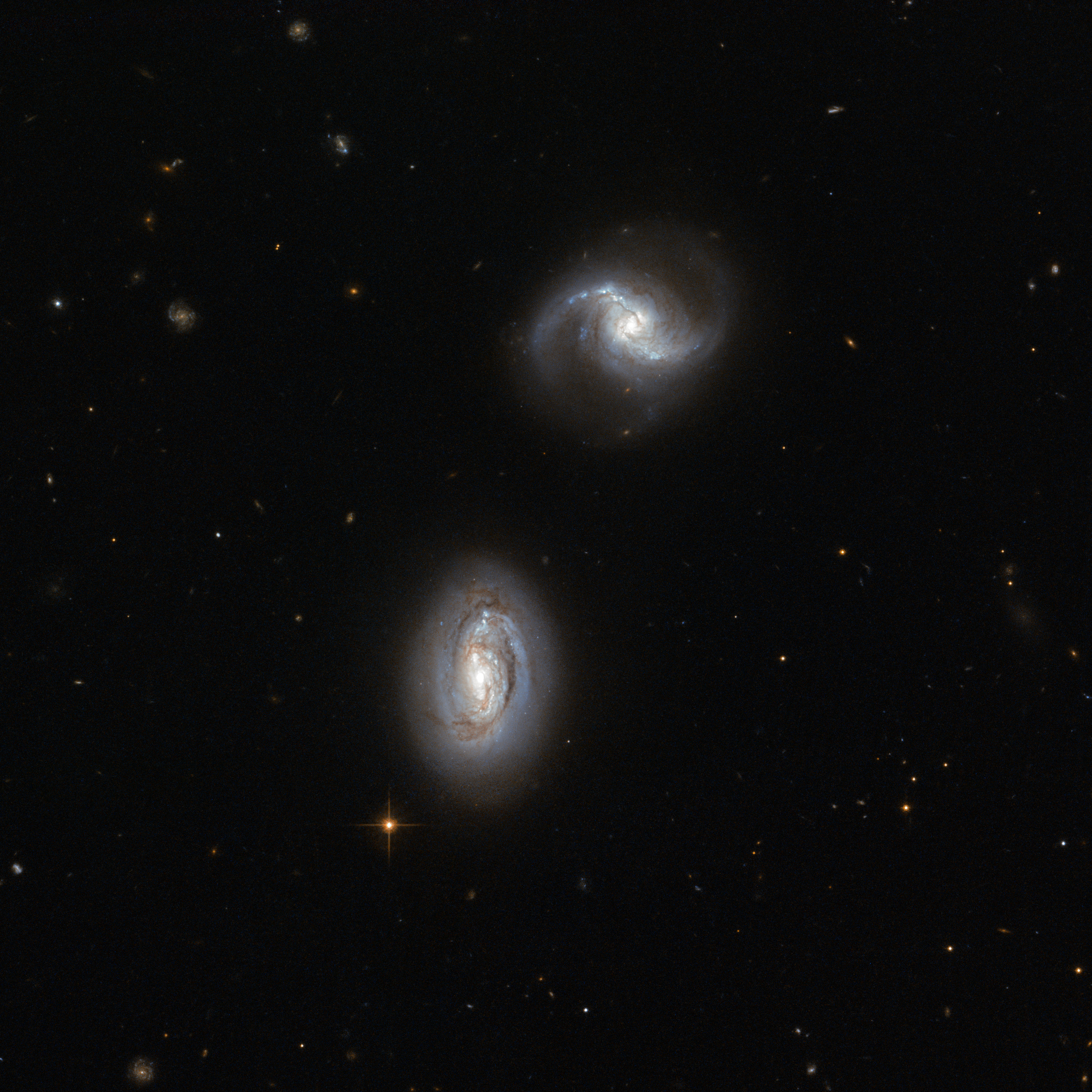
Figure 7: Tidal force is responsible for the merge of galactic pair MRK 1034.

Figure 8: Graphic of tidal forces. The top picture shows the gravity field of a body to the right (not shown); the lower shows their residual gravity once the field at the centre of the sphere is subtracted; this is the tidal force. For visualization purposes, the top arrows may be assumed as equal to 1 N, 2 N, and 3 N (from left to right); the resulting bottom arrows would equal, respectively, −1 N (negative, thus 180-degree rotated), 0 N (invisible), and 1 N. See Figure 2 for a more detailed version

For a given (externally generated) gravitational field, the tidal acceleration at a point with respect to a body is obtained by vector subtraction of the gravitational acceleration at the center of the body (due to the given externally generated field) from the gravitational acceleration (due to the same field) at the given point. Correspondingly, the term tidal force is used to describe the forces due to tidal acceleration. Note that for these purposes the only gravitational field considered is the external one; the gravitational field of the body (as shown in the graphic) is not relevant. (In other words, the comparison is with the conditions at the given point as they would be if there were no externally generated field acting unequally at the given point and at the center of the reference body. The externally generated field is usually that produced by a perturbing third body, often the Sun or the Moon in the frequent example-cases of points on or above the Earth's surface in a geocentric reference frame.)

Tidal acceleration does not require rotation or orbiting bodies; for example, the body may be freefalling in a straight line under the influence of a gravitational field while still being influenced by (changing) tidal acceleration.

By Newton's law of universal gravitation and laws of motion, a body of mass m at distance R from the center of a sphere of mass M feels a force $\vec{F}_g$,

$$\vec{F}_g = - \hat{r} ~ G ~ \frac{M m}{R^2}$$

equivalent to an acceleration $\vec{a}_g$,

$$\vec{a}_g = - \hat{r} ~ G ~ \frac{M}{R^2}$$

where $\hat{r}$ is a unit vector pointing from the body M to the body m (here, acceleration from m towards M has negative sign).

Consider now the acceleration due to the sphere of mass M experienced by a particle in the vicinity of the body of mass m. With R as the distance from the center of M to the center of m, let ∆r be the (relatively small) distance of the particle from the center of the body of mass m. For simplicity, distances are first considered only in the direction pointing towards or away from the sphere of mass M. If the body of mass m is itself a sphere of radius ∆r, then the new particle considered may be located on its surface, at a distance (R ± ∆r) from the centre of the sphere of mass M, and ∆r may be taken as positive where the particle's distance from M is greater than R. Leaving aside whatever gravitational acceleration may be experienced by the particle towards m on account of m's own mass, we have the acceleration on the particle due to gravitational force towards M as:

$$\vec{a}_g = - \hat{r} ~ G ~ \frac{M}{(R \pm \Delta r)^2}$$

Pulling out the R^{2} term from the denominator gives:

$$\vec{a}_g = -\hat{r} ~ G ~ \frac{M}{R^2} ~ \frac{1}{\left(1 \pm \frac{\Delta r}{R}\right)^2}$$

The Maclaurin series of $1/(1 \pm x)^2$ is $1 \mp 2x + 3x^2 \mp \cdots$ which gives a series expansion of:

$$\vec{a}_g = - \hat{r} ~ G ~ \frac{M}{R^2} \pm \hat{r} ~ G ~ \frac{2 M }{R^2} ~ \frac{\Delta r}{R} + \cdots$$

The first term is the gravitational acceleration due to M at the center of the reference body $m$, i.e., at the point where $\Delta r$ is zero. This term does not affect the observed acceleration of particles on the surface of m because with respect to M, m (and everything on its surface) is in free fall. When the force on the far particle is subtracted from the force on the near particle, this first term cancels, as do all other even-order terms. The remaining (residual) terms represent the difference mentioned above and are tidal force (acceleration) terms. When ∆r is small compared to R, the terms after the first residual term are very small and can be neglected, giving the approximate tidal acceleration $\vec{a}_{t,\text{axial}}$ for the distances ∆r considered, along the axis joining the centers of m and M:

$$\vec{a}_{t,\text{axial}} \approx \pm \hat{r} ~ 2 \Delta r ~ G ~ \frac{M}{R^3}$$

When calculated in this way for the case where ∆r is a distance along the axis joining the centers of m and M, $\vec{a}_t$ is directed outwards from to the center of m (where ∆r is zero).

Tidal accelerations can also be calculated away from the axis connecting the bodies m and M, requiring a vector calculation. In the plane perpendicular to that axis, the tidal acceleration is directed inwards (towards the center where ∆r is zero), and its magnitude is $\frac{1}{2}\left|\vec{a}_{t,\text{axial}} \right|$ in linear approximation as in Figure 2.

The tidal accelerations at the surfaces of planets in the Solar System are generally very small. For example, the lunar tidal acceleration at the Earth's surface along the Moon–Earth axis is about 1.1×10^{−7} g, while the solar tidal acceleration at the Earth's surface along the Sun–Earth axis is about 0.52×10^{−7} g, where g is the gravitational acceleration at the Earth's surface. Hence the tide-raising force (acceleration) due to the Sun is about 45% of that due to the Moon. The solar tidal acceleration at the Earth's surface was first given by Newton in the Principia.

== See also ==
- Amphidromic point
- Disrupted planet
- Galactic tide
- Tidal resonance
- Tidal stripping
- Tidal tensor
- Spacetime curvature
