= Glen Ellen, California =

Glen Ellen
- Census designated place
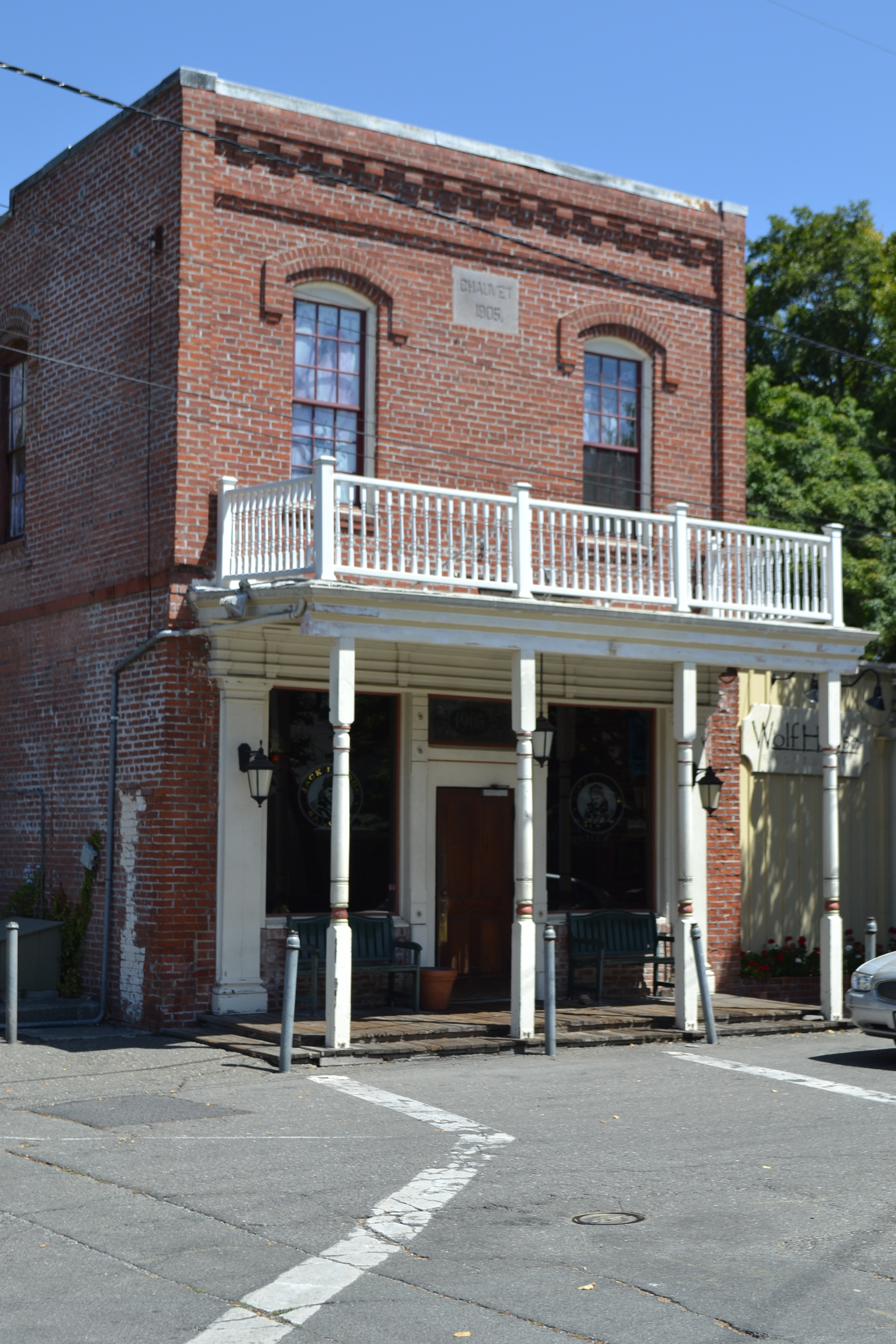
- Glen Ellen Saloon

- Location in Sonoma County and the state of California

- Location in the United States
- Coordinates: 38°21′52″N 122°31′52″W
- Country: United States
- State: California
- County: Sonoma

Area
  - Total: 2.101 sq mi (5.441 km^{2})
  - Land: 2.100 sq mi (5.439 km^{2})
  - Water: 0.0012 sq mi (0.003 km^{2}) 0.05%
- Elevation: 253 ft (77 m)

Population (April 1, 2020)
  - Total: 714
  - Density: 340/sq mi (131/km^{2})
- Time zone: UTC-8 (Pacific)
  - Summer (DST): UTC-7 (PDT)
- ZIP code: 95442
- Area code: 707
- FIPS code: 06-30028
- GNIS feature ID: 277524

Glen Ellen is a census-designated place (CDP) in Sonoma Valley, Sonoma County, California, United States. The population was 714 at the 2020 census, down from 784 at the 2010 census. Glen Ellen is the location of Jack London State Historic Park (including the Wolf House), Sonoma Valley Regional Park, and a former home of Hunter S. Thompson.

The whole of Glen Ellen was severely damaged by the Nuns Fire during the October 2017 Northern California wildfires.

== History ==
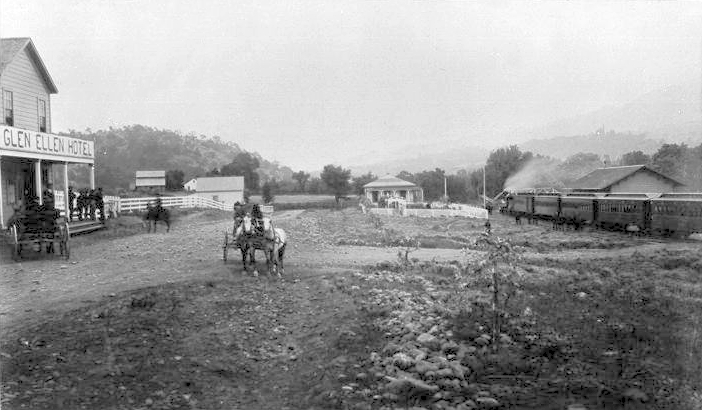
Glen Ellen, 1888

In 1859, Charles V. Stuart purchased a part of the Rancho Agua Caliente land grant and in 1868 began building a house there, eventually establishing a 1,000-acre (4.0 km^{2}) vineyard he named Glen Ellen after his wife. The town that grew up around the vineyard also came to be called Glen Ellen, and Stuart's home was later renamed Glen Oaks Ranch.

In October 2017, the area was badly affected by wildfire.

== Geography ==
Glen Ellen is about 6 miles (9.7 km) northwest of the city of Sonoma. The United States Census Bureau fixes the total area at 2.1 square miles (5.4 km^{2}), 99.95% of it land and 0.05% covered by water. Sonoma Creek, the principal river of the Sonoma Valley, flows through Glen Ellen.

== Demographics ==
Historical population
Census	Pop.	Note	%±
1980	1,014		—
1990	1,191		17.5%
2000	992		−16.7%
2010	784		−21.0%
2020	714		−8.9%
U.S. Decennial Census; 1860–1870 1880-1890; 1900 1910 1920; 1930 1940 1950; 1960 1970 1980; 1990 2000 2010; 2020

Glen Ellen first appeared as a census designated place in the 1980 United States census.

=== Racial and ethnic composition ===
Glen Ellen CDP, California – Racial and ethnic composition Note: the US Census treats Hispanic/Latino as an ethnic category. This table excludes Latinos from the racial categories and assigns them to a separate category. Hispanics/Latinos may be of any race.
Race / Ethnicity (NH = Non-Hispanic)	Pop 2000	Pop 2010	Pop 2020	% 2000	% 2010	% 2020
White alone (NH)	841	656	553	84.78%	83.67%	77.45%
Black or African American alone (NH)	18	3	2	1.81%	0.38%	0.28%
Native American or Alaska Native alone (NH)	9	6	7	0.91%	0.77%	0.98%
Asian alone (NH)	11	15	22	1.11%	1.91%	3.08%
Native Hawaiian or Pacific Islander alone (NH)	4	3	2	0.40%	0.38%	0.28%
Other race alone (NH)	1	5	3	0.10%	0.64%	0.42%
Mixed race or Multiracial (NH)	24	29	34	2.42%	3.70%	4.76%
Hispanic or Latino (any race)	84	67	91	8.47%	8.55%	12.75%
Total	992	784	714	100.00%	100.00%	100.00%

=== 2020 ===
The 2020 United States census reported that Glen Ellen had a population of 714. The population density was 340.0 inhabitants per square mile (131.3/km^{2}). The racial makeup of Glen Ellen was 567 (79.4%) White, 2 (0.3%) African American, 7 (1.0%) Native American, 22 (3.1%) Asian, 2 (0.3%) Pacific Islander, 39 (5.5%) from other races, and 75 (10.5%) from two or more races. Hispanic or Latino of any race were 91 persons (12.7%).

The census reported that 96.8% of the population lived in households, 3.2% lived in non-institutionalized group quarters, and no one was institutionalized.

There were 316 households, out of which 54 (17.1%) had children under the age of 18 living in them, 153 (48.4%) were married-couple households, 22 (7.0%) were cohabiting couple households, 85 (26.9%) had a female householder with no partner present, and 56 (17.7%) had a male householder with no partner present. 96 households (30.4%) were one person, and 58 (18.4%) were one person aged 65 or older. The average household size was 2.19. There were 196 families (62.0% of all households).

The age distribution was 80 people (11.2%) under the age of 18, 33 people (4.6%) aged 18 to 24, 148 people (20.7%) aged 25 to 44, 201 people (28.2%) aged 45 to 64, and 252 people (35.3%) who were 65 years of age or older. The median age was 56.8 years. For every 100 females, there were 94.6 males.

There were 408 housing units at an average density of 194.3 units per square mile (75.0 units/km^{2}), of which 316 (77.5%) were occupied. Of these, 217 (68.7%) were owner-occupied, and 99 (31.3%) were occupied by renters.

=== 2010 ===
The 2010 United States census reported that Glen Ellen had a population of 784. The population density was 372.7 inhabitants per square mile (143.9/km^{2}). The racial makeup of Glen Ellen was 693 (88.4%) White, 3 (0.4%) African American, 9 (1.1%) Native American, 16 (2.0%) Asian, 3 (0.4%) Pacific Islander, 18 (2.3%) from other races, and 42 (5.4%) from two or more races. Hispanic or Latino of any race were 67 persons (8.5%).

The Census reported that 98.3% of the population lived in households and 1.7% lived in non-institutionalized group quarters.

There were 364 households, out of which 74 (20.3%) had children under the age of 18 living in them, 172 (47.3%) were opposite-sex married couples living together, 26 (7.1%) had a female householder with no husband present, 14 (3.8%) had a male householder with no wife present. There were 23 (6.3%) unmarried opposite-sex partnerships, and 6 (1.6%) same-sex married couples or partnerships. 122 households (33.5%) were made up of individuals, and 34 (9.3%) had someone living alone who was 65 years of age or older. The average household size was 2.12. There were 212 families (58.2% of all households); the average family size was 2.67.

The population was spread out, with 126 people (16.1%) under the age of 18, 37 people (4.7%) aged 18 to 24, 142 people (18.1%) aged 25 to 44, 376 people (48.0%) aged 45 to 64, and 103 people (13.1%) who were 65 years of age or older. The median age was 51.4 years. For every 100 females, there were 103.6 males. For every 100 females age 18 and over, there were 101.2 males.

There were 421 housing units at an average density of 200.2 per square mile (77.3/km^{2}), of which 60.4% were owner-occupied and 39.6% were occupied by renters. The homeowner vacancy rate was 1.3%; the rental vacancy rate was 4.0%. 60.5% of the population lived in owner-occupied housing units and 37.9% lived in rental housing units.

== Points of interest ==
Writer Jack London lived in Glen Ellen from 1909 to his death in 1916, where he devoted much of his time to development of his Beauty Ranch and the building of his mansion, Wolf House. Many of his novels and stories, notably The Iron Heel and The Valley of the Moon mention Glen Ellen and Sonoma County. ("The Valley of the Moon" is a translation of Sonoma Valley's name given by the Pomo and Coast Miwok peoples.)

The site of his ranch is now Jack London State Historic Park, which contains the ruins of Wolf House, several ranch buildings, the grave of Jack and Charmian London, and a museum housed in Charmian London's "House of Happy Walls".

The Sonoma Developmental Center is located just outside Glen Ellen near the Jack London ranch. Its predecessor, the California Home for the Care and Training of Feeble Minded Children, was the setting for Jack London's story "Told in the Drooling Ward."

Glen Ellen is located in the Wine Country and is part of the Sonoma Mountain AVA. Like all the communities in Sonoma Valley, Glen Ellen is home to many vineyards and wineries including B.R. Cohn Winery, Benziger Family Winery, Mayo Family Winery, and Valley of the Moon Winery.

Quarryhill Botanic Garden, located near Glen Ellen, is a research botanical garden housing with one of the largest collections of temperate Asian plants in North America. Quarryhill's collection includes rare species such as Acer pentaphyllum, Cornus capitata, Holboellia coriacea, Illicium simonsii, and Rosa chinensis var. spontanea, all native to Sichuan, China, as well as extensive collections of various wild Asian dogwoods, lilies, magnolias, maples, oaks, roses, and rhododendrons. Quarryhill is open to the public.

Dunbar Elementary School was the second oldest school in California, until it closed in 2023.

== Government ==
In the California State Legislature, Glen Ellen is in the 3rd senatorial district, represented by Democrat Christopher Cabaldon, and in the 12th Assembly district, represented by Democrat Damon Connolly.

In the United States House of Representatives, Glen Ellen is in California's 4th congressional district, represented by Democrat Mike Thompson.

== Education ==
The school district is Sonoma Valley Unified School District.

== Notable people ==
- Mary Ellen Pleasant, abolitionist, entrepreneur
- M. F. K. Fisher, food writer
- Albert E. Kahn, journalist, photographer, and author
- Bernie Krause, musician and soundscape ecologist
- John Lasseter, animator, film director, screenwriter, and producer
- Ada Limón, United States Poet Laureate, 2022–25
- Jack London, novelist, journalist, and social activist
- Tilden Daken, landscape painter and California Impressionist
- Hunter S. Thompson, journalist and author
- Nikita Ducarroz, BMX freestyle cyclist and Olympic medalist
- Chandler Lucy, musician

== See also ==
- Glen Ellyn
- Lake Suttonfield
- Arnold Drive Bridge
