= Earthquake sensitivity =

Alleged natural human ability to predict earthquakes

Earthquake sensitivity and earthquake sensitive are pseudoscientific terms defined by Jim Berkland to refer to certain people who claim sensitivity to the precursors of impending earthquakes, manifested in "dreams or visions, psychic impressions, or physiological symptoms", the latter including "ear tones" (ringing in the ears), headaches, and agitation. It is claimed that "[a] person with a very sensitive body may also have some subtle reaction to whatever animals react to". Proponents have speculated that these may result from: 1) piezoelectric effects due to changes in the stress of the Earth's crust, 2) low-frequency electromagnetic signals, or 3) from the emission of radon gas.

Although proponents suggest the possibility that the claimed effects might work through known physical phenomena, and thus be amenable to scientific study, these claims are pseudoscientific in that no evidence of such effects, nor any theory of how such effects might be perceived, has been presented in the scientific literature. What the scientific literature does have is various reports showing that animals do not show disturbed or altered behavior attributable to earthquake precursors (other than foreshocks). Aside from whether such phenomena can be detected (by any means), the "consistent failure to find reliable earthquake precursors" has led many scientists to question whether such precursor phenomena even exist.

Could "earthquake sensitives" be responding to some kind of "psychic impressions" or other paranormal phenomena as yet unknown to science? After reviewing the scientific literature the International Commission on Earthquake Forecasting for Civil Protection (ICEF) concluded that

there is no credible scientific evidence that animals display behaviors indicative of earthquake-related environmental disturbances that are unobservable by the physical and chemical sensor systems available to earthquake scientists.

On their side, the proponents claim that there have been "many scientific papers" supporting their views, but "most have been totally rejected by the keepers of high wisdom." While scientists are quick to dismiss theories they "know, or have good reason to believe, are not credible", and especially predictions by amateurs on account of their lack of scientific rigor, proponents claim that successful predictions can indicate a significant breakthrough, even if the details are not understood. In this regard Berkland claims "a 75 percent accuracy rate of forecasting quakes." However, these results (besides being disputed) are irrelevant in demonstrating any kind of "earthquake sensitive" effect as Berkland's predictions appear to not involve such effects.

Berkland ceased posting his predictions after June 2010. Though a few others have continued to post their predictions on Berkland's website, there appears to be no effort to correlate "ear tones" or any other physiological effect with subsequent earthquakes.

== See also ==
- Earthquake prediction

== Sources ==
- Berkland, Jim (November 29, 1990), "Bring in the Clowns", Report to the California Commission of Earthquake Preparedness and Natural Hazards, archived from the original on March 7, 2016.
- Brodsky, Emily E.; Lay, Thorne (16 May 2014), "Recognizing Foreshocks from the 1 April 2014 Chile Earthquake", Science, 344 (6185): 700–702, Bibcode:2014Sci...344..700B, doi:10.1126/science.1255202, PMID 24833379, S2CID 206558321.
- Geller, Robert J. (December 1997), "Earthquake prediction: a critical review.", Geophysical Journal International, 131 (3): 425–450, Bibcode:1997GeoJI.131..425G, doi:10.1111/j.1365-246X.1997.tb06588.x.
- Geller, Robert J.; Jackson, David D.; Kagan, Yan Y.; Mulargia, Francesco (14 March 1997), "Earthquakes Cannot Be Predicted" (PDF), Science, 275 (5306): 1616, doi:10.1126/science.275.5306.1616, S2CID 123516228, archived from the original (PDF) on 12 May 2019.
- Hough, Susan (2010), Predicting the Unpredictable: The Tumultuous Science of Earthquake Prediction, Princeton University Press, ISBN 978-0-691-13816-9.
- Hunter, Roger (September 2006), "Can Jim Berkland predict earthquakes?", Skeptical Inquirer, vol. 30, no. 5, pp. 47–50, archived from the original on 2016-03-07.
- International Commission on Earthquake Forecasting for Civil Protection (30 May 2011), "Operational Earthquake Forecasting: State of Knowledge and Guidelines for Utilization", Annals of Geophysics, 54 (4): 315–391, doi:10.4401/ag-5350, hdl:20.500.11820/6552f865-6e59-47f1-a5ec-b7446bfd1a82.
- Kenagy, G. J.; Enright, J. T. (1979), "Animal Behavior as a Predictor of Earthquakes: An Analysis of Rodent Activity", Open-File Report 80-453, United States Geological Survey.
- Lighton, John R.B.; Duncan, Frances D. (15 August 2005), "Shaken, not stirred: a serendipitous study of ants and earthquakes" (PDF), Journal of Experimental Biology, 208 (16): 3103–3107, doi:10.1242/jeb.01735, PMID 16081608.
- Lindberg, Robert G.; Skiles, Durward; Hayden, Page (1981), "Can animals predict earthquakes? A search for correlations between changes in activity patterns of two fossorial rodents and subsequent seismic events" (PDF), Open-File Report 81-385, United States Geological Survey.
- Matthews, Robert A. J. (December 1997), "Decision-theoretic limits on earthquake prediction", Geophysical Journal International, 131 (3): 526–529, Bibcode:1997GeoJI.131..526M, doi:10.1111/j.1365-246X.1997.tb06596.x.
- McClellan, Patrick H. (May 1980), "Preearthquake Animal Behavior, A Closer Look for Alternative Causes", Geophysical Research Letters, 7 (5): 333–336, Bibcode:1980GeoRL...7..333M, doi:10.1029/gl007i005p00333.
- Mulargia, Francesco; Gasperini, Paolo (1992), "Evaluating the statistical validity beyond chance of 'VAN' earthquake precursors", Geophysical Journal International, 111 (1): 32–44, Bibcode:1992GeoJI.111...32M, doi:10.1111/j.1365-246X.1992.tb00552.x.
- Orey, Cal (2006), The Man Who Predicts Earthquakes: Jim Berkland, Maverick Geologist: How His Quake Warnings Can Save Lives, Sentient Publications, ISBN 9781591810360.
- Otis, Leon; Kautz, William (1979), "Biological premonitions of earthquakes: a validation study – Proceedings of Conference XI: Abnormal Animal Behavior Prior to Earthquakes, II", Open-File Report 80-453, United States Geological Survey, pp. 225–226.
- Schaal, Rand B. (February 1988). "An evaluation of the animal-behavior theory for earthquake predictions" (PDF). California Geology (FTP). pp. 41–45. (To view documents see Help:FTP).
- Shermer, Michael (1997), Why People Believe Weird Things: Pseudoscience, Superstition, and Other Confusions of Our Time, W.H. Freeman and Company, ISBN 0-7167-3090-1.
- Zechar, J. Douglas; Jordan, Thomas H. (2008), "Testing alarm-based earthquake predictions", Geophysical Journal International, 172 (2): 715–724, Bibcode:2008GeoJI.172..715Z, doi:10.1111/j.1365-246X.2007.03676.x.
