= Lake Suttonfield =

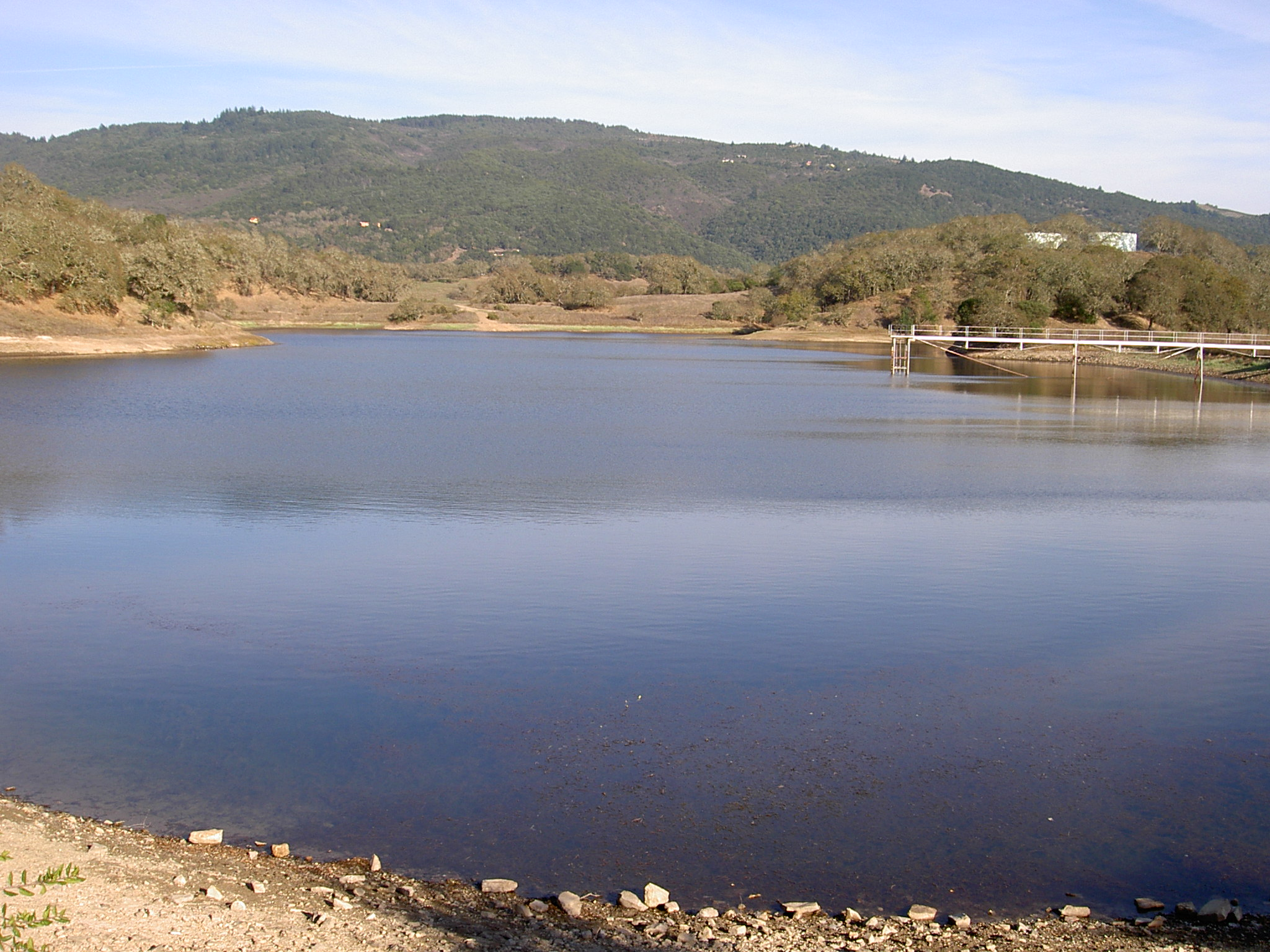

- Location within California Location within the United States
- Location: Sonoma County, California
- Coordinates: 38.3543°N 122.517°W
- Type: Reservoir
- Primary outflows: a tributary of Sonoma Creek
- Basin countries: United States
- Max. length: 600 yd (500 m)
- Surface elevation: 299 ft (91 m)
- Islands: none
- Settlements: Glen Ellen, California

Lake Suttonfield (or Suttonfield Lake) is a reservoir about 0.5 miles (0.8 km) southeast of Glen Ellen in the Sonoma Valley of Sonoma County, California, United States. It is situated between the Sonoma Valley Regional Park and the Sonoma Developmental Center. Despite its small size, it is a well-known center for amphibians and other wildlife.

== See also ==
- List of dams and reservoirs in California
- List of lakes in California
- List of lakes in the San Francisco Bay Area
