= Charles V. Stuart =

California pioneer

Charles V. Stuart (May 9, 1819 – August 13, 1880) was a California pioneer and delegate to the California Constitutional Convention of 1878-79, where he distinguished himself as the only delegate to speak out in defense of the rights of Chinese immigrants.

== Life ==
=== In Pennsylvania and New York ===
Stuart was born in Nippenose Township, Pennsylvania, and worked on his father's farm until the age of 14, when he was enrolled at Owego Academy in what is now Tioga, New York, where he studied under the educational reformer Charles Rittenhouse Coburn. After graduating, Stuart moved to Ithaca, New York, where he began work as a merchant. In 1839, Stuart took a grand tour of the United States and in 1842, married Ellen Mary Tourtellot. The Stuarts had three children while living in the east: Robert H. Stuart (d. 1878), Mary (Stuart) Pickett, and Emily (Stuart) Stangroom.

=== In California ===
Inspired by the California Gold Rush, Stuart led the first mule train—called the "Ithaca Company"—to California, beginning from Independence, Missouri and traveling along the Arkansas River to the Rocky Mountains, and then to Salt Lake City, where after a brief recuperation, the expedition traveled to the Cajon Pass, near what is now Rancho Cucamonga, California. From there, the travelers headed to Los Angeles, the San Fernando Valley, and San Joaquin, California, where the members separated to find their own way. Stuart headed to San Francisco, where he arrived on November 20, 1849.

In San Francisco, Stuart and partners I.N. Thorne and John Center began farming 40 acres (160,000 m^{2}) of land in the vicinity of the Mission Dolores. They constructed a house and dug a canal several hundred feet long to accommodate boats on the nearby creek. Shortly afterwards, Stuart and business partner Robert T. Ridley established a tavern on the site, called the "Mansion House." The tavern (located on the site now occupied by the basilica) was successful, and Stuart continued operating it after Ridley's death in 1851. Stuart was able to afford to build San Francisco's first brick house on the corner of 16th and Capp Streets. By the mid-1850s, Stuart was living there with his wife, son Charles Duff Stuart (b. 1854), and daughters Antoinette (Stuart) Vermehr (b. 1856), Ida (Stuart) Sessions (b. 1859) and Isabel (Stuart) Dennis (b. 1863).

Stuart was elected to San Francisco's first Board of Aldermen and ran for a seat in the state assembly in 1854. He tried to lease the New Almaden quicksilver mine—the state's most financially successful mine—but sold his interest in the mine to escape the extremely complicated litigation over its ownership.

In 1859, Stuart purchased a part of the Rancho Agua Caliente land grant in Sonoma County and in 1868 began building a house there, eventually establishing a 1,000-acre (4.0 km^{2}) vineyard he named Glen Ellen after his wife. The town that grew up around the vineyard also came to be called Glen Ellen, and Stuart's home was later renamed Glen Oaks Ranch.

In 1878, when California held its second constitutional convention, Stuart was elected as a delegate on the non-partisan ticket. He spoke rarely in the Convention, most notably in two impassioned speeches defending the rights of Chinese immigrants against various discriminatory provisions proposed by the convention delegates. The first of these speeches occurred on December 9, 1878, in opposition to proposals to ban Chinese immigrants from owning property in the state, or from being employed by any state corporation. Again, on February 1, 1879, when the convention was finalizing the Constitution's language, Stuart spoke against such provisions, declaring,

Give to the children of these people (and some of them native born) the privilege of our common schools in return for the school taxes they pay; cease persecuting them by personal assault, to which the law is blind; stop this disgraceful special legislation against them; stop this relentless, heartless, and inhuman persecution of foreigners...and then, and only then, will we do our duty. What right has the State to exact of these men poll and other school taxes, and then legislate against them, prohibiting their children the privilege of her common schools? Why pass and continue to pass arbitrary and oppressive laws against them? Why does the State fail to protect them from murder, arson, and outrage? I charge the city of San Francisco with cowardice in not protecting them in the exercise of their rights of "life, liberty, and the pursuit of happiness," which all men are guaranteed under our flag; while they have collected millions of dollars in taxes, licenses, and otherwise, yet they furnish them no protection in return. They pass cruel ordinances against them; they harass and annoy them through every device the law can invent, and why are similar outrages heaped upon them in nearly every county, town, village, or hamlet in this state? Tell me; tell me; oh, tell me, why they are not protected like others in their honest toil? Or is this to be the final sum of all villainy? In case the outrages on these people do not cease in this state, and it refuses longer to protect them, then I call upon our Government to give them the ballot, that they may protect themselves. If it does not, then I demand the repeal of all naturalization laws, and to modify all immigration laws, with other nations, under the treaty making power.

Although Stuart was ridiculed and attacked for this speech, the convention failed to approve the provisions to which he objected, and many of the later laws enacted restricting the rights of the Chinese were declared unconstitutional by federal courts. Nevertheless, persecution of the Chinese worsened over the next half-century in California and other west coast states.

== Death ==
After Stuart's death in 1880, his wife Ellen Stuart continued to operate the vineyard. She banded together with two other widows who petitioned the Sonoma County Superior Court for the right to operate their businesses as “sole traders,” the designation needed to legally conduct business in the state as women. Their son, Charles Duff Stuart, became an author, publishing a novel, Casa Grande, in 1906. The Stuart home, Glen Oaks Ranch, is still standing in Glen Ellen, California.
