= Rancho Tzabaco =

Historic California rancho

Coordinates: 38.70°N 122.93°W

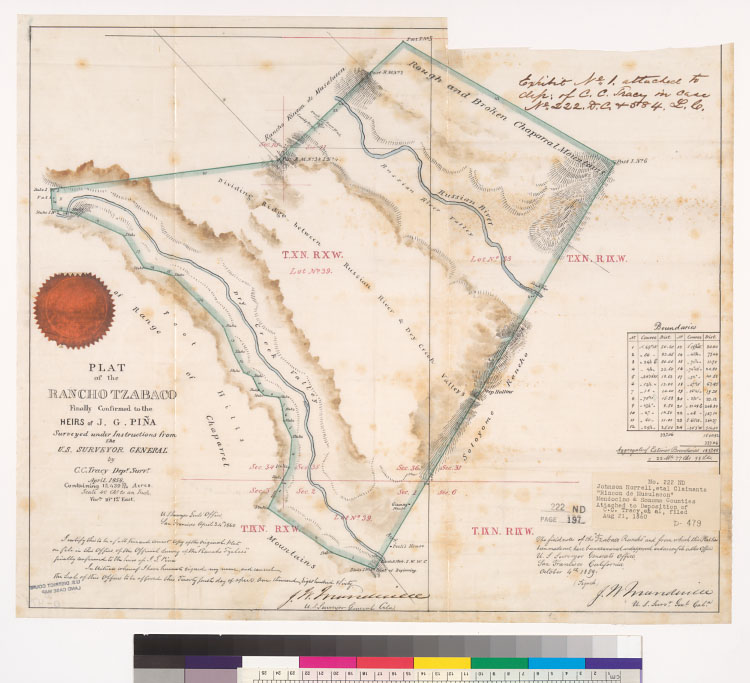
Map of Rancho Tzabaco in 1858

Rancho Tzabaco was a 15,439-acre (62.48 km^{2}) Mexican land grant in present-day Sonoma County, California given in 1843 by Governor Manuel Micheltorena to José German Piña (often misspelled as "Pena" in historical documents). The grant extended along Dry Creek, a tributary of the Russian River, north west of present-day Healdsburg and encompassed present-day Geyserville and the Dry Creek Valley AVA. The grant was immediately north of Henry D. Fitch's Rancho Sotoyome.

== History ==
José German Piña (1829–1847), son of Lázaro Piña (died 1847), a soldier who had come to California in 1819 and grantee of Rancho Agua Caliente, received the four square league Rancho Tzabaco grant in 1843. By 1846 German Pina and his brothers were running the rancho. José German Pina died in 1847, leaving an undivided one fifth share to each of his four surviving brothers (José de Jesús (born 1826), Francisco (born 1831), Antonio (1831–1853), and Luis (born 1834)) and a sister Clara (born 1836).

With the cession of California to the United States following the Mexican-American War, the 1848 Treaty of Guadalupe Hidalgo provided that the land grants would be honored. As required by the Land Act of 1851, a claim for Rancho Tzabaco was filed with the Public Land Commission in 1852, and the grant was patented to José de Jesús Piña et al., heirs of José German Pina, in 1859.

From 1850 onward the Piña family fell into increasing debt. Led by Elisha Ely in 1851, American squatters began to settle on the grant. In 1853, Antonio Piña was murdered by squatters. General Vallejo was named executor of the estate.

Several months after the murder of their brother, two of the Piña brothers signed over their entire interest in Rancho Tzabaco to John B. Frisbie, an American lawyer and real estate speculator who was also acting as their attorney. Frisbie was also the son-in-law of General Vallejo. The deal was that the Piñas were to maintain possession for five years. There were squatter uprisings when Frisbie took possession in 1858.

For many years afterwards the surviving Pina family members made court appeals to regain their land. Antonio Piña's daughter, Maria Antonia Piña, filed a claim to her murdered father's estate in 1862. The courts denied the claim because she was illegitimate. German's sister, Clara Piña married Guillermo (William) Fitch, whose relatives owned the adjacent Rancho Sotoyome.

Duvall Drake Phillips with a partner, Sam Heaton, purchased 160-acre (0.65 km^{2}) of Rancho Tzabaco in 1856.
