= Arnold Drive Bridge =

Historic truss bridge in Eldridge, California, USA

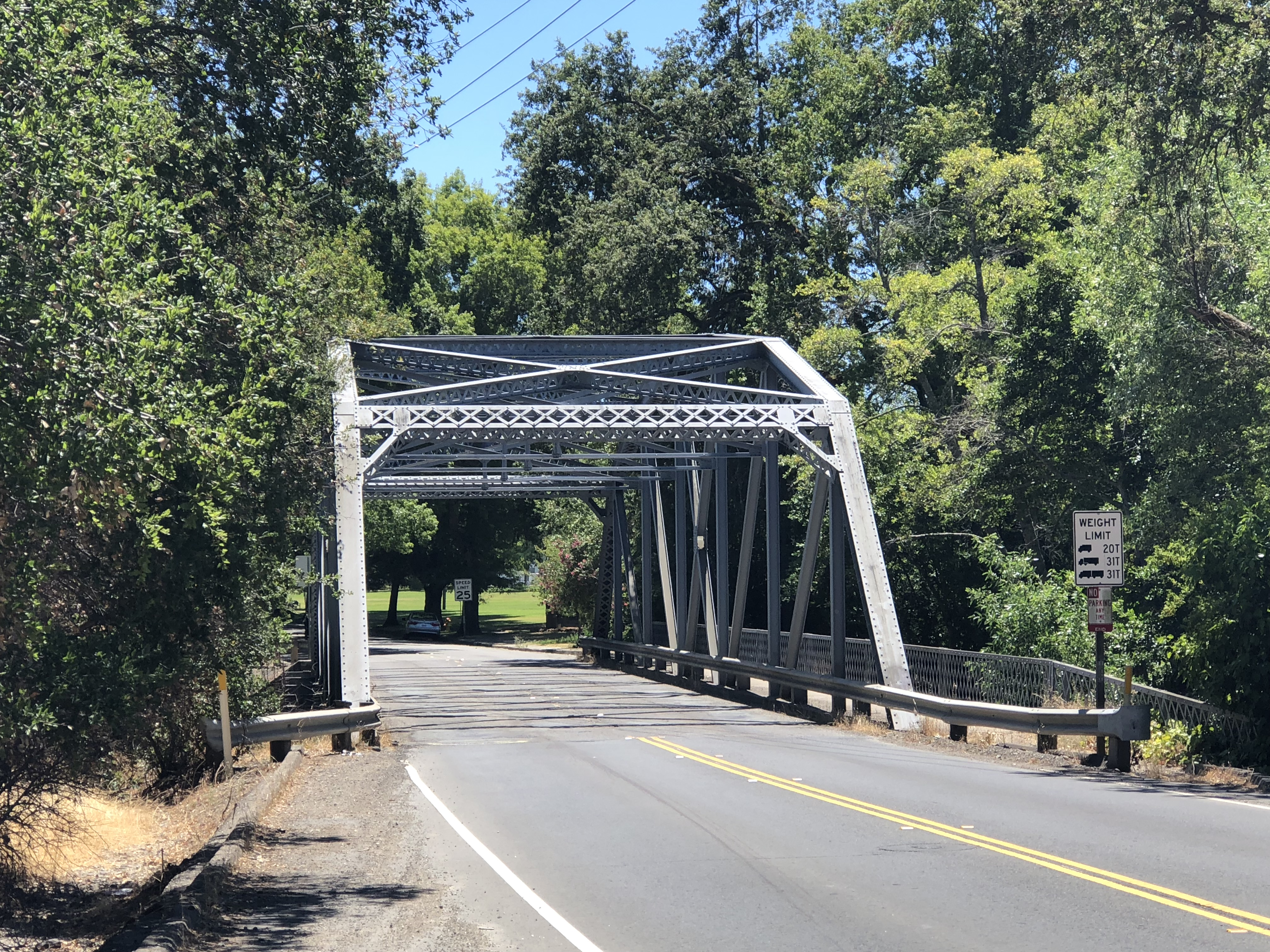
- Arnold Drive Bridge in 2018
- Coordinates: 38.35083°N 122.51889°W
- Carries: Arnold Drive
- Crosses: Sonoma Creek
- Official name: Arnold Drive Bridge
- Maintained by: County of Sonoma

Characteristics
- Design: Truss bridge
- Total length: 143.1 ft (43.6 m)
- No. of spans: 1

History
- Opened: 1930; 96 years ago

Location
- Interactive map of Arnold Drive Bridge

The Arnold Drive Bridge (also called the Jim Berkland Memorial Bridge and the Sonoma Creek Bridge) is a historic truss bridge in Eldridge, California in the United States. The bridge was built in 1930 over Sonoma Creek. The bridge serves as a connecting point between Eldridge and the village of Glen Ellen. In 1998, the bridge was named a historic bridge by the Sonoma League for Historic Preservation and was named a historic landmark by the County of Sonoma.

== History ==
The Arnold Drive Bridge was built in 1930 over Sonoma Creek to replace a collapsed bridge made of concrete. The bridge is maintained by the County of Sonoma. On average, 13,900 cars travel over the bridge daily.

The bridge had fallen into disrepair by 2000 and the County of Sonoma planned to tear the bridge down and replace it with a concrete bridge. Glen Ellen resident Jim Berkland, who used to play on and around the bridge as a child in the 1940s, collected signatures and filed a petition to the county, who agreed to maintain the bridge rather than tear it down. In 2020, the bridge was memorialized as the Jim Berkland Memorial Bridge.

While the bridge is not eligible for the National Register of Historic Places, the bridge is recognized as historic by the Sonoma League of Historic Preservation and is listed as historic landmark #169 by the County of Sonoma.

== Design ==
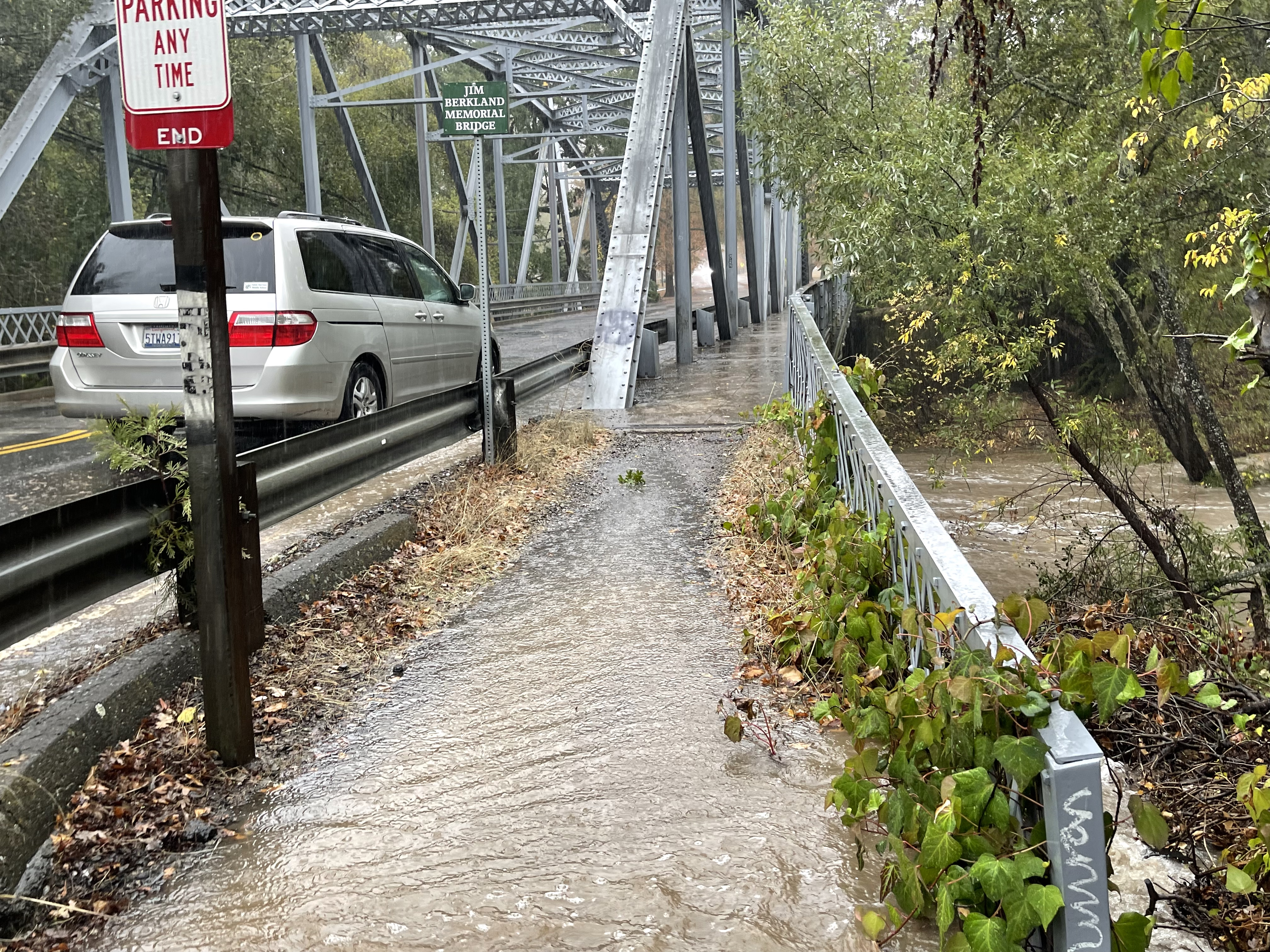
Flooding of the bridge during the October 2021 atmospheric river storm in California.

The 143.1-foot (43.6 m), steel bridge was designed in the Parker Through truss style. The deck is made of cast-in-place concrete with bituminous surface.
