= Eldridge, California =

Eldridge
- census-designated place
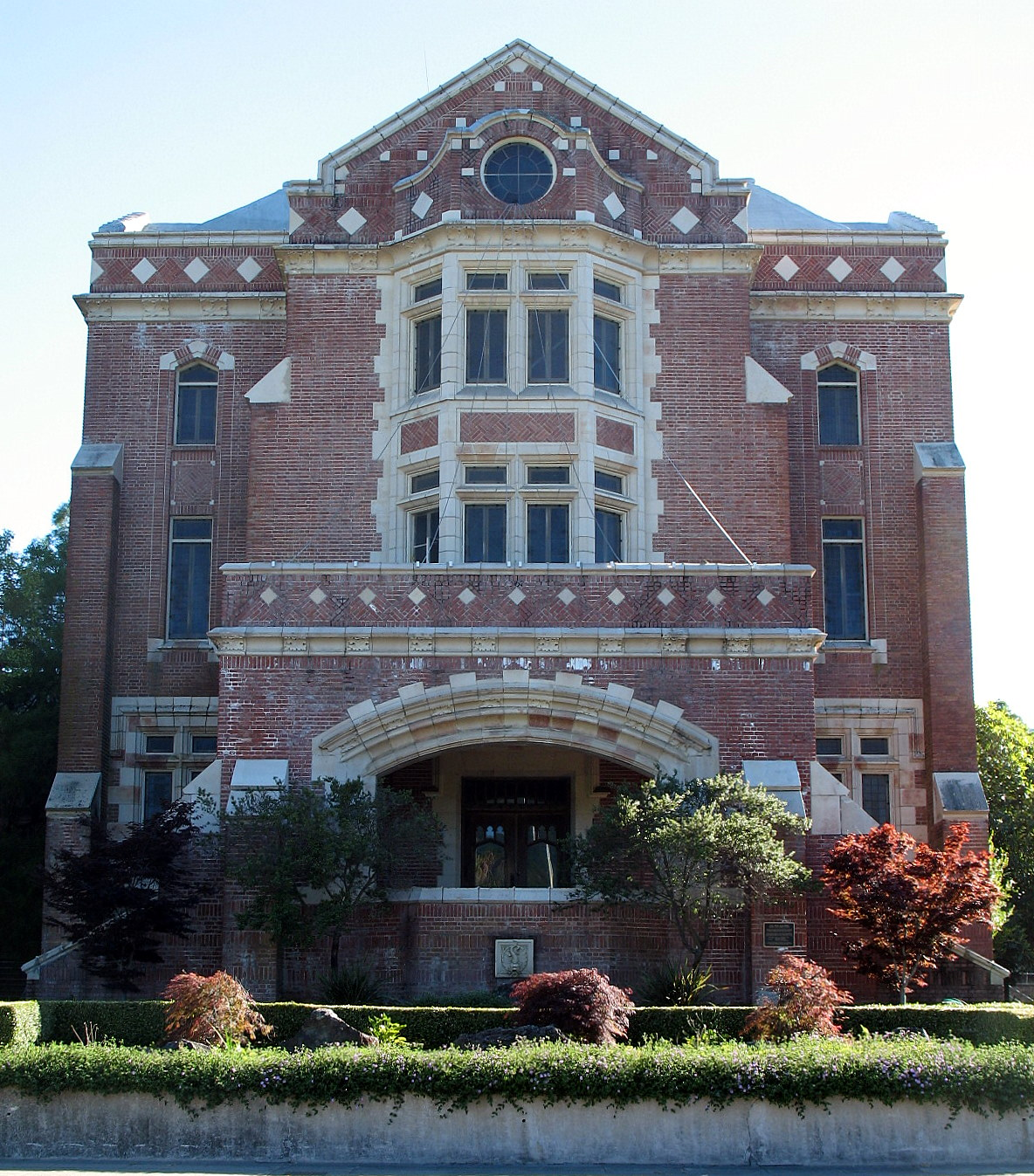
- Sonoma Developmental Center

- Location in Sonoma County and the state of California
- Coordinates: 38°20′31″N 122°30′43″W
- Country: United States
- State: California
- County: Sonoma

Area
  - Total: 0.652 sq mi (1.689 km^{2})
  - Land: 0.652 sq mi (1.689 km^{2})
  - Water: 0 sq mi (0 km^{2}) 0%
- Elevation: 177 ft (54 m)

Population (2020)
  - Total: 1,312
  - Density: 2,012/sq mi (776.8/km^{2})
- Time zone: UTC-8 (PST)
  - Summer (DST): UTC-7 (PDT)
- ZIP code: 95431
- Area code: 707
- FIPS code: 06-21894
- GNIS feature ID: 1701268

Eldridge is a census-designated place (CDP) in Sonoma County, California, United States. The population was 1,312 at the 2020 census. It was notably the home to the Sonoma Developmental Center, the largest facility serving the needs of persons with developmental disabilities in the state.

== History ==
Eldridge is named for James Eldridge, who owned part of the Rancho Cabeza de Santa Rosa land grant.

== Geography ==
According to the United States Census Bureau, the CDP has a total area of 0.7 square miles (1.8 km^{2}), all land.

== Demographics ==
Historical population
Census	Pop.	Note	%±
1990	1,144		—
2000	1,534		34.1%
2010	1,233		−19.6%
2020	1,312		6.4%
U.S. Decennial Census; 1860–1870 1880-1890; 1900 1910 1920; 1930 1940 1950; 1960 1970 1980; 1990 2000 2010; 2020

Eldridge first appeared as a census designated place in the 1990 U.S. census.

=== Racial and ethnic composition ===
Eldridge CDP, California – Racial and ethnic composition Note: the US Census treats Hispanic/Latino as an ethnic category. This table excludes Latinos from the racial categories and assigns them to a separate category. Hispanics/Latinos may be of any race.
Race / Ethnicity (NH = Non-Hispanic)	Pop 2000	Pop 2010	Pop 2020	% 2000	% 2010	% 2020
White alone (NH)	1,187	823	647	77.38%	66.75%	49.31%
Black or African American alone (NH)	27	9	8	1.76%	0.73%	0.61%
Native American or Alaska Native alone (NH)	8	2	2	0.52%	0.16%	0.15%
Asian alone (NH)	43	36	32	2.80%	2.92%	2.44%
Native Hawaiian or Pacific Islander alone (NH)	2	6	10	0.13%	0.49%	0.76%
Other race alone (NH)	2	1	10	0.13%	0.08%	0.76%
Mixed race or Multiracial (NH)	51	31	53	3.32%	2.51%	4.04%
Hispanic or Latino (any race)	214	325	550	13.95%	26.36%	41.92%
Total	1,534	1,233	1,312	100.00%	100.00%	100.00%

=== 2020 census ===
As of the 2020 census, Eldridge had a population of 1,312 and a population density of 2,012.3 inhabitants per square mile (777.0/km^{2}).

The age distribution was 289 people (22.0%) under the age of 18, 102 people (7.8%) aged 18 to 24, 328 people (25.0%) aged 25 to 44, 313 people (23.9%) aged 45 to 64, and 280 people (21.3%) who were 65 years of age or older. The median age was 40.8 years. For every 100 females, there were 92.9 males, and for every 100 females age 18 and over there were 88.7 males age 18 and over.

The census reported that 1,310 people (99.8% of the population) lived in households and 2 (0.2%) were institutionalized. In total, 100.0% of residents lived in urban areas, while 0.0% lived in rural areas.

There were 501 households, out of which 129 (25.7%) had children under the age of 18 living in them. Of all households, 250 (49.9%) were married-couple households, 54 (10.8%) were cohabiting couple households, 107 (21.4%) had a female householder with no spouse or partner present, and 90 (18.0%) had a male householder with no spouse or partner present. A total of 135 households (26.9%) were one person, and 64 (12.8%) were one person aged 65 or older. The average household size was 2.61. There were 323 families (64.5% of all households).

There were 558 housing units at an average density of 855.8 units per square mile (330.4 units/km^{2}), of which 501 (89.8%) were occupied and 57 (10.2%) were vacant. Of these, 287 (57.3%) were owner-occupied and 214 (42.7%) were occupied by renters. The homeowner vacancy rate was 3.0% and the rental vacancy rate was 7.8%.

Racial composition as of the 2020 census
Race	Number	Percent
White	692	52.7%
Black or African American	8	0.6%
American Indian and Alaska Native	20	1.5%
Asian	32	2.4%
Native Hawaiian and Other Pacific Islander	10	0.8%
Some other race	312	23.8%
Two or more races	238	18.1%

=== Income and poverty ===
In 2023, the US Census Bureau estimated that the median household income was $111,983, and the per capita income was $72,132. About 0.0% of families and 9.0% of the population were below the poverty line.

=== 2010 census ===
The 2010 United States census reported that Eldridge had a population of 1,233. The population density was 1,891.1 inhabitants per square mile (730.2/km^{2}). The racial makeup of Eldridge was 988 (80.1%) White, 10 (0.8%) African American, 3 (0.2%) Native American, 36 (2.9%) Asian, 6 (0.5%) Pacific Islander, 144 (11.7%) from other races, and 46 (3.7%) from two or more races. Hispanic or Latino of any race were 325 persons (26.4%).

The Census reported that 99.8% of the population lived in households and 0.2% lived in non-institutionalized group quarters.

There were 500 households, out of which 155 (31.0%) had children under the age of 18 living in them, 242 (48.4%) were opposite-sex married couples living together, 46 (9.2%) had a female householder with no husband present, 28 (5.6%) had a male householder with no wife present. There were 35 (7.0%) unmarried opposite-sex partnerships, and 5 (1.0%) same-sex married couples or partnerships. 137 households (27.4%) were made up of individuals, and 33 (6.6%) had someone living alone who was 65 years of age or older. The average household size was 2.46. There were 316 families (63.2% of all households); the average family size was 3.02.

The population was spread out, with 274 people (22.2%) under the age of 18, 109 people (8.8%) aged 18 to 24, 320 people (26.0%) aged 25 to 44, 394 people (32.0%) aged 45 to 64, and 136 people (11.0%) who were 65 years of age or older. The median age was 39.8 years. For every 100 females, there were 100.8 males. For every 100 females age 18 and over, there were 99.0 males.

There were 563 housing units at an average density of 863.5 per square mile (333.4/km^{2}), of which 53.4% were owner-occupied and 46.6% were occupied by renters. The homeowner vacancy rate was 2.2%; the rental vacancy rate was 12.4%. 54.5% of the population lived in owner-occupied housing units and 45.3% lived in rental housing units.

== Government ==
In the California State Legislature, Eldridge is in the 3rd senatorial district, represented by Democrat Christopher Cabaldon, and in the 4th Assembly district, represented by Democrat Cecilia Aguiar-Curry.

In the United States House of Representatives, Eldridge is in California's 4th congressional district, represented by Democrat Mike Thompson.

== Education ==
The school district is Sonoma Valley Unified School District.

== See also ==
- Arnold Drive Bridge
