= Rancho Agua Caliente (Sonoma County) =

Historic rancho in Sonoma County, California

Coordinates: 38.35°N 122.51°W

Rancho Agua Caliente was a 3,219-acre (13.03 km^{2}) Mexican land grant in present day Sonoma County, California given in 1840 by Governor Juan Alvarado to Lázaro Piña (often misspelled as "Pena" in historical documents). The name means "warm water" and refers to the hot springs in the area. The grant extended two and one half leagues to the north of Sonoma and was one quarter league wide, and included present day Glen Ellen, Fetters Hot Springs, and Agua Caliente.

== History ==
Lázaro Piña (d. 1847), a soldier who had come to California in 1819. In 1829, Lazaro joined the military revolt of Joaquín Solis. against Governor Echeandía. In 1838, Piña came under the command of General Mariano Vallejo in Sonoma. By 1840, Vallejo's staff consisted of Colonel Victor Prudon, Major José de los Santos Berreyesa, and Alfarez (second lieutenant) Lázaro Piña. Lázaro Piña and his wife, Maria Placida Villela (d.1844) were the parents of six sons (Jesus(b. 1826), José German Pina (1829–1847), Francisco(b. 1831), Antonio(1831–1853), Luis(b. 1834)) and one daughter, Clara (b. 1836). José German Pina was the grantee of Rancho Tzabaco. When Villela died in 1844, Lázaro married, Maria Ignacia Pacheco. Lázaro left California soon after the beginning of the Mexican-American War and was killed fighting on the Mexican side at the Battle of Cerro Gordo in 1847.

With the cession of California to the United States following the Mexican-American War, the 1848 Treaty of Guadalupe Hidalgo provided that the land grants would be honored. As required by the Land Act of 1851, a claim for Rancho Agua Caliente was filed by Mariano G. Vallejo with the Public Land Commission in 1853, but the Commission rejected the claim for lack of any proof, either of the original grant or of the alleged conveyance from Piña to Vallejo. On appeal in 1861, the US Supreme Court confirmed the grant to Vallejo and the grant was patented at 1,864 acres (7.5 km^{2}) in 1880.

A claim was filed by C.P. Stone with the Land Commission in 1853 and was patented at 212 acres (0.9 km^{2}) in 1880.

On December 4, 1851, U.S. Army Captain Joseph Hooker bought 550-acres of Rancho Agua Caliente. He moved there in January 1852 to farm, but was unsuccessful. In December 1852, one year after his court martial in Sonoma for profiteering, Hooker resigned from the United States Army, effective in February 1853. Hooker filed a claim with the Land Commission in 1853 and was patented at 551 acres (2.2 km^{2}) in 1866.

Vallejo sold part of the rancho to Thaddeus M. Leavenworth, a Connecticut Episcopalian who was also a physician and druggist. Leavenworth arrived in San Francisco as chaplain of the 1st Regiment of New York Volunteers in March 1847. He was alcalde of San Francisco in 1848-49, but had difficulties with the military government and was removed from office. A claim was filed by Thaddeus M. Leavenworth with the Land Commission in 1853 and was patented at 592 acres (2.4 km^{2}) in 1880.

In 1858, Colonel Charles V. Stuart, purchased part of the rancho and named his ranch Glen Ellen in honor of his wife, Ellen.

== Historic sites of the Rancho ==
- Lachryma Montis. M. G. Vallejo moved from his Casa Grande to this estate on the edge of Sonoma in the early 1850s. He named it "Lachryma Montis" (weeping mountain) after a spring on the property.
