= Geyserville, California =

Geyserville
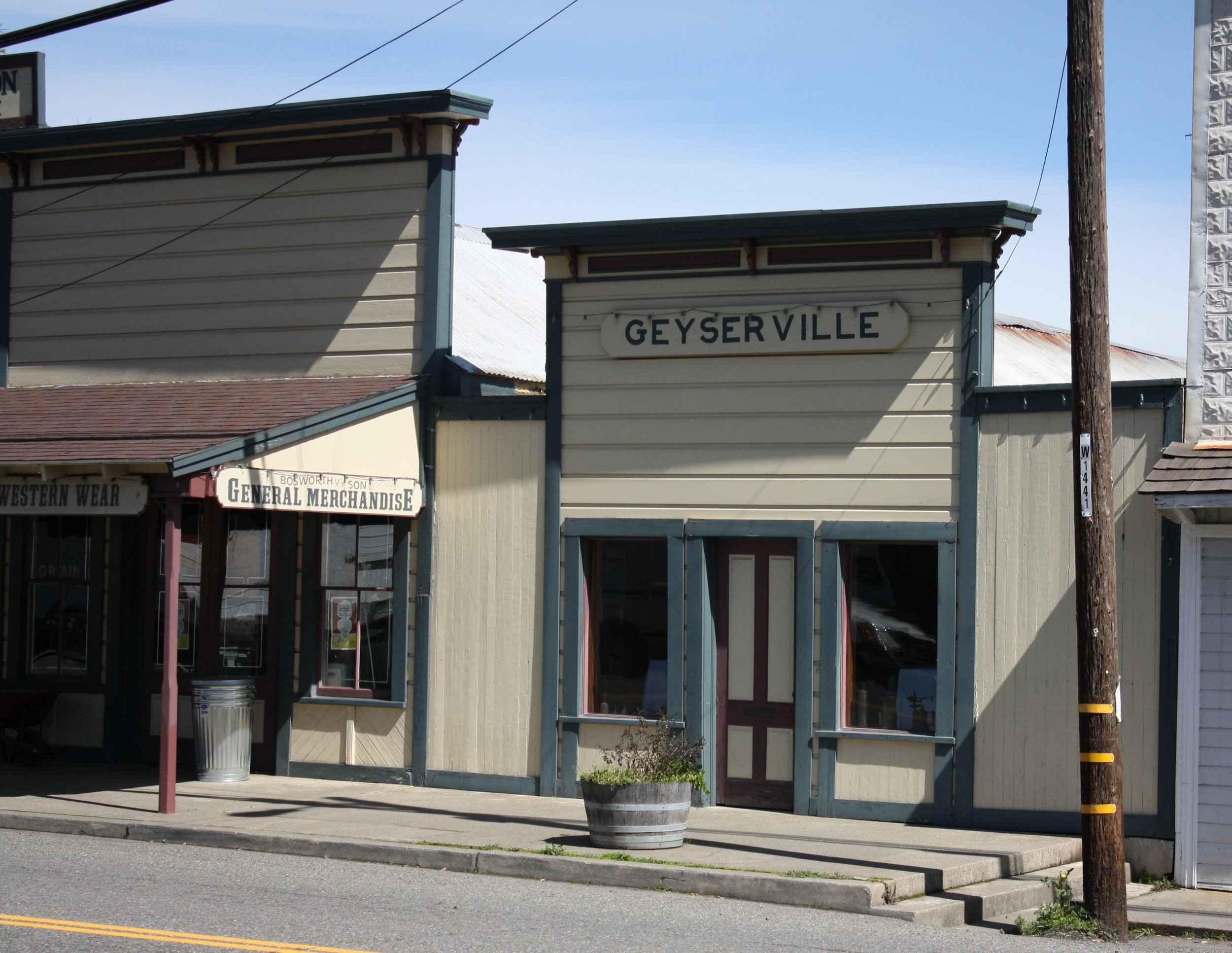
- Geyserville, California

- Location within the state of California
- Coordinates: 38°42′28″N 122°54′9″W
- Country: United States
- State: California
- County: Sonoma

Area
  - Total: 4.514 sq mi (11.690 km^{2})
  - Land: 4.514 sq mi (11.690 km^{2})
  - Water: 0 sq mi (0 km^{2}) 0%
- Elevation: 213 ft (65 m)

Population (2020)
  - Total: 861
  - Density: 191/sq mi (73.7/km^{2})
- Time zone: UTC-8 (PST)
  - Summer (DST): UTC-7 (PDT)
- ZIP code: 95441
- Area code: 707
- FIPS code: 06-29420
- GNIS feature ID: 224138

Geyserville (/ˈɡaɪzərvɪl/; formerly Clairville) is an unincorporated community and census-designated place (CDP) in Sonoma County, California, United States. Located in the Wine Country, Geyserville has a small selection of restaurants, bed and breakfasts, and wineries. Geyserville is located on California State Route 128, close to US Route 101. The population was 861 at the 2020 census.

== History ==
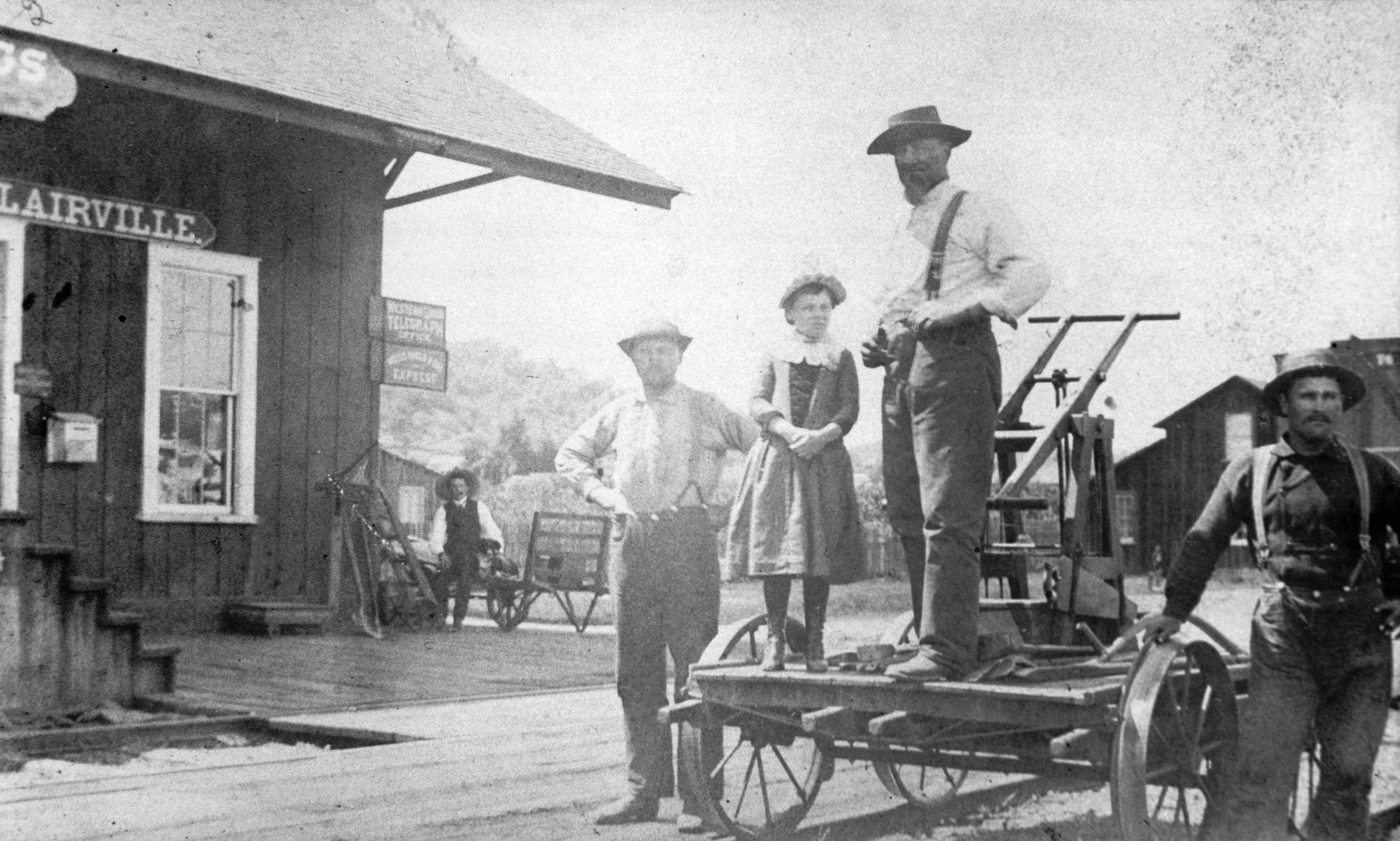
Depot in Clairville (now Geyserville), 1885

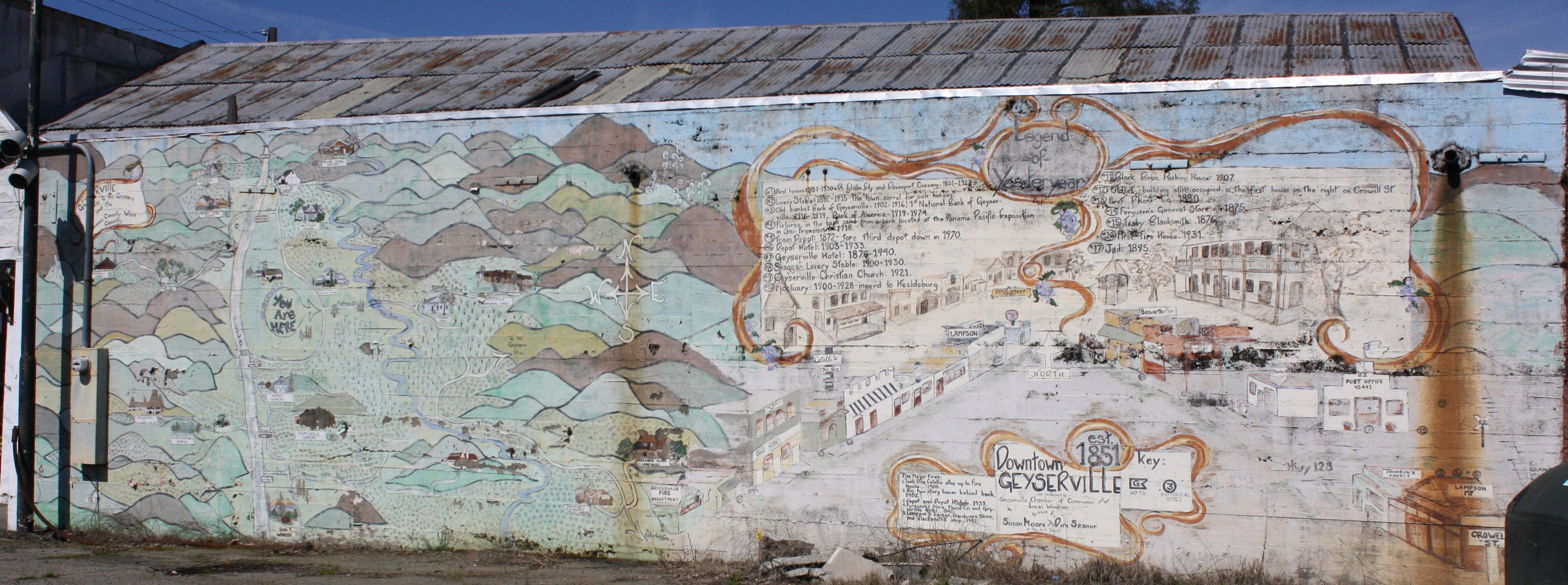
Mural of Geyserville

Geyserville, located on the Rancho Tzabaco Mexican land grant, owes its foundation to the discovery in 1847 of a series of hot springs, fumaroles, and steam vents in a gorge in the mountains of Sonoma County, California, between Calistoga and Cloverdale. This complex, which became known as The Geysers, soon became a tourist attraction, and a settlement grew up to provide accommodation and serve as a gateway to The Geysers. It was initially known as Clairville but subsequently renamed Geyserville. After the San Francisco and North Pacific Railroad was extended to Cloverdale in the 1870s, its trains stopped in Geyserville.

== Geography ==
According to the United States Census Bureau, the CDP covers an area of 4.5 square miles (11.7 km^{2}), all land.

== Demographics ==
Historical population
Census	Pop.	Note	%±
2010	862		—
2020	861		−0.1%
2024 (est.)	1,003	▲	16.5%
U.S. Decennial Census; 1860–1870 1880-1890; 1900 1910 1920; 1930 1940 1950; 1960 1970 1980; 1990 2000 2010; 2020

Geyserville first appeared as a census designated place in the 2010 U.S. census.

=== Racial and ethnic composition ===
Geyserville CDP, California – Racial and ethnic composition Note: the US Census treats Hispanic/Latino as an ethnic category. This table excludes Latinos from the racial categories and assigns them to a separate category. Hispanics/Latinos may be of any race.
Race / Ethnicity (NH = Non-Hispanic)	Pop 2010	Pop 2020	% 2010	% 2020
White alone (NH)	491	444	56.96%	51.57%
Black or African American alone (NH)	5	4	0.58%	0.46%
Native American or Alaska Native alone (NH)	3	4	0.35%	0.46%
Asian alone (NH)	14	18	1.62%	2.09%
Native Hawaiian or Pacific Islander alone (NH)	0	2	0.00%	0.23%
Other race alone (NH)	0	6	0.00%	0.70%
Mixed race or Multiracial (NH)	21	41	2.44%	4.76%
Hispanic or Latino (any race)	328	342	38.05%	39.72%
Total	862	861	100.00%	100.00%

=== 2020 census ===
The 2020 United States census reported that Geyserville had a population of 861. The population density was 190.7 inhabitants per square mile (73.6/km^{2}). The racial makeup of Geyserville was 471 (54.7%) White, 4 (0.5%) African American, 26 (3.0%) Native American, 18 (2.1%) Asian, 2 (0.2%) Pacific Islander, 191 (22.2%) from other races, and 149 (17.3%) from two or more races. Hispanic or Latino of any race were 342 persons (39.7%).

The whole population lived in households. There were 302 households, out of which 68 (22.5%) had children under the age of 18 living in them, 156 (51.7%) were married-couple households, 15 (5.0%) were cohabiting couple households, 63 (20.9%) had a female householder with no partner present, and 68 (22.5%) had a male householder with no partner present. 81 households (26.8%) were one person, and 48 (15.9%) were one person aged 65 or older. The average household size was 2.85. There were 195 families (64.6% of all households).

The age distribution was 164 people (19.0%) under the age of 18, 55 people (6.4%) aged 18 to 24, 197 people (22.9%) aged 25 to 44, 248 people (28.8%) aged 45 to 64, and 197 people (22.9%) who were 65 years of age or older. The median age was 45.9 years. For every 100 females, there were 109.5 males.

There were 339 housing units at an average density of 75.1 units per square mile (29.0 units/km^{2}), of which 302 (89.1%) were occupied. Of these, 219 (72.5%) were owner-occupied, and 83 (27.5%) were occupied by renters.

== Transportation ==
Geyserville Avenue carries the designation of California State Route 128 until it routes along U.S. Route 101 to the north. The Northwestern Pacific right-of-way is expected to be reactivated for Sonoma–Marin Area Rail Transit service when the line is rebuilt to Cloverdale, and Geyserville is under consideration to receive a stop.

== Education ==
The school district is Geyserville Unified School District. The school district includes Geyserville New Tech Academy, or GNTA, focusing on Project Based Learning for high school and middle school students, and Geyserville Elementary for grade school students.

== See also ==
- Northwestern Pacific Railroad
- Wine Country
