= Markarian 1034 =

Interacting galaxies in the constellation of Triangulum

Mrk 1034
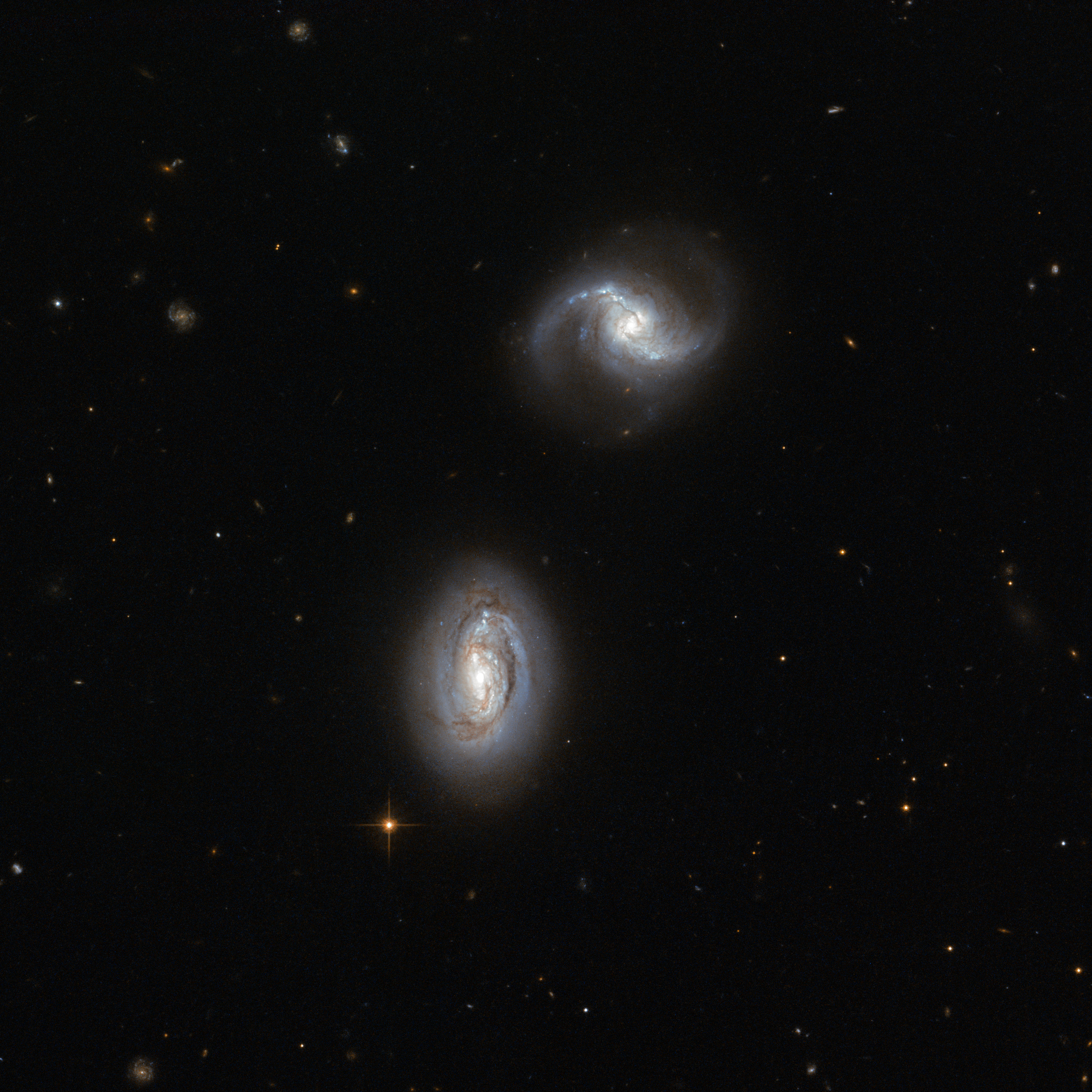
- HST image of Mrk 1034

Observation data (J2000 epoch)
- Constellation: Triangulum
- Right ascension: 02^{h} 23^{m} 20.4^{s}
- Declination: 32° 11′ 34″
- Redshift: 0.033830
- Heliocentric radial velocity: 10,142 ± 10 km/s
- Distance: 465 Mly (142.5 Mpc)
- Apparent magnitude (V): 0.21
- Apparent magnitude (B): 0.28

Characteristics
- Type: LIRG, Sa + Sb
- Apparent size (V): '0.6 x 0.4' & '0.4 x 0.4'
- Notable features: luminous infrared galaxies

Other designations
- PGC 9074/9071, KPG 067, V Zw 233, Mrk 1034

Markarian 1034 (Mrk 1034) is a pair of spiral galaxies comprising PGC 9074 and PGC 9071, located in the constellation Triangulum. They are located at a distance of 465 million light-years from Earth and are classified as luminous infrared galaxies.

== PGC 9074 ==
PGC 9074 known as Mrk 1034a, is classified as a type Sa galaxy. It has two spiral arms around its nucleus with a bright galactic bulge. These spiral arms are shown to have dust obscuring background light of stars behind its regions. These are mixed together with star clusters containing a stellar population of hot, recently formed stars. In the central region of PGC 9074, older stars are found surrounded by a faint halo of another group of old stars, some inside globular clusters.

The nucleus of PGC 9074 is active and it has been classified as a Seyfert 1 galaxy. It is categorized as a Markarian galaxy because when, compared to other galaxies, its nucleus emits large amounts of ultraviolet rays. It is on the verge of gravitationally interacting with its neighbor, PGC 9071 since the two of them are at close proximity.

== PGC 9071 ==
PGC 9071 known as Mrk 1034b, is classified as a type Sb galaxy. It has almost the same appearance and size to PGC 9074, but with a fainter bulge and a slight altered spiral arm structure: its coils are further away. In addition, it contains a young stellar popular of hot stars combined with obscured dust, with a central region of older star populations.

The nucleus of PGC 9071 is active and it is also a Seyfert 1 galaxy. It has a high surface brightness and contains a one-sided jet measured to be 0.144 arcsecs or 103 pc, with a 'kidney-bean' shaped structure located within its optical core. The galaxy is also interacting with PGC 9074, in which eventually they will merge together to form a larger entity in hundreds of millions of years.
