= Sonoma Developmental Center =

- Sonoma Developmental Center--Main Building
- U.S. National Register of Historic Places
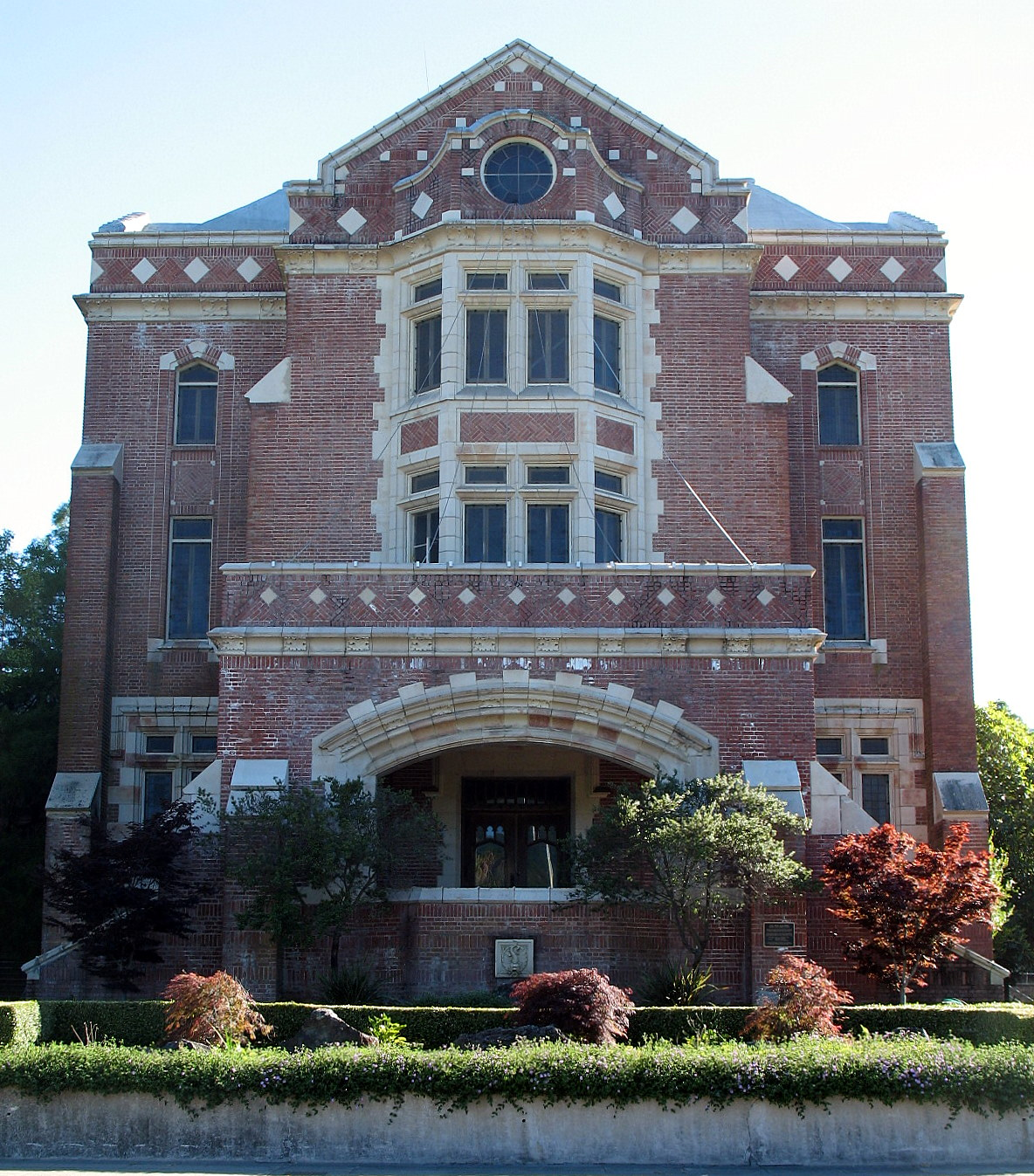

- Location within California Location within the United States
- Location: 15000 Arnold Drive; Eldridge, California
- Coordinates: 38°20′50″N 122°31′7″W
- Area: 1,670 acres (7 km^{2})
- NRHP reference No.: 00001180
- Added to NRHP: October 6, 2000

The Sonoma Developmental Center (SDC) was a large state school in California, United States for people with developmental disabilities, and is located in Eldridge in Sonoma County. Former names for this hospital include California Home for the Care and Training of Feeble Minded Children (1883); Sonoma State Home (1909); Sonoma State Hospital (1953); and Sonoma Developmental Center starting in 1986. The center closed on 31 December 2018.

== History ==
=== Founding ===
It opened at its current location on November 24, 1891, though it had existed at previous locations in White Sulphur Springs near Vallejo, California starting in 1883; a location in Fasking Park in Alameda County; and another location in Santa Clara (near the intersection of Market and Washington Street) from 1885 to 1891.

In 1902, Governor Henry T. Gage ordered an investigation by Frederick Winslow Hatch, the General Superintendent of State Hospitals in California for Dr. William M. Lawlor, the Superintendent of the California Home for the Care and Training of Feeble Minded Children. Lawlor was charged with the cruel treatment of patients under his care, including children.

Dozens died at this hospital in an outbreak of Spanish influenza in 1918.

=== Involuntary sterilization ===
California was the third state to pass a compulsory sterilization law in 1909, the Asexualization Act. F.O. Butler was the superintendent of Sonoma State home starting in 1918. He believed that sterilization benefited both the individuals and society as a whole, Both through public promotion and actual operations, he was largely responsible for thousands of sterilizations. He himself is estimated to have performed at least 1000 sterilizations throughout his career. During his time as superintendent, Sonoma acted as a kind of "revolving operating room." In an attempt to expand beyond the institution (and get around a legal loophole), Sonoma admitted patients solely for the purpose of being sterilized and then released. According to a study conducted by Paul Popenoe, between the years 1922–1925, 25% of those females sterilized fell into this category. This aggressive approach is likely the reason for Sonoma's comparatively high number of sterilizations. Sonoma was said to have sterilized more "mental defectives" than any other institution in the world.

=== Human experimentation ===
Often overlooked, Sonoma conducted dangerous tests and trials on patients into the 1960s. Testing in mental institution alleviated the compensation and consent required for researches. Such treatments, including radiation dosing experiments, resulted in countless injuries and deaths that are still being investigated.

A story in the October, 1952 issue of the Sonoma Index-Tribune, described the test of a live polio vaccine on "61 boys and girls (who) took the new vaccine in a glass of chocolate milk … regarding it merely as an extra 'treat'." The Index-Tribune article clarifies that parents of the young subjects had given their permission for the tests.

=== Abuse in the 1990s through 2010s ===
In the 1990s, after a teenage boy was found injured and lying in a pool of blood in a shower, a class-action lawsuit resulted in a settlement that stepped up the exodus of residents from developmental centers.

==== 2000 citations ====
In 2000, state health inspectors accused Sonoma of numerous violations that resulted in deaths. The state Department of Health Services has issued at least 15 citations, carrying penalties totaling $142,800.This includes an incident where a female staff member sexually fondled a male patient, and two instances in which staffers hit residents.

Because of the state citations, as well as extensive inspection reports, the federal Health Care Financing Agency refused to recertify the center and moved to cut the flow of $3 million in monthly Medicaid dollars. These violations came less than three years after federal inspectors documented deaths and unsanitary conditions in California's homes in 1997.

One man died of an overdose of anti-depressants in 1999. The coroners could not tell whether the death was a homicide, suicide or accident. The hospital was cited for failure to prevent harm. Another incident was the 1999 death of a woman from toxic levels of opiates.

In March 2001, five employees were suspended during an investigation into abuse. One of these abuses were "beat down parties" where employees would choose a resident and assault them. Other cases included staff members humiliating and slapping residents.

In August 2001, a new bill required development centers to immediately report all resident "deaths and serious injuries of unknown origin" to their local law enforcement agency. This is after a 1999 investigation by the Index-Tribune found that:

"the facility had hired inadequately trained, under-qualified, unsupervised investigators; that site administrators were called into incident scenes before investigators arrived; and that a conflict of interest existed because investigators were employed by the same facility they were supposed to investigate. Some employees within the facility indicated that many incidents were never reported, in part because staff members were afraid of retaliation."

In April 2002, Nicholas Turley, a 14 year old, collapsed at Sonoma Developmental Center. He died at the hospital 37 hours later. Chief deputy coroner Will Wallman said toxicology results indicated that Turley died from an overdose of phenobarbital, a barbiturate that is commonly used as a sedative and to control seizures. The lab report showed that Turley's system had 75 milligrams of phenobarbital per liter of blood—nearly twice as much as what is considered safe. The investigation was closed with no answers.

"It's hard to get that level in a person's system. Phenobarbital is . . . slow to uptake and slow to release. Administered twice a day (as in Turley's case), it should balance out to about 35 milligrams per liter... Natural, homicide, accident, suicide - we don't have enough to pin it on any of those four, so it's 'could not be determined."

==== 2012 Taser assaults ====
In September 2012, the director of Sonoma received an anonymous voicemail saying that a staff member was attacking patients with a stun gun. Archie Millora, who had worked as a psychiatric technical assistant for 14 years, was apprehended the next day with a Taser and a loaded gun in his car. He was placed on administrative leave but not arrested.

A subsequent independent probe by the California Department of Public Health reveals that nurses examined and photographed patients in his care. They found suspicious abrasions on "the buttocks, thigh, arm and back" of 12 people. A forensic pathologist concluded that the marks were "strongly suggestive of electrical thermal burns," consistent with a Taser. All of the reported victims have extreme difficulty communicating, but when questioned, one of them uttered the words "stun" and Millora's name which the incident report identified as "Staff A."

He was eventually fired. Court records show in April, Millora pleaded no contest to misdemeanor possession of a loaded firearm. He got probation and a $190 fine in lieu of jail time. But Millora was never charged with the reported stun gun assaults—charges that if convicted, could have given him serious prison time.

==== 2012 sexual assault investigation ====
A Center for Investigative Reporting investigation in 2012 showed that at least 12 sexual assault reports at Sonoma were not investigated and hospital-supervised rape exams were not conducted in some cases. In one case, the report states, male caregivers were assigned to a patient even after a complaint of abuse by staff while the patient was bathing. In another, a Sonoma caregiver was cleared of assault and went on to molest a second patient. In another, state investigators didn't act on a patient's complaint against a staff member. Her pregnancy was overlooked for several months and she eventually gave birth to a child.

In 2012, the California Department for Public Health announced they were moving to revoke the license of the Sonoma Developmental Center's Intermediate Care Facility that services 290 residents with intellectual disabilities, and decertifying it from participation in the federal Medicaid program.

Terri Delgadillo, director of the state Department of Developmental Services, said, "We have removed the Executive Director and the Clinical Director (of the Sonoma Developmental Center) and taken disciplinary action against several employees, including job terminations."

==== 2013 protests ====
In the wake of a California state report that confirmed all that was found in previous CIR reports in 2011, advocates for developmentally disabled people gathered in 2013 at the state Capitol to demand that Gov. Jerry Brown take action on the abuse in these facilities.

Kimberly Williams, who once lived at Sonoma, said,

"It was the worst time of my life. Shut these hellholes down now."

==== 2015 CIR investigation ====
A 2015 investigation by the Center for Investigative Reporting showed that the five developmental centers in California, also known as state schools, were directly responsible for 13 deaths since 2002, and held responsibility for many more. In October 2005, a staff member found a 25-year-old resident vomiting blood in his bed at the Sonoma Developmental Center. In his vomit, staff found a plastic-handled cotton swab used for dry mouth. They immediately transferred him to an outside hospital. The hospital found other swabs in his mouth, which had punctured his esophagus and aorta.

Both the autopsy and the public health department's investigation suggested that a caregiver left the swabs in his mouth. The autopsy read,

"The decedent's conditions of quadriplegia with body and limb deformity related to cerebral palsy render him, in my opinion, very unlikely to have introduced the swabs himself."

The center was fined $90,000. The 12 other citations for facilities found to have caused resident deaths ranged from $22,500 to $80,000.

The Sonoma Developmental Center received eight citations linked to deaths of residents, with fines ranging from $1,000 (a resident with hypothermia didn't get immediate treatment) to $90,000 (the resident who swallowed the cotton swabs).

==== 2015 sex abuse case ====
In 2015, Rex Bradford Salyer, 63, a former Sonoma Developmental Center psychiatric technician, pleaded no contest to sexually abusing a disabled female resident over a yearlong period. The abuse started sometime in between his hiring in May 2013 and continued until his arrest on July 4 of 2014. He was found guilty of having sexual intercourse with someone incapable of giving legal consent, two counts of oral copulation and abusing a dependent adult. He was the victim's direct caregiver. Sayler was sentenced to 7 years in prison.

In 2000, the main building was listed in the National Register of Historic Places.

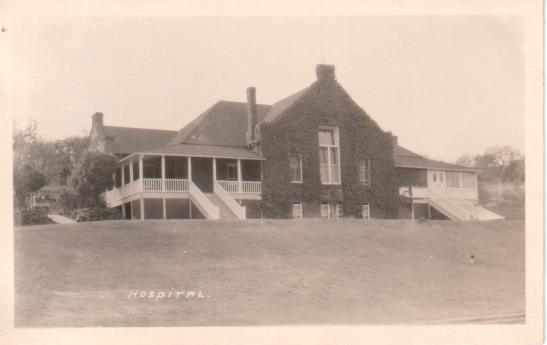
The hospital at Sonoma Developmental Center is where the majority of forced sterilizations took place in California

== Closure and reuse plan ==
In 2015, the state announced the closure of SDC by the end of 2018. This meant the relocation of more than 300 residents, and the development of a reuse plan for the property.

The October 2017, the Nuns Fire had a dramatic impact on SDC, necessitating a mandatory evacuation of hundreds of residents and staff, and burning the eastern third of the property along California State Route 12. The main area of SDC withstood the fires, and the remaining residents all moved back in; however, the fire forced a major interruption of the State's site assessment process.

In May 2017, the State hired Wallace Roberts & Todd (WRT) to provide architectural and engineering services to prepare "a comprehensive existing conditions study and an opportunities and constraints summary and analysis for SDC."

The State incorporated a strong community engagement plan as part of the WRT contract. In order to ensure that the site assessment was based on the best available data—and that the analysis is designed to answer the most pressing concerns of the local community—WRT created an SDC Community Advisory Committee (CAC). This committee is composed of a broad range of local stakeholders, and its purpose is "to provide comments to the WRT team on the Site Assessment findings and to offer input regarding the opportunities and constraints for the SDC site."

The first meeting of the CAC was September 28, 2017. Ten days later, the fires raged through the North Bay, and WRT's goal of producing its reports and holding a series of community meetings by the end of 2017 was lost in the tumult of wildlife disaster response. After a three-month delay, CAC scheduled a meeting with WRT on March 22, 2018. After the cancelled September CAC meeting, WRT had planned to finish the site assessment, presenting the findings one more time to the CAC, and then hold a public meeting in Sonoma where the whole community would be briefed on this critical information.

The center officially closed on 31 December 2018.

In December 2022, a memorial was dedicated to those who have lived and died at Sonoma. There are over 1,500 people buried in a field on site from 1892 to 1939. There are no headstones or grave markers.

== Research resources ==
The State Archive in Sacramento has extensive holdings on the early history of the Home, including patient registers, photographs, maps, and records. The Gosney Archive at Caltech in Pasadena, CA contains information about sterilization from the 1920s. The SDC does have some historical resources, but these are not open to the general public.

== Fictional works ==
- The Center provided the setting for Jack London's short story Told in the Drooling Ward (1914).
- Downloadable version of Jack London's short story Told in the Drooling Ward (1914) with an introduction by Ed Davis
- The book In All Things: A Return to the Drooling Ward is a fictionalized account based on the author's experiences while training as a psychiatric technician at the former hospital.

== See also ==
- Eugenics
- Lake Suttonfield
- National Register of Historic Places listings in Sonoma County, California
- Sonoma County Historic Landmarks and Districts
- Unethical human experimentation in the United States
