= List of historic landmarks in Petaluma =

This is a List of Petaluma Historic Landmarks and Districts. Petaluma Historic Landmarks are historic resources in Petaluma, California that the Petaluma City Council has determined to be significant based on local, state, and federal criteria. The city's Historic and Cultural Resource Committee and its Planning Commission review all proposed landmarks. Designated landmarks and properties in historic districts cannot be demolished or renovated without review and permitting approval by these bodies. The city automatically includes nationally recognized sites, such as places listed on the National Register of Historic Places, as Petaluma landmarks.

== Petaluma Historic Districts ==
The Petaluma Historic Commercial District was listed on the National Register of Historic Places in 1995, and the city established design guidelines for the district in 1999. In addition the city has designated at least two more historic districts:

- A Street Historic District, established in 1986, and the
- Oakhill-Brewster Historic District, established in 1990.

"Warehouse District" may or may not also be designated.

== Petaluma Historic Landmarks ==
Petaluma Number	Landmark Name	Location	Image	Notes	California Historical Landmark Number	National Recognition
1	Residence	119 Howard Street; 38.233174°N 122.64485°W	Ord. No. 1490 N.C.S.			
2	Farrell House/River Café Building	222 Weller Street; 38.235505°N 122.63698°W	Ord. No. 1673 N.C.S.			
3	Green Mill Sign	Hwy 101 near Holm Road; 38.269480°N 122.66598°W	Ord. No. 1358 N.C.S.			
4	Coca-Cola Sign	Western Ave. & Kentucky St. 38.233766°N 122.64121°W	Ord. No. 1249 N.C.S.			
5	Andresen Building	19 Western Ave. 38.233743°N 122.64081°W	Ord. No. 1314 N.C.S.			
6	WCTU Drinking Fountain	Western Ave. & Petaluma Ave. N 38.233947°N 122.64041°W	Ord. No. 1375 N.C.S.			
7	Great Petaluma Mill	6-8 Petaluma Blvd. 38.233915°N 122.63918°W	Ord. No. 1297 N.C.S.			
8	Old Post Office Building	10-22 Petaluma Blvd. 38.233703°N 122.63971°W	Ord. No. 1298 N.C.S.			
9	McNear Building	15-25 Petaluma Blvd. 38.233608°N 122.64035°W	Ord. No. 1299 N.C.S.			
10	Koby Residence + Carriage House	901 D St. 38.225565°N 122.64073°W	Ord. No. 1814 N.C.S.			
11	Hansen House	719 North McDowell Blvd; 38.260031°N 122.64463°W	Ord. No. 2471 N.C.S.			
12	Residence	200 West Street; 38.241283°N 122.64673°W	Ord. No. 2515 N.C.S.			
13	Quinn Residence	503 2nd Street; 38.231687°N 122.63222°W	Ord. No. 2273 N.C.S.			
14	Burdell Building	405 East D Street; 38.237389°N 122.63441°W	Ord. No. 2381 N.C.S.			
15	Lee Residence	206 E Street; 38.232447°N 122.63566°W	Ord. No. 2242 N.C.S.			
16	Petaluma Silk Mill	450 Jefferson Street; 38.236107°N 122.63090°W	Designed by noted architect Brainerd Jones.			National Register 86000386
17	Philip Sweed House	301 Keokuk Street; 38.236242°N 122.64623°W				
18	Petaluma Historic Commercial District	Petaluma Blvd.: B St. to Prospect St., approx. 23 acres 38.235238°N 122.64096°W	Ord. No. 2097 N.C.S.			National Register 95000354
19	Ellis-Martin House	1197 East Washington Street; 38.245140°N 122.63015°W				National Register 06000915
20	Old Petaluma Opera House/The Maclay Building	147-149 Kentucky Street; 38.234909°N 122.64199°W			National Register 78000801	
21	Free Public Library of Petaluma	20 4th Street; 38.232558°N 122.64002°W				National Register 88000925
22	U.S. Post Office	120 4th Street; 38.231767°N 122.63773°W				National Register 85000140
District	Oakhill-Brewster Historic District	Generally north and west of downtown area. 38.236591°N 122.647429°W	Ord. No. 1796 N.C.S.			
District	A Street Historic District	Generally south and east of downtown area. 38.231705°N 122.641483°W	Ord. No. 1666 N.C.S.			

== See also ==
- List of National Historic Landmarks in California
- California Historical Landmarks in Sonoma County, California
