= Mystic Theatre =

Mystic Theatre may refer to:

- Mystic Theatre (album), by Mark Olson, Victoria Williams and the Original Harmony Ridge Creekdippers
- Mystic Theatre (Petaluma, California), historic building and live music venue
- Mystic Theatre (Marmarth, North Dakota), listed on the NRHP

== See also ==
- Mystery Theater (disambiguation)
