= Ellis-Martin House =

- Ellis--Martin House
- U.S. National Register of Historic Places
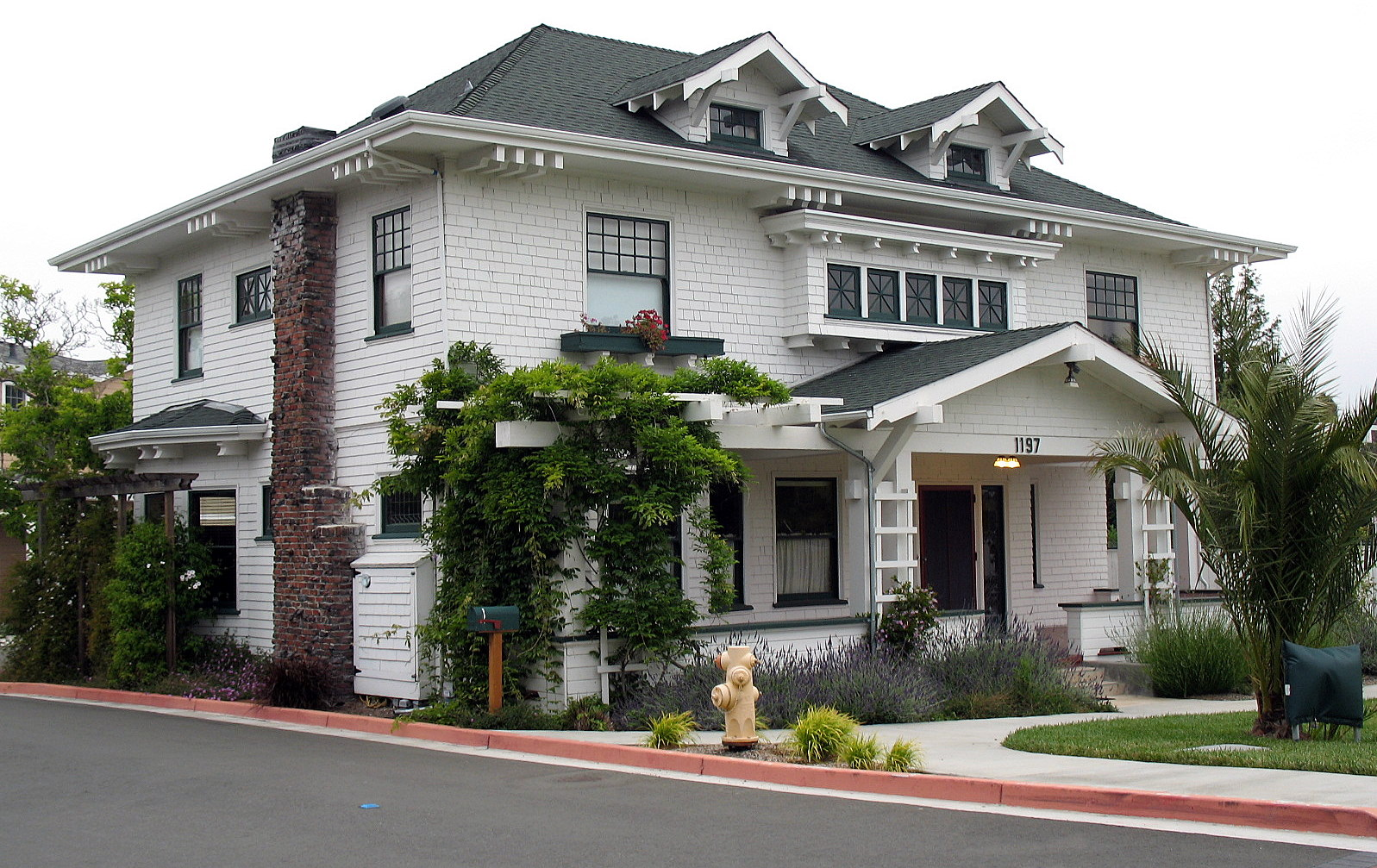

- Location within California
- Location: 1197 E. Washington St., Petaluma, California
- Coordinates: 38°14′43″N 122°37′48″W
- Area: less than one acre
- Built: 1908
- Built by: Frank A. Sullivan
- Architect: Brainerd Jones
- Architectural style: Bungalow/craftsman
- NRHP reference No.: 06000915
- Added to NRHP: October 4, 2006

The Ellis--Martin House, at 1197 E. Washington St. in Petaluma, California, is a Craftsman style house which was built in 1908. It was listed on the National Register of Historic Places in 2006.

It was designed by Petaluma architect Brainerd Jones and was built for John D. Ellis, a farmer, by Santa Rosa-based builder Frank A. Sullivan. It was home of Leopold Martin and his descendants, of a Marin County ranching family, from 1920 to 1998.
