= Brainerd Jones =

American architect

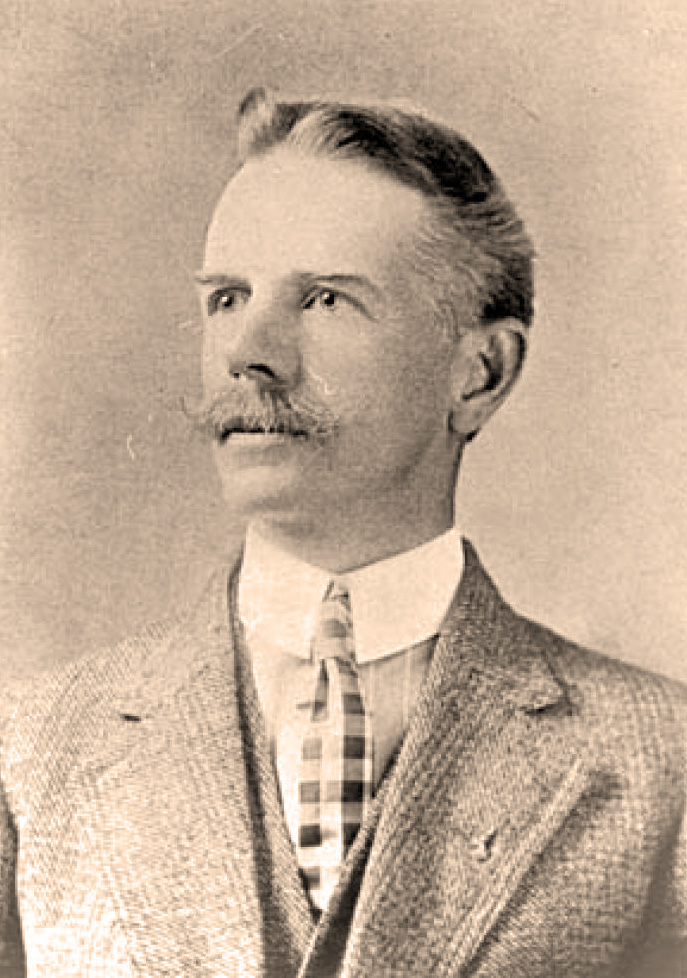
- Brainerd Jones, ca1910
- Born: 1865
- Died: 1949 (aged 83–84)
- Occupation: Architect
- Known for: Designing three Carnegie libraries in Sonoma County

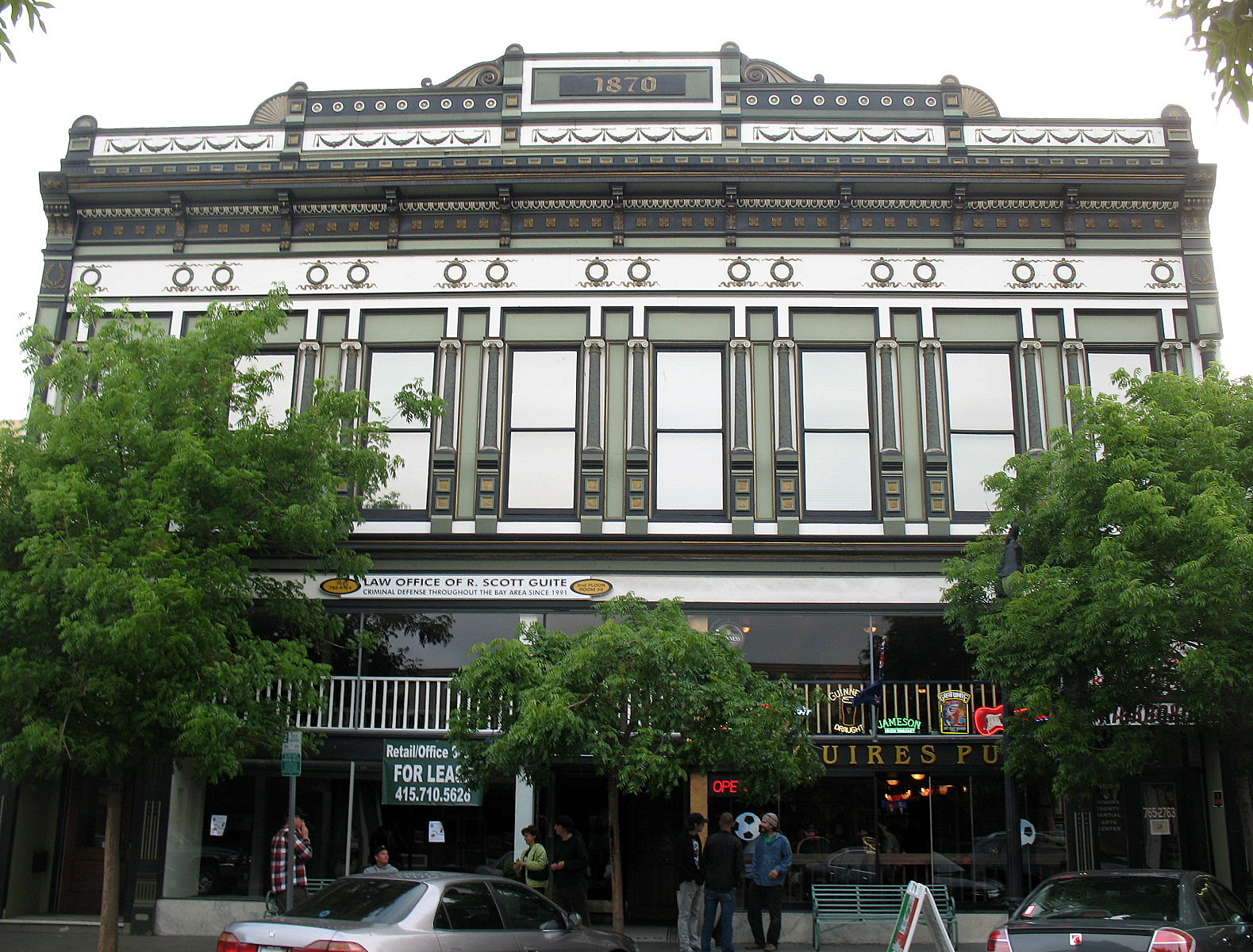
Old Petaluma Opera House

Brainerd Jones (1865 – 1949) was an American architect who designed and built most of the architecturally significant buildings in Petaluma, California.

== Career ==
Jones is best known for designing three Carnegie libraries in Sonoma County, two of which still remain standing and listed on the National Register of Historic Places. Jones also has seven other buildings which he contributed to and nine of which are on the National Register.

The overall importance and character of the Petaluma downtown can be partially attributed to Brainerd Jones' contribution. In Santa Rosa, Jones also designed many significant buildings including the Exchange Bank (now destroyed), the Saturday Afternoon Club, the Petaluma Women's Club building, the Lumsden House, and the Oates-Comstock House.

The D Street area has a wealth of important old houses, many of which are attributed to Brainerd Jones, including the Byce House, used for the filming of Peggy Sue Got Married; the Reynaud House, as well as four other brick homes. Jones is known for his use of native stone in his buildings. Other examples include: the 1917 Petaluma and Santa Rosa Electric Railway Depot (now the West County Museum) in Sebastopol, the 1922 addition to the C.C. Silk Mill in Petaluma, the 1911 remodel of the McNear Building in Petaluma and part of the McClay Building, the 1920 Petaluma Post Office (now a retail store), the Simon Pinschower House in Cloverdale, and the 1922 Petaluma Golf and Country Club Clubhouse.

== Works ==
A number of his works are listed on the U.S. National Register of Historic Places.

Works include (attribution):

- Ellis-Martin House, 1197 E. Washington St. Petaluma, CA (Jones, Brainerd), NRHP-listed
- Free Public Library of Petaluma, 20 Fourth St. Petaluma, CA (Jones, Brainerd), NRHP-listed
- Healdsburg Carnegie Library, 221 Matheson St. Healdsburg, CA (Jones, Brainerd), NRHP-listed
- W. H. Lumsden House, 727 Mendocino St. Santa Rosa, CA (Jones, Brainerd), NRHP-listed
- Erskine McNear B., 121 Knight Dr. San Rafael, CA (Jones, Brainerd), NRHP-listed
- Old Petaluma Opera House, 147–149 Kentucky St. Petaluma, CA (Jones, Brainerd), NRHP-listed
- Petaluma Silk Mill, 420 Jefferson St. Petaluma, CA (Jones, Brainerd), NRHP-listed
- Sebastopol Depot of the Petaluma and Santa Rosa Railway, 261 S. Main St. Sebastopol, CA (Jones, Brainerd), NRHP-listed
- First Congregational Church, 16 5th St. Petaluma, CA (Jones, Brainerd). Now home of the Unitarian Universalists of Petaluma.

== Bibliography ==
- Rhinehart, Katherine J., Petaluma: A History in Architecture, Arcadia Publishing.
- Munro-Fraser, J. P. Alley, Bowen and Company, History of Sonoma County: Including its geology, topography, mountains, valleys and streams. Salem, Mass. : Higginson Book Co.
- Weinstein Dave, San Francisco Chronicle The man who built Petaluma: Brainerd Jones designed much of what is now the city's historic section, The Chronicle, Saturday, February 18, 2006.
