= Philip Sweed House =

- U.S. National Register of Historic Places
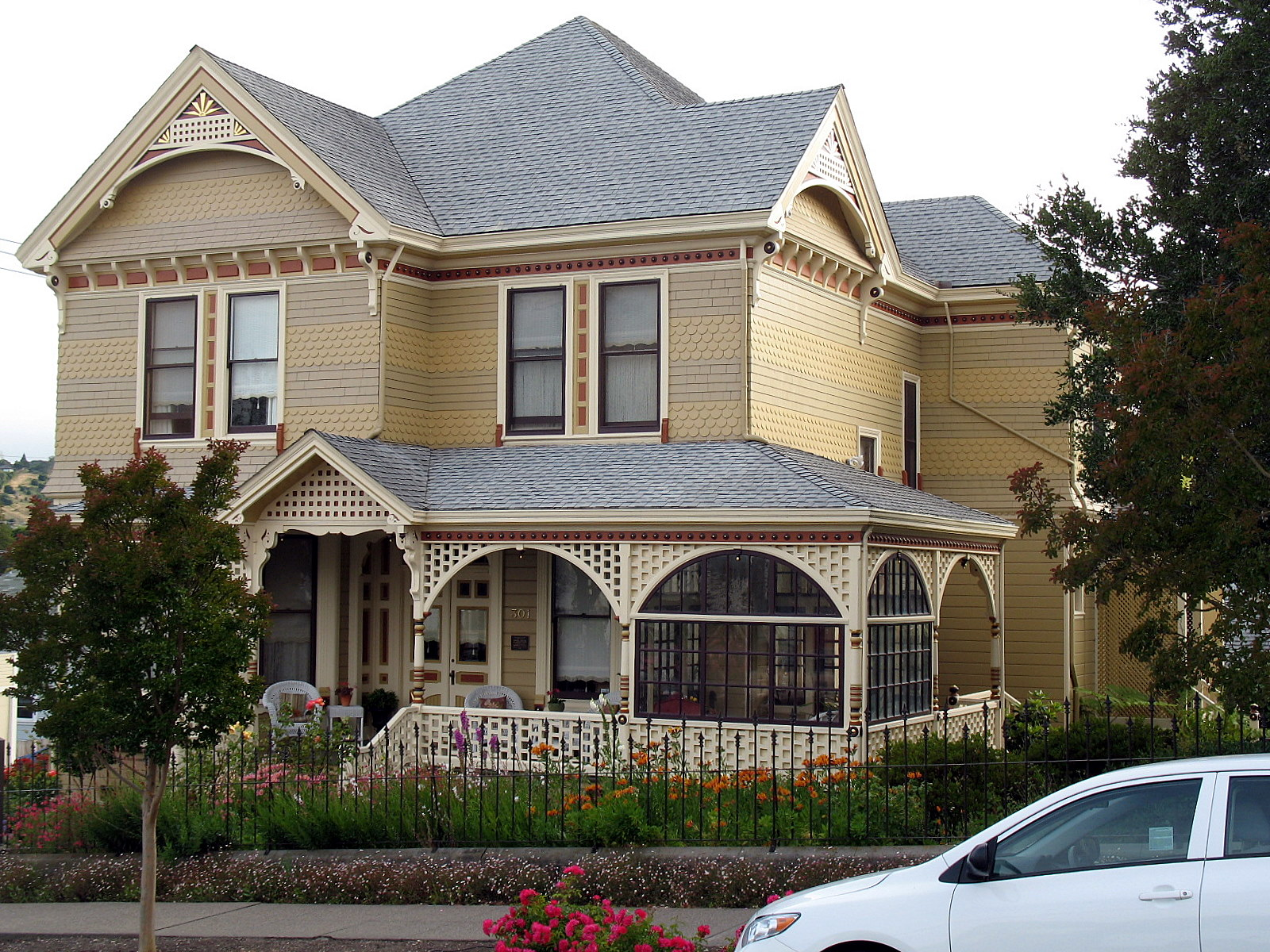

- Location within California Location within the United States
- Location: 301 Keokuk Street, Petaluma, California
- Coordinates: 38.236242°N 122.64623°W
- Area: 0.3 acres (0.12 ha)
- Built: 1892
- Built by: Samuel Rodd
- Architectural style: Queen Anne
- NRHP reference No.: 92000787
- Added to NRHP: June 18, 1992

The Philip Sweed House, in Petaluma, California, is a Queen Anne-style house built in 1892. It has sometimes, mistakenly, been reported as the "Philip Swede House."

The house is located at the intersection of Keokuk and Prospect Streets. It was listed on the National Register of Historic Places in 1992.

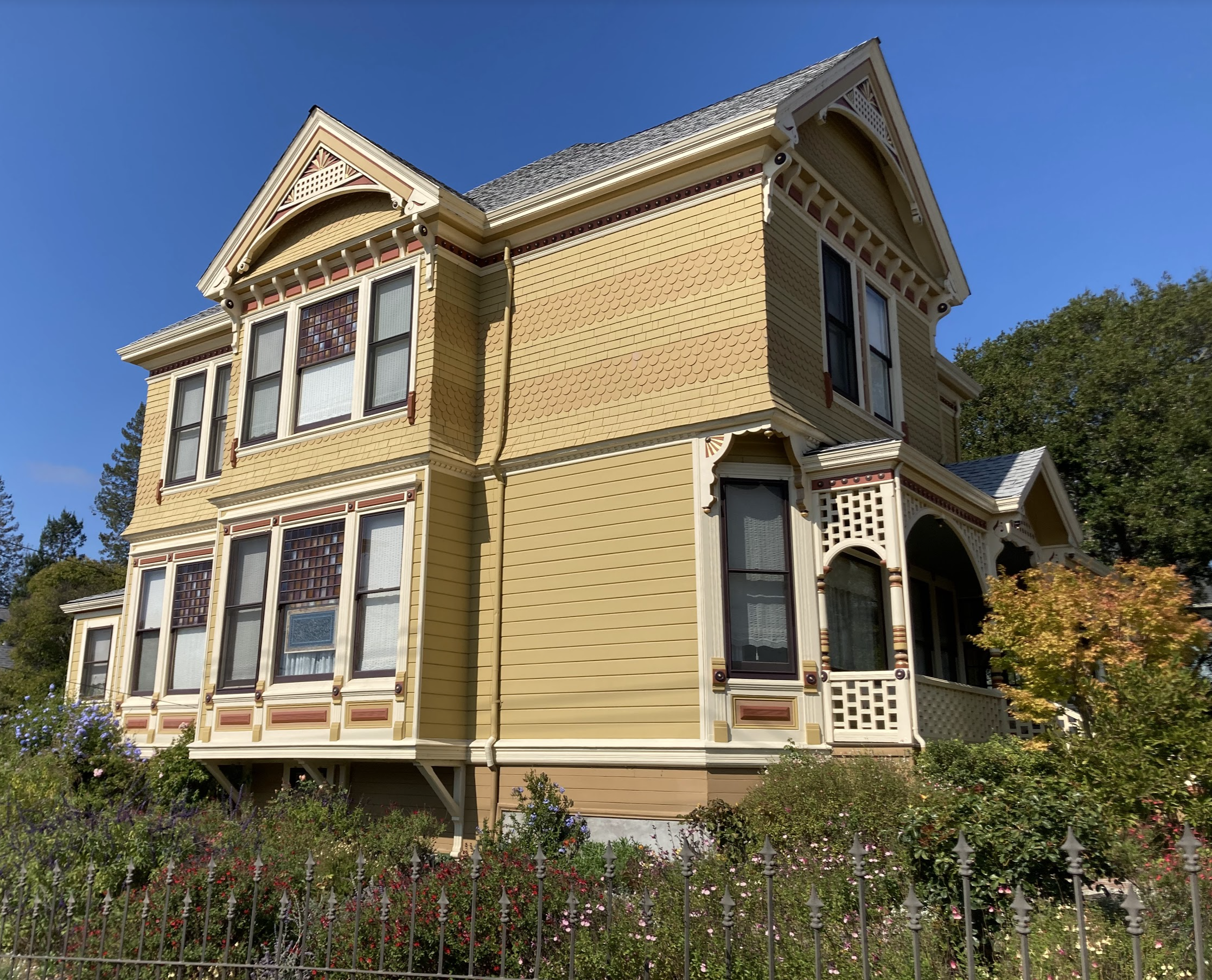
Southeast side of Sweed House in October, 2022.

Sweed, though of limited formal education himself, was a champion of public education and served on the city's Board of Education from 1893 to 1925.
