= Petaluma Historic Commercial District =

Historic district in California, United States

- U.S. National Register of Historic Places
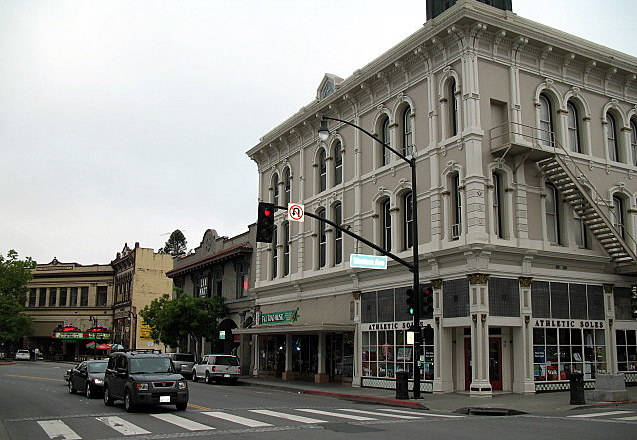
- Location: Along Petaluma Blvd., between B and Prospect Sts., Petaluma, California
- Area: 17.4 acres (7.0 ha)
- Architectural style: Italianate, Classical Revival
- NRHP reference No.: 95000354
- Added to NRHP: March 31, 1995

The Petaluma Historic Commercial District is a 17.4 acres (7.0 ha) historic district in Petaluma, California which was listed on the National Register of Historic Places in 1995. It is located along Petaluma Boulevard, between B St. and Prospect St.

It includes Italianate and Classical Revival architecture amongst its 63 contributing buildings and one contributing object.

It includes:

- Old Petaluma Opera House, at 147-149 Kentucky St., which is separately listed on the National Register.
- Herold Building, which has "a corner tower and bay windows"
- American Trust Building, a "carefully executed example of a classically designed bank from the 1920s"
- Hotel Petaluma, "the district's tallest building and the only one designed in the Mediterranean Revival style"
- Amy's Corporate headquarters, built in 1941 as a Leader department store, (later, Carither's,1946-85; Couches, Etc., 1986-2007), a 3-storey building that has a rounded corner and other features of the Streamline Moderne".
- Masonic Building (1882), 43-49 Petaluma Blvd. N., 7/9 Western Ave. Brick building with cast iron detailing, Italianate in style.
- McNear Building (1911), 23 Petaluma Blvd North.

== See also ==
- Petaluma, California#History
