= Mystic Theatre (Petaluma, California) =

Music venue in Petaluma, California

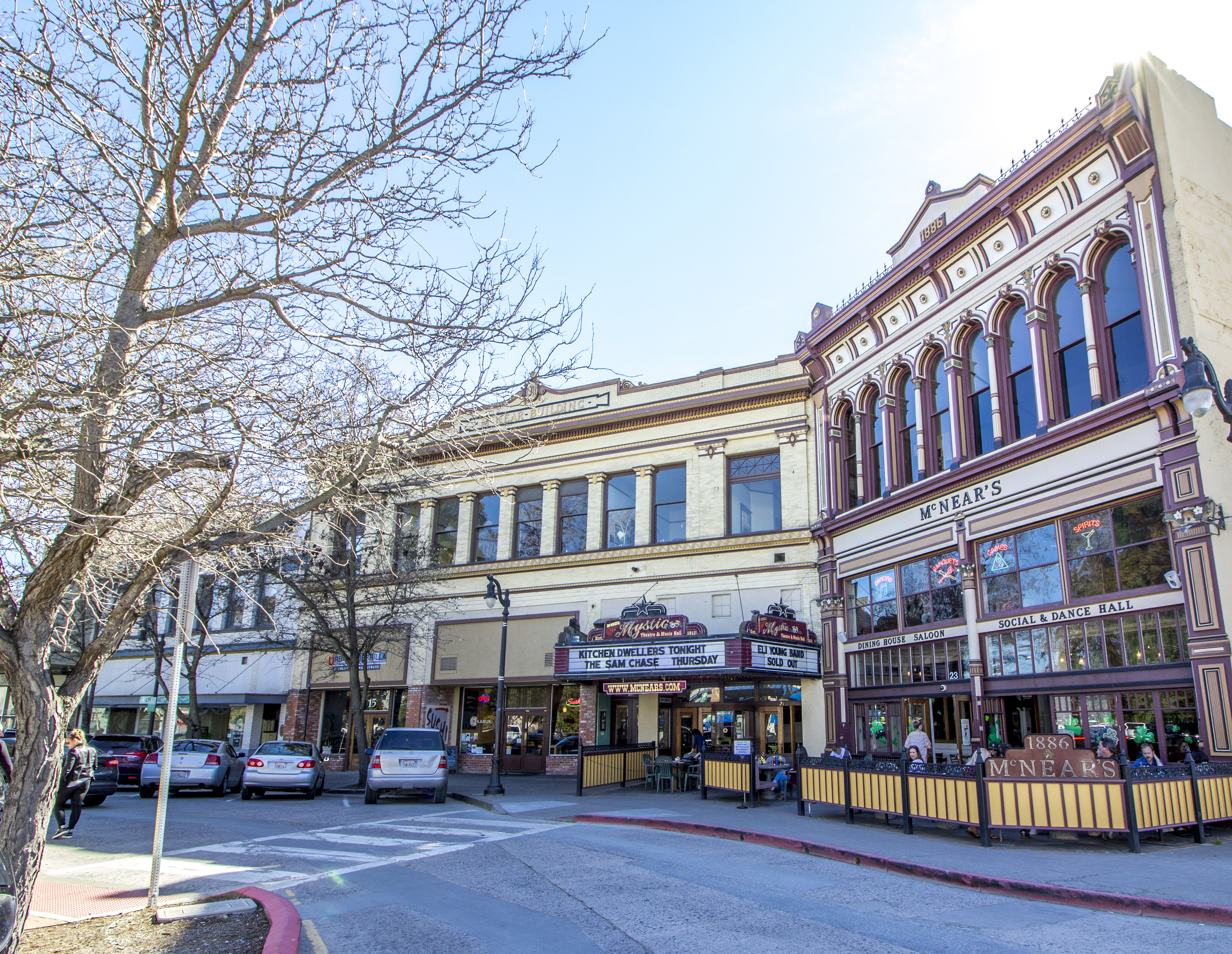
- Interactive map of Mystic Theatre
- Former names: 1911 McNear Building, State Theater, Plaza Theater, Palace Theater, Mystic Theater, McNears Mystic Theatre
- Address: 23 Petaluma Boulevard North, Petaluma, California, U.S.
- Coordinates: 38.234104°N 122.640120°W
- Type: Music venue

Construction
- Built: 1911
- Opened: July 19, 1992; 33 years ago

Website
- Official website

Mystic Theatre, also known as McNear's Mystic Theatre, is a historic building and music venue built in 1911, and located in Petaluma, California. The McNear's Saloon and Dining House is housed next door in an adjoined building.

The building is part of the Petaluma Historic Commercial District, which has been listed on the National Register of Historic Places since March 31, 1995.

== History ==
The building was built in 1911 and started as a vaudeville theater. Sometimes it was called the "1911 McNear Building" due to the building signage, it is adjoined to the "1886 McNear's Building", which as the name suggests was built in 1886. Both buildings were named after Petaluma pioneer, John Augustus McNear (1832–1918). Starting in the 1920s, the space served as a movie theater and went by many names including the State Theater, the Plaza Theater, and the Palace Theater.

On July 19, 1992, the venue opened as the Mystic Theatre with the first show, Arc Angels. Notable performers and bands that have played here include Van Morrison, Train, Iris DeMent, Stephen Marley, Warren Zevon, Carlos Santana, and Snoop Dogg. The band Train book one of their earliest shows at this venue (in the late 1990s).

Historical images of this building and neighboring buildings can be found in the Sonoma County Library Photograph Collection.

== See also ==
- National Register of Historic Places listings in Sonoma County, California
