= Free Public Library of Petaluma =

- U.S. National Register of Historic Places
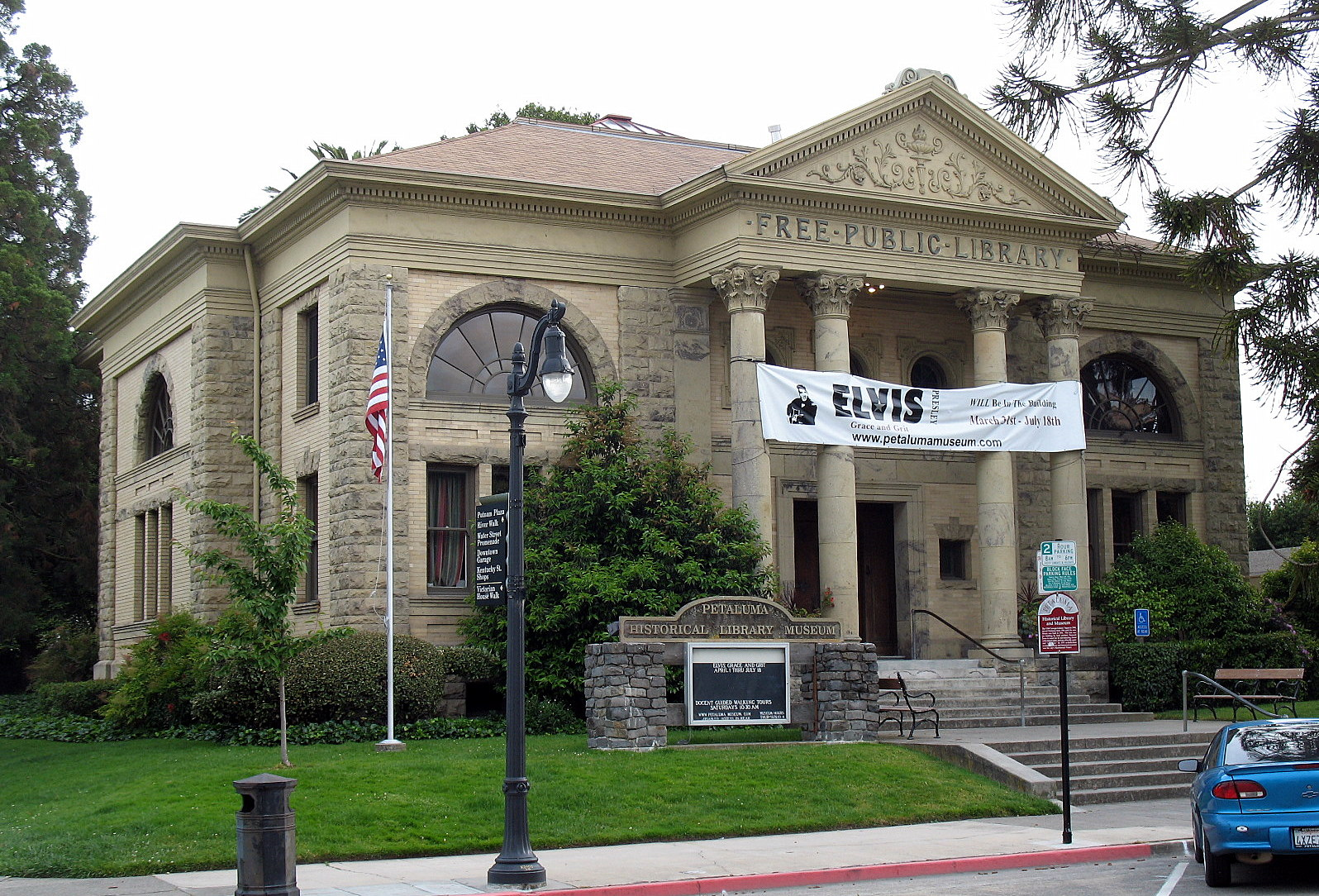

- Location within California
- Location: 20 Fourth Street in Petaluma, California, US
- Coordinates: 38°13′57″N 122°38′23.64″W
- Built: 1904
- Architect: Brainerd Jones
- Architectural style: Classical Revival
- NRHP reference No.: 88000925
- Added to NRHP: June 23, 1988

The Free Public Library of Petaluma (also Old Carnegie Library, Carnegie Free Library and Petaluma Historical Library and Museum) is a research library and history museum at 20 Fourth Street in Petaluma, Sonoma County, California, US. Built in 1904 as a Carnegie Free Library, it was designed by Brainerd Jones as his first major commission before the architect gained regional recognition. In the 1970s, it was re-purposed as a research library and historical museum, known as the Petaluma Historical Library and Museum. The building is listed on the National Register of Historic Places.

== History ==
Petaluma's first library, an Odd Fellows library, dates to 1858, which was opened to the public within a decade, and by 1878, its ownership was transferred to the city as part of the Rogers Free Library Act. Funding for the Carnegie library came from local donations totaling $7,500 and Andrew Carnegie's donation of $12,500. It was built by R.W. Moller and W.S. Stradling from a design by Jones, with this being his first major commission before the architect gained regional recognition. The library opened in early 1906. On April 18, the building was seriously damaged following an earthquake. With few changes through the decades, the building served as a Carnegie Free Library until 1976. In 1988, it was listed on the National Register of Historic Places. It is now a historical museum with research library.

== Architecture and fittings ==
Construction began in 1904 in the Classical Revival architectural style using quarried stone from Stony Point. The entrance is two-storied, with pediments and columns. The interior includes a vaulted ceiling, leaded glass skylight, and wood paneling. There are fan-glass windows, round leaded-glass windows, and a leaded glass dome which is the largest free-standing one in Northern California.

== Collections ==
The Hoppy Hopkins Memorial Research Library, named after local historian Hoppy Hopkins (1921-2003), supports the locality's historical, genealogical, and architectural research with items such as maps, blueprints, newspapers, city directories, and yearbooks. The museum features items relating to the area's history, such as the Miwok people, and the poultry and dairy industries.

== Grounds ==
The building was constructed upon a lot on the corner of Fourth and B streets. Carnegie required that the land be contributed by the city of Petaluma; and the lot was sold to the city by civic leader Addie Atwater. Three of the trees on the lot, a Giant Sequoia, a California Live Oak, and a Bunya-Bunya, are registered Heritage or landmark trees.

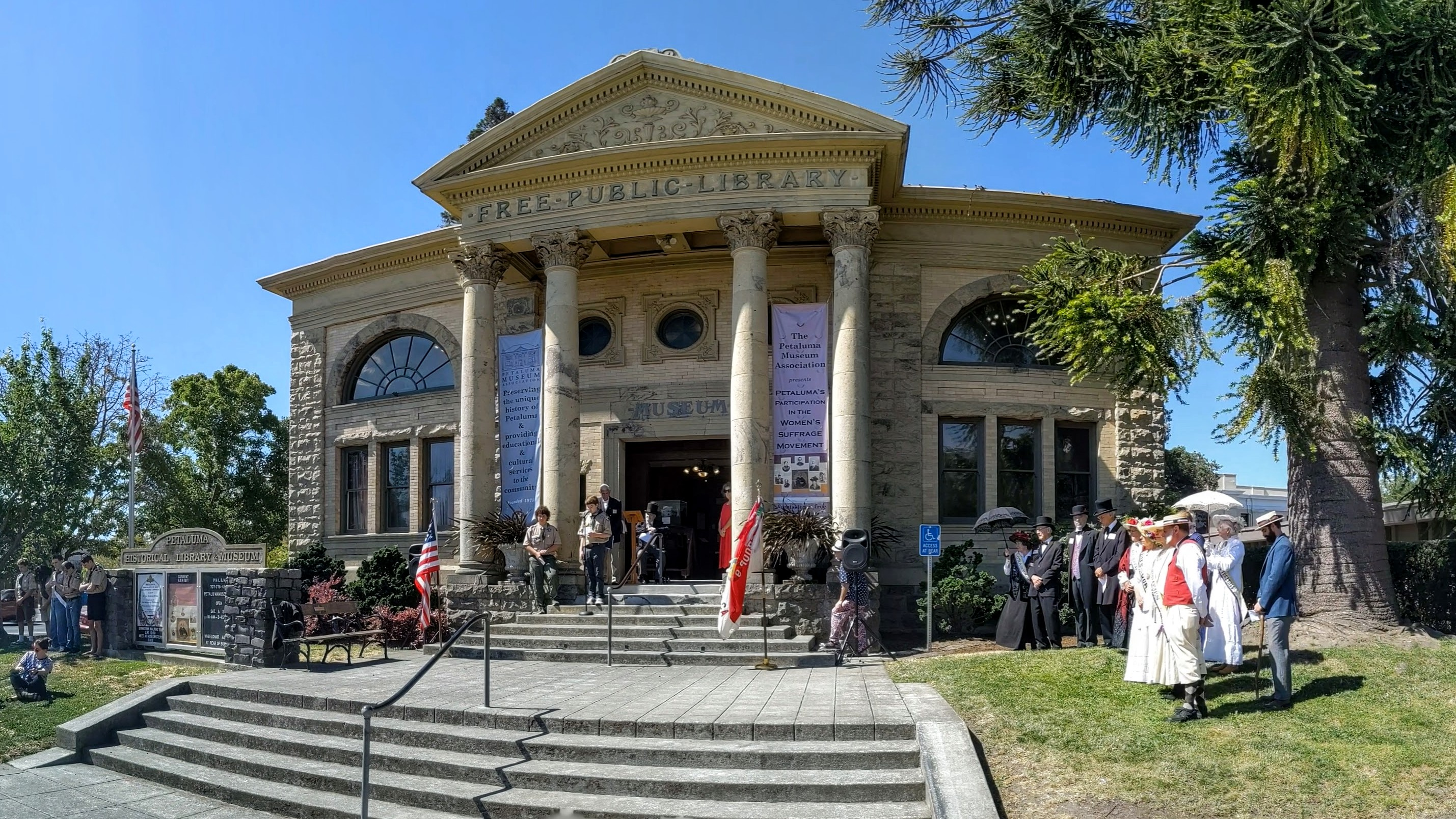
Panoramic view of the Petaluma Historical Library and Museum during their 2021 Independence Day celebration, with old-time costumes and boy scouts
