= Mystery Theater =

Mystery theater or Mystery theatre could refer to:

- ABC Mystery Theater, radio program and television series, 1951–54
- CBS Radio Mystery Theater, radio program, 1974–82
- Crawford Mystery Theatre, TV program, 1951–21
- Mollé Mystery Theatre, radio program, 1943–48
