= Old Petaluma Opera House =

- U.S. National Register of Historic Places
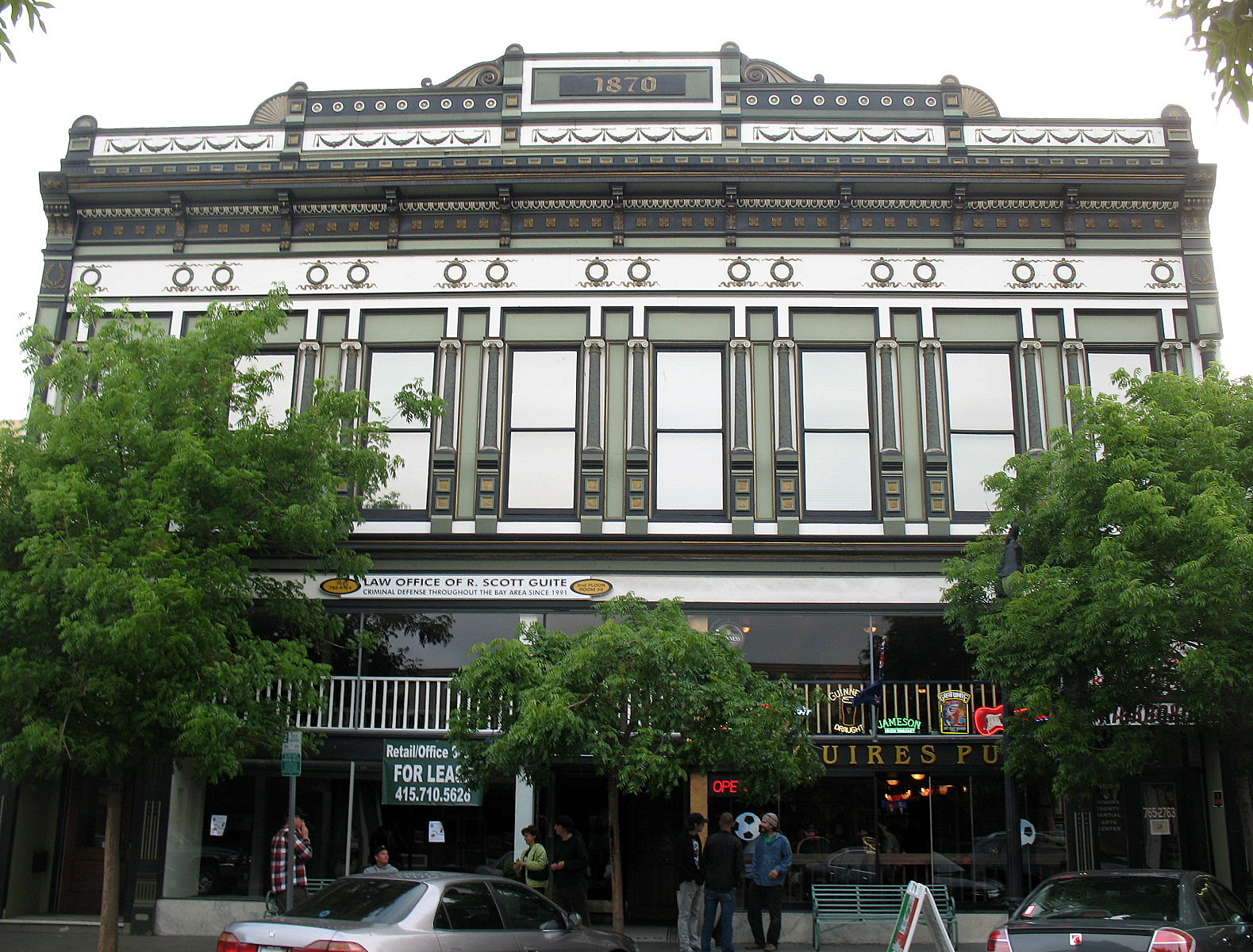

- Location within California Location within the United States
- Location: 147-149 Kentucky St., Petaluma, California
- Coordinates: 38°14′5.8″N 122°38′31.5″W
- Area: 0.1 acres (0.040 ha)
- Built: 1870
- Architect: Brainerd Jones
- Architectural style: Beaux Arts, Stick/Eastlake
- NRHP reference No.: 78000801
- Added to NRHP: December 22, 1978

The Old Petaluma Opera House (also known as the Maclay Building) is a historic building located in downtown Petaluma, California.

== History ==
It was built in 1870 as a theater, lecture hall, and dance hall. In 1901, the upper floors were converted to office and meeting space and the street level was remodeled for retail space, and a new prefabricated cast iron facade, manufactured by the Mesker Brothers company of St. Louis, Missouri was installed.

The Nielsen Furniture Company occupied the building from 1944 to 1960. As of June 2010, the building houses law offices and an Irish-style pub. It features Stick/Eastlake architecture.

It was listed on the National Register of Historic Places in 1978.
