= Petaluma, California =

City in California, United States

- City
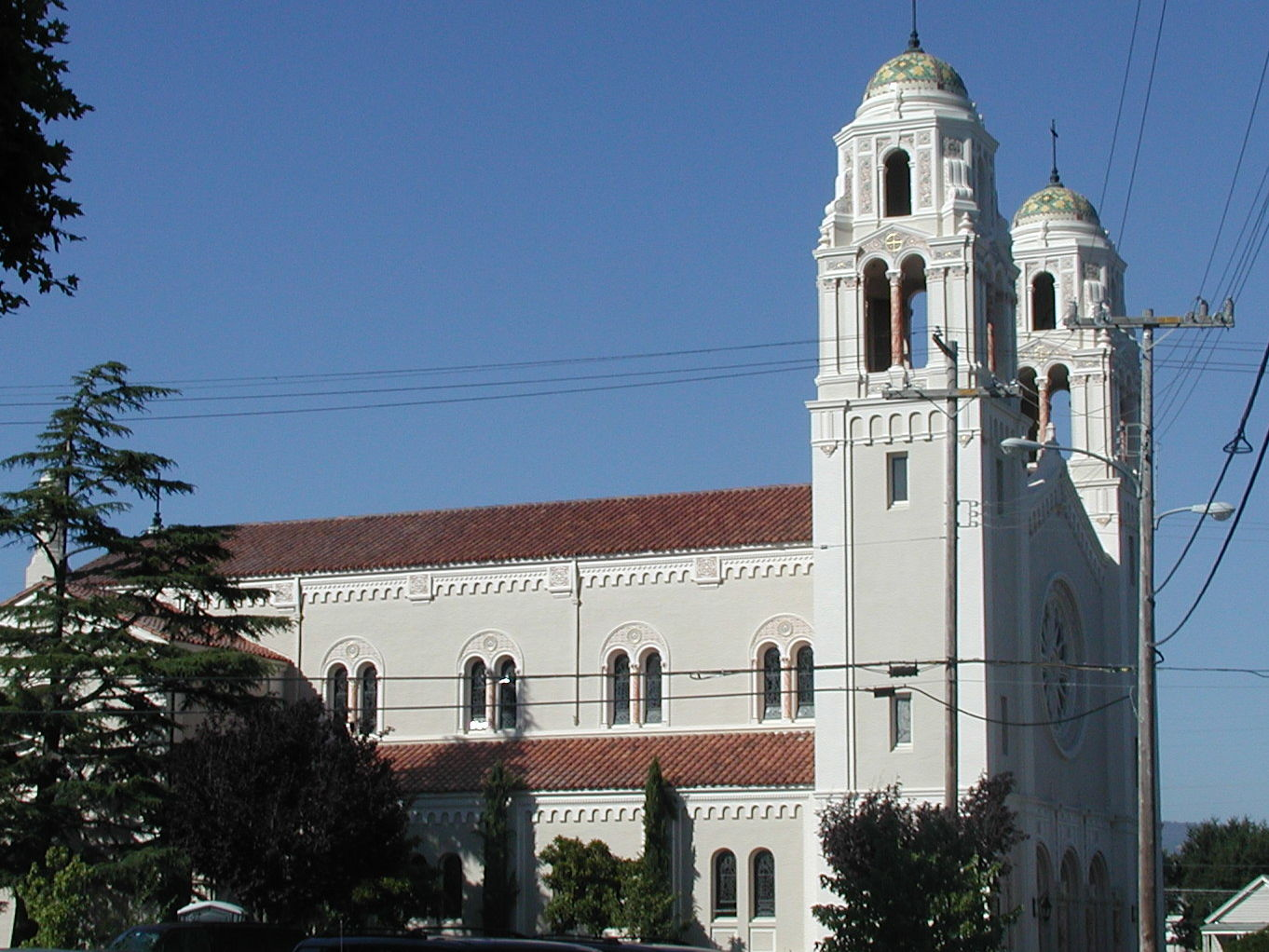
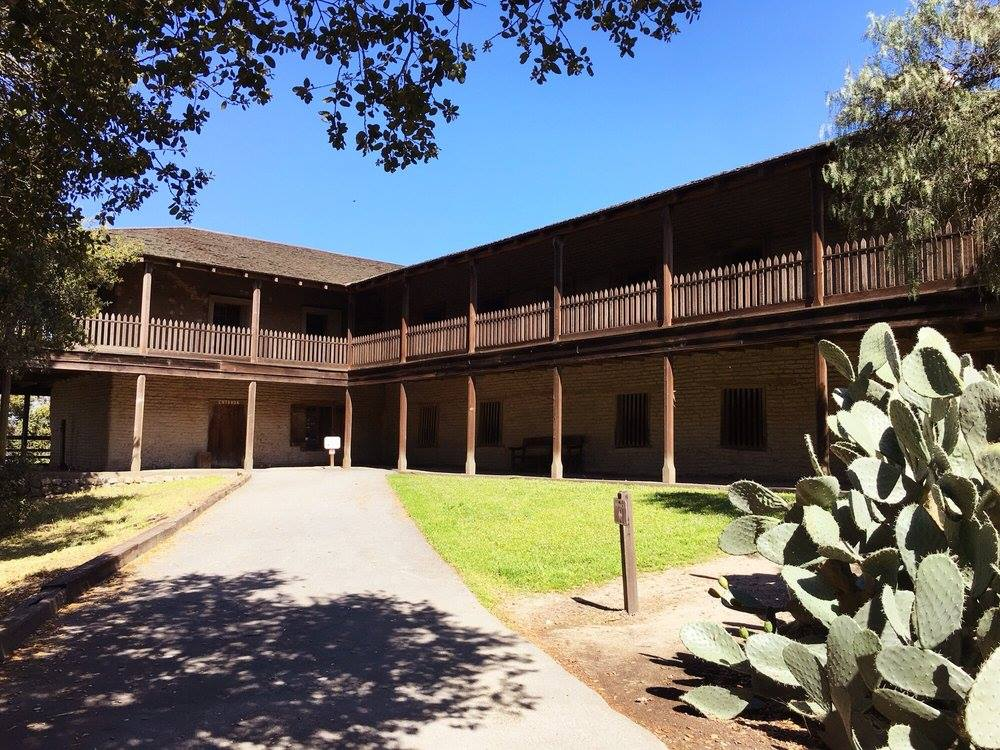
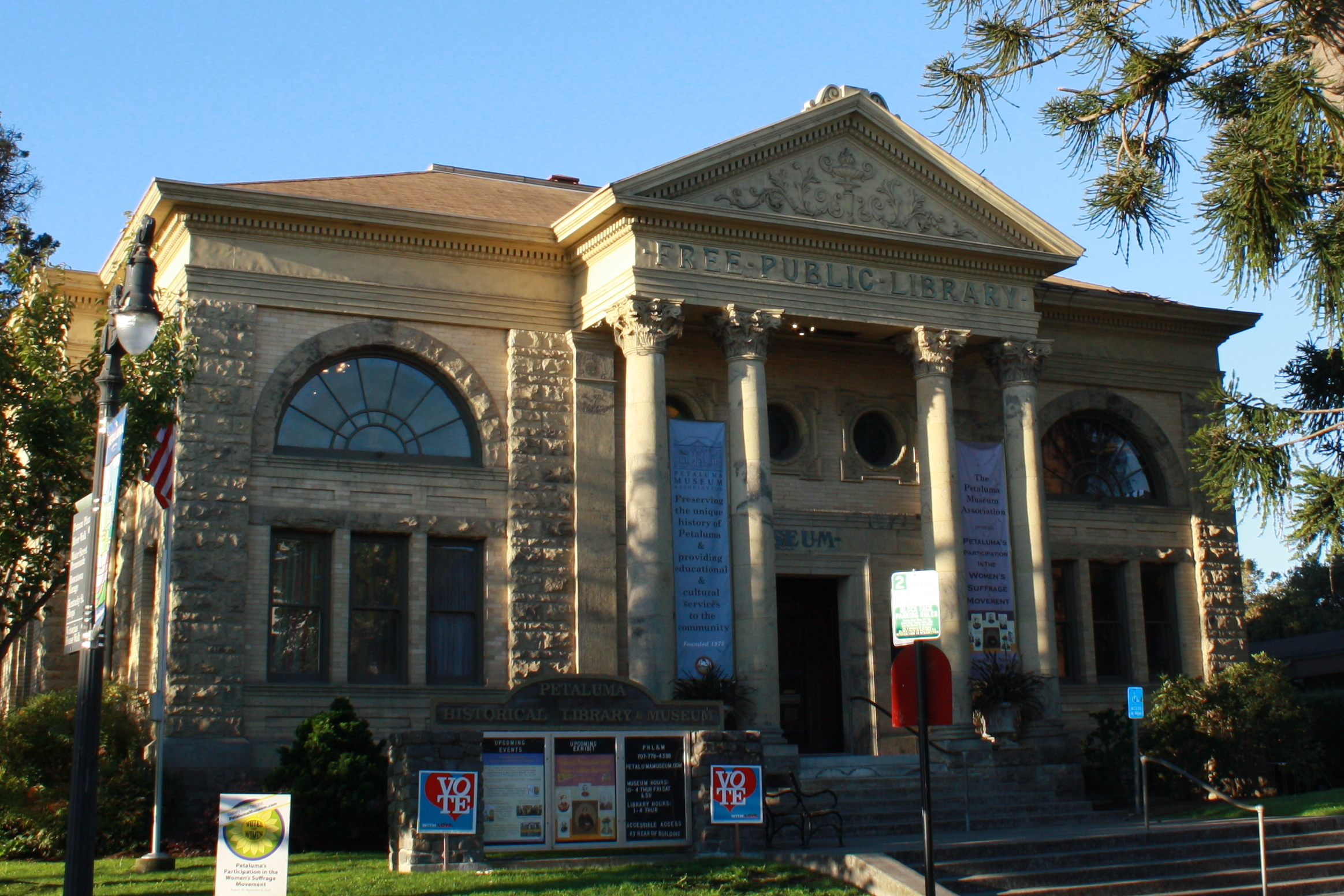
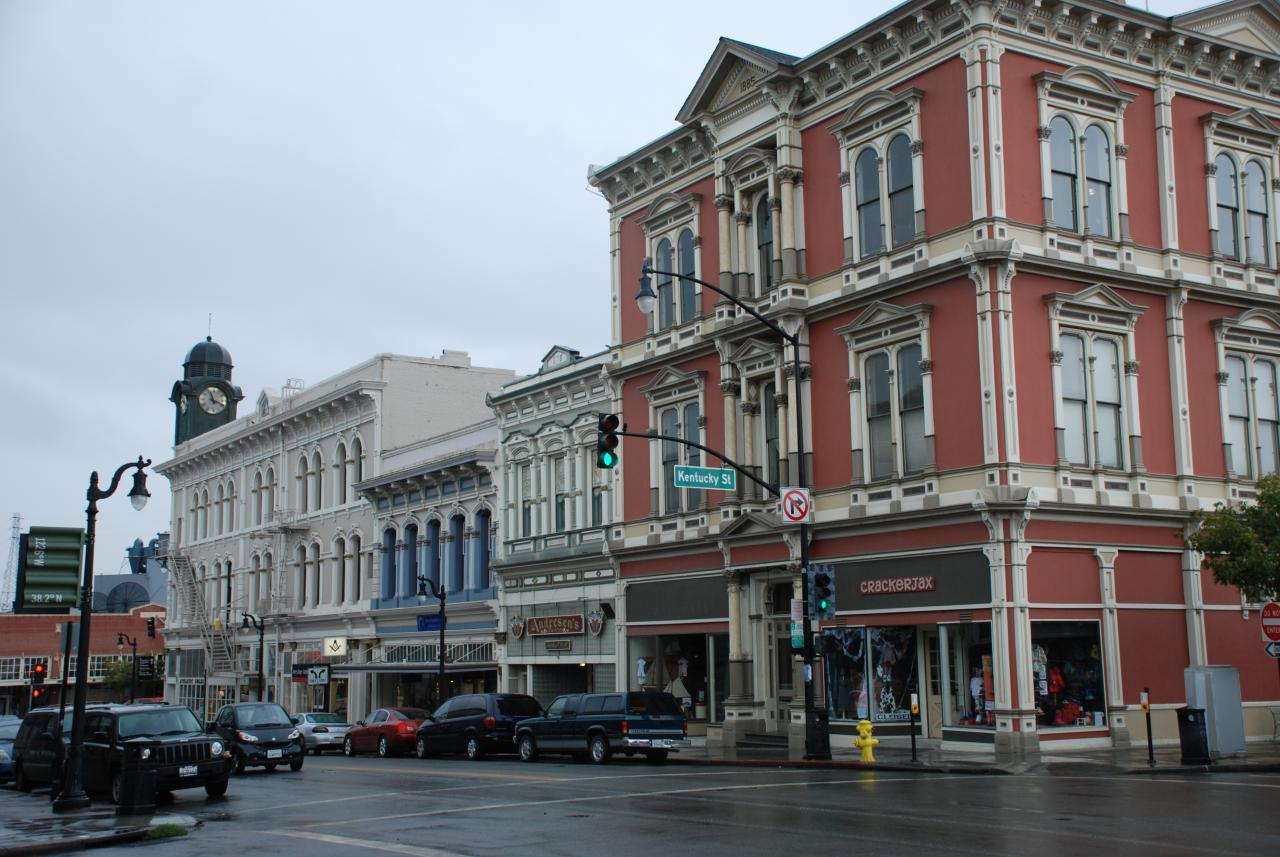
- Clockwise from top left: St. Vincent de Paul Church; Rancho Petaluma, Petaluma Historic Commercial District; Petaluma Historical Library and Museum

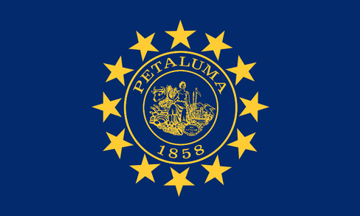
- Flag
- Etymology: Péta Lúuma, Coast Miwok for "Backside of the Hill"
- Interactive map of Petaluma, California
- Location in California Location in the United States
- Coordinates: 38°14′45″N 122°37′53″W
- Country: United States
- State: California
- County: Sonoma
- Incorporated: April 12, 1858

Government
  - Type: Council–manager
  - Mayor: Kevin McDonnell
  - Vice Mayor: Karen Nau
  - City Manager: Peggy Flynn

Area
  - Total: 14.52 sq mi (37.61 km^{2})
  - Land: 14.42 sq mi (37.34 km^{2})
  - Water: 0.11 sq mi (0.28 km^{2}) 0.74%
- Elevation: 13 ft (4 m)

Population (2020)
  - Total: 59,776
  - Density: 4,146.8/sq mi (1,601.1/km^{2})
- Time zone: UTC−8 (Pacific)
  - Summer (DST): UTC−7 (PDT)
- ZIP codes: 94952–94954
- Area code: 707, 369
- FIPS code: 06-56784
- GNIS feature IDs: 277575, 2411407
- Website: cityofpetaluma.org

Petaluma is a city in Sonoma County, California, United States, located in the North Bay region of the San Francisco Bay Area. Its population was 59,776 according to the 2020 census.

Petaluma's name comes from the Miwok village named Péta Lúuma that was located on the banks of the Petaluma River. The modern city originates in Rancho Petaluma, granted in 1834 to famed Californio statesman Mariano Guadalupe Vallejo, considered to be the founder of Petaluma. Today, Petaluma is known for its well-preserved historic center and as a local hub for the Petaluma Valley region of Sonoma County.

== History ==
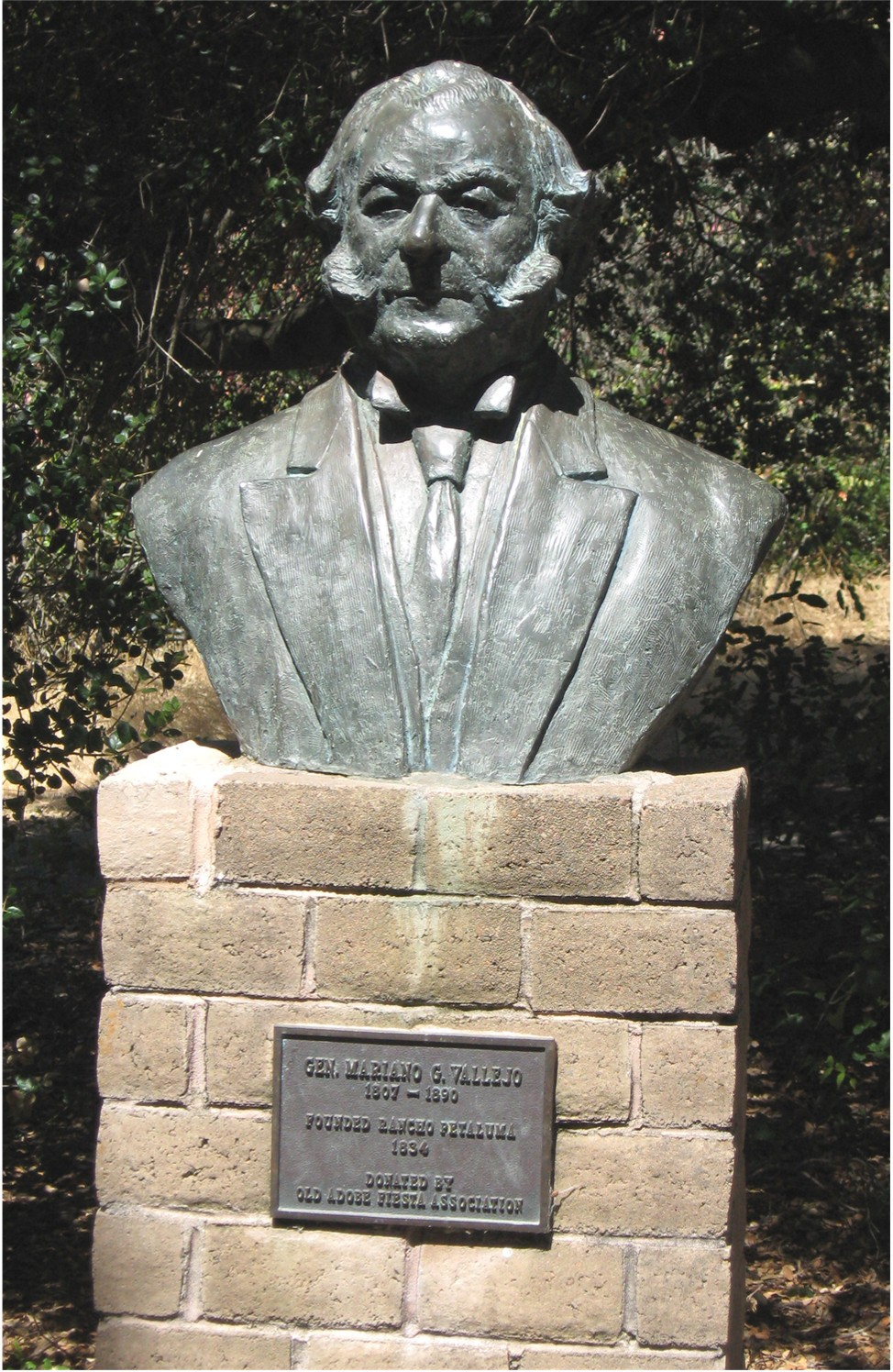
The Bust of General Mariano G. Vallejo, erected in 1975, honoring Petaluma's founder, Mariano Guadalupe Vallejo.

The Coast Miwok resided throughout Marin and southern Sonoma County. The village of Péta Lúuma (Coast Miwok for "backside of the hill", or "sloping ridge") was east of the Petaluma River, with a number of other Coast Miwok villages nearby: Wotoki was immediately to the south of Péta Lúuma, on the opposite side of the river; Etem, Likatiut, and Tuchayalin were near today's downtown; and Tulme and Susuli were just north of today's city limits.

The Petaluma area was part of a 66,000-acre (270 km^{2}) 1834 Mexican land grant by Governor Jose Figueroa to Mariano Guadalupe Vallejo called Rancho Petaluma. In 1836, Vallejo ordered construction of his Rancho Petaluma Adobe, a ranch house near Petaluma, which his family often used as a summer home, while he resided in the neighboring town of Sonoma. Vallejo's influence and Mexican control in the region began to decline after Vallejo's arrest during the Bear Flag Revolt in 1846.

Pioneers moved to Petaluma from the eastern United States after James Marshall found gold in the Sierra Nevada in 1848. The town's position on the Petaluma River in the heart of productive farmland was critical to its growth during the 19th and early 20th centuries. Sailing scows, such as the scow schooner Alma (1892), and steamers plied the river between Petaluma and San Francisco, carrying agricultural produce and raw materials to the burgeoning city of San Francisco during the California Gold Rush.

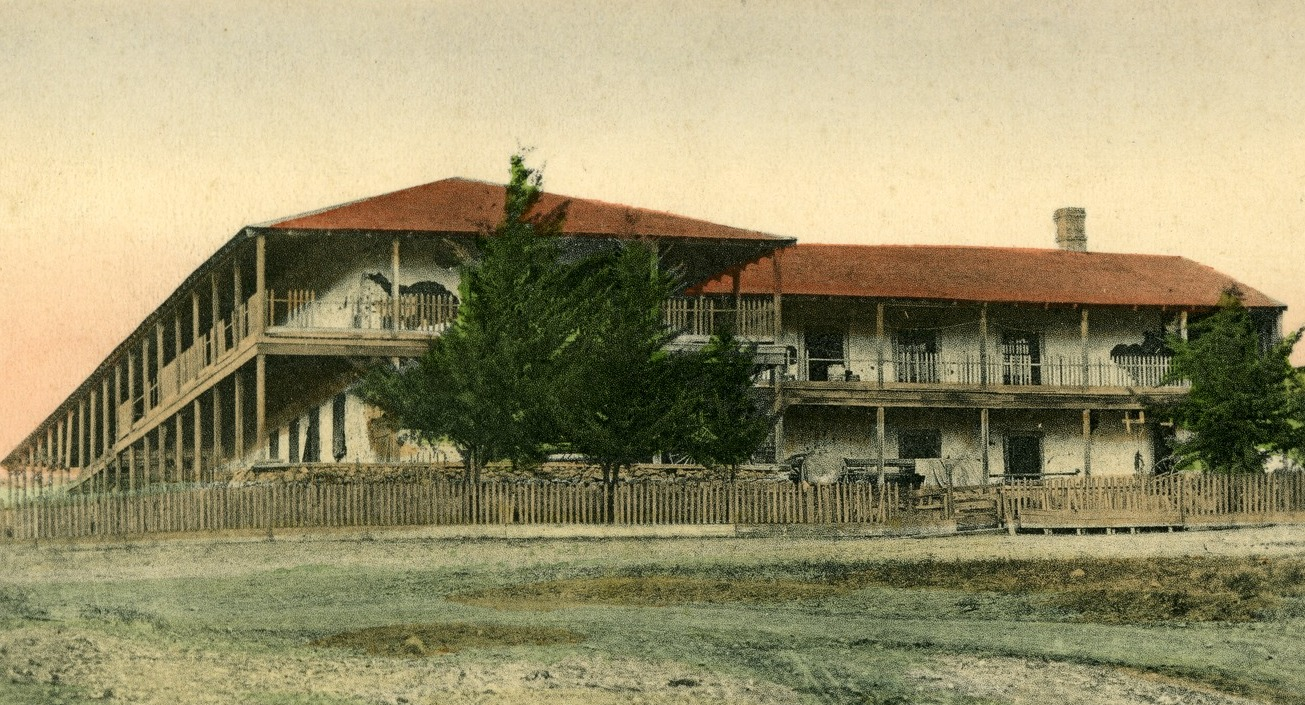
Built in 1836, the Vallejo Adobe at Rancho Petaluma was the largest privately owned adobe in California.

There were brothels downtown along Petaluma Boulevard, which used to be the main thoroughfare until U.S. Highway 101 was constructed in the 1950s. The Petaluma Historic Commercial District is listed on the National Register of Historic Places.

The Sonoma County Bank Building was the home of the Baker Creek Heirloom Seed Company and the Petaluma Seed Bank until 2019. It was built in 1926.

Petaluma soon became known for its grain milling and chicken processing industries, which continue to the present day as a smaller fraction of its commerce. At one time, Petaluma was known as the "Egg Capital of the World," sparking such nicknames as "Chickaluma". Petaluma hosted the only known poultry drugstore and is the place where the coal lamp egg incubator was invented by Lyman Byce in 1879.

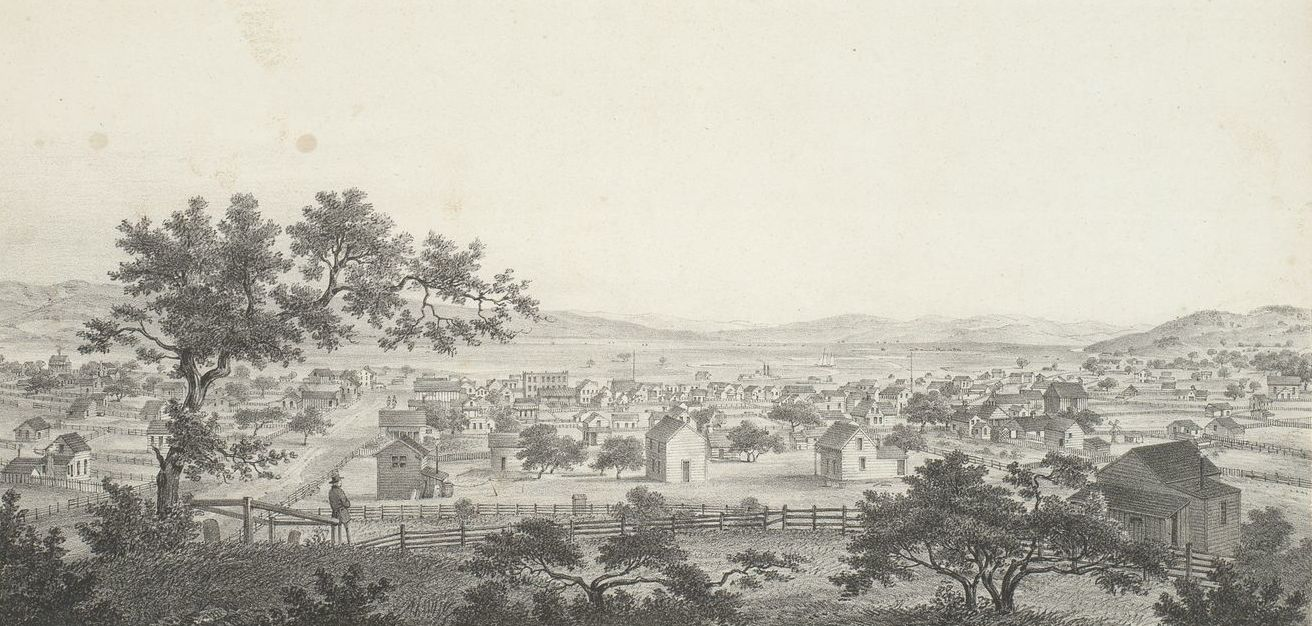
View of Petaluma in 1857

One of the largest historic chicken processing plants still stands in the central area of town; this 1930s brick building is no longer used for the chicken industry, but is being evaluated for preservation and change of use. While it is no longer known as the Egg Capital of the World, Petaluma maintains a strong agricultural base today with dairy farms, olive groves, vineyards, and berry and vegetable farms.

According to the Army Museum at the Presidio, San Francisco, Petaluma was relatively unharmed during the San Francisco earthquake of April 18, 1906, due to significant stable bedrock underlying the region. As one of the few communities in the region left standing after the earthquake, Petaluma was the staging point for most Sonoma County rescue and relief efforts.

There are extant pre-1906 buildings and Victorian homes on the western side of the river. The downtown area has suffered many river floods over the years and during the Depression commerce declined. A lack of funds prevented the demolition of the old homes and buildings. In the 1960s there was a counterculture migration out of San Francisco into Marin County and southern Sonoma County, in search of inexpensive housing in a less urban environment. The old Victorian, Queen Anne and Eastlake-style houses were restored. Historic iron-front buildings in the downtown commercial district were also rescued. Traffic and new home development for the most part was rerouted to the east of downtown by the construction of Highway 101.

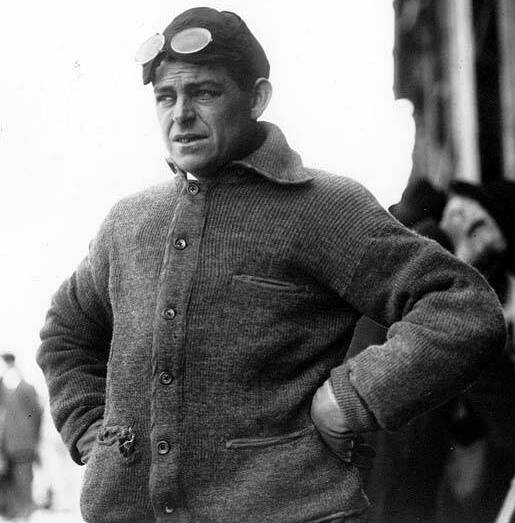
Amateur pilot Frederick Joseph Wiseman

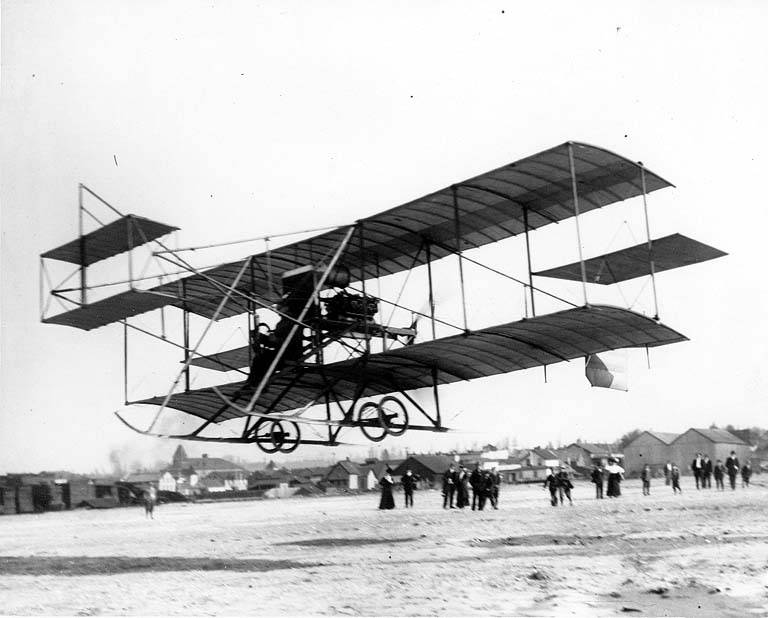
Fred J. Wiseman also piloted his biplane on the first airmail flight from Petaluma to Santa Rosa.

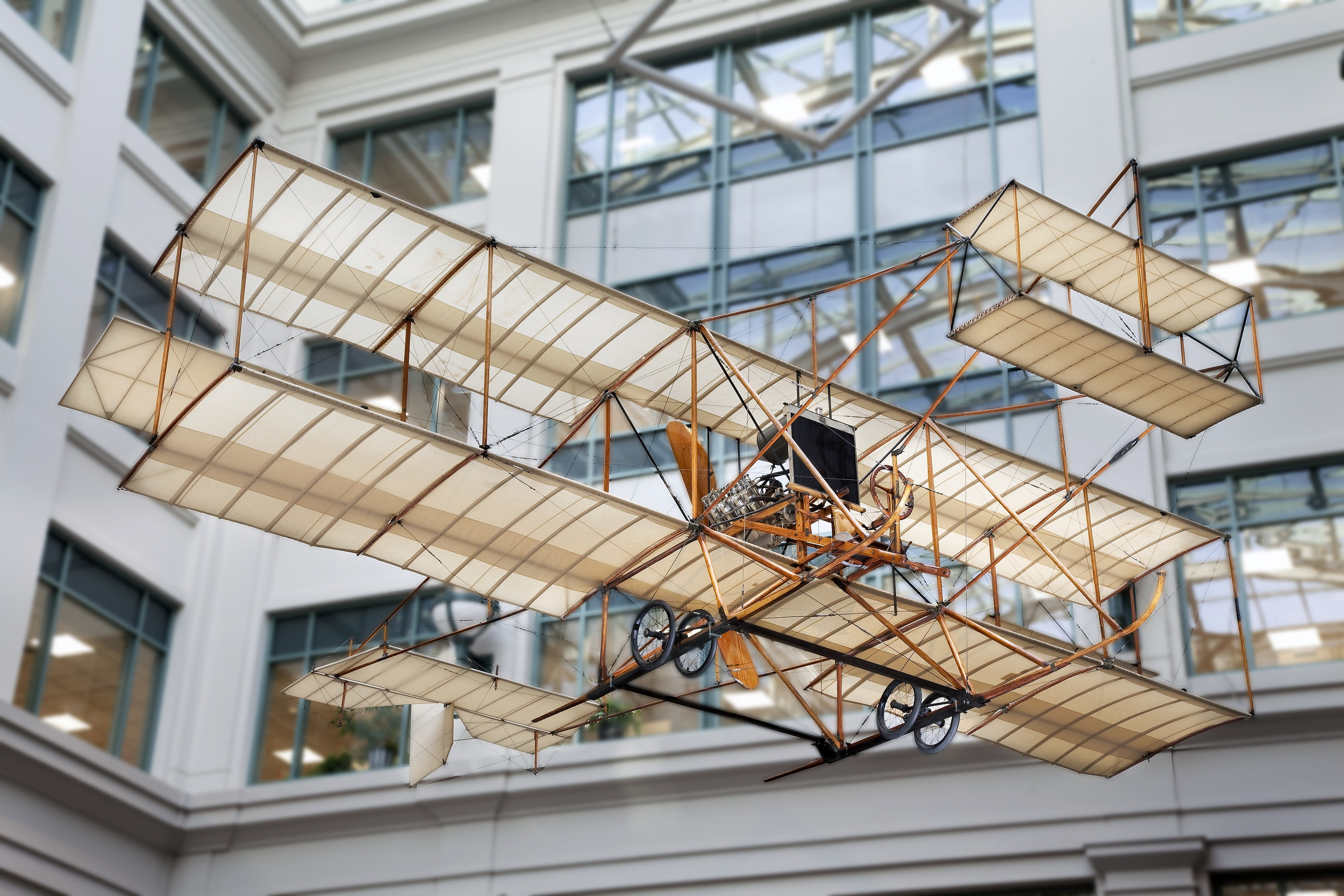
Wiseman-Cooke aircraft in National Air and Space Museum

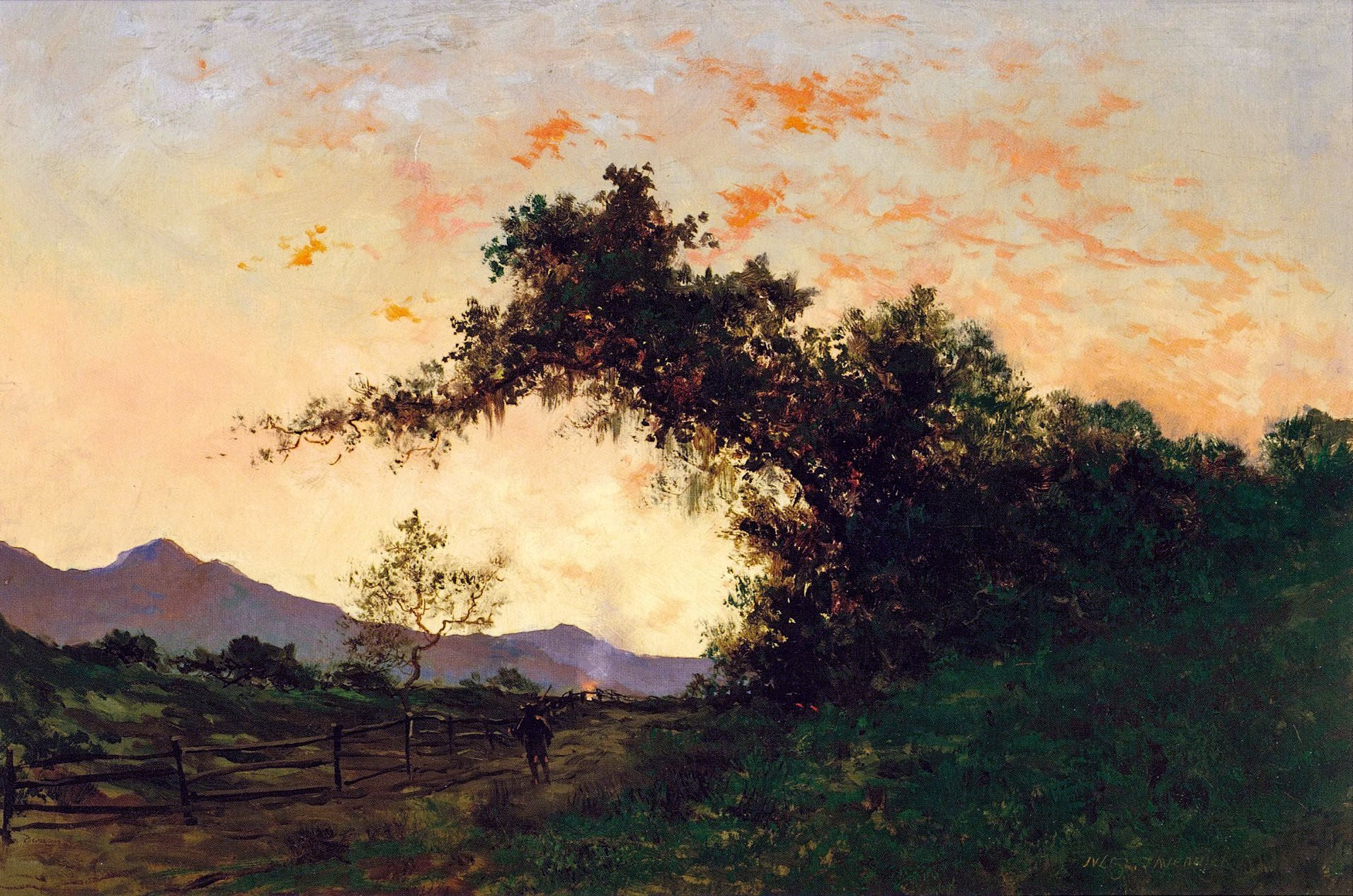
Marin Sunset in Back of Petaluma (1880s), by Jules Tavernier

The first official airmail flight took place on February 18, 1911, when Fred J. Wiseman transported a handful of mail from Petaluma to Santa Rosa, including letters from Petaluma postmaster John E. Olmstead and the mayor of Petaluma. Wiseman's plane ended up in the National Air and Space Museum.

There was a substantial influx of Jewish residents to the area in the first three decades of the 20th century. Most of the settlers were secular Eastern European Jews; they founded today's B'nai Israel Jewish Center as a secular Jewish community center with no rabbi and only a small area for prayer. The community became active in the poultry industry, and some settlers joined the local labor movement and participated in leftist political organizing, leading to significant conflicts between integrationists who aimed to quietly integrate into Petaluma society and socialists who hoped to change it.

With its large stock of historic buildings, Petaluma has been used as the filming location for numerous movies set in the 1940s through the 1960s (see list of movies below). The historic McNear Building is a common film location.

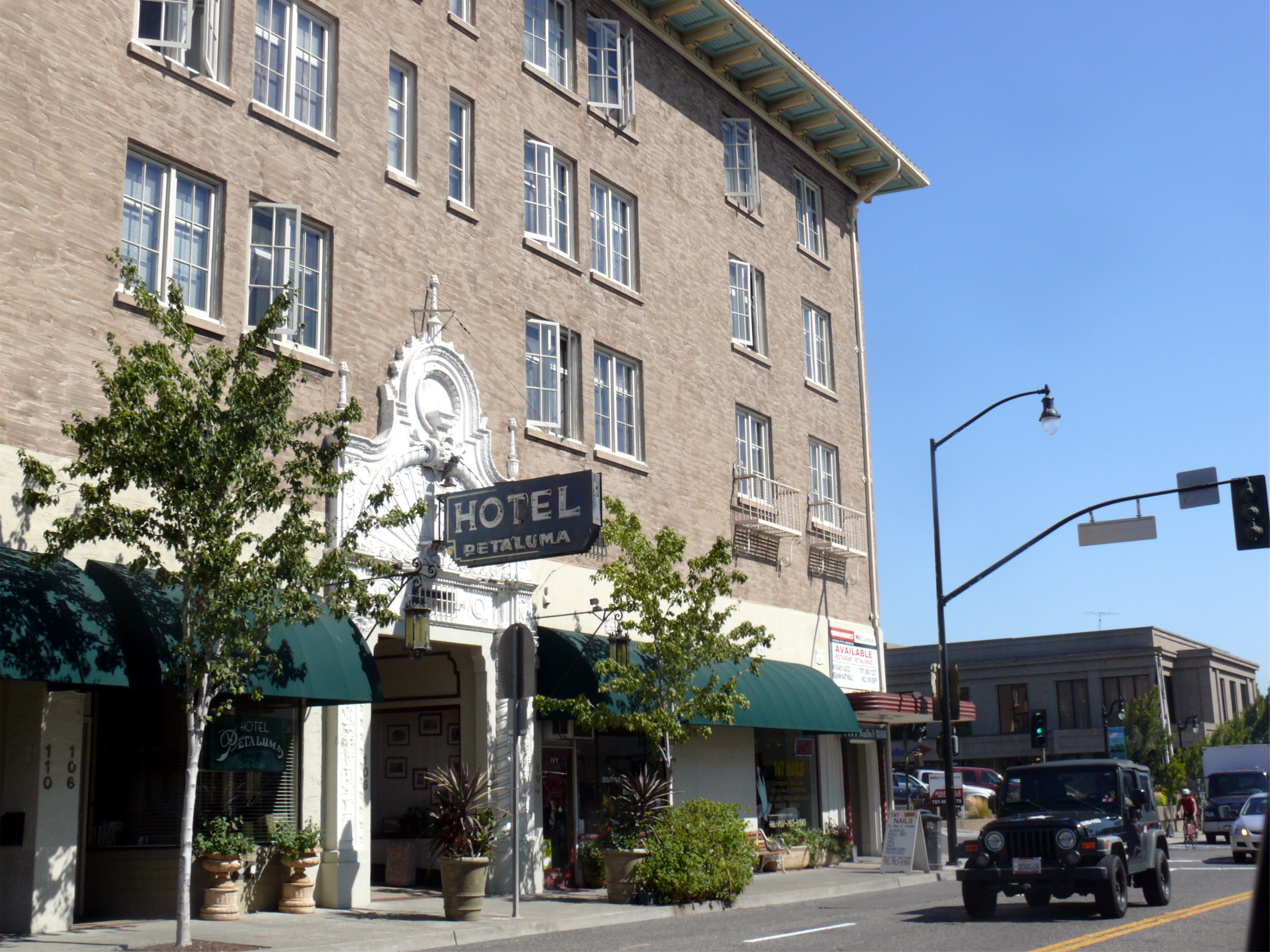
Hotel Petaluma

Petaluma pioneered the time-controlled approach to development. After Highway 101 was re-aligned as a freeway in 1955, residential development permits tripled, from 300 in 1969 to 900 in 1971. Because of the region's soaring population in the sixties, the city enacted the "Petaluma Plan" in 1971. This plan limited the number of building permits to 500 annually for a five-year period beginning in 1972. At the same time Petaluma created a redbelt around the town as a boundary for urban expansion for a stated number of years. Similar to Ramapo, New York, a Residential Development Control System was created to distribute the building permits based on a point system conforming to the city's general plan to provide for low and moderate income housing and divide development somewhat equally between east and west and single family and multi-family housing.

The stated objectives of Petaluma's time controlled growth management were to ensure orderly growth; to protect the city's small town character and surrounding green space; to provide a variety of housing choices; and to maintain adequate water supply and sewage treatment facilities.

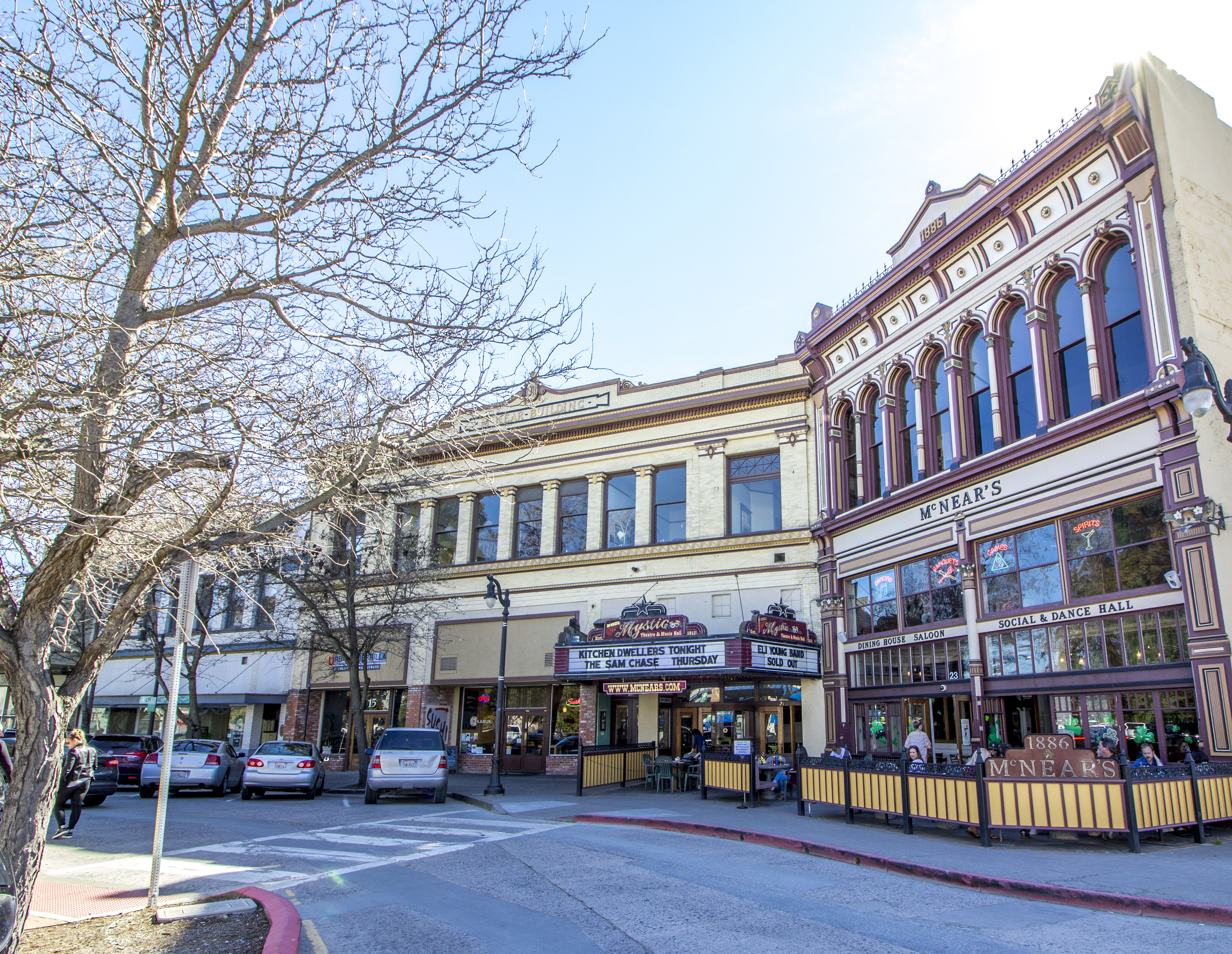
Petaluma Historic Commercial District

The controlled development plan attracted national attention in 1975 when the city was taken to court by the Construction Industry Association. The city's restriction was upheld by the 9th Circuit Court in 1975 and the Supreme Court denied a petition for writ of certiorari in 1976. This court ruling still forms the foundation for most local growth management ordinances in California.

Despite this history of planned development, the Petaluma City Council voted on April 13, 2009, to eliminate the entire planning department and lay off the whole planning staff. Planning Division responsibilities were subsequently contracted out to the consulting firm Metropolitan Planning Group, which re-hired some of the former planning staff and continues to operate planning services for the city.

In the late 1990s, Petaluma was also known as Telecom Valley due to the telecom startup companies that seemed to multiply from one another, and offer great riches for early stockholders and employees. Two success stories were that of Advanced Fibre Communications (AFC) (now Tellabs), and Cerent, which was purchased by Cisco. Some Cerent employees went on to purchase the Phoenix Theater, a local entertainment venue, which was once an opera house.

In 2021, Petaluma established a goal of achieving carbon neutrality by 2030. In March of that year, the city formally prohibited construction of new gas stations, becoming the first municipality in the world to enact such a ban. The city also streamlined the process of building EV charging stations and potential hydrogen filling stations.

The city has identified about two dozen buildings and districts as Petaluma landmarks.

== Geography ==
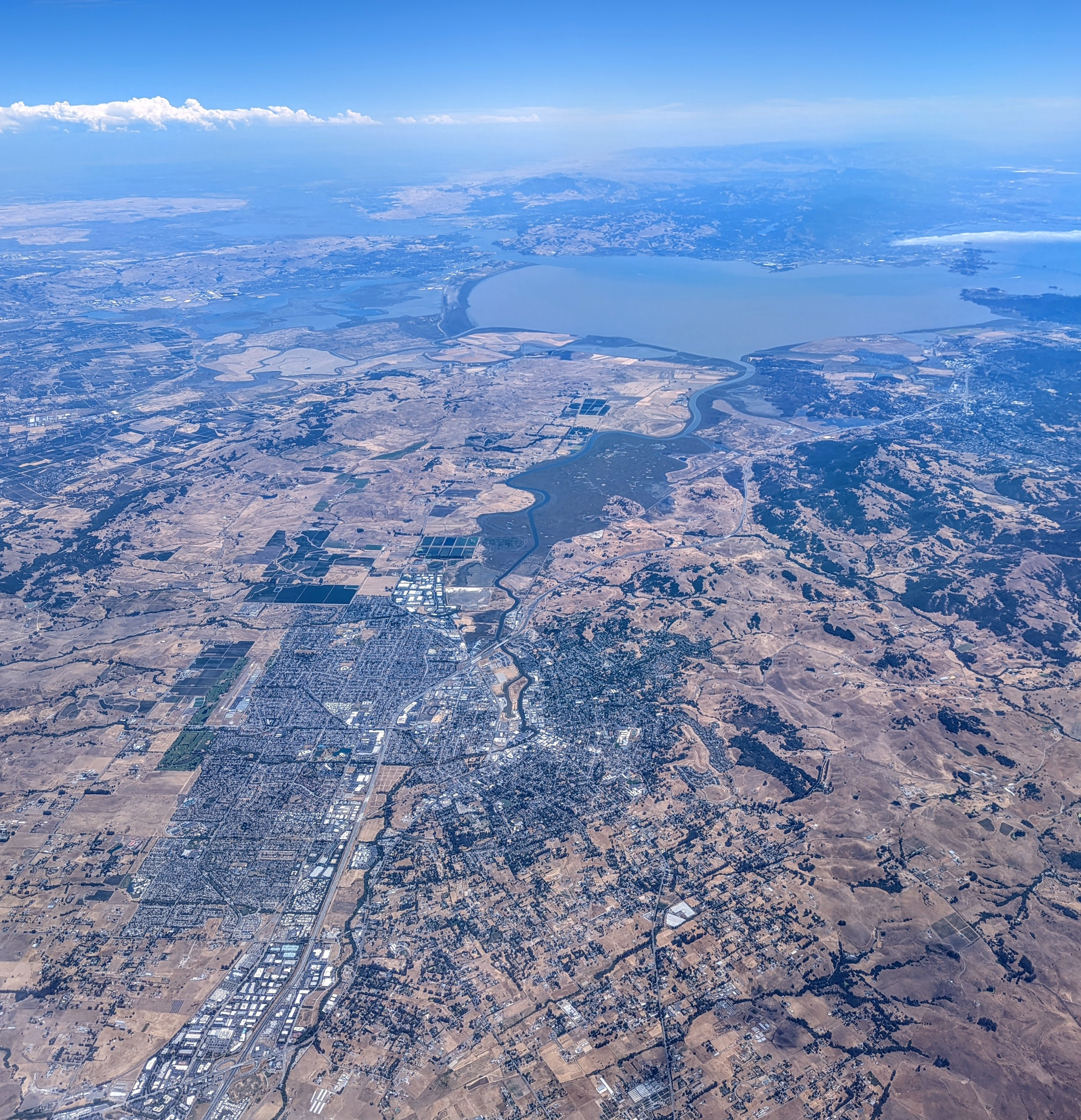
Aerial view of the Petaluma area

Petaluma has a total area of 14.5 sq mi (37.6 km^{2}), of which 14.4 sq mi (37.3 km^{2}) is land and the remaining 0.1 sq mi (0.3 km^{2}) is water. Water comprises 0.74% of the total area.

It is 32 miles (51 km) north of San Francisco.

Petaluma is flanked by the unincorporated communities of Penngrove to the north and Lakeville to the south.

Petaluma is situated at the northernmost navigable end of the Petaluma River, a tidal estuary that snakes southward to San Pablo Bay. Pollution levels in the river, once considerable, have improved in recent years. A significant amount of the city is in the river's flood plain, which overflows its banks every few years, particularly in the Payran neighborhood.

Principal environmental noise sources are U.S. Route 101, Petaluma Boulevard, Washington Street and other major arteries. The number of residents that live in a zone of noise exposure greater than 60 CNEL is approximately 4,000.

=== Climate ===
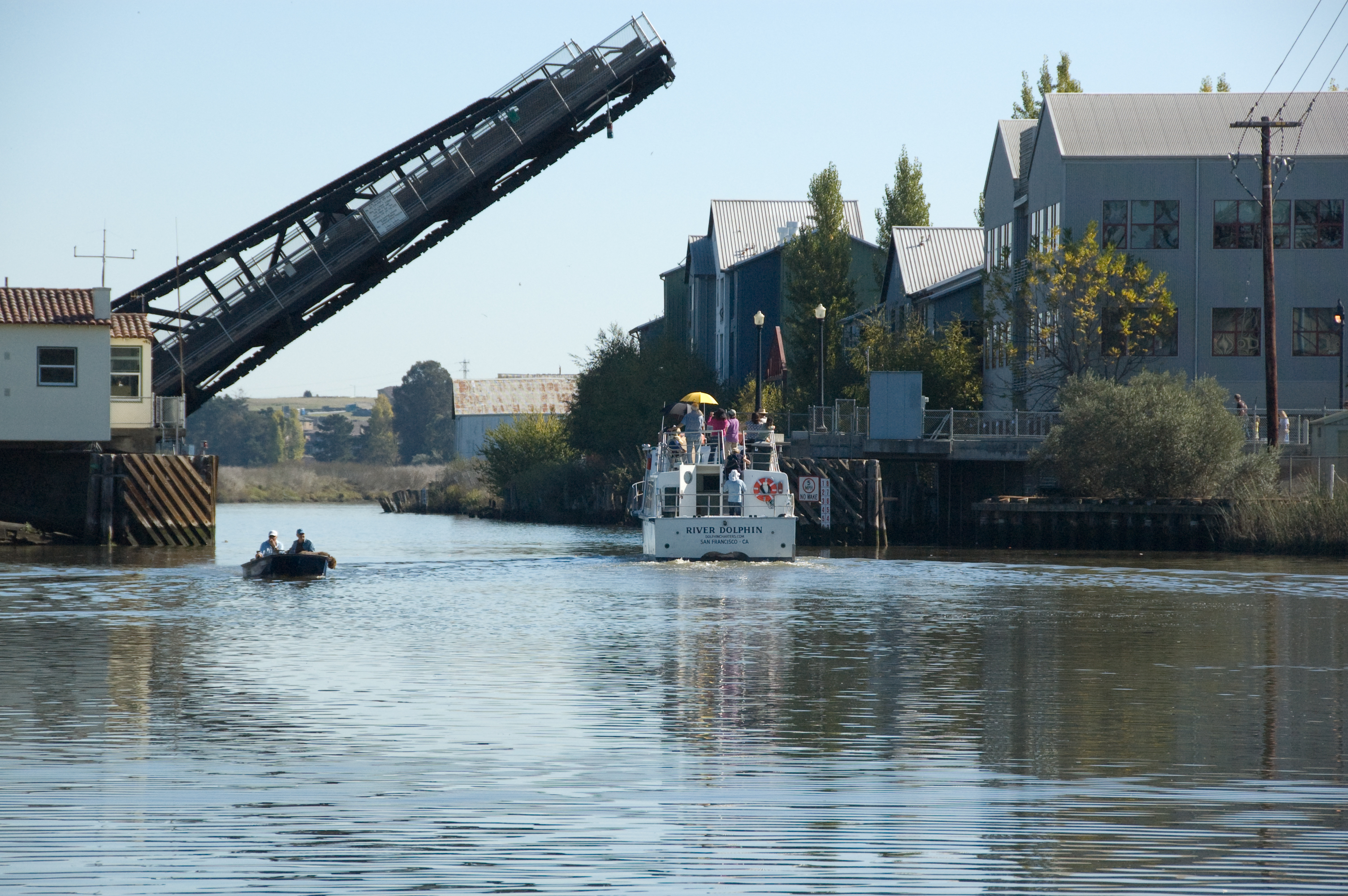
D Street Bridge over Petaluma River

Petaluma has a mild Mediterranean climate (Köppen: Csb). Its dry summer is characterized by typically warm days and cool nights with a large degree of diurnal temperature variation. Summer mornings often start out foggy and chilly, but the fog usually clears by midday or so, giving way to clear skies and warmth for the remainder of the day. August is usually the warmest month, with average daily temperatures ranging from 82 °F (28 °C) to 53 °F (12 °C). December is usually the coldest month, with average daily temperatures ranging from 57 °F (14 °C) to 39 °F (4 °C). Winter is cool and rainy, with frost occasionally occurring on clear nights.

Weather Underground's reporting station in Petaluma had a record high temperature of 111 °F (44 °C) on September 6, 2020. The record low temperature of 16 °F (−9 °C) was recorded on November 14, 1916, and December 14, 1932. The wettest year was 1998 with 45.93 inches (1,167 mm) and the driest year was 1976 with 8.29 inches (211 mm). The wettest month was February 1998 with 19.59 inches (498 mm). The most precipitation in 24 hours was 4.29 inches (109 mm) on December 27, 2004. Although snow is rare in Petaluma, 1.5 inches (38 mm) fell in January 1916, as well as about 3 inches (76 mm) in January 2002.

Climate data for Petaluma, CA (1991–2020 normals, extremes 1913–present)
Month	Jan	Feb	Mar	Apr	May	Jun	Jul	Aug	Sep	Oct	Nov	Dec	Year
Record high °F (°C)	85 (29)	86 (30)	93 (34)	97 (36)	101 (38)	110 (43)	110 (43)	105 (41)	109 (43)	106 (41)	91 (33)	81 (27)	110 (43)
Mean maximum °F (°C)	67.4 (19.7)	72.0 (22.2)	77.2 (25.1)	88.5 (31.4)	87.7 (30.9)	95.6 (35.3)	96.2 (35.7)	96.2 (35.7)	97.1 (36.2)	90.4 (32.4)	77.8 (25.4)	66.8 (19.3)	100.6 (38.1)
Mean daily maximum °F (°C)	57.6 (14.2)	61.3 (16.3)	64.5 (18.1)	67.8 (19.9)	71.9 (22.2)	78.1 (25.6)	80.8 (27.1)	81.2 (27.3)	81.6 (27.6)	76.4 (24.7)	65.5 (18.6)	57.9 (14.4)	70.4 (21.3)
Daily mean °F (°C)	48.3 (9.1)	50.8 (10.4)	53.2 (11.8)	55.8 (13.2)	59.6 (15.3)	64.3 (17.9)	66.6 (19.2)	67.0 (19.4)	66.5 (19.2)	62.0 (16.7)	53.9 (12.2)	48.1 (8.9)	58.0 (14.4)
Mean daily minimum °F (°C)	39.0 (3.9)	40.4 (4.7)	41.9 (5.5)	43.8 (6.6)	47.4 (8.6)	50.4 (10.2)	52.4 (11.3)	52.8 (11.6)	51.4 (10.8)	47.6 (8.7)	42.3 (5.7)	38.4 (3.6)	45.7 (7.6)
Mean minimum °F (°C)	28.1 (−2.2)	30.6 (−0.8)	33.4 (0.8)	35.6 (2.0)	40.6 (4.8)	44.5 (6.9)	47.2 (8.4)	47.6 (8.7)	44.7 (7.1)	39.2 (4.0)	31.4 (−0.3)	27.4 (−2.6)	25.6 (−3.6)
Record low °F (°C)	18 (−8)	18 (−8)	24 (−4)	26 (−3)	27 (−3)	32 (0)	39 (4)	39 (4)	31 (−1)	25 (−4)	20 (−7)	16 (−9)	16 (−9)
Average precipitation inches (mm)	4.77 (121)	5.23 (133)	3.32 (84)	1.68 (43)	0.93 (24)	0.28 (7.1)	0.01 (0.25)	0.05 (1.3)	0.09 (2.3)	1.27 (32)	2.74 (70)	5.19 (132)	25.56 (649)
Average precipitation days (≥ 0.01 in)	12.0	10.4	9.9	6.4	3.7	1.3	0.1	0.3	1.0	3.7	8.0	12.1	68.9

== Demographics ==
Historical population
Census	Pop.	Note	%±
1880	3,326		—
1890	3,692		11.0%
1900	3,871		4.8%
1910	5,880		51.9%
1920	6,226		5.9%
1930	8,245		32.4%
1940	8,034		−2.6%
1950	10,315		28.4%
1960	14,035		36.1%
1970	24,870		77.2%
1980	33,834		36.0%
1990	43,184		27.6%
2000	54,548		26.3%
2010	57,941		6.2%
2020	59,776		3.2%
U.S. Decennial Census; 1860–1870 1880-1890; 1900 1910 1920; 1930 1940 1950; 1960 1970 1980; 1990 2000 2010; 2020

=== Racial and ethnic composition ===
Race and Ethnicity
Racial and ethnic composition	2000	2010	2020
White (non-Hispanic)	76.99%	69.43%	64.47%
Hispanic or Latino (of any race)	14.64%	21.49%	22.76%
Two or more races (non-Hispanic)	2.82%	2.7%	5.58%
Asian (non-Hispanic)	3.83%	4.4%	4.7%
Black or African American (non-Hispanic)	1.07%	1.24%	1.3%
Other (non-Hispanic)	0.18%	0.19%	0.64%
Native American (non-Hispanic)	0.32%	0.34%	0.3%
Pacific Islander (non-Hispanic)	0.16%	0.21%	0.25%

=== 2020 census ===
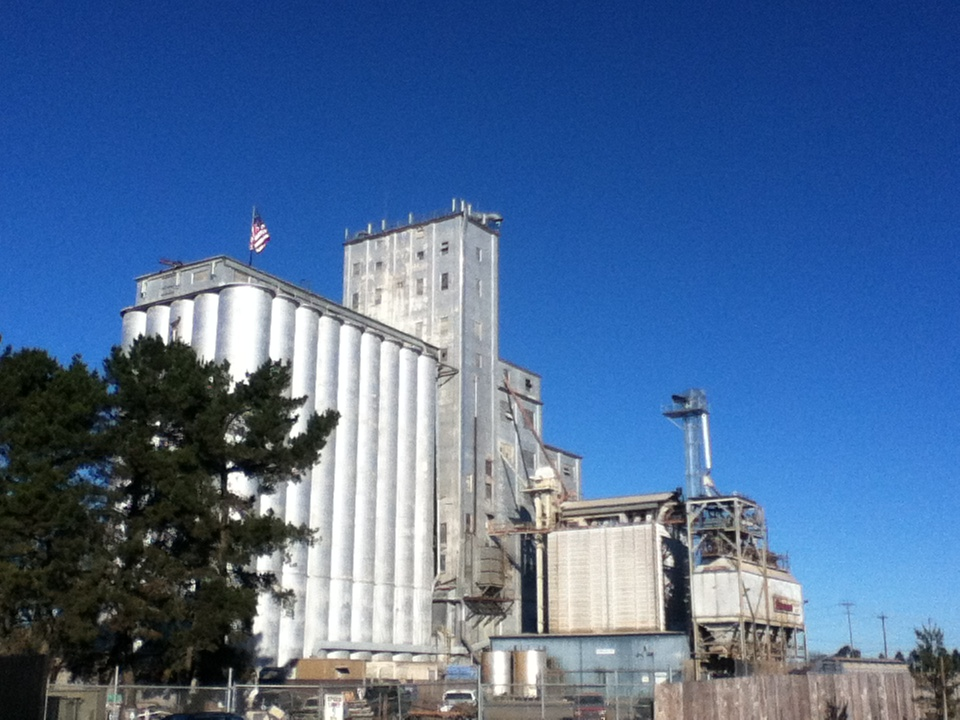
Dairyman's grain mill

As of the 2020 census, Petaluma had a population of 59,776. The median age was 43.4 years. 20.4% of residents were under the age of 18 and 20.0% were 65 years of age or older. For every 100 females there were 93.0 males, and for every 100 females age 18 and over there were 90.7 males age 18 and over.

The population density was 4,146.8 inhabitants per square mile (1,601.1/km^{2}).

100.0% of residents lived in urban areas, while 0.0% lived in rural areas.

There were 23,190 households in Petaluma, of which 30.2% had children under the age of 18 living in them. Of all households, 50.4% were married-couple households, 15.0% were households with a male householder and no spouse or partner present, and 27.6% were households with a female householder and no spouse or partner present. About 25.5% of all households were made up of individuals and 14.3% had someone living alone who was 65 years of age or older.

There were 24,067 housing units, of which 3.6% were vacant. The homeowner vacancy rate was 0.7% and the rental vacancy rate was 4.5%.

=== 2010 census ===
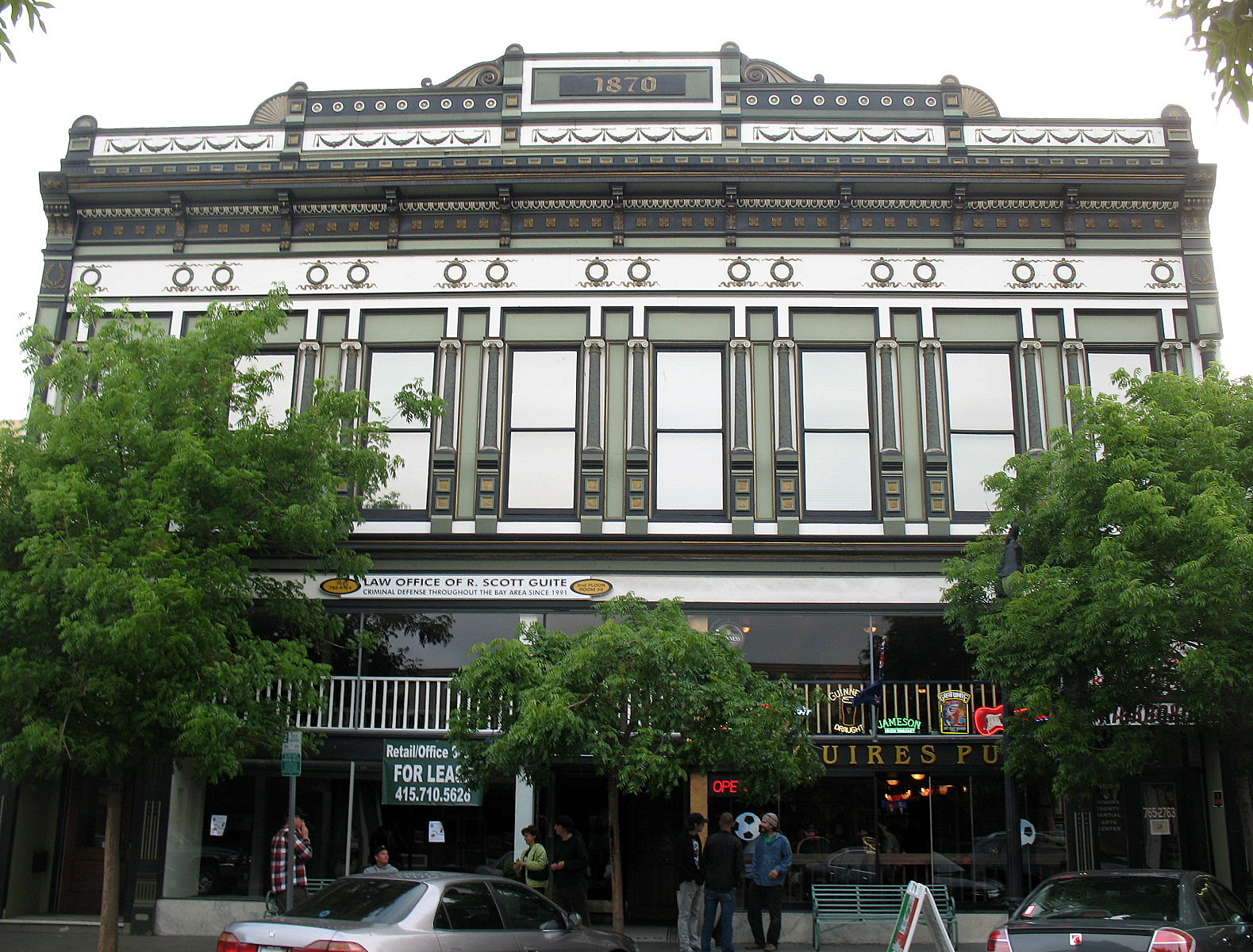
Old Petaluma Opera House

The 2010 United States census reported that Petaluma had a population of 57,941. The population density was 3,998.9 people per square mile (1,544.0/km^{2}). The racial makeup of Petaluma was 46,566 (80.4%) White, 801 (1.4%) African American, 353 (0.6%) Native American, 2,607 (4.5%) Asian (1.3% Chinese, 0.9% Filipino, 0.8% Asian Indian, 0.4% Japanese, 0.3% Vietnamese, 0.2% Korean, 0.1% Pakistani, 0.1% Laotian, 0.1% Thai), 129 (0.2%), Pacific Islander, 5,103 (8.8%) from other races, and 2,382 (4.1%) from two or more races. Hispanic or Latino of any race were 12,453 persons (21.5%). The Latino ethnic groups are Mexicans (16.2%), Salvadorans (1.2%), Guatemalans (0.6%), Nicaraguans (0.3%), Peruvians (0.3%), and Puerto Ricans (0.3%).

The census reported that 57,217 people (98.8% of the population) lived in households, 361 (0.6%) lived in non-institutionalized group quarters, and 363 (0.6%) were institutionalized.

There were 21,737 households, out of which 7,541 (34.7%) had children under the age of 18 living in them, 11,392 (52.4%) were opposite-sex married couples living together, 2,257 (10.4%) had a female householder with no husband present, 1,052 (4.8%) had a male householder with no wife present. There were 1,319 (6.1%) unmarried opposite-sex partnerships, and 207 (1.0%) same-sex married couples or partnerships. 5,372 households (24.7%) were made up of individuals, and 2,366 (10.9%) had someone living alone who was 65 years of age or older. The average household size was 2.63. There were 14,701 families (67.6% of all households); the average family size was 3.14.

The population was spread out, with 13,455 people (23.2%) under the age of 18, 4,589 people (7.9%) aged 18 to 24, 15,041 people (26.0%) aged 25 to 44, 17,273 people (29.8%) aged 45 to 64, and 7,583 people (13.1%) who were 65 years of age or older. The median age was 40.3 years. For every 100 females, there were 96.3 males. For every 100 females age 18 and over, there were 93.8 males.

There were 22,736 housing units at an average density of 1,569.2 per square mile (605.9/km^{2}), of which 14,159 (65.1%) were owner-occupied, and 7,578 (34.9%) were occupied by renters. The homeowner vacancy rate was 1.3%; the rental vacancy rate was 4.8%. 37,389 people (64.5% of the population) lived in owner-occupied housing units and 19,828 people (34.2%) lived in rental housing units.

=== 2000 census ===
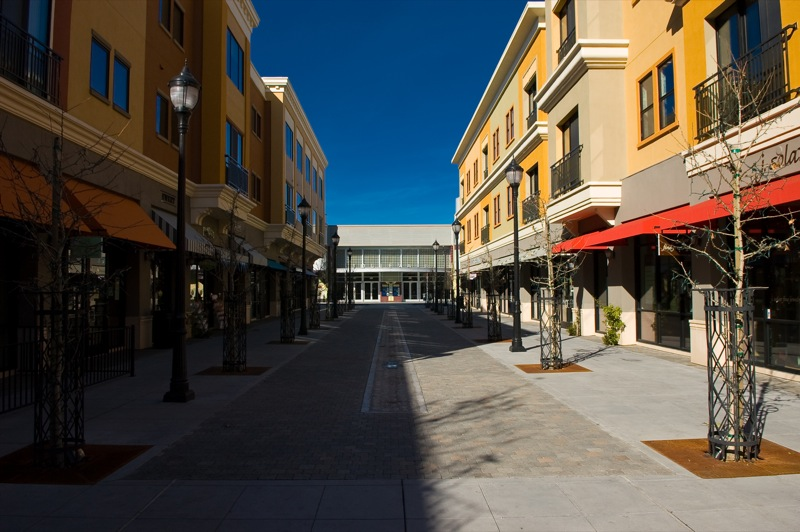
Theater district

As of the census of 2000, there were 54,548 people, 19,932 households, and 14,012 families residing in the city. The population density was 3,953 people per square mile (1,526/km^{2}). There were 20,304 housing units at an average density of 1,471/sq mi (568/km^{2}). The racial makeup of the city was 84.16% White, 1.16% African American, 0.54% Native American, 3.91% Asian, 0.17% Pacific Islander, 6.08% from other races, and 3.98% from two or more races. 14.64% of the population were Hispanic.

There were 19,932 households, out of which 36.6% had children under the age of 18 living with them, 55.3% were married couples living together, 10.6% had a female householder with no husband present, and 29.7% were non-families. 22.6% of all households were made up of individuals, and 9.1% had someone living alone who was 65 years of age or older. The average household size was 2.70 and the average family size was 3.16. The age distribution is: 26.2% under the age of 18, 7.2% from 18 to 24, 31.5% from 25 to 44, 24.1% from 45 to 64, and 11.0% who were 65 years of age or older. The median age was 37 years. For every 100 females, there were 95.6 males. For every 100 females age 18 and over, there were 91.9 males.

The median income for a household in the city was $61,679, and the median income for a family was $71,158 (these figures had risen to $68,949 and $85,513, respectively, as of a 2007 estimate). Males had a median income of $50,232 versus $36,413 for females. The per capita income for the city was $27,087. About 3.3% of families and 6.0% of the population were below the poverty line, including 6.2% of those under age 18 and 7.1% of those age 65 or over.

== Economy ==
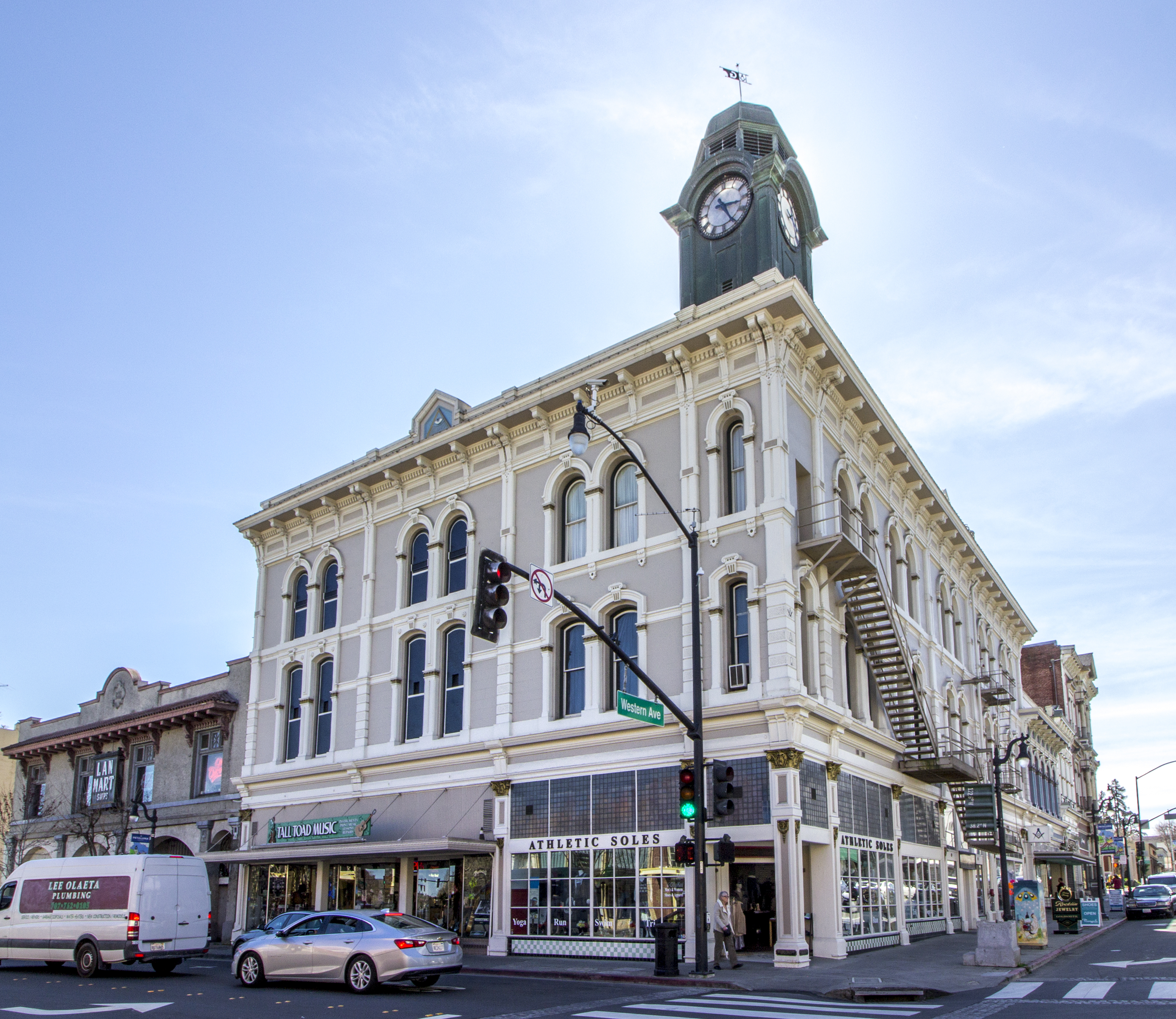
Downtown Petaluma

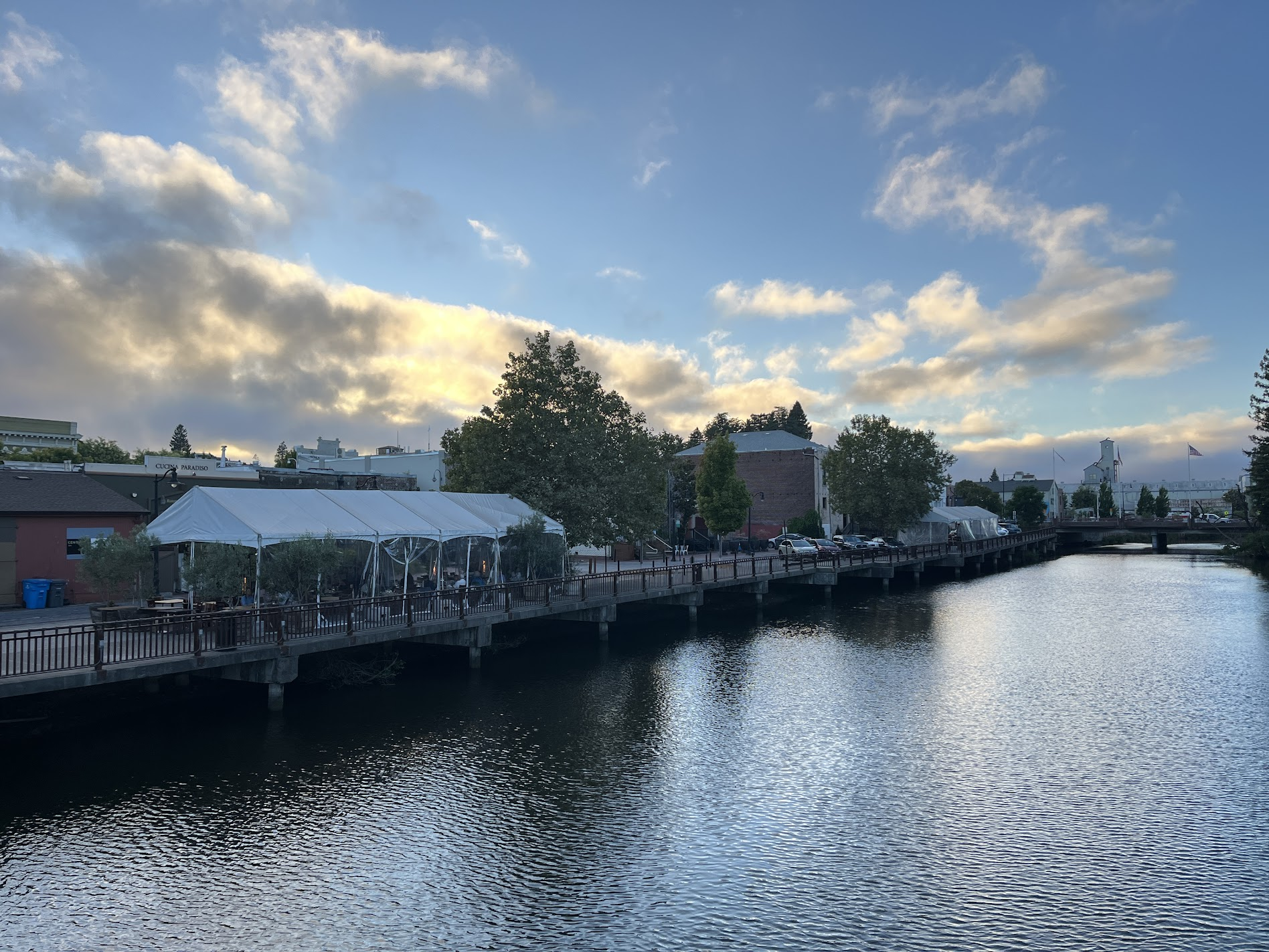
Waterfront

Amy's Kitchen, Calix Inc., Clover Sonoma, Lagunitas Brewing Company, and Petaluma Poultry are based in Petaluma. Mesa/Boogie and Enphase Energy were also founded in Petaluma.

=== Top employers ===
According to the city's 2023 Annual Comprehensive Financial Report, the top employers in the city are:

#	Employer	# of Employees	% of Total City Employment
1	Petaluma School District	772	2.44%
2	Petaluma Poultry Processors	419	1.33%
3	Petaluma Valley Hospital	364	1.15%
4	City of Petaluma	356	1.13%
5	Labcon, North America	280	0.89%
6	Old Adobe Union School District	273	0.86%
7	Lagunitas Brewing Company	235	0.74%
8	Clover Sonoma	201	0.64%
9	Hansel Auto	177	0.56%
10	Petaluma Post-Acute Rehab	161	0.51%

=== Military ===
==== U.S. Coast Guard ====
The U.S. Coast Guard operates Training Center Petaluma just outside Petaluma, near Two Rock. It operates several of its class "A" and "C" schools at TRACEN Petaluma, including the Electronics Technician (ET), Culinary Specialist (CS), Health Service Technician (HS), Information Systems Technician (IT), Operation Specialist (OS), Storekeeper (SK), and Yeoman (YN) schools.

The Coast Guard also operates the Chief Petty Officer Academy at TRACEN, which trains senior non-commissioned officers (Chief Petty Officers) for both the U.S. Coast Guard and the U.S. Air Force.

==== California National Guard ====
The California National Guard operates an armed forces facility in Petaluma.

== Arts and culture ==
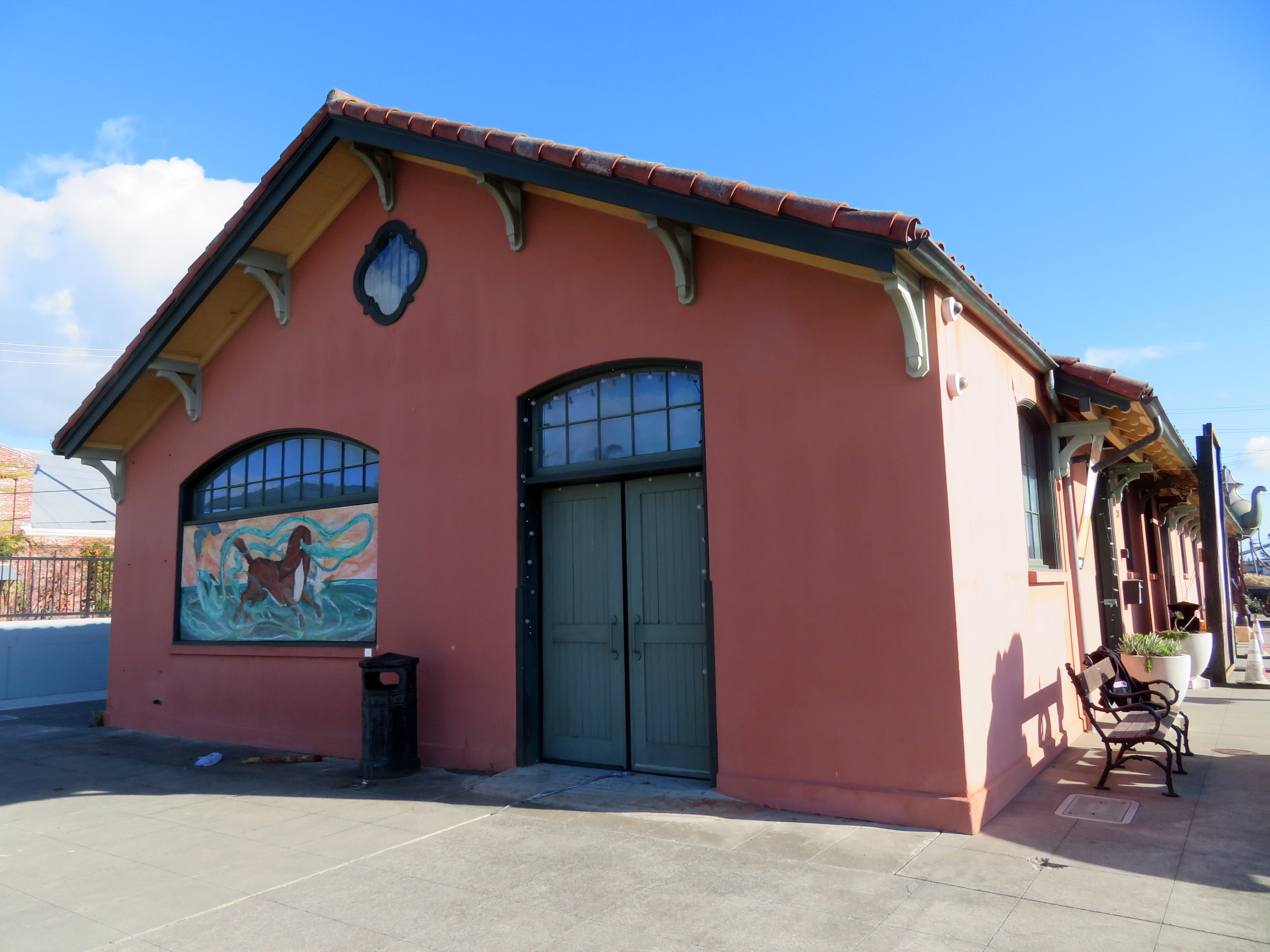
Petaluma Arts Center

The Petaluma Arts Center is located here.

The annual Butter and Eggs Day Festival is a celebration of Petaluma's culture and heritage. It includes a parade surrounded by a festival with contains food, crafts, live music, two large kids areas, and beverage gardens. The Cinnabar Theater is a professional non-profit theater, and is also home to the Young Repertory Theater.

== Parks and recreation ==
Immediately to the southwest is Helen Putnam Regional Park, accessible from Chileno Valley Road. This park of 216 acres (0.9 km^{2}) has trails for hiking, cycling and horseback riding and is one of two parks named in honor of former mayor Helen Putnam who served from 1965 to 1979; the other is Putnam Plaza on Petaluma Boulevard. Lying above the city of Petaluma on the northwest flank of Sonoma Mountain is the Fairfield Osborn Preserve, a nature reserve with a diversity of native plants and animals. Nearby to the southeast is Tolay Lake, the site of prehistoric seasonal settlement by Miwok and Pomo tribes.

== Government ==
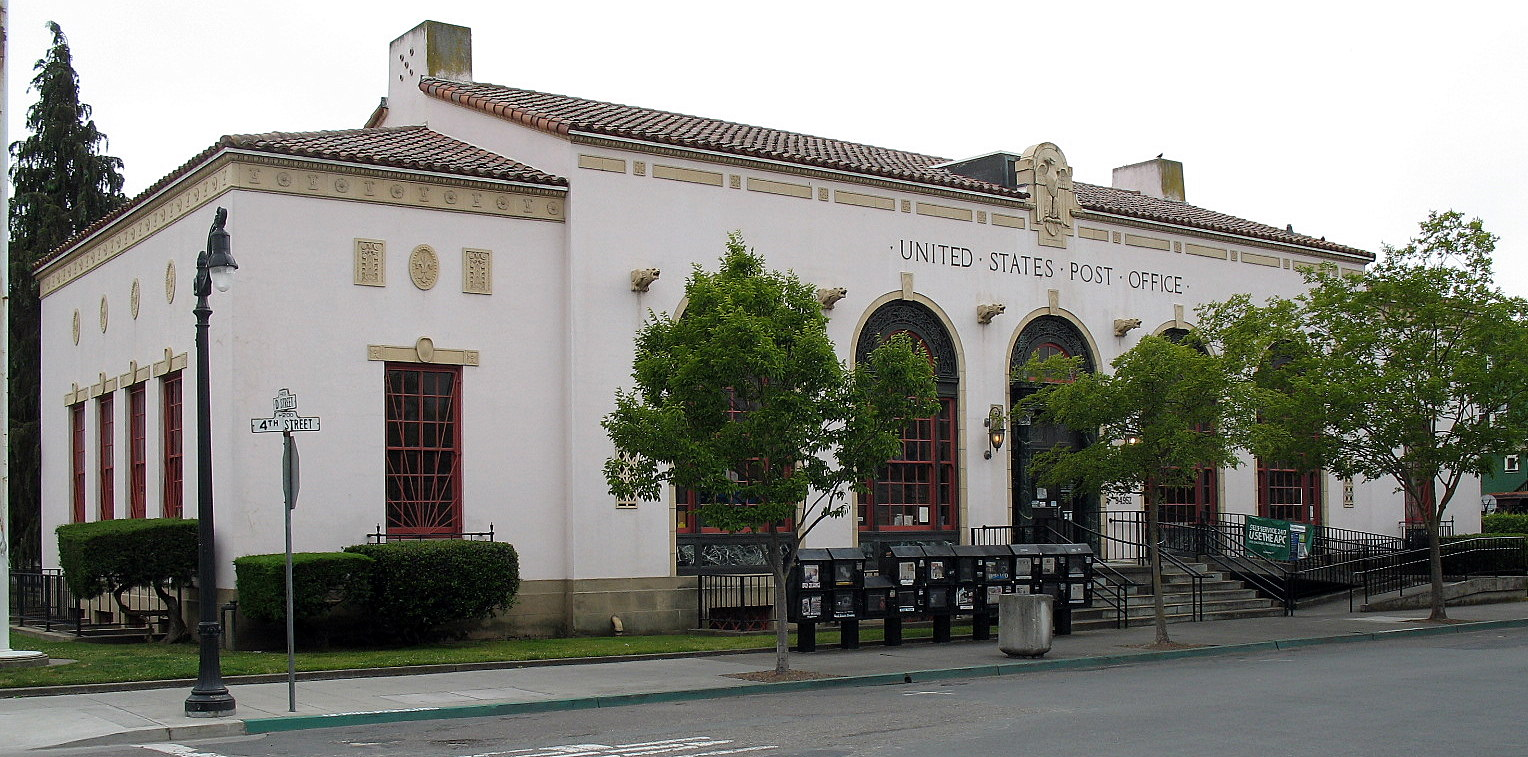
Petaluma Post Office, built in the Spanish Colonial Revival style in 1933

The mayor of Petaluma is Kevin McDonnell.

=== State and federal representation ===
In the California State Legislature, Petaluma is in the 2nd senatorial district, represented by Democrat Mike McGuire, and the 12th Assembly district, represented by Democrat Damon Connolly.

In the United States House of Representatives, Petaluma is in California's 2nd congressional district, represented by Democrat Jared Huffman.

According to the California Secretary of State, as of February 10, 2019, Petaluma has 36,034 registered voters. Of those, 18,779 (52.1%) are registered Democrats, 6,124 (17%) are registered Republicans, and 9,281 (25.8%) have declined to state a political party.

== Education ==
Petaluma is covered by multiple elementary school districts, while all of Petaluma is in the Petaluma Joint Union High School District. Petaluma City School District is made up of both the Petaluma City Elementary School District and the Petaluma Joint Union High School District. Other elementary school districts covering parts of Petaluma include Old Adobe Union,, Wilmar Union,, Cinnabar,, and Waugh..

There are two comprehensive high schools in Petaluma: Petaluma High School and Casa Grande High School, whose athletic teams are known as the Trojans and Gauchos respectively. Casa Grande High School has a notable Academic Decathlon team, which has represented Sonoma County for the last 27 years in the state-level competition. There is an annual football game between the two schools' teams known as the "Egg Bowl". The Game was suspended in 2011 for fights involving players and fans, but was brought back in 2017, with Petaluma winning the game over Casa Grande, 20–14. The two Petaluma public middle schools are Kenilworth Junior High School and Petaluma Junior High School.

St. Vincent de Paul High School, a Roman Catholic private school, is in Petaluma, and its athletic teams are known as the Mustangs. Santa Rosa Junior College has a second campus in Petaluma, and the campus the unaccredited art school/atelier l'Atelier aux Couleurs is located in Petaluma. Harvest Christian School is a private Christian school in Petaluma, serving grades TK–8.

== Infrastructure ==
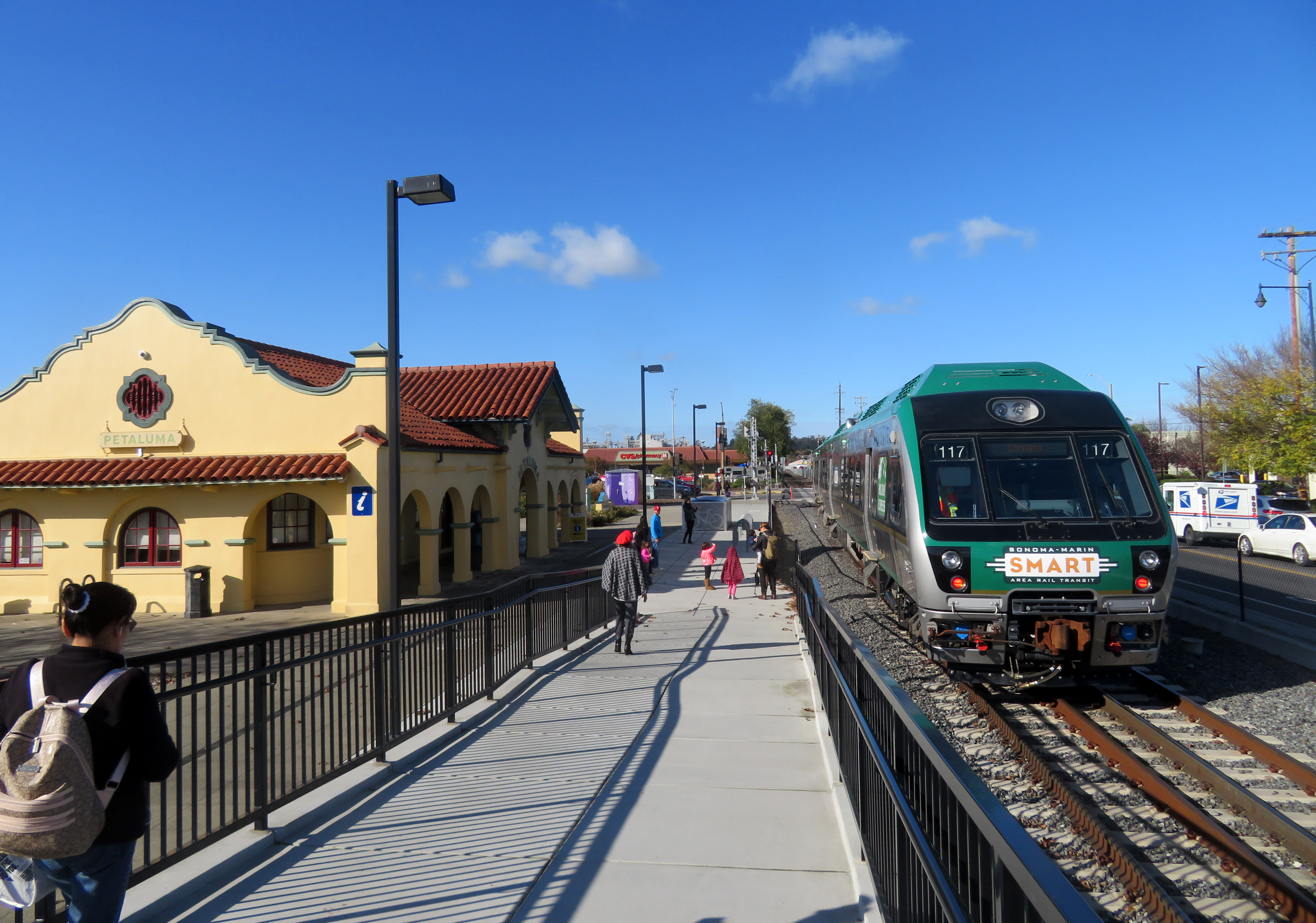
Mission Revival–style Petaluma Downtown station, served by Sonoma–Marin Area Rail Transit.

=== Transportation ===
U.S. Highway 101 is the main freeway for the city. State Route 116 also runs through town as Lakeville Highway. Other major streets include East Washington Street, North and South McDowell Boulevards, and Petaluma Boulevard.

Petaluma is served by Petaluma Transit, Golden Gate Transit and by Sonoma County Transit bus services. The Sonoma–Marin Area Rail Transit (SMART) rail line inaugurated service in August 2017 and serves Petaluma–Downtown station, adjacent to the historic Northwestern Pacific Railroad depot near Washington Street. A second station, Petaluma North, opened in 2025.

The Amtrak Thruway 7 bus provides daily connections to/from Petaluma (with a stop at 19 Copeland Street), Martinez to the south, and Arcata to the north. Additional Amtrak connections are available from Martinez station.

The nearest major airports are San Francisco International Airport and Oakland International Airport, Sonoma County Airport Express buses connect Petaluma with the aforementioned airports. General aviation is served by the Petaluma Municipal Airport, as well as the Charles M. Schulz – Sonoma County Airport located north of Santa Rosa.

== Notable people ==
=== Actors and filmmakers ===
- Lloyd Bridges (1913–1998), actor; graduated from Petaluma High School in 1930
- Myron Healey (1923–2005), actor
- Kane Parsons (born 2005), YouTuber and film director
- Winona Ryder (born 1971), actor; graduated from Petaluma High School in 1989
- Brett Johnson (born 1982), television writer, producer and showrunner. Graduated from Petaluma High School in 2001.

=== Artists and designers ===
- David Best (born 1945), sculptor, lives and works in Petaluma, known for Burning Man creations
- Rosa Estebanez (1927–1991), Cuban-born American sculptor, lived and worked in Petaluma
- Mark di Suvero (born 1933), sculptor, lived and worked in Petaluma, 1975-
- Mary Fuller McChesney (1922–2022), sculptor, lived on Sonoma Mountain, 1953–2019
- Robert P. McChesney (1913–2008), painter, lived on Sonoma Mountain, 1953–2008
- Richard Wagener (born 1944), engraver, printer, book designer, publisher of Fine press books, Mixolydian Editions
- Newton J. Tharp (1867–1909), architect, painter

=== Businesspeople ===
- Kevin Tsujihara (born 1964), former chairman and CEO of Warner Bros.

=== Historical figures ===
- Richard A. Penry (1948–1994), soldier and Medal of Honor recipient

=== Musicians and bands ===
- Sean Hayes (born 1969), singer and songwriter
- Em Rossi (born 1998), singer and songwriter

=== Sports figures ===
- Josh Akognon (born 1986), basketball player
- Clayton Andrews (born 1997), baseball player
- Anthony Bender (born 1995), baseball player
- Bruce Bochte (born 1950), baseball player
- Justin Bruihl (born 1997), baseball player
- Kevin Buckler (born 1959), race car driver & founder of The Racers Group
- Steven Cozza (born 1985), professional road bicycle racer
- Kristi DeVert (born 1973) soccer player
- Joe Enochs (born 1971), former soccer player who most notably played for VfL Osnabrück
- Jonny Gomes (born 1980), baseball player
- Luke Haggard (born 2000), football player
- Garrett Hill (born 1996), baseball player
- Duke Iversen (1920–2011), football player
- Elijah Qualls (born 1995), football player
- Tom Louderback (born 1933), football player
- Tiffany Roberts (born 1977) soccer player and coach
- Brady Scott (born 1999) soccer player
- Minna Stess (born 2006), Olympic skateboarder
- Spencer Torkelson (born 1999), baseball player

=== Video game industry ===
- Ryan Davis (1979–2013), video game journalist, former GameSpot writer and co-founder of Giant Bomb
- Jeff Gerstmann (born 1975), video game journalist, former GameSpot writer and co-founder of Giant Bomb
- Jake Rodkin, video game designer, graphic designer, podcaster
- Bill Tiller (born 1967), computer game designer, writer, and artist, known for his work at LucasArts

=== Writers ===
- Shirley Neilsen Blum (born 1932), American art historian, author, gallerist, curator, and professor; born in Petaluma.
- Tobias Capwell (born c. 1973), American curator, military historian and jouster; born in Petaluma
- Pauline Kael (1919–2001), movie critic
- Karen Kilgariff (born 1970), comedian, podcaster and writer
- Bill Pronzini (born 1943), mystery writer
- Silver Tree, film writer and producer

=== Others ===
- Alex Consani (born 2003), model; first transgender person to be named Model of the Year at the annual Fashion Awards in London.
- Wayne Adam Ford (born 1961), serial killer; born in Petaluma
- Henry Laporte, American chef and content creator
- Nicole Aunapu Mann (born 1977), USMC fighter pilot and NASA astronaut.

== In popular culture ==
- The 2016 film American Wrestler: The Wizard is set in Petaluma.
- The 2007 Michael Ondaatje novel Divisadero is partly set on a farm situated near Petaluma.
- In their song "The Days of the Phoenix" from their September 2000 album titled The Art of Drowning, the punk rock band AFI makes reference to the Phoenix Theater on Washington Street in downtown Petaluma, a venue the band used to play on a regular basis.
- In M*A*S*H, season 6, episode 24 ("Major Topper" – first aired March 27, 1978), a fictitious Petaluma Lumberjack Festival is referenced.
- Much of the 1973 movie American Graffiti directed by George Lucas and produced by Francis Ford Coppola was filmed in Petaluma.
- Norman Greenbaum's 1972 album Petaluma is named in honor of the city, which was home to his dairy farm at the time.

== See also ==
- List of cities and towns in California
- List of cities and towns in the San Francisco Bay Area
- Petaluma Baseball Team
- Petaluma Gap
- Petaluma Reservoir
- Petaluma Wildlife Museum
