= List of cemeteries in Sonoma County, California =

This list of cemeteries in Sonoma County, California includes currently operating, historical (closed for new interments), and defunct (graves abandoned or removed) cemeteries, columbaria, and mausolea in Sonoma County, California. It does not include pet cemeteries. Selected interments are given for notable people.

Number	Name	City	Image	Type	Notes	Location	References
1	Annapolis Church Cemetery	Annapolis			Also known as Horicon Cemetery and Mt. Carmel Cemetery.	38°43′06″N 123°21′37″W	
2	B'nai Israel Cemetery	Petaluma				38°14′44″N 122°38′57″W	
3	Beeson Cemetery	Geyserville		traditional	Also known as Alexander Valley Cemetery.	38°40′52″N 122°50′00″W	
4	Benitz Ranch Cemetery	Jenner				38°31′49″N 123°16′09″W	
5	Bennett Valley Cemetery	Santa Rosa			Sonoma County Historic Landmarks and Districts #39	38°24′57″N 122°39′41″W	
6	Beth Ami Cemetery	Santa Rosa			Home of the Eternal Peace Interfaith Cemetery. Part of Santa Rosa Memorial Park.	38°27′28″N 122°42′25″W	
7	Bloomfield Cemetery	Bloomfield			Sonoma County Historic Landmarks and Districts #151	38°18′49″N 122°51′32″W	
8	Bodega Bay Cemetery	Bodega Bay				38°19′03″N 123°01′32″W	
9	Bodega Calvary Cemetery	Bodega				38°20′31″N 122°58′32″W	
10	Bridgehaven Cemetery					38°26′02″N 123°06′28″W	
11	Buckeye Creek Cemetery	Annapolis				38°43′53″N 123°25′50″W	
12	Calvary Catholic Cemetery	Santa Rosa		traditional + colombarium		38°25′52″N 122°41′09″W	
13	Canfield Cemetery	Sebastopol				38°21′05″N 122°48′55″W	
14	Chapel of the Chimes	Santa Rosa				38°24′50″N 122°42′50″W	
15	Cloverdale Cemetery	Cloverdale				38°48′32″N 123°00′36″W	
16	Cooper Cemetery	Stewarts Point				38°36′46″N 123°16′36″W	
17	Sonoma County, California Cemetery	Santa Rosa		graveyard	Entrance is located within the Santa Rosa Rural Cemetery. Enter McDonald Gate, stay to your right till it slopes down to a flat area. Was part of Stanley Cemetery, adjacent to Santa Rosa Rural Cemetery.	38°27′19″N 122°42′10″W	
18	Cypress Hill Memorial Park	Petaluma				38°14′50″N 122°39′06″W	
19	Cyrus Alexander Family Cemetery	Healdsburg				38°39′25″N 122°47′11″W	
20	Druids Occidental Cemetery	Occidental				38°24′36″N 122°56′32″W	
21	Duncans Mills Cemetery	Duncans Mills				38°27′33″N 123°03′18″W	
22	Eldridge Cemetery					38°20′38″N 122°31′13″W	
23	Evergreen Cemetery	Kellogg				38°38′10″N 122°40′49″W	
24	Faught Cemetery	Santa Rosa				38°31′07″N 122°45′27″W	
25	Forestview Cemetery	Forestville				38°28′06″N 122°53′00″W	
26	Fort Ross State Historic Park Cemetery	Jenner				38°30′53″N 123°14′24″W	
27	Fulton Cemetery	Fulton				38°29′20″N 122°46′43″W	
28	Gilliam Cemetery	Sebastopol			Sometimes identified as in Graton.	38°25′53″N 122°52′52″W	
29	Green Valley Cemetery	Sebastopol			Sometimes identified as in Green Valley. Originally associated with the Green Valley Methodist Church.	38°26′32″N 122°53′11″W	
30	Hall Cemetery	Healdsburg				38°39′40″N 122°51′36″W	
31	Jack London State Historic Park Cemetery	Glen Ellen				38°21′14″N 122°32′12″W	
32	Jess Stonestreet Jackson Jr. Cemetery	Healdsburg			Private cemetery located north of Stonestreet Winery	38.715427°N 122.800582°W Flagpole visible in March 2015 imagery.	
33	Liberty Cemetery	Petaluma			Sonoma County landmarks #160	38°16′43″N 122°42′18″W	
34	Long Ranch Family Cemetery	Healdsburg				38°40′21″N 122°52′54″W	
35	Luther Burbank Memorial Home and Gardens Cemetery	Santa Rosa				38°26′08″N 122°42′42″W	
36	Macedonia Cemetery	Sebastopol				38°21′34″N 122°46′22″W	
37	McPeak Cemetery	Hacienda		traditional		38°30′35″N 122°55′41″W	
38	Mission San Francisco Solano Cemetery	Sonoma				38°17′42″N 122°27′20″W	
39	Oak Mound Cemetery	Healdsburg				38°36′59″N 122°51′32″W	
40	Old County Cemetery	Santa Rosa			Also known as Chanate Historic Cemetery	38°28′01″N 122°42′30″W	
41	Olive Hill Cemetery	Healdsburg				38°42′30″N 122°55′27″W	
42	Pleasant Hills Memorial Park	Sebastopol				38°22′47″N 122°50′07″W	
43	Pythian Home Cemetery	Kenwood				38°26′36″N 122°34′50″W	
44	Redwood Memorial Gardens	Guerneville				38°30′29″N 122°59′32″W	
45	Riverside Cemetery	Cloverdale					
46	Rouff–Thomas Cemetery	Jenner				38°32′26″N 123°17′10″W	
47	Saint Catherine's Church Cemetery	Monte Rio				38°28′09″N 123°00′38″W	
48	Saint Francis Solano Catholic Cemetery	Sonoma				38°17′28″N 122°26′46″W	
49	Santa Rosa Memorial Park Cemetery	Santa Rosa		lawn + mausoleums		38°27′35″N 122°42′21″W	
50	Santa Rosa Odd Fellows Cemetery	Santa Rosa		traditional	Now managed by Santa Rosa Memorial Park.	38°27′25″N 122°42′22″W	
51	Santa Rosa Rural Cemetery	Santa Rosa		rural	Santa Rosa Rural Cemetery has two entrances: the McDonald Entrance (main entrance) and the Franklin Gate Entrance. The Fulkerson Cemetery and Moke Cemetery are within.	38°27′20″N 122°42′17″W	
52	Seaview Cemetery	Seaview				38°32′36″N 123°13′27″W	
53	Sebastopol Memorial Lawn Cemetery	Sebastopol		lawn + traditional		38°23′51″N 122°50′13″W	
54	Sharp Creek Cemetery	Santa Rosa			Also known as Oak Knoll Cemetery and Sharp Cemetery	38°33′02″N 122°40′17″W	
55	Shiloh Cemetery	Windsor				38°31′32″N 122°48′55″W	
56	Sonoma Mountain Cemetery	Sonoma			Notable burial: Mariano Guadalupe Vallejo	38°18′00″N 122°27′22″W	
57	Sonoma State Home Cemetery	Eldridge			Sonoma County Historic Landmarks and Districts #38	38°20′50″N 122°31′07″W	
58	Spring Hill Cemetery	Sebastopol				38°23′49″N 122°51′51″W	
59	Stanley Cemetery	Santa Rosa				38°27′21″N 122°42′18″W	
60	Steele Family Cemetery	Santa Rosa				38°27′08″N 122°48′24″W	
61	Stewarts Point Cemetery	Stewarts Point				38°39′00″N 123°23′47″W	
62	Sugarloaf Cemetery	Annapolis				38°39′14″N 123°15′53″W	
63	Two Rock Presbyterian Church Cemetery	Two Rock			Sonoma County Historic Landmarks and Districts #158. Also known as the Presbyterian Church Cemetery.	38°15′24″N 122°46′47″W	
64	Valley Cemetery	Sonoma				38°17′00″N 122°27′02″W	
65	Veterans Memorial Park Cemetery	Sonoma				38°17′57″N 122°27′24″W	

== See also ==
- List of cemeteries in California
