= Stewarts Point =

Stewarts Point may refer to the following places in the United States:

- Stewarts Point, California
- Stewarts Point, Nevada

== See also ==
- Stewarts Point State Marine Reserve & Stewarts Point State Marine Conservation Area in Sonoma County, California
- Kashia Band of Pomo Indians of the Stewarts Point Rancheria in Sonoma County, California
