= Chapel of the Chimes (Oakland, California) =

Crematory and columbarium in Oakland, California, United States

Coordinates: 37.83189°N 122.24569°W

Designations

Oakland Designated Landmark
- Designated: 1999
- Reference no.: 129

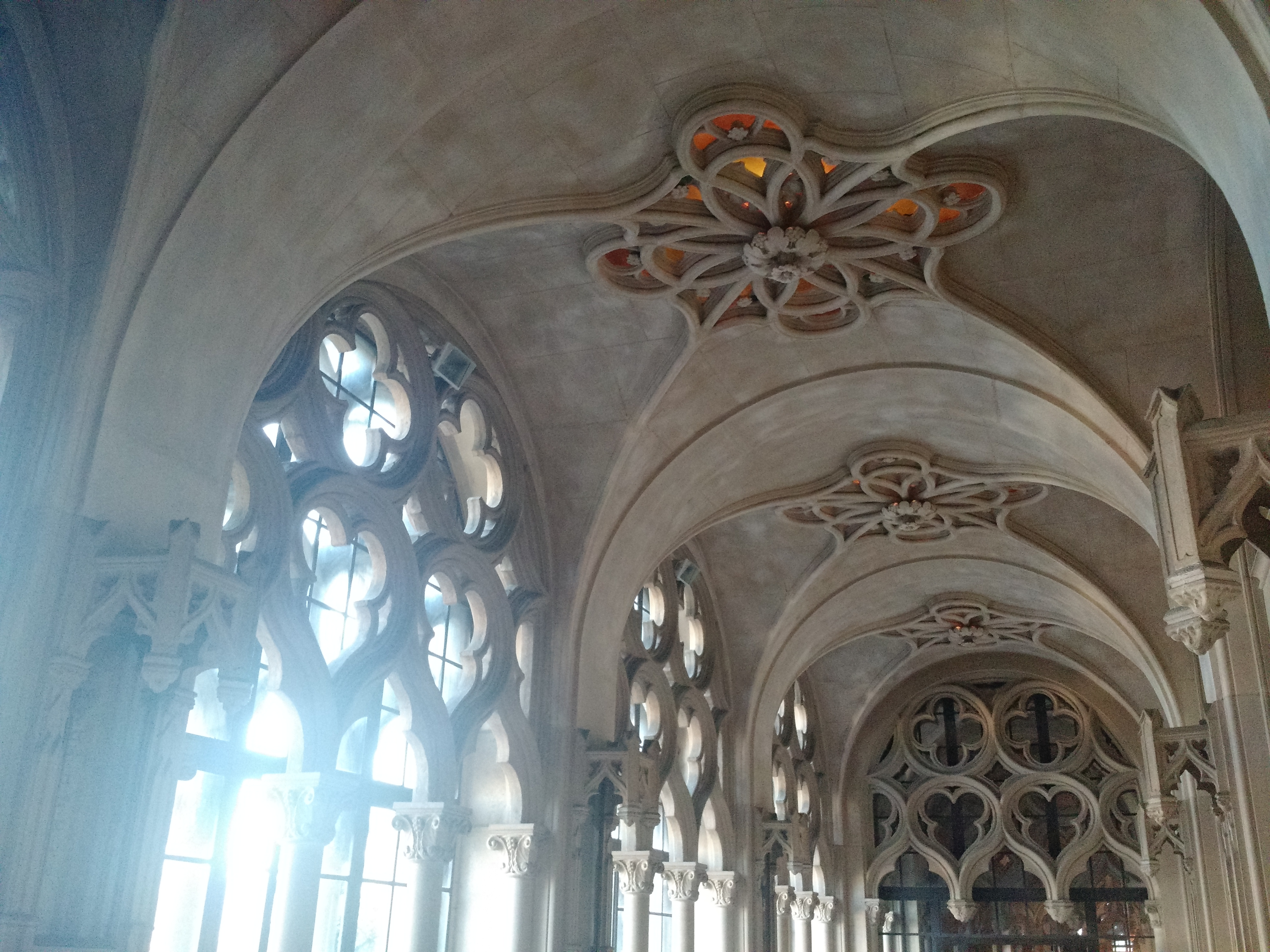
Interior of the chapel

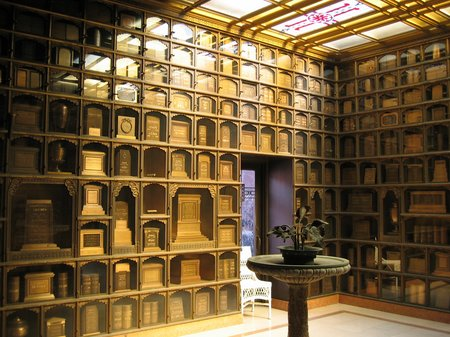
Interior of the columbarium, with book-shaped cinerary urns

Chapel of the Chimes was founded as California Electric Crematory in 1909 as a crematory and columbarium at 4499 Piedmont Avenue, at the entrance of Mountain View Cemetery in Oakland, California. The present building dates largely from a 1928 redevelopment based on the designs of the architect Julia Morgan. The Spanish Gothic architecture features Moorish motifs and the interior is a maze of small rooms featuring ornate stonework, statues, gardens, fountains, and mosaics.

== History ==
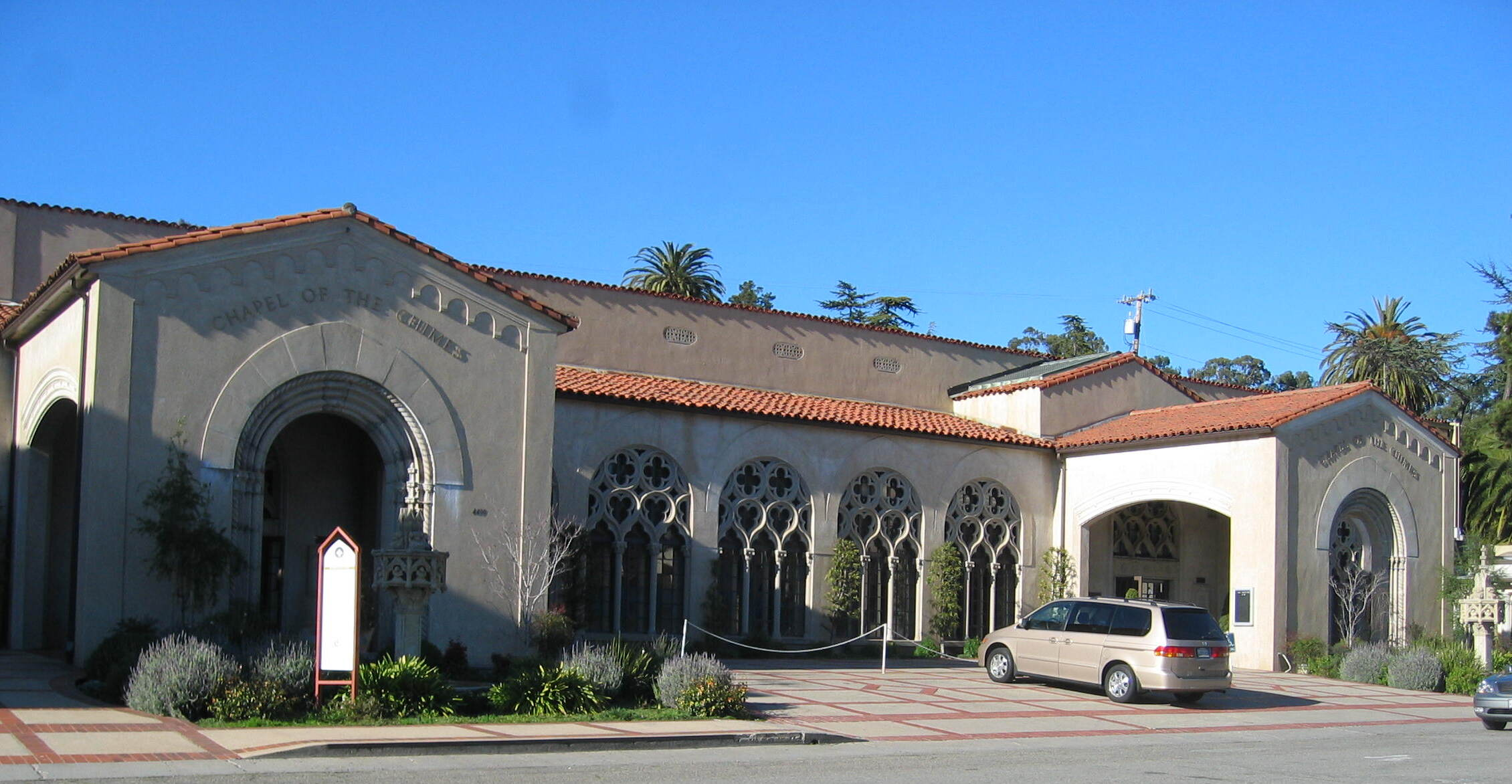
Exterior of the chapel

The chapel originates with a crematory built in 1909 by the California Crematorium Association on the site of a trolley car station; the old structure still has train schedules on the wall. Architect Julia Morgan was hired to expand the facility; the new crematory and columbarium were dedicated on Memorial Day 1928, named Chapel of the Chimes for the chimes in the tower. Architect Aaron Green, a protégé of Frank Lloyd Wright, subsequently contributed six additions over 24 years, including mausoleums.

The building maintains its original functions and also serves as the venue for annual music festivals on the winter and summer solstices.

The chapel's owners operate funeral homes and cemeteries, not designed by Morgan, in Hayward, also under the name Chapel of the Chimes, as well as Sunset Lawn Chapel of the Chimes in Sacramento.

Chapel of the Chimes holds the records of the Chapel of Memories on Pleasant Valley Avenue.

== Garden of Memory ==
Garden of Memory
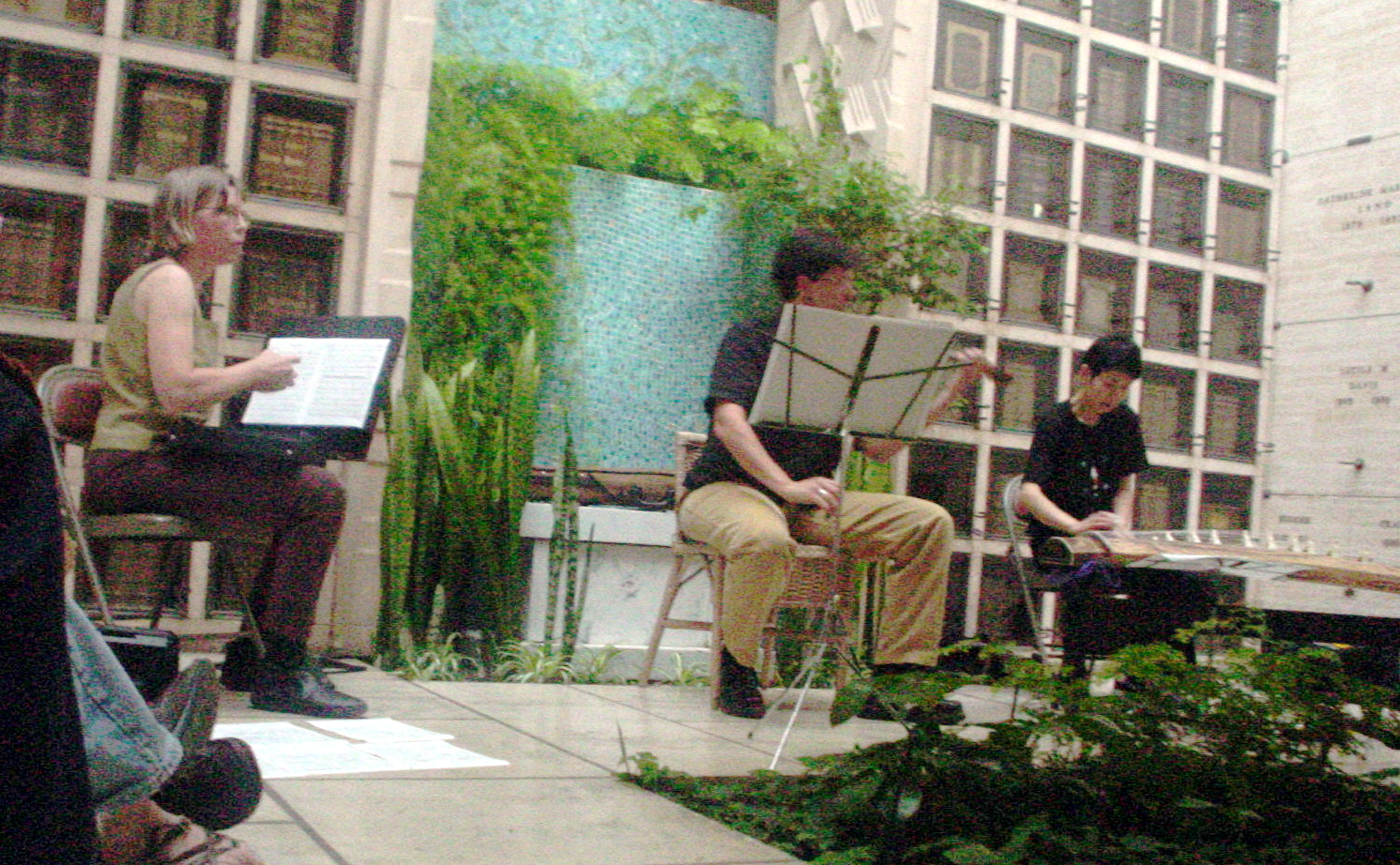
- Genre: Electronic music, experimental music
- Dates: Evening of the summer solstice
- Locations: Chapel of the Chimes (Oakland, California)
- Years active: 1996–present
- Website: Garden of Memory

Garden of Memory has been held 1996–present; this is a columbarium walk-through event held every year on the evening of the summer solstice. It features over 40 musicians performing on unique instruments, or compositions designed for the event. The sound is often electronic or electro-acoustic in source and then electronically processed.

== Notable interments ==
Notable burials include the following:

- Harriet Chalmers Adams (1875–1937), explorer
- Malcolm Playfair Anderson (1879–1919), explorer and zoologist
- Dick Bartell (1907–1995), baseball player
- Grace Richardson Butterfield, California State Parks Board, Grand Matron of the Eastern Star
- Russ Christopher (1917–1954), baseball player
- Frederick George Coppins (1889–1963), Canadian recipient of the Victoria Cross in World War I
- Al Davis (1929–2011), National Football League executive and Oakland Raiders owner
- John A. Elston (1874–1921), US Congressman
- William Frederick "Bones" Ely (1863–1952), baseball player
- Wesley Englehorn (1890–1993), college football player and coach
- Rickey Henderson (1958-2024), Hall of Fame baseball player
- John Lee Hooker (1917–2001), musician
- Charles Goodall Lee (1881–1973), first Chinese American dentist
- Friend Richardson (1865–1943), California governor
- Herbert A. Richardson, timber and shipping magnate
- Stephen Stucker (1947–1986), actor, comedian
- Henry Vollmer (1867–1930), mayor of Davenport, Iowa, US Congressman

== See also ==
- List of cemeteries in California
- List of electronic music festivals
- List of works by Julia Morgan
- List of Oakland Designated Landmarks
