= Adel's Restaurant =

Restaurant information
- Established: 1986
- Closed: June 2019
- Owner: Mike Attalah
- Location: 456 College Avenue, Santa Rosa, Sonoma, California, 95401, United States

Adel's Restaurant was a diner located at the three-way intersection of College Avenue, Mendocino and B Street in Santa Rosa, California.

== History and description ==
The property was purchased by Mike Atallah in 1986, who opened Adel's on the site not long after. At one point, a second location was opened in nearby Healdsburg, but it was eventually sold to another owner. In June 2019, Atallah announced plans to close Adel's so that he could renovate and reopen the space as a more upscale and modern restaurant called "Cafe Mimosa", which eventually opened in February 2020. Adel's was open 24 hours and the menu included typical diner fare such as "triple meat and cheese" three-egg omelettes, flame-broiled burgers with "kitchen sink" toppings, and liver and onions.
