= List of historical landmarks in Healdsburg, California =

The City of Healdsburg maintains a list of Designated Historic Structures and Districts under its Land Use Code. In 1983, a citywide survey identified 339 buildings as historic resources. The list includes two historic districts and eleven structures. The districts and ten of the structures were designated by ordinance of the Healdsburg City Council between 1985 and 1989; Healdsburg Plaza was added by resolution in 1987. The current code was adopted in the 1998 recodification (Ordinance No. 950).

== Legend ==
Also listed on the National Register of Historic Places
Healdsburg Designated Historic Structure or District only

== Historic districts ==
Number	Name	Image	Boundaries	Length	Date designated	Description
District 1	Johnson Street Historic District		Both sides of Johnson Street, Piper Street to Powell Avenue; 38.617644°N 122.869616°W	Approx. 0.5 mi	Ordinance No. 779, November 4, 1985	Residential street that includes the Swisher Mansion (Structure 9).
District 2	Matheson Street Historic District		Both sides of Matheson Street, East Street to First Street; 38.610994°N 122.865194°W	Approx. 0.4 mi	Ordinance No. 779, November 4, 1985	Residential street that includes the Eli Bush House, the George Alexander House (Structure 5) and Sunset Manor (Structure 7).

== Historic structures ==
Number	Name	Image	Address	Date designated	Description
Structure 1	Gobbi Building	Gobbi Building	310–316 Center Street; 38.611143°N 122.869306°W	Ordinance No. 779, November 4, 1985	Commercial false-front building built in 1885; restored in 1984.
Structure 2	Carnegie Library Building	Healdsburg Carnegie Library	221 Matheson Street; 38.611327°N 122.867298°W	Ordinance No. 779, November 4, 1985	Neoclassical Revival Carnegie library built in 1911, designed by Brainerd Jones and built by Frank Sullivan. Originally the Healdsburg Public Library; now the Healdsburg Museum. Listed on the National Register of Historic Places on July 6, 1988 (No. 88000924).
Structure 3	Ransome Powell House	Ransome Powell House	211 North Street; 38.612859°N 122.868074°W	Ordinance No. 811, August 3, 1987	Italianate residence built in 1871 by William H. Middleton; also known as the Powell Mansion and now the Camellia Inn.
Structure 4	First Christian Church		321 East Street; 38.611752°N 122.868754°W	Ordinance No. 821, January 4, 1988	Modified Gothic Revival church built in 1892 by Simpson and Roberts; also known as the Church of Christ.
Structure 5	George Alexander House	George Alexander House	423 Matheson Street; 38.611437°N 122.864023°W	Ordinance No. 821, January 4, 1988	Queen Anne residence built in 1905 by W. H. Chany, within the Matheson Street Historic District.
Structure 6	John Miller House (Calderwood Inn)	Calderwood Inn	25 West Grant Street; 38.616329°N 122.874449°W	Ordinance No. 830, July 18, 1988	Queen Anne cottage built in 1902 by Samuel S. Kirkham; now the Calderwood Inn.
Structure 7	Sunset Manor (Patchett House)	Sunset Manor (Patchett House)	410 Matheson Street; 38.610797°N 122.864630°W	Ordinance No. 821, January 4, 1988	Neoclassical residence built in 1921, within the Matheson Street Historic District.
Structure 8	Villa Chanticleer	Villa Chanticleer	1248 Fitch Mountain Road; 38.621732°N 122.849425°W	Ordinance No. 838, December 5, 1988	City-owned Western Stick–style event hall built in 1947.
Structure 9	Swisher Mansion	Swisher Mansion	642 Johnson Street; 38.617521°N 122.869277°W	Ordinance No. 848, May 1, 1989	Queen Anne residence built 1900–1903 by James W. Terry, within the Johnson Street Historic District.
Structure 10	Frank Passalacqua House	Frank Passalacqua House	726 Fitch Street; 38.618615°N 122.866965°W	Ordinance No. 851, October 2, 1989	Neoclassical Revival residence built in 1914, designed by Brainerd Jones and built by William J. Cuneo, with brickwork by James Burgett and Son.
Structure 11 (Note: The Plaza appears on the City's list but, unlike the other entries, was added by City Council resolution rather than designated by ordinance. Resolution No. 96-87 (1987) also authorized an application for California Historical Landmark status, with the State to assign a landmark number on designation. The Plaza is not a California Historical Landmark.)	Healdsburg Plaza		300 Healdsburg Avenue; bounded by Healdsburg Avenue, Plaza Street, Center Street and Matheson Street; 38.610811°N 122.870033°W	Resolution No. 96-87, July 6, 1987	Town square laid out in 1857.

== See also ==
- California Historical Landmarks in Sonoma County, California
- List of cemeteries in Sonoma County, California
- List of National Historic Landmarks in California
- National Register of Historic Places listings in Sonoma County, California
- Sonoma County Historic Landmarks and Districts
