= Healdsburg Carnegie Library =

- U.S. National Register of Historic Places
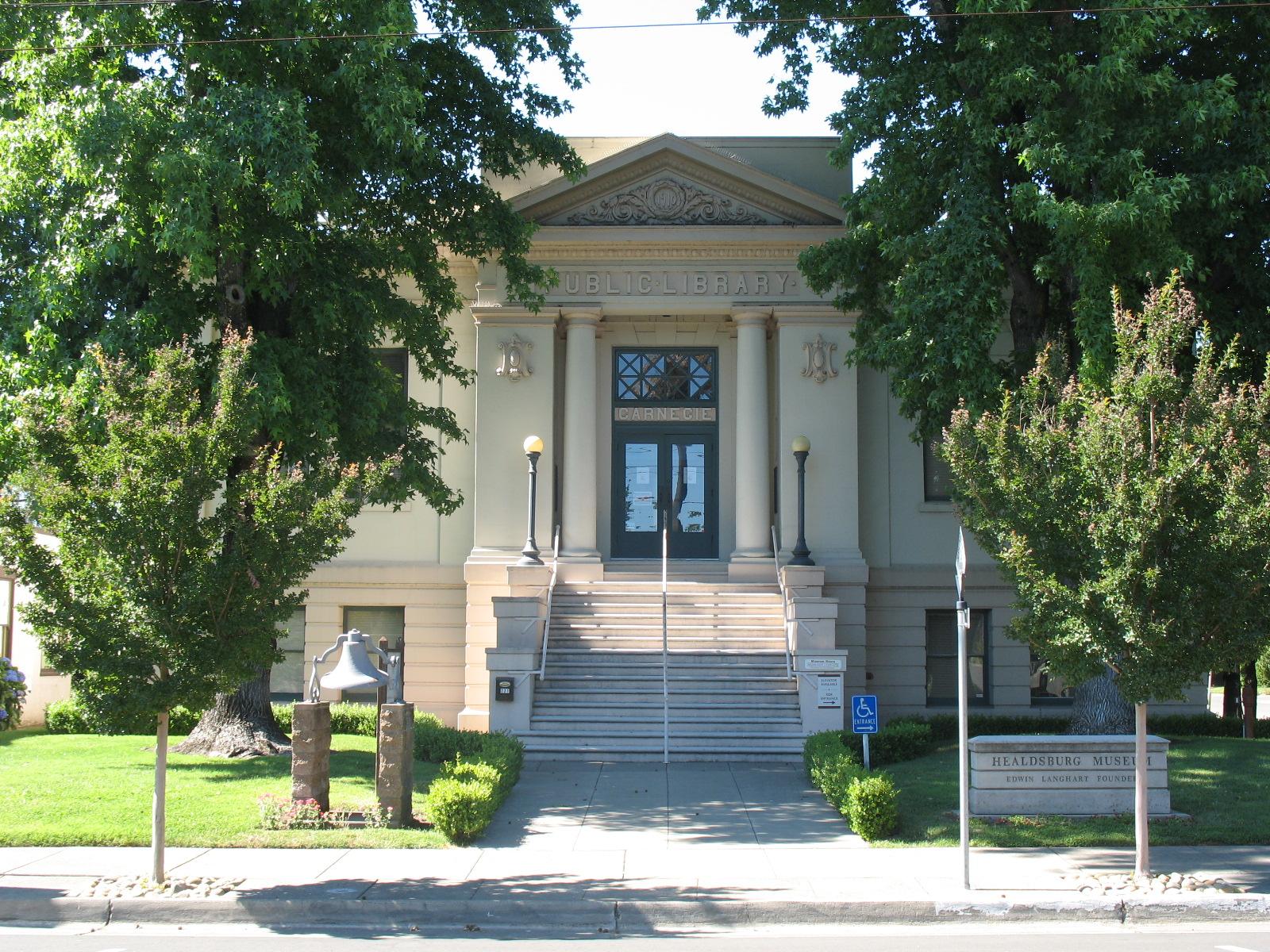
- Building in 2010

- Location within California
- Location: 221 Matheson St., Healdsburg, California
- Coordinates: 38°37′13″N 122°51′58″W
- Area: 0.2 acres (0.081 ha)
- Built: 1910-11
- Built by: Frank Sullivan
- Architect: Brainerd Jones
- Architectural style: Classical Revival
- NRHP reference No.: 88000924
- Added to NRHP: July 6, 1988

The Healdsburg Carnegie Library, which was also known as the Healdsburg Public Library and is now the Healdsburg Museum, is a Carnegie library built in 1911 in Healdsburg, California. It was listed on the National Register of Historic Places in 1988,.

== History ==
Healdsburg applied for a grant from the Carnegie Foundation in 1908 and was awarded a $10,000 grant in 1909. It was one of five Carnegie Library buildings constructed in Sonoma County. Noted Bay Area Architect Brainerd Jones designed the building in Classical Revival style, incorporating the columns, stairs, and pediment typical of Classical and Neoclassical structures. Contractor Frank Sullivan of Santa Rosa was the contractor, and it was built during 1910–11. By the mid-1980s the library outgrew the structure and moved to a new facility. After extensive interior renovations the Healdsburg Museum opened in the building in 1990.

== Pictures ==
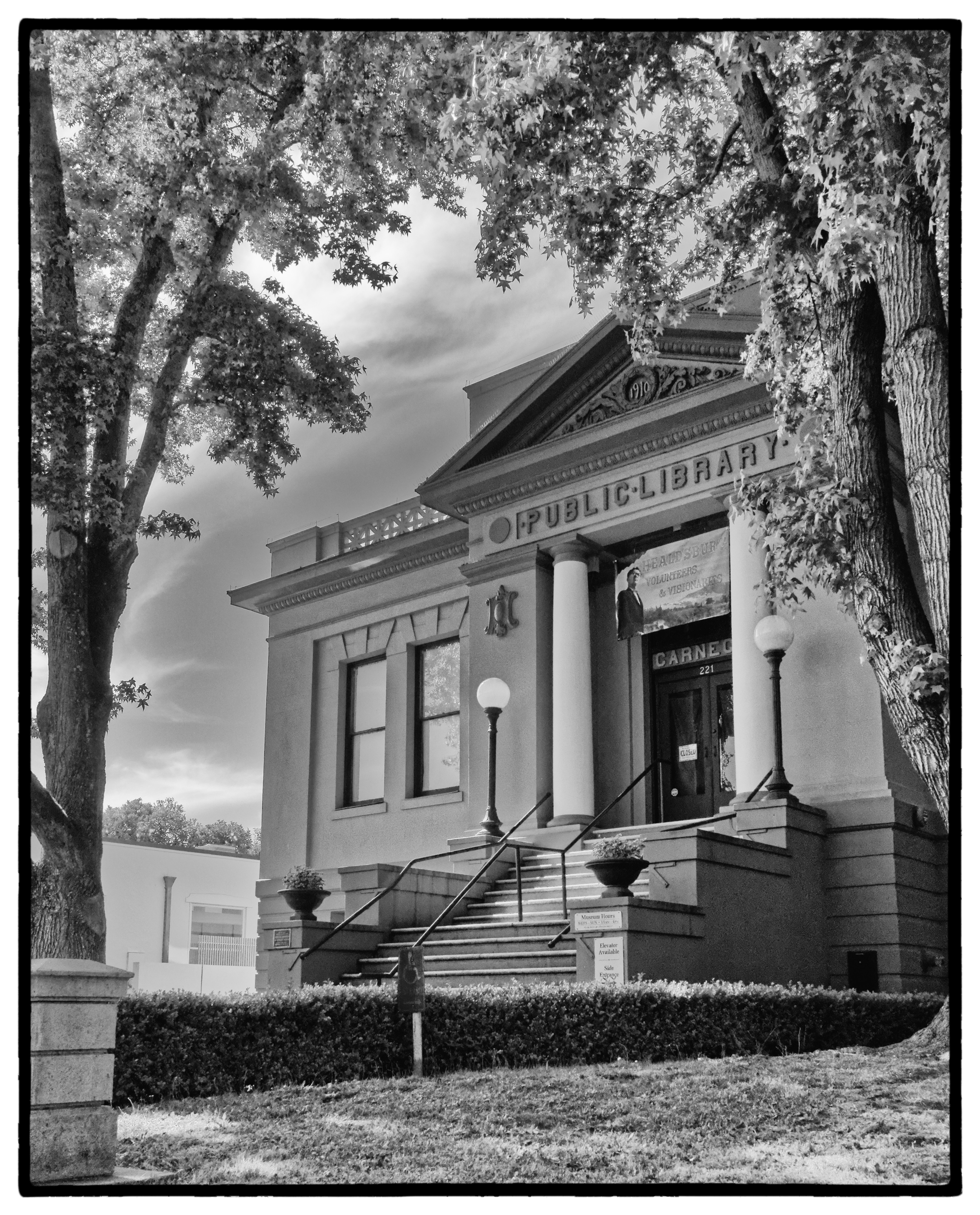
Carnegie Public Library, Healdsburg, California

== See also ==
- List of historical landmarks in Healdsburg, California
- Healdsburg Memorial Bridge, also listed on the National Register
