= Julius Fried =

- Born: September 26, 1872; Healdsburg, California, United States
- Died: October 9, 1958 (aged 86); Beverly Hills, California, United States
- Resting place: Forest Lawn Memorial Park, Glendale
- Occupations: Oil promoter, businessman, investor
- Known for: Lakeview Gusher (1910), philanthropy, early California oil development
- Spouse: Maude Gorman (m. 1898; div. 1903) Dorothy G. Cramer (m. 1910–1958)
- Relatives: Fredericka Matheuse (mother), Henry Fried (father)

Julius Fried (September 26, 1872 – October 9, 1958) was an American oilman, entrepreneur, and investor, best known for his role in the development of the Midway-Sunset Oil Field and the historic 1910 Lakeview Gusher—the largest accidental oil spill in U.S. history. A Healdsburg native, Fried amassed a personal fortune through early oil exploration, land ownership, and citrus farming, and later became a notable philanthropist in Southern California.

== Early life ==
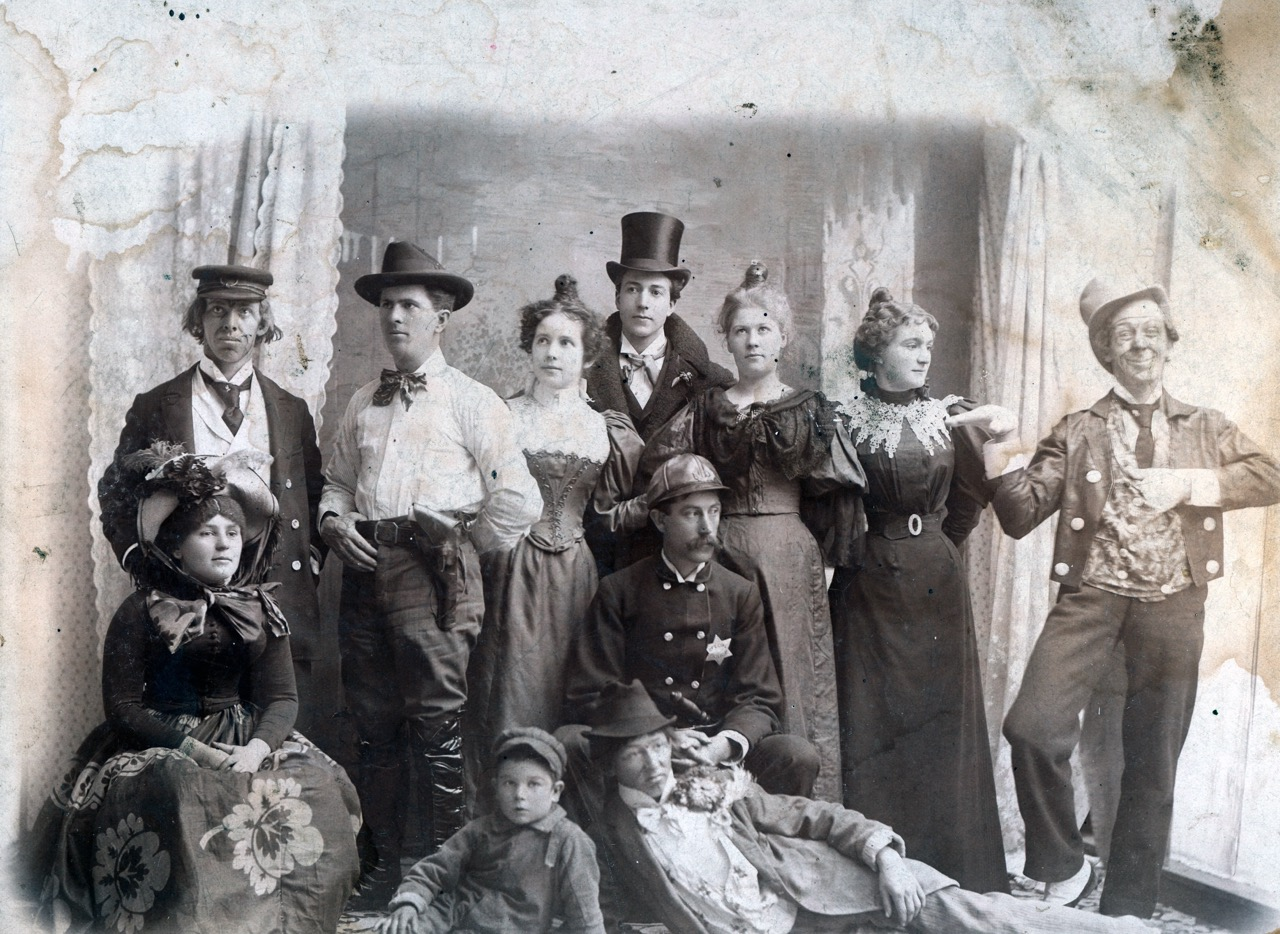
“The Streets of New York” performance by the Healdsburg Dramatic Club (1895). Julius Fried appears back row center as Mark Livingston.

Julius Fried was born in 1872 in Healdsburg, California, the youngest child of German‑American immigrants Henry Fried and Fredericka Matheuse.

He graduated from Healdsburg High School in 1891 as the school’s first male graduate, and went on to study business at Heald’s Business College in San Francisco. Returning to Healdsburg in 1892, he worked at the Farmers and Mechanics Bank and later co‑founded a private school with educator W.S. Coffman.

Fried was active in civic life and a regular performer in community theatre productions such as “The Streets of New York”(1895), in which he played Mark Livingston. He also participated in literary societies and in organizing social gatherings in Healdsburg during the 1890s.

== Oil Industry and the Lakeview Gusher ==
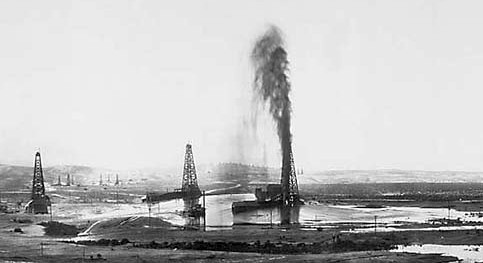
The Lakeview No. 1 gusher in 1910, Kern County, California. At its peak, the well was flowing uncontrollably at over 90,000 barrels per day.

In 1908, Julius Fried co-founded the Lakeview Oil Company with R.D. Wade, F.E. Dunlap, and Charles Off, raising $100,000 in capital. Fried had studied the geology of the Sunset-Midway Oil Field and leased land previously considered barren. Drilling began in late 1908.

On March 15, 1910, at a depth of 2,440 feet, the well blew out in what would become known as the Lakeview Gusher—the largest accidental oil spill in U.S. history. The gusher destroyed the derrick and spewed oil hundreds of feet into the air for 18 months. Fried, who had retained a substantial ownership stake, became instantly wealthy. By the time the well was capped in September 1911, it had produced an estimated 9 million barrels of oil.

The success of Lakeview propelled Fried into a prominent role in California’s oil industry for decades, with continued ventures in Tejon Hills, Santa Margarita, and Los Angeles.

== Later Ventures ==
Fried married Dorothy G. Cramer in 1910 at the Hotel Del Monte in Pacific Grove. The couple settled in Los Angeles and acquired multiple properties over the years, including homes in Santa Monica, South Hobart Boulevard, and eventually 10231 Charing Cross Road in Beverly Hills.

He invested in citrus farming, owning a 50-acre ranch in Chatsworth, and continued working in oil exploration. In 1948, he sold 500 acres—including the Lakeview site—to the General Petroleum Corporation for $2 million.

He remained involved in the Tejon Hills and Santa Margarita oil fields and in 1953 sold his shares in the Tejon Hills Company for over $3.6 million.

== Legacy and philanthropy ==
Fried is considered one of the wealthiest individuals to originate from Healdsburg, California. At the peak of the Lakeview Gusher's production, The Los Angeles Times reported that Fried was earning between $2,000 and $3,000 per day in royalties, equivalent to over $90,000 per day in 2023 dollars. His extensive oil royalties, land holdings in Southern California, and diversified business ventures placed him among the most financially successful Californians of his era with rural origins.

Following his death in 1958, Fried’s estate provided generous bequests to family members and charitable organizations. His most significant philanthropic legacy was a major endowment to the City of Hope National Medical Center, which administered the Julius and Dorothy Fried Foundation for cancer research and treatment. Established through his will, the Julius and Dorothy Fried Research Foundation supported a number of scientific and medical research initiatives, including studies on cancer cell metabolism ("Folate and Pterin Metabolism by Cancer Cells in Culture"), tumor DNA research ("Reversal of Malignant Transformation by Tumor DNA"), and neonatal physiology ("Nature of the Sweating Deficit of Prematurely Born Neonates").

== See also ==
- Lakeview Gusher
- Midway-Sunset Oil Field
