= Grace Richardson Butterfield =

- Born: Grace Belle Richardson; March 10, 1879; Stewarts Point, Sonoma County, California
- Died: July 26, 1962; San Francisco, California
- Resting place: Chapel of the Chimes, Oakland, California
- Occupation(s): Philanthropist, Activist
- Spouse: Jack Butterfield
- Parent(s): Herbert Archer "H.A." Richardson, Althea Ella Ball

Grace Belle Richardson Butterfield (10 March 1879 – 26 July 1962) was the daughter of timber baron and shipping magnate, Herbert Archer Richardson. She held numerous offices in local and state General Federation of Women's Clubs, and was the California Worthy Grand Matron of the Eastern Star.

== Biography ==
Born Grace Belle Richardson in Stewart's Point, California, to timber baron and shipping magnate, Herbert Archer Richardson, and Althea Ella Ball, who were married in Lisbon, New Hampshire, before they arrived in California in 1876. Grace was the first of three children; her siblings were Archer Herbert Richardson and Fontaine Harold Richardson.

A member of the Harmony chapter of the Order of the Eastern Star, Grace was named California Worthy Grand Matron in 1933. To celebrate the designation of Grand Matron, she traveled throughout the state attending and speaking at numerous Eastern Star events, that included the 50th Anniversary of the Adin Chapter in Bieber, California, and a lavish reception held by the Santa Cruz chapter at the Casa del Rey.

Grace was very active in the General Federation of Women's Clubs. She was the President, of the City and County Federation of Women's Clubs in San Francisco, and the Chairman of Junior Membership both at the State and District Level. Grace was also the Director of the Western Women's Club, President of the To Kalon Club, a Member of the League of Women's Voters.

== The Gracie Belle ==
Herbert Archer Richardson, Grace's father, named a pair of his many ships, the Gracie Belle Richardson after his daughter. The Gracie Belle #1, and the Gracie Belle #2 both sailed up and down the California Coast in the late 1880s and 1890s. Both ships came to peril on the rocky Sonoma coastline, one at Fisk Mill Cove in the 1880s, and the second one in 1892. Her father swore to never use her name for another ship.

== California State Parks Commission ==
In 1936, California Governor Frank Merriam appointed Grace to the California State Parks Commission, after he ousted Mrs. Edmund Brown without notice from the Board. Mrs. Edmund Brown refused to resign from the board and claimed that this was part of a larger political ploy. Grace toured all of the State Parks in California while she was on the commission, and gave instructive talks throughout the State on all 70 of the State Parks. Her state-wide tour started in March 1936, when she toured Armstrong Woods with James Snook, the Chief of the California State Parks Division, to inspect the building of the Amphitheater; they also took time to visit General Vallejo's home and the Sonoma Mission on the same trip.

In the fall of 1936, Grace joined her fellow Park Commissioners to formally open efforts to save the Redwoods along the highway near Benbow and north of Eureka.

== Personal life ==
Grace was born March 10, 1879 in Stewarts Point, California to Herbert Archer Richardson and Althea Ella Ball. She married accountant John Edward "Jack" Butterfield of Healdsburg, California, and the couple made their home in San Francisco. In addition to their San Francisco home, Grace and her husband owned a 2400-acre ranch at Russian Gulch, just a few miles north of Jenner, California. The couple had no children. Her uncle was Harvey G. Richardson of Olympia, Washington.
