= Mary Ellen Bamford =

American author

Mary Ellen Bamford (December 10, 1857 – May 21, 1946) was an American writer from Healdsburg, California.

== Early years and education ==
Mary Ellen Bamford was born in Healdsburg, California, the daughter of Dr. William Bamford and Cornelia Elizabeth Rand; her parents were pioneer settlers. In the 1850s, her father, born in Ireland, had traveled across the plains whilst Cornelia Rand had arrived by California from her native New Hampshire by sea via Cape Horn. Her parents married on February 16, 1857, in Santa Rosa, California. Mary Ellen Bamford had an older half brother, Edmund L. Bamford, from Dr. Bamford's previous marriage, and a younger sister, Chloe L. Bamford. Mary lived in 1235 E. 15th Street, Oakland, California, in what was declared on November 17, 1981, a designated landmark, the Dr. William Bamford House. She was educated in public schools in Oakland.

== Career ==
After finishing school, she spent four years working as an assistant in the Oakland Free Public Library, however writing remained her career. In 1879, famous novelist Robert Louis Stevenson was treated by Mary's father, and visited their home frequently. As a token of gratitude for treating him and saving his life, as Stevenson claimed, in April 1880 Stevenson gave Dr. Bamford an inscribed copy of his pioneering book about outdoor literature "Travels with a Donkey in the Cévennes", which Mary kept for years.

Bamford was an active prohibitionist and she was also secretary of the regional Woman's Baptist Foreign Missionary Society. She supplied books to a number of publishers including the American Baptist Publication Society. In contrast to most Americans at the time, Bamford was sympathetic to Chinese and other Asians attempting to enter the United States. Although most scholars today do not accept her claim that the Angel Island Immigration Station was "the Ellis Island of the West," Bamford's study continues to be cited today. Bamford also wrote for Sunday schools of several denominations.

By 1882, Bamford and her mother were the only members of her immediate family left, and upon her mother's death on May 6 she was left a property in Twin Lake Park in Santa Cruz worth $7933.77 in 2017 US dollars. She died in 1946 at age 88, and her funeral services were held at the Grant D. Miller Mortuaries. Inc.

== Selected works ==
- Up and Down the Brooks. Houghton, Mifflin & Co. (1889)
- Her Twenty Heathen. Pilgrim Press.
- My Land and Water Friends. D. Lothrop & Co. (1886)
- The Look About Club. D. Lothrop & Co. (1887)
- Second Year of the Look About Club. D. Lothrop & Co.
- Janet and Her Father. Congregational S.S. & Pub. Soc. (1891)
- Marie's story. A tale of the days of Louis XIV.. Congregational S.S. & Pub. Soc. (1888)
- Miss Millie's Trying. Hunt & Eaton. (1892)
- Number One or Number Two. Hunt & Eaton. (1891)
- A Piece of Kitty Hunter's Life. Hunt & Eaton. (1890)
- Father Lambert's family : a story of old-time France. Phillips & Hunt. (1888)
- Thoughts of My Dumb Neighbors. Phillips & Hunt. (1887)
- Eleanor and I. Congregational S.S. & Pub. Soc. (1891)
- Talks by Queer Folks. D. Lothrop Co.
- Jessie's Three Resolutions. Am. Bap. Pub. Soc. (1894)
- In Editha's Days. Am. Baptist Pub. Soc. (1894)
- Three Roman Girls. Am. Baptist Pub. Soc. (1893)
- Out of the Triangle: a Story of the Far East. David C. Cook Publishing Co. (1898)
- Ti: A Story of San Francisco's Chinatown. David C. Cook Co. (1899)
- Angel Island: the Ellis Island of the West. Woman's American Baptist Home Mission Society (1917)
- The Denby Children at the Fair. David C. Cook Co.
