= Abel de Luna =

Entrepreneur and former mayor of Healdsburg

- Born: 27 July 1946 (age 80); Colonia Modelo, Zacatecas, Mexico
- Education: Colegio Comercial Pérez (Cd. Juárez, Chihuahua)
- Occupations: Entrepreneur; music producer; politician
- Spouses: Emilia Escareño Ávila (1969–1990); Arelia García Viramontes (m. 1994)
- Children: 5

Mayor of Healdsburg, California
- In office 1978–1980

Healdsburg City Council Member
- In office 1976–1978

Abel de Luna (born July 27, 1946, in Colonia Modelo, Zacatecas, Mexico) is a Mexican-American entrepreneur, music executive, and former politician. He served as the first Latino mayor of Healdsburg, California. He is also the founder of Luna Music and Moon Broadcasting, and continues to promote regional Mexican music across the United States.

== Career ==
=== Politics ===
In 1976, de Luna was elected to the Healdsburg City Council, and then was appointed mayor in 1978, becoming the first Latino and youngest person to hold the position in the city's history. During his tenure (1978–1980), he championed infrastructure projects including a new wastewater system, public swimming pool, police training programs, and increased access to Spanish-language television for the community.

In 2025, the City of Healdsburg officially renamed its Community Center the “Abel de Luna Community Center” in recognition of his civic contributions.

=== Business ===
==== Music industry ====
Abel de Luna is the co-founder and treasurer of Promotores Unidos USA, an organization that promotes regional Mexican music. In 2025, Billboard cited de Luna's long-time role in the U.S. regional Mexican concert market in a business report on how immigration crackdowns have affected Latin music. The piece recalls a 2007 interview where De Luna, then a California-based member of Promotores Unidos, estimated that tightened enforcement accounted for a "20%–25%" drop in his concert promotion business. de Luna also founded the record label Luna Music, an independent label he established to promote regional Mexican artists; and Moon Broadcasting, a radio network broadcasting regional Mexican music, which currently includes the formats La Máquina Musical and La Musikera.

Throughout his career, de Luna has worked with artists such as Arkangel R15, among others. He owns two Spanish language radio stations, KRRS and KZNB.

==== Other interests ====
de Luna founded and operated La Luna Market, a chain of Latino-oriented supermarkets in Napa and Sonoma counties, which became a community hub for immigrant families in Northern California.
