= Honor Mansion =

Historic building in California, U.S.

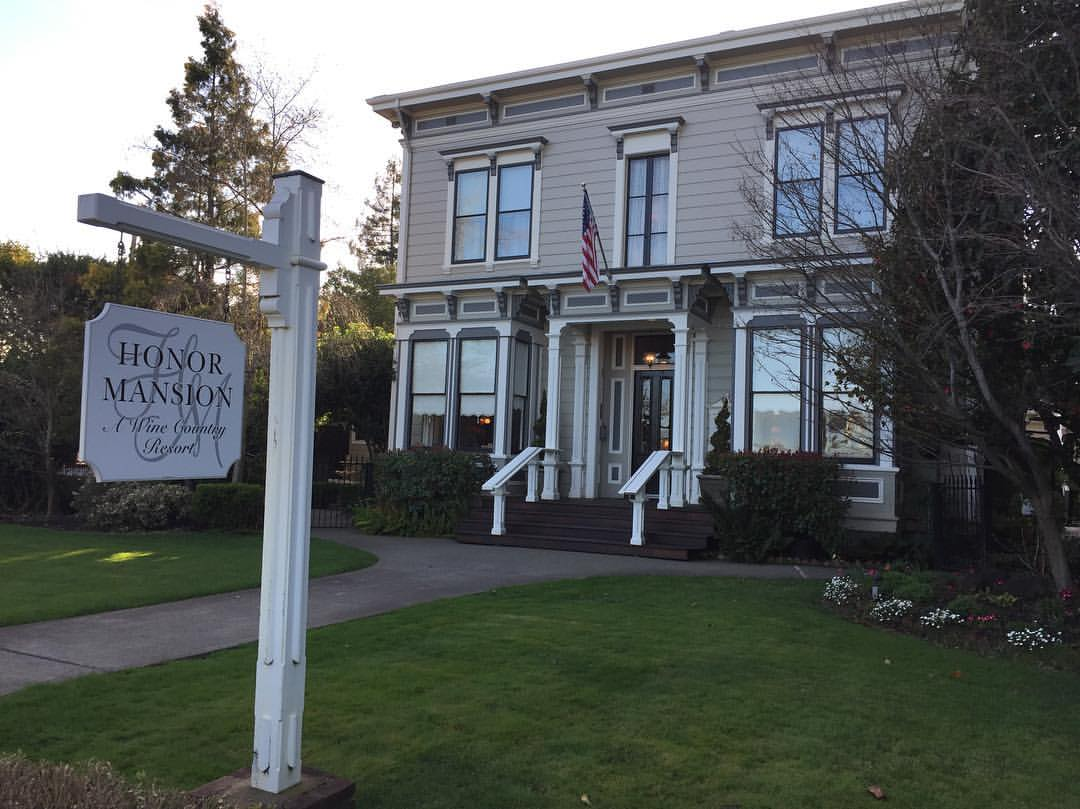
- The Honor Mansion in 2016

- Location within California Honor Mansion (the United States)

General information
- Location: 891 Grove Street; Healdsburg, California; United States
- Coordinates: 38°37′13.26″N 122°52′34.17″W
- Owner: Steve Fowler; Cathi Fowler

Technical details
- Floor count: 2

Other information
- Number of rooms: 13
- Number of suites: 5
- Number of restaurants: 1
- Parking: On site

Website
- Official website

The Honor Mansion is a historic building located in Healdsburg, California, United States. Built in 1883, the mansion remained in the same family until 1994. It is now a bed and breakfast accommodation.

== History ==
The historic mansion was built in 1883 by William "Squire" Butcher in the Victorian Italianate style. Butcher was wealthy, having made money during the California Gold Rush. He discovered gold after his wagon full of potbelly stoves collapsed due to the weight. The collapse exposed a vein of gold underneath the wagon. At the time he built the mansion, he was a cattle rancher. He started raising cattle after he discovered gold and bought a property in Vacaville, California, to start his new business. Eventually, Butcher, his wife, and four daughters relocated to Healdsburg, near the Pacific Union College, where his children would attend college. Upon relocating to Healdsburg, he built the mansion that would eventually be called the Honor Mansion.

Butcher's daughter, Bertha, married Henry Honor, who was also a rancher. Bertha gave birth to a son, Herbert Clyde. Herbert Clyde became a medical doctor and married Vera, also a doctor. The couple went to the Philippines to medical services as missionaries. When World War II erupted, the couple were imprisoned by the Japanese and were prisoners of war for 10 months. Eventually, in 1958, they were freed and returned to Healdsburg. The couple moved back to the mansion, providing primary care services to the community in an annex located on the property.

At one point, the couple renovated the mansion, making one room a living quarter for themselves and two other rooms that would serve as guest rooms, for travelers, marking the shift from family home to bed and breakfast. The two families (Butcher and Honor) owned the property for 108 years total.

In 1994, Cathi and Steve Fowler purchased the property. The property underwent six months of renovations and reopened as a bed & breakfast resort.
