= Rosinda Holmes =

Canadian-born American printmaker and painter

- Born: Rosinda Ellen Sellers; March 6, 1917; Rosedale, British Columbia, Canada
- Died: November 2, 2001 (aged 84); Healdsburg, California, U.S.
- Education: Chouinard Art Institute
- Known for: Printmaking, painting
- Movement: California printmaking
- Spouse: Rexford Donald Holmes

Rosinda Ellen (Sellers) Holmes (March 6, 1917 – November 2, 2001) was a Canadian-born American printmaker and painter. Trained at the Chouinard Art Institute in Los Angeles, she worked primarily in etching, lithography, and watercolor. Holmes lived and worked for much of her career in Healdsburg, California, where she was active in the local arts community.

== Biography ==
Holmes was born in Rosedale, British Columbia, in 1917. She studied at the Chouinard Art Institute in Los Angeles, graduating in 1940. Early in her career she worked in advertising in San Diego and later moved to San Francisco, where she and her husband, artist Rexford Donald Holmes, lived in the former studio of painter Maynard Dixon.

In 1958, the couple purchased a prune farm near Healdsburg, California, where they established their home and studios. Holmes remained there for the rest of her life, balancing farm life with her artistic practice. She died in Healdsburg in 2001 at the age of 84.

== Work ==
Holmes worked in printmaking and painting, producing etchings, lithographs, and watercolors. Her subjects included San Francisco streetscapes, regional architecture, and Northern California landscapes.

She exhibited with the San Francisco Art Association, at the Labaudt Gallery, and at the San Francisco Museum of (Modern) Art in 1946. During the 1950s her work was also shown at Gump's department store in San Francisco.

Holmes was a member of the San Francisco Women Artists and the Healdsburg Art Association. Her works are preserved in the collections of the Healdsburg Museum and Historical Society.

== Legacy ==
Holmes is recognized as part of Healdsburg's 20th-century art community. After her death, the Rosinda & Rexford Holmes Memorial Art Scholarship was established at Healdsburg High School to support emerging student artists.
