= Effie Robinson =

American social worker and public housing director

- Born: January 7, 1920; Healdsburg, California, United States
- Died: May 23, 2003 (aged 83); Cow Hollow neighborhood of San Francisco, California, United States
- Education: San Francisco State University, UC Berkeley School of Social Welfare
- Occupations: social worker, public housing director

Effie Robinson (January 7, 1920 – May 23, 2003) was a social worker and public housing director. She was the first African American graduate from the UC Berkeley School of Social Welfare.

== Biography ==
Effie Robinson was born in Healdsburg, California, January 7, 1920. A 1943 magna cum laude graduate of San Francisco State University, Robinson was the first African American graduate from the UC Berkeley School of Social Welfare. She was a member of Alpha Kappa Alpha.

Art Agnos worked as her assistant when she was appointed, in 1964 by Mayor John F. Shelley to be the San Francisco Housing Authority Director of Human Relations and Tenant Services.

In 1945 Robinson went to work for the Family Service Agency of San Francisco. Her first job was as a casework supervisor and by 1956, Robinson was appointed Executive Director.

Robinson died when she was 83 at her time in the Cow Hollow neighborhood of San Francisco.

== Awards and honors ==
Robinson was awarded the Daniel Koshland Jr. Award in Social Welfare in 1974 by the National Association of Social Workers.
