= Foss Creek =

- Location of the mouth of Foss Creek in California

Location
- Country: United States
- State: California
- Region: Sonoma
- Municipality: Healdsburg

Physical characteristics
- Source
  - location: Tulip Court, Healdsburg
  - coordinates: 38°37′36″N 122°52′16″W
- Mouth: West Slough
  - location: south of Healdsburg
  - coordinates: 38°36′12″N 122°52′08″W
  - elevation: 102 ft (31 m)

Foss Creek is a rain-fed watercourse in the San Francisco Bay Area. It is considered a tributary of the Russian River.

== Route ==
Foss Creek traverses the city of Healdsburg, from north to south, originating near Passalacqua Road and flowing into Dry Creek near the U.S. 101 Central Healdsburg interchange.

The creek features a number of street and railway crossings (the railroad roughly follows parallel to the waterway's contours, falling into the creek in disrepair at some points), and carries runoff from the city, ameliorating the risk of flooding during heavy rainfall.

In places, the creek runs under the city's Healdsburg Avenue. The waterway also passes two notable Sonoma County wine production centres: the Simi Winery and the Seghesio Winery.

Al Foss was an aeronautics engineer, and lived in Yorba Linda, California. Despite this, he would spend the summers at his hotel/bar/river guiding business in Orleans outside of Happy Camp on the Klamath River. He re-introduced steelhead trout to a portion of the river and they named it after him, the Foss Riffles, as well as Foss Creek.

== Wetland preservation ==
Several sensitive wetland areas bound the creek. These are the subject of several conservation and restoration programmes. The Foss Creek Community Restoration Project aims to restore native plants to the creek and its surrounding areas, removing large amounts of invasive, non-native plants in order to improve the local wildlife habitat.

== 2014 storm ==
During a storm in December 2014, which dumped 8.4 inches (210 mm) of rain in 24 hours, Foss Creek overflowed its banks, flooding portions of downtown Healdsburg and forcing the closure of City Hall. Automobiles were submerged to the level of their windows, roughly 150 business were affected, and two dozen businesses suffered interior water damage.

== See also ==
- List of watercourses in the San Francisco Bay Area
