= Annapolis, California =

Unincorporated community in California, United States

- Unincorporated community
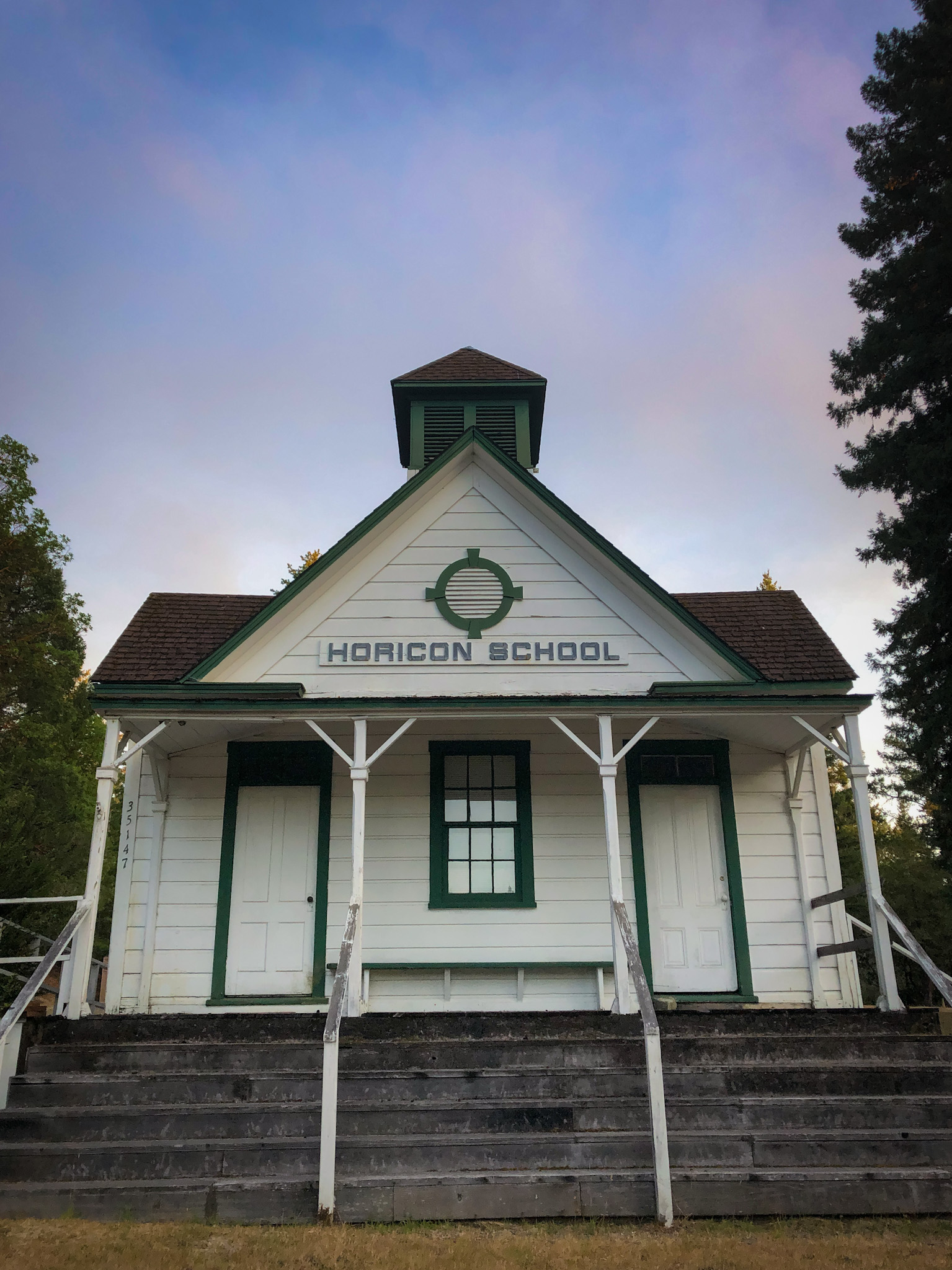
- Old Horicon Schoolhouse along Annapolis Road

- Location within California
- Coordinates: 38°43′19″N 123°22′11″W
- Country: United States
- State: California
- County: Sonoma
- Elevation: 771 ft (235 m)

Population (2010)
  - Total: 401
- Time zone: UTC-8 (Pacific (PST))
  - Summer (DST): UTC-7 (PDT)
- ZIP code: 95412
- Area code: 707
- GNIS feature ID: 1657935

Annapolis (formerly Monti) is an unincorporated community in Sonoma County, California, United States. Annapolis is situated near the coastline of northern Sonoma County, and is 5 miles (8.0 km) north-northeast of the nearest community, Stewarts Point. Annapolis is served by ZIP code 95412. The community is named after Annapolis Orchards, which was founded in the area in the 1880s. As of 2010, Annapolis has about 401 residents.

== History ==
The earliest non-Native settlers in the area were Americans moving into the area after the cession of California to the United States. However, extensive settlement did not occur until the early 1870s, when San Francisco developer J.C. Beatty claimed and cleared approximately 1200 acres of redwood forest for resale.

In 1882, San Francisco-based Wetmore Brothers Commission Merchants purchased part of Beatty's lands and developed a commercial orchard, named "Annapolis Orchard" after their homeland, Annapolis Valley, Nova Scotia. Wetmore Brothers grew fruit on its own properties, and purchased local fruit growers' produce to sell on commission. The area was known for its output of fresh and dried apples, producing then-popular varieties such as the Gravenstein and Baldwin.

The area's first post office operated between 1884 and 1888. It was called the Monti Post Office, the name a reference to the area's rugged hills. The community used the name to refer to the area during this short time. In 1901, responding to the community's desire to open another post office, Wetmore Brothers worked with local fruit grower George Batt to open the Annapolis Post Office. This post office operated until 2011.

Redwood logging and milling served as a primary industry in the area for many years.

== Features ==
Annapolis is a part of the Sonoma Coast AVA, and is known for its pinot noir. Many domestic and foreign winery developers have redeveloped former orchards.

Annapolis is home to the Starcross Monastic Community. Since 1980, the Annapolis Historical Society has maintained the 1877 Horicon Schoolhouse. Kayaking, fishing, and boating are popular activities in the surrounding areas.

== Education ==
The community has one school, Horicon School, a K-8 public school. Students who attend Horicon School are transitioned to the Point Arena Joint Union High District, and attend Point Arena High School in Point Arena, Mendocino County.

== Climate ==
This region experiences warm (but not hot) and dry summers, with no average monthly temperatures above 71.6 °F. According to the Köppen Climate Classification system, Annapolis has a warm-summer Mediterranean climate, abbreviated "Csb" on climate maps.
