= Lakeview Gusher =

1910 oil spill in California, US

Lakeview Gusher Number One
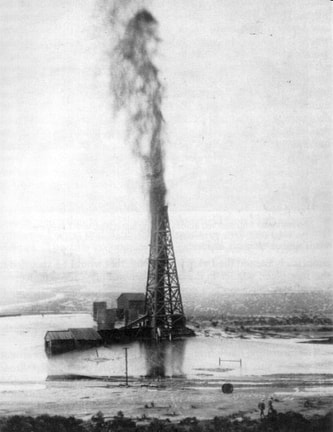
- The Lakeview gusher with a lake of crude oil surrounding the derrick, mid-1910
- Location: Kern County, California
- Coordinates: 35°05′29″N 119°24′05″W
- Date: 15 March 1910 – September 1911

Cause
- Cause: Wellhead blowout
- Operator: Lakeview Oil Company

Spill characteristics
- Volume: 9 million barrels (1.4×10^{6} m^{3})

California Historical Landmark
- Reference no.: 485

The Lakeview Gusher was an eruption of hydrocarbons from a pressurized oil well in the Midway-Sunset Oil Field in Kern County, California, in 1910. Caused by a blowout, it created the largest accidental oil spill in history, lasting 18 months and releasing an estimated 9 million barrels (1.4×10^{6} m^{3}) of crude oil.

Midway-Sunset was one of the largest oil reserves in the United States. When drilling commenced, the Lakeview Oil Company expected natural gas and a small amount of oil. Instead, there was a large blowout which overloaded storage tanks.

The geyser released more than 1.2 million short tons (1,100,000 t) of crude oil, far more than any other single leak on land or water. Its site is located about a half-mile (800 m) east of the Taft–Maricopa Highway, California Route 33, marked by a Caltrans guide sign and a bronze plaque designated as California Historical Landmark number 485.

== Background ==
The Lakeview Oil Company, organized by Julius Fried, R.D. Wade, F.E. Dunlap, and Charles F. Off started drilling at its Number One well on 1 January 1909. According to legend, Fried had picked the spot because of an assumption that clumps of red grass indicated good oil land. Initially only natural gas was found. As work continued the company exhausted funds and partnered with the Union Oil Company, which wanted to build storage tanks there.

Early twentieth-century drilling technology lacked such modern safety features as blowout preventers. When drilling reached a well depth of 2,440 ft (740 m) on 15 March 1910, pressurized oil blew through the well casing above the bit. An estimated 9 million barrels (1.4×10^{6} m^{3}) escaped before the gusher was brought under control in September 1911.

The initial daily flow was 18,800 barrels (2,990 m^{3}), creating a river of crude that crews rushed to contain with improvised sand bag dams and dikes. Peak flow reached 90,000 barrels (14,000 m^{3}) per day, diverted via a pipeline to storage tanks 2.5 miles (4.0 km) away, where an 8-inch (200 mm) line led to Port Avila on the coast. In total, 378 million gallons of oil was released, and about 40% was captured. This surplus dropped the price to 30 cents a barrel, about half of what it was prior to the blowout. No fire or dangerous flooding resulted from this spill.

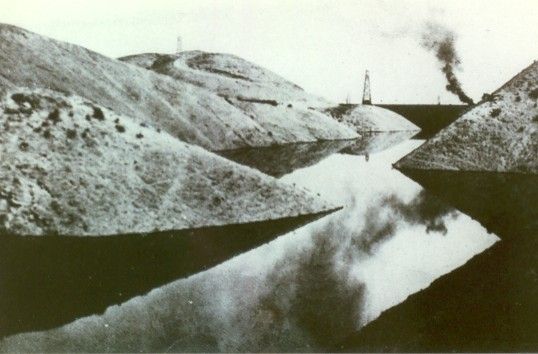
River of crude contained by dikes

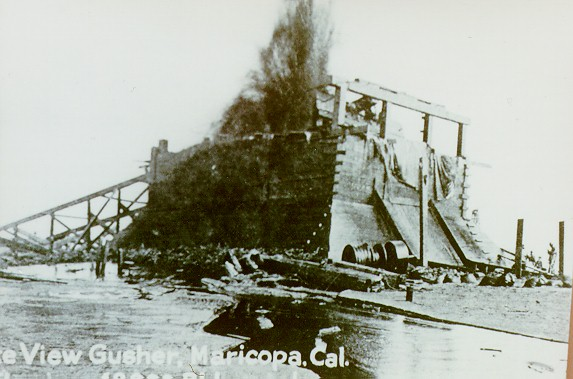
A timber containment box was pulled over the gusher with heavy cables, soon destroyed by the oil's pressure

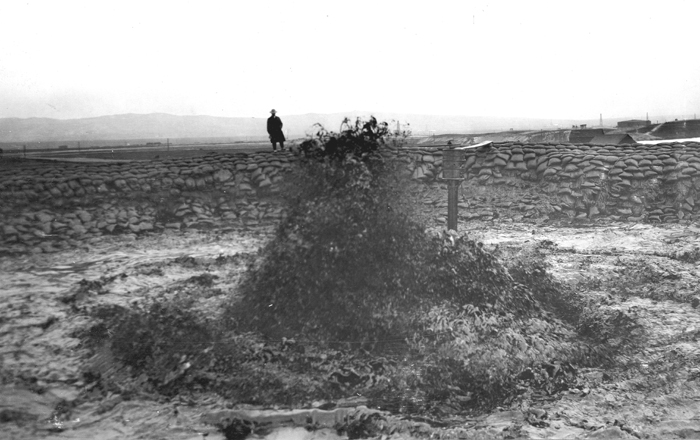
Gusher after the well had partially subsided, the derrick removed, and the well surrounded by a sandbag berm

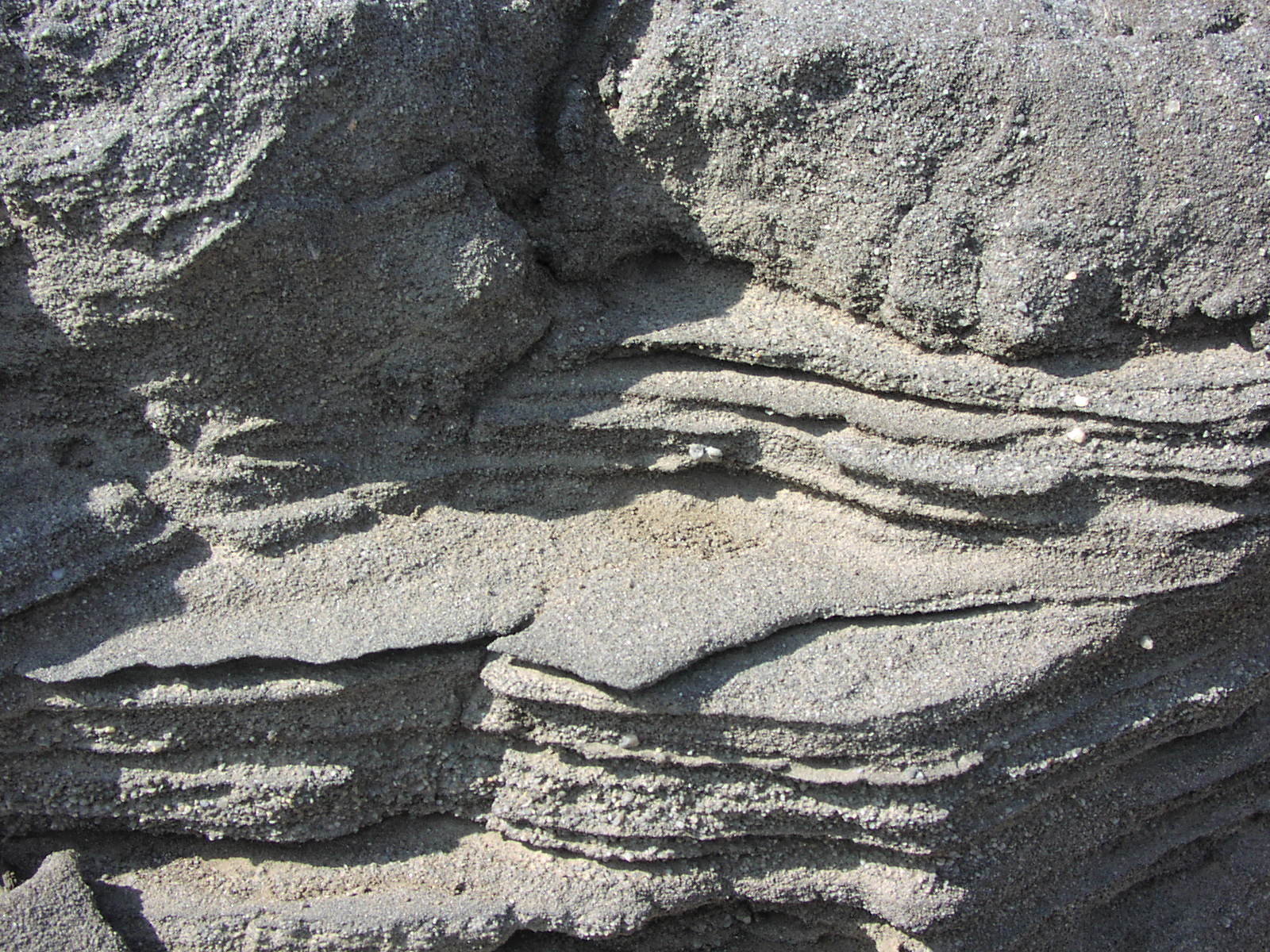
Stratified, congealed crude oil 100 ft (30 m) from the gusher site. The March 2008 image shows an area about 10 in (250 mm) across.

== California Historical Landmark ==
The California Historical Landmark plaque reads:

NO. 485 LAKEVIEW GUSHER 1 - America's most spectacular gusher blew in here on March 14, 1910. Initially 18,000 barrels per day, the flow later reached an uncontrolled peak of 100,000 barrels per day, completely destroying the derrick. This Union Oil Company well produced nine million barrels of oil in 18 months. Marker date of registration August 7, 1951.

== See also ==
- List of oil spills (in reverse chronological order)
- Largest oil spills in history
- California Historical Landmarks in Kern County
- California Historical Landmark
