= Harriet Chalmers Adams =

American explorer, writer and photographer

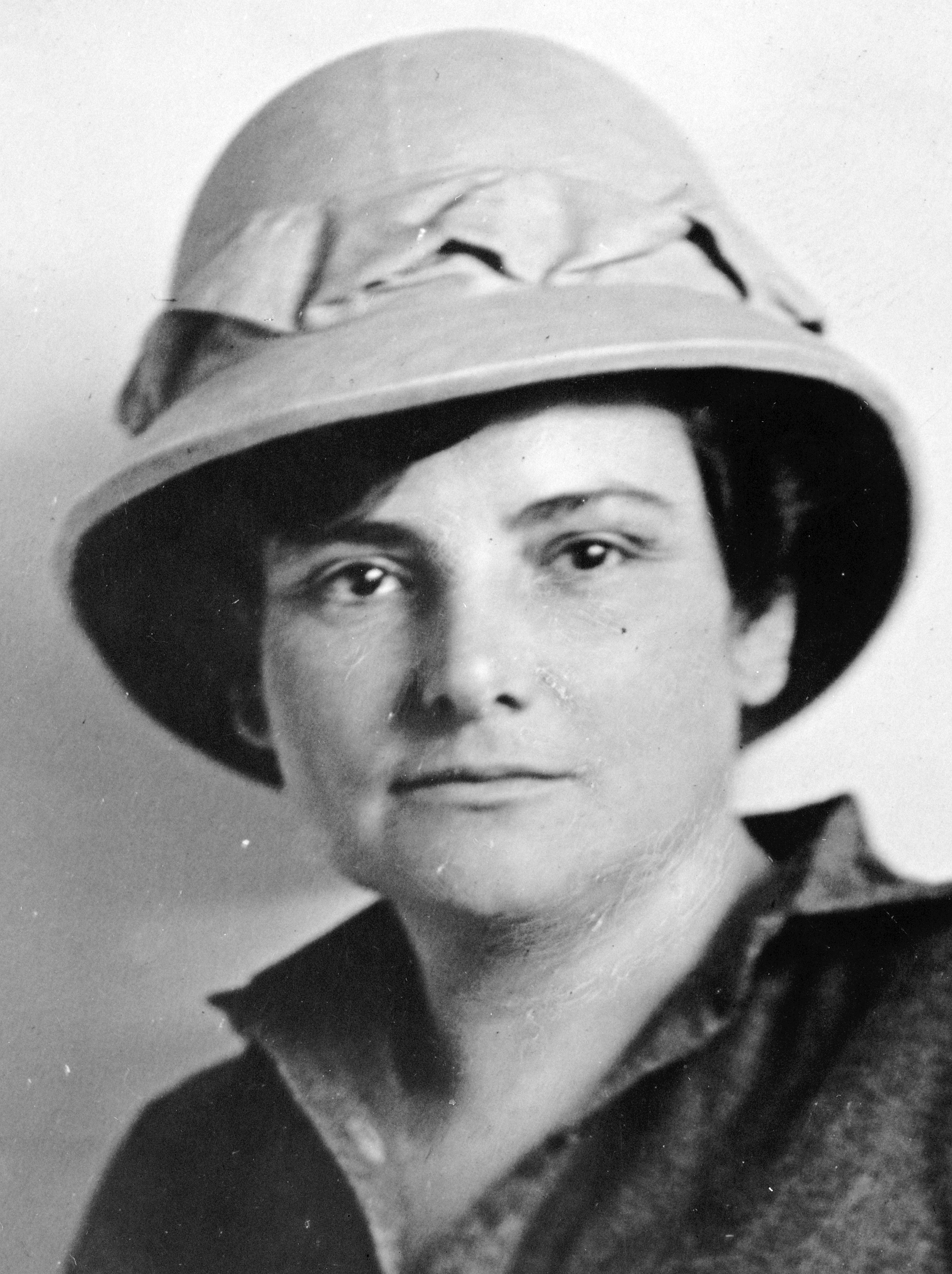
- Born: October 22, 1875; Stockton, California, US
- Died: July 17, 1937 (aged 61); Nice, France
- Resting place: Chapel of the Chimes
- Occupations: Explorer, writer, photographer
- Spouse: Franklin Pierce Adams

Harriet Chalmers Adams (October 22, 1875 – July 17, 1937) was an American explorer, writer and photographer. She traveled extensively in South America, Asia and the South Pacific in the early 20th century, and published accounts of her journeys in National Geographic magazine. She lectured frequently on her travels and illustrated her talks with color slides and movies.

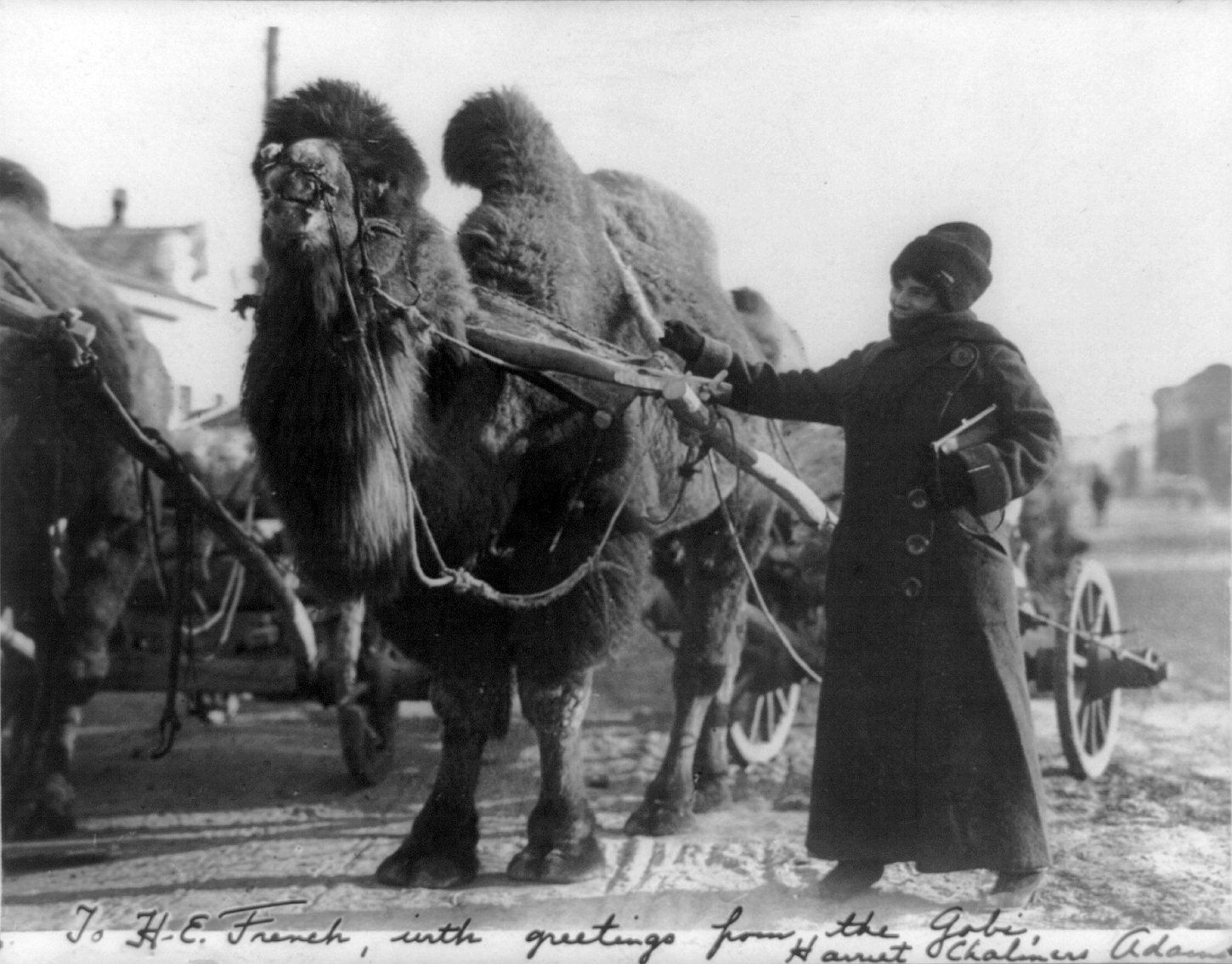
Harriet Chalmers Adams in the Gobi Desert

== Early life and marriage ==
Harriet Chalmers Adams was born in Stockton, California to Alexander Chalmers and Frances Wilkens. Her father was Scottish Canadian and had moved to California to try his hand at mining; her mother was raised in the foothills of the Sierra Nevada. As a child, she enjoyed numerous horseback adventures with her father, including a yearlong trip from Oregon to Mexico through the Sierra Nevada Mountains when she was 14.

On October 5, 1899, she married Franklin Pierce Adams, an electrician. He loved to travel as well, so instead of spending their money on buying a house, they lived in a boarding house and traveled with the money they saved.

== Travels ==
In 1900, Adams went on her first major expedition, a three-year trip around South America with her husband, during which they visited every country, and traversed the Andes on horseback. The New York Times wrote that she "reached twenty frontiers previously unknown to white women." Adams chose practical clothing for her explorations, typically wearing pants, boots, and a man's shirt. During her travels, she focused on the customs, folklore, and languages of the peoples she visited, and lived among them, sharing their sleeping customs and food.

In a 1910 trip, she retraced the trail of Christopher Columbus's early discoveries in the Americas, and crossed Haiti on horseback. In 1915, Adams was prepared to board the RMS Lusitania in New York to sail to Liverpool when she received word that her father was ill. She travelled back west to see him, but was still on the ship's manifest and so was reported as "missing" after the ship was torpedoed and sank.

Adams served as a correspondent for Harper's Magazine in Europe during World War I. She was the only female journalist permitted to visit the trenches.

When she and her husband visited eastern Bolivia during a second extended trip to South America in 1935, she wrote twenty-one articles for the National Geographic Society that featured her photographs, including "Some Wonderful Sights in the Andean Highlands" (September 1908), "Kaleidoscopic La Paz: City of the Clouds" (February 1909) and "River-Encircled Paraguay" (April 1933). She wrote on Trinidad, Surinam, Bolivia, Peru and the trans-Andean railroad between Buenos Aires and Valparaíso.

Although invited to lecture by The Explorers Club, she was not invited to join the group (which remained male-only until 1981). In 1925, Adams helped launch the Society of Woman Geographers to address the issue of "the isolation of women of the exploring species", and served as the society's president until 1933. She later also joined the Royal Geographical Society.

In all, Adams is said to have travelled more than a hundred thousand miles, and captivated hundreds of audiences. The New York Times wrote "Harriet Chalmers Adams is America's greatest woman explorer. As a lecturer no one, man or woman, has a more magnetic hold over an audience than she."

She died in Nice, France, on July 17, 1937, at age 61. An obituary in The Washington Post called her a "confidant of savage head hunters" who never stopped wandering the remote corners of the world. She is interred at the Chapel of the Chimes in Oakland, California.

Of women as adventurers, she wrote

I've wondered why men have so absolutely monopolized the field of exploration. Why did women never go to the Arctic, try for one pole or the other, or invade Africa, Thibet, or unknown wildernesses? I’ve never found my sex a hinderment; never faced a difficulty which a woman, as well as a man, could not surmount; never felt a fear of danger; never lacked courage to protect myself. I’ve been in tight places and have seen harrowing things.

== General references ==
- Anema, Durlynn. Harriet Chalmers Adams: Adventurer and Explorer. Aurora, Colorado: National Writers Press, 2004.
