= Margaret Sibley =

American painter and arts organizer active in Healdsburg, California

Margaret B. "Peggy" Sibley (c. 1906 – May 10, 1987) was an American painter and arts organizer whose work and advocacy helped establish a modern art community in and around Healdsburg, California, in the mid-20th century. Active in Paradise, Red Bluff, Healdsburg and Santa Rosa, she exhibited widely in Northern California and was a founding figure of the Healdsburg Arts group and the Balcony Gallery Co-operative.

== Early life and education ==
Sibley was born in South Africa and raised in New York State. She did not begin to paint seriously until after her children were in school.

In the early 1950s she lived in Paradise, California, where she began studying art at Chico State College (later California State University, Chico). She later recalled that she took nearly all of the studio art courses offered, with the exception of sculpture and printmaking. Her first exhibition was held in the old Paradise post office.

While living in Paradise she designed and built two houses, worked as an interior decorator, and was active as a gardener, describing herself as a self-taught architect and landscape designer.

== Career ==
Sibley began exhibiting in the 1950s. Her early work included realist and expressionist oil paintings; one portrait of a young boy won third prize at the Silver Dollar Fair in 1957, an example of the regional juried shows in which she participated.

After a period in Red Bluff, Sibley and her husband, Robert Sibley, moved to Healdsburg in the early 1960s. Seeking other artists, she placed an advertisement in the local newspaper inviting people interested in forming an art club to contact her. Meetings held in the Sibley living room led to the creation of Healdsburg Arts, an organization which later credited its beginnings to her initiative.

In 1964 Sibley was a prime mover behind the Balcony Gallery Co-operative, an upstairs gallery in the Nervo Building at 415 Healdsburg Avenue, just off the Healdsburg Plaza. As chair of the co-operative, she helped establish a venue where regional artists could exhibit paintings, sculpture and ceramics for sale or rent. The gallery used a jury system, kept shows changing, and offered low-cost rentals intended to make original art accessible to local residents. The Balcony Gallery also organized thematic exhibitions, such as a "Madonna Images" Christmas show in 1964. In 1965 the co-operative closed its Healdsburg premises and merged into the Redwood Empire Art Center in Santa Rosa.

A 1966 profile described Sibley as a "serious modern painter" and noted that she had already held one-woman shows at the California Palace of the Legion of Honor, the Lucien Labaudt Gallery and the Quill Gallery in San Francisco, as well as exhibiting in programs such as the Northern California Annual and the Jack London Square Art Festival. In November and December 1966 she presented a solo exhibition of abstract paintings at the Quay Gallery in Santa Rosa, which local reviewers called a "thought-provoking" show.

Sibley continued to exhibit widely in regional banks, wineries and civic buildings. In 1971 she showed work at the First National Bank in Cloverdale, and in 1976 an exhibition of her paintings and collages was mounted at Rohnert Park City Hall. The latter article noted that she had held one-woman shows at the Palace of the Legion of Honor and the San Francisco Museum of Art (now the San Francisco Museum of Modern Art), and that she had been exhibiting for some 20 years.

Beyond the immediate region, Sibley was a member of the National League of American Pen Women and showed paintings in a Pen Women exhibition at the Smithsonian Institution and in a related traveling show in South America. Her painting Song of the Earth was selected for Daily Bread, an exhibition held in the San Francisco Civic Auditorium and sponsored by Church World Service; the show was accompanied by a filmstrip and teaching materials for churches and schools.

In the late 1970s Sibley presented an exhibition of recent acrylics and collages in the Santa Rosa City Council Chambers, organised by the City of Santa Rosa and the Sonoma County Arts Council. The article reported that she had been "plying her trade" for 25 years and had shown work in many notable exhibitions.

== Artistic style and themes ==
Early in her career Sibley painted realistically, but she later said she had become "bored with complete realism" and moved toward abstraction with "a touch of surrealism". Critics and reporters described her mature paintings as "mood" works built from strong patterns and layered color. San Francisco art critic Alfred Frankenstein praised her oils for their "delicate, thoughtful spirit" and sensitivity to "the rhythms of nature" and "the eloquence of color".

Her subjects ranged from non-objective compositions to series based on walls, stone shrines and natural forms. In the 1970s she painted a number of images inspired by Himalayan obos, recreating stacked-stone shrines using rocks from the Russian River as models. She often quoted Carl Jung's remark that "crystals and flowers are God's thoughts" and said that such ideas informed her work.

Sibley admired Georgia O'Keeffe and cited her as an influence on works such as Portrait of a Leaf. Many of her acrylic paintings of the 1970s, including pieces titled Rocks and January Morning, were described as blending elements of realism and abstraction in pale, delicate tonalities.

=== Complexity Series ===
In the late 1970s Sibley developed a body of collage work she called the Complexity Series. Working painstakingly from photographs and reproductions in her collection of art journals, she cut images into vertical or horizontal strips and interspersed them with fragments from other sources. The resulting collages fused divergent forms, colours and concepts into what one reviewer called "complex accordion images sliding and diverging harmoniously along the picture plane, flickering and elusive". More than sixty of these acrylics and collages were included in her 1978 exhibition at the Santa Rosa City Council Chambers.

== Advocacy and community work ==
Sibley saw the artist as a "functioning member of society" rather than an isolated figure and argued that artists had a responsibility to their communities. Through Healdsburg Arts and the Balcony Gallery Co-operative she helped organize lectures, demonstrations and rental schemes intended to broaden local exposure to contemporary art. Each month the Balcony Gallery presented themed exhibitions and kept its doors open for visitors to browse "without high-pressure salesmanship".

She also gave talks and demonstrations for civic groups such as the Healdsburg Garden Club, and in a 1967 interview remarked that "it is important to be creative—much more important than waging war", linking her art-making to wider hopes for peace.

== Legacy ==
By the late 1980s Healdsburg Arts mounted a posthumous exhibition of Sibley's paintings and publicly stated that the organization "owed its beginnings" to her early efforts. Local writers and historians have since regarded her as a key figure in the development of modern art in Healdsburg and as one of the women artists who helped accustom small-town audiences to contemporary work.

Photographs and exhibition records in the collections of the Healdsburg Museum and Historical Society document Sibley's roles as a painter, lecturer and co-operative gallery chair in the 1960s and 1970s.

== See also ==
- Healdsburg, California
- California modernism
- National League of American Pen Women
