= Stewarts Point, Nevada =

Unincorporated community in Nevada, US

- Unincorporated community
- Location within the state of Nevada Stewarts Point, Nevada (the United States)
- Coordinates: 36°22′50″N 114°24′28″W
- Country: United States
- State: Nevada
- County: Clark
- Elevation: 1,280 ft (390 m)
- Time zone: UTC-8 (Pacific (PST))
  - Summer (DST): UTC-7 (PDT)
- GNIS feature ID: 849314

Stewarts Point is an unincorporated community in southeast Nevada, just about 30 miles (48 km) east of Las Vegas. It is located in Clark County.
