= Kellogg, California =

Unincorporated community in California, United States

- Unincorporated community
- Location within California Location within the United States
- Coordinates: 38°37′56″N 122°40′26″W
- Country: United States
- State: California
- County: Sonoma
- Elevation: 522 ft (159 m)
- Time zone: UTC-8 (Pacific (PST))
  - Summer (DST): UTC-7 (PDT)
- Area code: 707
- GNIS feature ID: 1658889

Kellogg was a historical unincorporated community in Sonoma County, California, United States. Originally a summer resort, it was located at the foot of Mount Saint Helena, approximately seven miles northwest of Calistoga. The main hotel in 1880 was said to be made of adobe, with ten adjoining cottages with a total capacity of 125 guests. By 1892, the resort site had become a private residence.

Kellogg was located along California State Route 128 near where Kellogg Creek and Yellowjacket Creek merge to form Redwood Creek.
