= Herbert A. Richardson =

American timber baron and shipping magnate

Herbert Archer "H.A." Richardson (February 1852 – 19 April 1942) was a timber baron, shipping magnate, and pioneer of Sonoma County, California.

== Biography ==
Richardson was born in Lisbon, New Hampshire. He arrived in Stewarts Point, the first week of April 1876, with his new bride and some pocket change. His storied career in the Timber and Shipping industries, hailed him the "Tie King of the Coast", amassing extensive holdings including lumber mills, timber camps, the Richardson company shipping line, and the Stewarts Point Store and inn. His brother, Harvey G Richardson, also came west to find success in the timber industry.

== Stewarts Point ==
Richardson bought the Stewarts Point property in 1881. The property supported his family's business venture, allowing them to ship their timber from the chutes in Fisherman's Bay. He used his ship lines for transport for over 40 years, until the coast roads were built and trucks replaced water shipment in 1925. Under H.A.'s ownership, Stewarts Point developed into a small community with 30 buildings including a store, hotel, post office, and blacksmith shop.

== Timber Baron and Shipping Magnate ==
Richardson owned and operated, the Richardson Shipping line which consisted of ten steamships and sailing vessels that he used to shipped goods to San Francisco that were produced on the north coast including posts, railroad ties, tan bark, fencing, cordwood, and shingles; alongside farm and dairy products. In 1894, H.A. started construction on a saw mill that could process 30,000 board feet of timber per day.

During World War I, Richardson fulfilled a government contract for one million Railroad Ties, and also lent his steamships to the government for use.

== Personal life ==
Richardson was married to Althea Ella Ball. They had three children, Grace Belle Richardson, Archer Herbert Richardson, and Fontaine Richardson. The couple lived in San Francisco, and maintained their property and business holdings in Stewarts Point. He was the son of David Sutherland Richardson and Julia Whiting Richardson. When he was not working, Richardson enjoyed swimming, camping, hunting and fishing with his sons along the Gualala River. He was a brother to Harvey G Richardson.
