= Healdsburg Memorial Bridge =

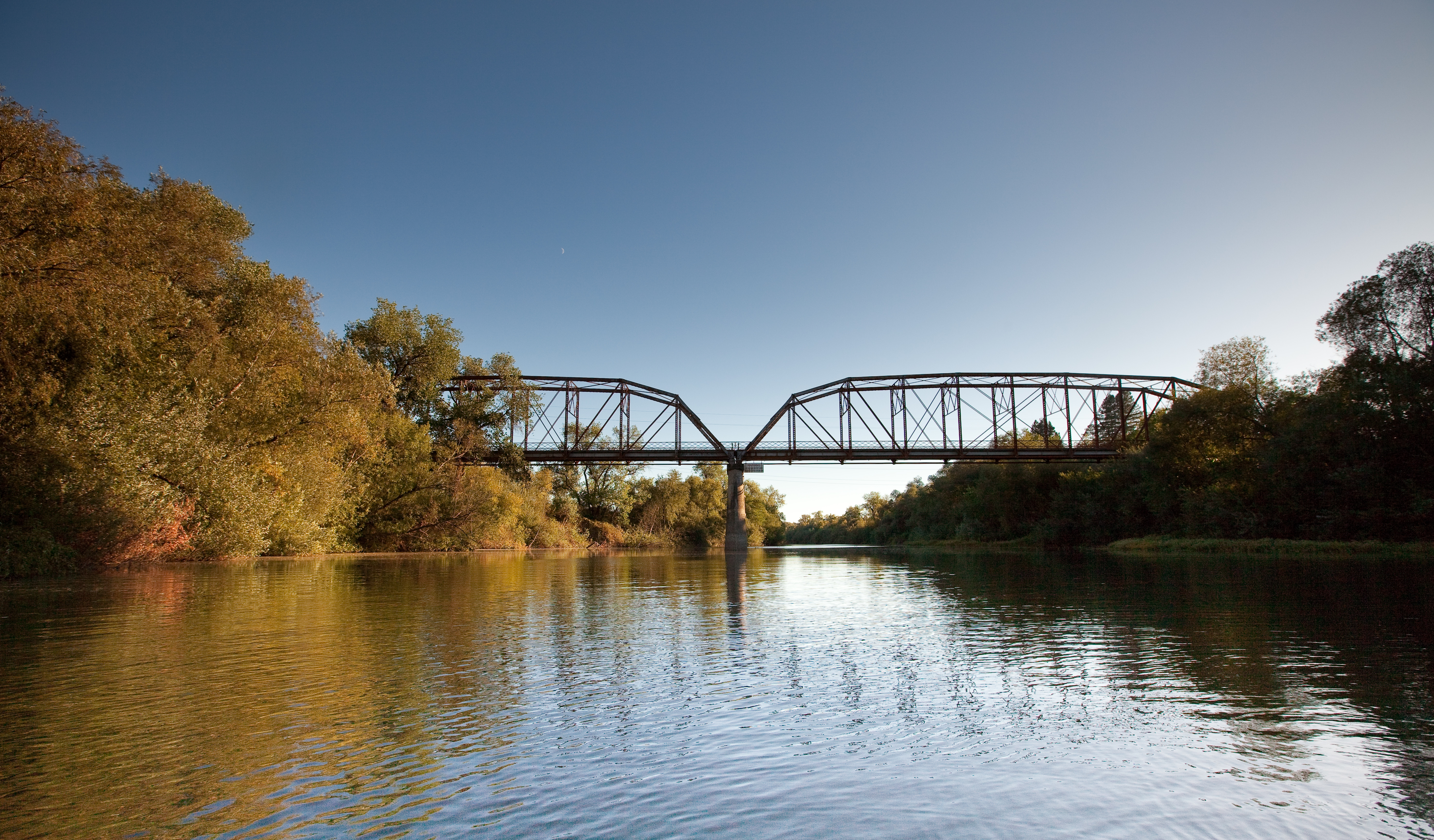
- Healdsburg Memorial Bridge in September 2009
- Coordinates: 38.604°N 122.860°W
- Carries: auto, pedestrian and bicycle traffic
- Crosses: Russian River
- Locale: Healdsburg, California

Characteristics
- Total length: 438 feet (134 m)
- Width: 19.4 feet (5.9 m)
- Longest span: 198 feet (60 m)
- No. of spans: 2
- Clearance above: 14.9 feet (4.5 m)

History
- Constructed by: American Bridge Company
- Opened: 1921

Statistics
- Daily traffic: 7400 vehicles/day

Location
- Interactive map of Healdsburg Memorial Bridge

The Healdsburg Memorial Bridge is a steel truss bridge across the Russian River in Healdsburg, California, listed in the National Register of Historic Places. It can be seen from nearby U.S. Route 101 and is "Healdsburg's abiding structural symbol".

== Description ==
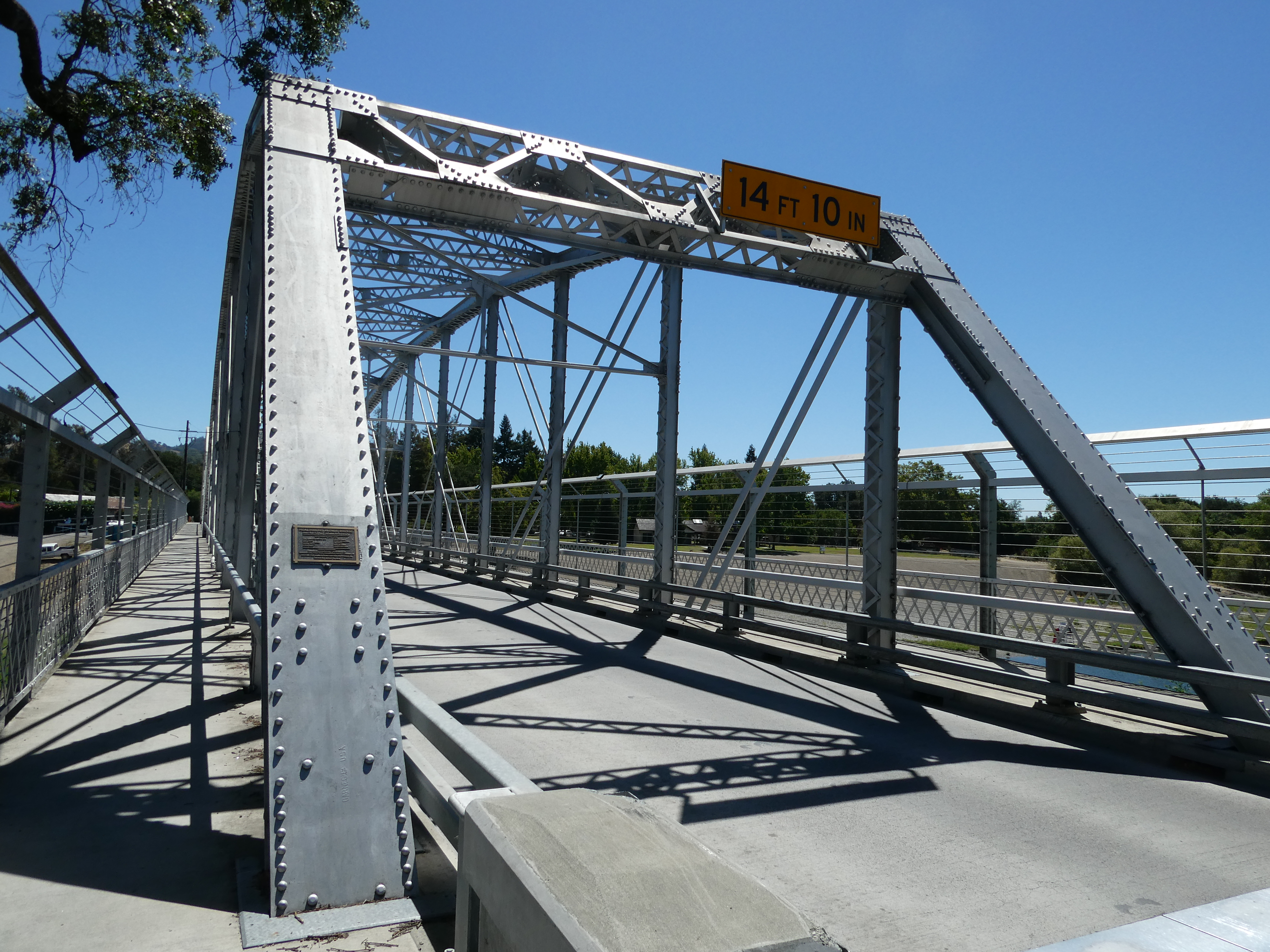
The west end of the bridge

The Healdsburg Memorial Bridge is a Pennsylvania (Petit) truss bridge. This once-popular design, named for the Pennsylvania Railroad, has since fallen out of favor. The Healdsburg bridge is one of only two bridges of this design still carrying vehicle traffic in California, and one of only 13 in the United States. The bridge has two truss spans, each with ten panels.

The entire bridge is 438 feet (134 m) long; the longer of its two spans is 198 feet (60 m) long. Its deck is 19.4 feet (5.9 m) wide, with a vertical clearance of 14.9 feet (4.5 m); because its narrow deck does not meet modern safety standards, it is classified as functionally obsolete.

The bridge carries 7,400 vehicles per day on Healdsburg Avenue (a local road in Healdsburg) as well as pedestrian and bicycle traffic. The east end of the bridge lies in Healdsburg Veterans Memorial Beach Park; another truss bridge carrying the former Northwestern Pacific Railroad crosses the river nearby to the north and also ends within the same park.

== History ==
The point on the river now used by the bridge was used as a ford by settlers to Sonoma County since the 1850s. The memorial bridge was built in 1921 by the American Bridge Company to carry the historic Redwood Highway; when built it was the only steel bridge across the Russian River. At that time an annual temporary dam built downriver from the bridge created a swimming area; the same part of the river still remains popular for swimming.

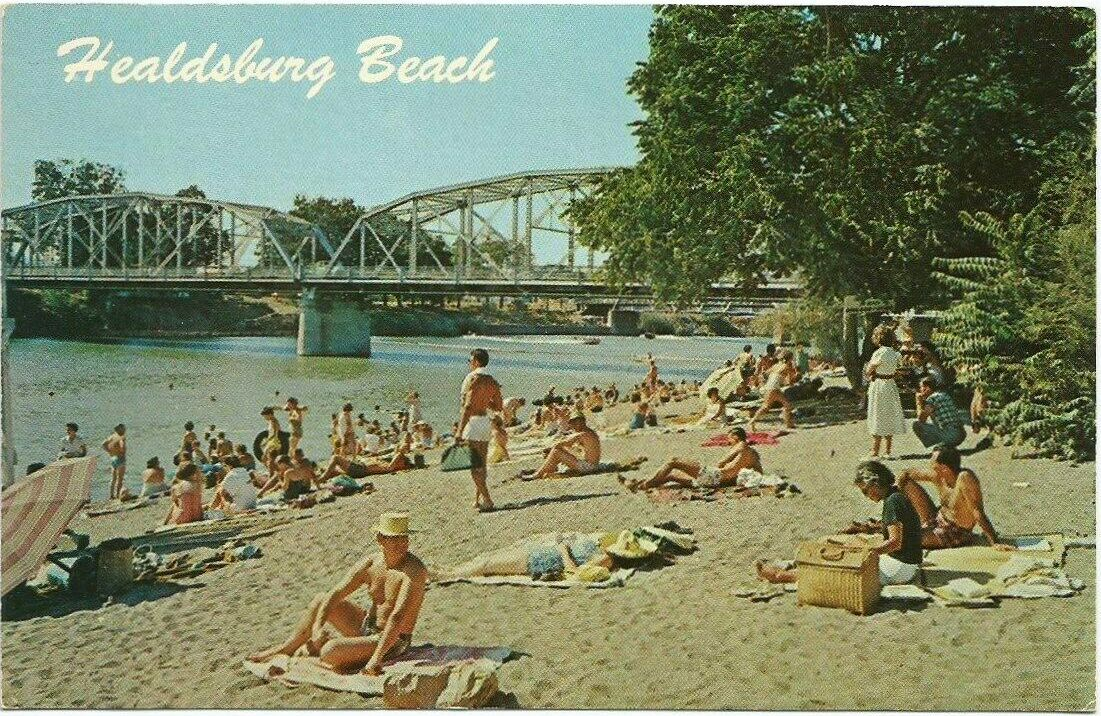
1950s postcard showing the bridge

When U.S. Route 101 was built, on a new alignment crossing the river farther to the west, most of the traffic formerly carried by the memorial bridge was diverted. The original bridge design included decorative lights, which were removed in the 1950s.

A structural report in 1979 showed the bridge as being near collapse. The land containing the bridge was annexed by Healdsburg in 1980. In 1985, the bridge was declared eligible for the National Register of Historic Places, despite which the Healdsburg city government began planning to replace it in 1990. After negative reaction from the community, no action was taken. In 2000 the city again made plans for the bridge, involving a seismic retrofit. In 2007, errors in the 1979 report were discovered, and a new report in 2008 showed that the bridge remained structurally sound. It was officially listed on the National Register of Historic Places in April 2011, and in December 2011, state and federal funding for restoration was approved, contingent on the city providing funds for ongoing maintenance of the bridge.

The retrofitting and restoration was completed in 2015. The work involved construction of a new mid-river pier, installation of isolation bearings, reinforcement of truss members, and replacement of the deck.

== See also ==
- List of bridges documented by the Historic American Engineering Record in California
