= Stewarts Point, California =

Unincorporated community in California, United States

Stewarts, California
- Unincorporated community
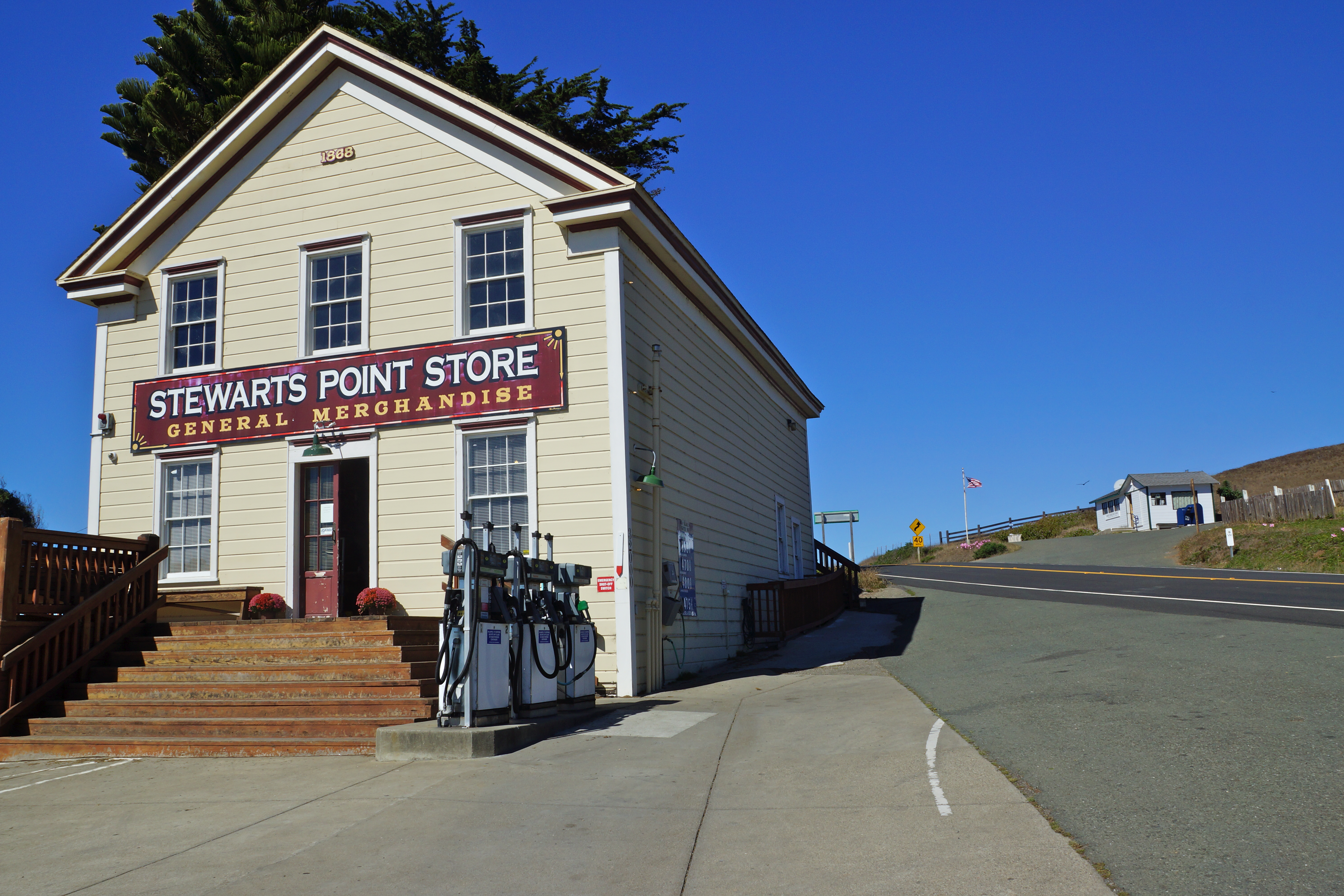
- General Store

- Location within California Location within the United States
- Coordinates: 38°39′07″N 123°23′57″W
- Country: United States
- State: California
- County: Sonoma
- Elevation: 108 ft (33 m)
- Time zone: UTC-8 (Pacific (PST))
  - Summer (DST): UTC-7 (PDT)
- ZIP code: 95480
- Area code: 707
- GNIS feature ID: 252807

Stewarts Point is an unincorporated community in Sonoma County, California, United States and part of the historic Salt Point Township. Stewarts Point is located on the Pacific coast and California State Route 1, 20 miles (32 km) west of Healdsburg. Stewarts Point was originally part of the German Rancho, and was purchased by William Bihler in 1852. The unincorporated area is named for the first residents, the Stewart family, who moved to the area in 1856. In the official history for the United States Post Office, the name was said to have been given by Lt. Col. S. Stewart in 1888; however, newspaper archives refer to the area as Stewarts Point as early as 1867, and attribute the name to the Stewart family, who were the first residents in the area.

Stewarts Point and the adjacent Fisherman Bay have a long and important history to the indigenous Pomo people, Kashia Band of Pomo Indians of the Stewarts Point Rancheria, who have lived in the area for millennia. The large sheltered cove fed by a small creek offered access to the area's bountiful marine and coastal resources. The topographic advantages of this location were equally recognized by Euro-American settlers, who set out from San Francisco to take advantage of the coastal redwood forest. John and Andrew Fisk built the first landing at Stewarts Point in 1867. By 1877, three lumber chutes shipped out products from nearby mills.

The community was, and remains, an important part of California's timber industry, shipping ports, railroads, lumber mills, and tie camps operated out of the settlement.

== Murder of Lina Davenport (L.D.) Helm ==
In late 1860, two brothers, L. Davenport and Turner Harmon Helm, laid claim on land in Stewarts Point by squatting on a claim that belonged to Michael T. McClellan. The Helm brothers were part of the outlaw Helm Clan and cousins to the infamous Boone Helm, aka The Kentucky Cannibal. Boone was an outlaw who caused mayhem throughout the west and after a warrant for his arrest was issued, he was sheltered in the mountains behind Stewart's Point by his cousins. L. Davenport and Turner along with their brothers James, Daunt (John), Weid (William Johnson), and Chat (Chatham E.) had arrived in California during the Gold Rush. The other brothers headed to Southern California, and Turner and L. Davenport arrived in Stewarts Point. After an argument with Sarah Stewart, Samuel's wife, Thomas Stewart, her son, killed Davenport. After a five-year trial, Thomas was sentenced to life in prison. The Stewart family eventually migrated North and settled first in Point Arena, and then Fort Bragg. Turner Helm migrated to Southern California to join up with his brothers in the Borrego Springs area. Boone Helm migrated up through Oregon and into Montana, where he was hanged. L. Davenport Helm was the first person to be buried in the Stewart's Point Cemetery, at the base of the lone tree in the cemetery.

== Stewarts Point Hotel ==
The Stewarts Point Hotel, adjacent to the present day Stewarts Point Store, was the second hotel built in the Salt Point Township. Brothers John Colt Fisk and Andrew Fisk built the hotel between 1870 and 1872. This is the only hotel that was built on the Sonoma Coast in the 1800s that is still standing today. The hotel closed in 1925, and has remained a private residence since then.

== Stewarts Point School ==
The Stewarts Point School District, along with the Salt Point School District, were the original school districts in the township. The schoolhouse south of the Stewarts Point store was built in the 1880s. There was another building behind the store that served as a schoolhouse prior to the one built in the 1880s located north of the Stewarts Point Store.

== Notable people ==
- Grace Richardson Butterfield, California Worthy Grand Matron - Order of Eastern Star & Member, California State Parks Commission
- Herbert Archer Richardson, California pioneer, Timber Baron, Shipping Magnate
