= Healdsburg, California =

Town in Sonoma County, California, US

- City
- Healdsburg Plaza
- Interactive map of Healdsburg, California
- Location in California Location in the United States
- Coordinates: 38°37′3″N 122°51′59″W
- Country: United States
- State: California
- County: Sonoma
- Founded: 1857
- Incorporated: February 20, 1867
- Founder: Harmon Heald

Government
  - Type: Council–manager
  - Mayor: Evelyn Mitchell
  - Vice mayor: Chris Herrod

Area
  - Total: 4.42 sq mi (11.45 km^{2})
  - Land: 4.42 sq mi (11.45 km^{2})
  - Water: 0 sq mi (0.00 km^{2}) 0%
- Elevation: 105 ft (32 m)

Population (2020)
  - Total: 11,340
  - Estimate (2025): 11,172
  - Density: 2,565/sq mi (990.4/km^{2})
- Demonym: Healdsburgians
- Time zone: UTC-8 (Pacific)
  - Summer (DST): UTC-7 (PDT)
- ZIP code: 95448
- Area code: 707, 369
- FIPS code: 06-33056
- GNIS feature IDs: 277530, 2410726
- Website: cityofhealdsburg.net

Healdsburg is a city in Sonoma County, in the North Bay region of California. It lies on the Russian River where three American Viticultural Areas meet: Alexander Valley, Dry Creek Valley and Russian River Valley. The population was 11,340 at the 2020 census.

Harmon Heald founded the town in 1857 on part of the former Rancho Sotoyome, laying out a central plaza that became the core of downtown. It was incorporated in 1867, and the railroad arrived in 1872. For much of the 20th century Healdsburg's economy rested on prunes and other orchard crops; since the 1970s vineyards have replaced the orchards, and the city's economy now depends heavily on wine and tourism.

== History ==
=== Indigenous peoples and Rancho Sotoyome ===
For thousands of years before European settlement, Western Wappo and Southern Pomo-speaking peoples lived in the area. The Pomo built villages in open areas along the Russian River, including the town of qʰalle. In 1841 Captain Henry D. Fitch, a brother-in-law of Mariano Guadalupe Vallejo, claimed the land as part of the 48,880 acres (19,780 ha) Rancho Sotoyome. After Mexico ceded California to the United States in 1848, title to the grant was disputed.

=== Founding and incorporation ===
The madrone tree at the northwest corner of Healdsburg Plaza, c. 1864–1873

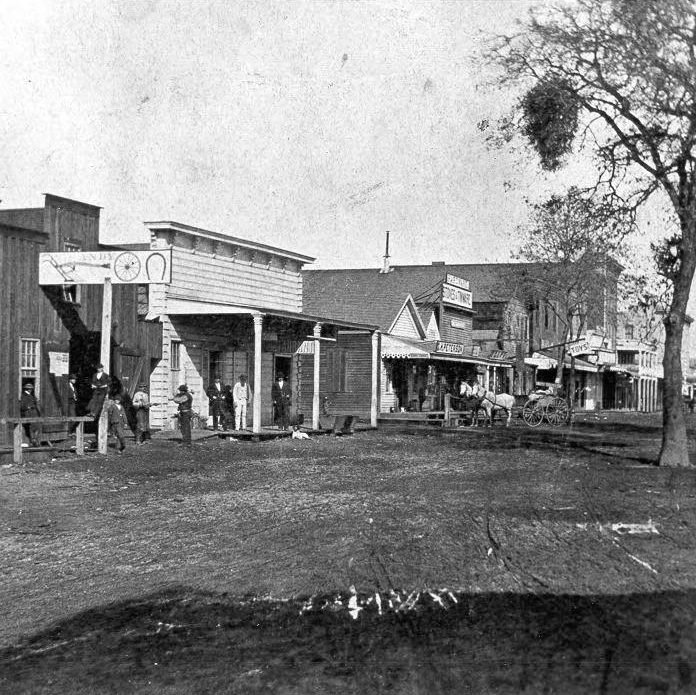
Healdsburg, 1872

The California Gold Rush drew settlers to the region, and some turned to farming instead of mining. In 1851 Harmon Heald built a cabin on the route between San Francisco and the northern mines, along what is now Healdsburg Avenue, and by 1854 he was running a store with a post office. In 1857 Heald, who had been squatting on Rancho Sotoyome since 1850, purchased part of the rancho, the city's official founding date. That year he had a surveyor lay out a central plaza, streets and 85 lots. He donated land for a park, a school, a cemetery and churches, and sold the remaining lots for $15 each. The town then had about 300 residents. In 1858 its post office was renamed from Russian River to Healdsburg. Healdsburg was incorporated in 1867, with Lewis A. Norton as its first mayor.

=== Railroad and agriculture ===
Panoramic map of Healdsburg from 1876 with images of several area sites inset

The San Francisco and North Pacific Railroad reached Healdsburg in 1871 and was extended north to Cloverdale in 1872, opening new markets for local produce. Passenger trains also brought a seasonal stream of vacationers to the Russian River. By the 1880s grapes, lumber and hops were the region's main sources of income besides tourism, and sawmills, canneries and packing houses were central to the local economy. By the turn of the 20th century, Healdsburg's main crops were hops, grapes and prunes.

A Seventh-day Adventist congregation built its first church in Healdsburg in 1871. In 1877 James and Ellen G. White, founders of the Seventh-day Adventist Church, bought a ranch on West Dry Creek Road near the town. James White died in 1881, and the following year Ellen White bought a house on Powell Avenue, which remained her West Coast home until she left for Australia in 1891. In 1882 Adventists opened Healdsburg Academy, later Healdsburg College, on Plaza Street. The school closed in 1908 amid debt, and its successor reopened in Angwin in 1909, becoming Pacific Union College.

=== Prohibition and the prune era ===
Prohibition, enacted through the Volstead Act in 1919, collapsed the local wine industry, and during the 1920s most vineyards were replaced with fruit trees, especially prunes and apples. In 1929 the city's slogan was "Healdsburg: the Buckle of the Prune Belt." By 1930 prunes were the town's most important industry, and they remained its largest cash crop until the 1970s.

=== Postwar growth and the wine economy ===
U.S. 101 reached Healdsburg in 1964. The population more than doubled between 1950 and 1980, from 3,258 to 7,217. In 1978 the council chose Abel de Luna as mayor, the city's first Latino mayor. During the 1970s many orchards were replanted as vineyards, and by the mid-1980s nearly all the prune orchards were gone. Wine became the area's main agricultural industry, and Healdsburg changed from a farm town into a wine country destination, with restaurants, tasting rooms, galleries and shops around the plaza.

== Geography ==
The city has a total area of 4.420 sq mi (11.4 km^{2}), all land. It lies on the Russian River, near a point used as a crossing of the river since the 1850s that is now the site of the Healdsburg Memorial Bridge.

Foss Creek traverses the city from north to south, flowing into Dry Creek near the U.S. 101 Central Healdsburg interchange.

The Healdsburg Fault, a northern continuation of the Rodgers Creek Fault system, runs north and east of the city. It produced the magnitude 5.6 and 5.7 1969 Santa Rosa earthquakes.

=== Climate ===
Healdsburg has cool, wet winters and warm to hot, dry summers. In January, the average high temperature is 57.6 °F (14.2 °C) and the average low is 38 °F (3 °C). In July, the average high temperature is 88.8 °F (31.6 °C) and the average low is 52.7 °F (11.5 °C). There are an average of 54.6 days with highs of 90 °F (32 °C) or higher and an average of 20.1 days with lows of 32 °F (0 °C) or lower. The record high temperature was 117 °F (47 °C) on September 6, 2022, and the record low temperature was 14 °F (−10 °C) on December 22, 1990.

Annual precipitation averages 42.2 in (1,070 mm). There are an average of 73 days annually with measurable precipitation. The wettest year was 1983 with 96.25 in (2,445 mm) and the driest year was 1976 with 13.67 in (347 mm). The most precipitation in one month was 29.9 in (760 mm) in January 1995. The most precipitation in 24 hours was 8.18 in (208 mm) on December 3, 1980. Snow is relatively rare, with none in most years. The highest yearly snowfall totaled 0.8 in (20 mm) in 1976.

Climate data for Healdsburg, California (1991–2020 normals, extremes 1897–present)
Month	Jan	Feb	Mar	Apr	May	Jun	Jul	Aug	Sep	Oct	Nov	Dec	Year
Record high °F (°C)	85 (29)	88 (31)	95 (35)	102 (39)	108 (42)	116 (47)	116 (47)	114 (46)	117 (47)	108 (42)	98 (37)	83 (28)	117 (47)
Mean maximum °F (°C)	68.3 (20.2)	73.0 (22.8)	80.0 (26.7)	89.1 (31.7)	95.3 (35.2)	101.7 (38.7)	103.3 (39.6)	103.2 (39.6)	99.8 (37.7)	91.6 (33.1)	77.9 (25.5)	68.4 (20.2)	106.4 (41.3)
Mean daily maximum °F (°C)	57.7 (14.3)	61.5 (16.4)	66.0 (18.9)	72.1 (22.3)	79.0 (26.1)	85.8 (29.9)	88.7 (31.5)	88.3 (31.3)	84.6 (29.2)	76.9 (24.9)	64.9 (18.3)	57.3 (14.1)	73.6 (23.1)
Daily mean °F (°C)	48.5 (9.2)	51.3 (10.7)	54.4 (12.4)	58.6 (14.8)	64.3 (17.9)	69.7 (20.9)	71.5 (21.9)	71.0 (21.7)	68.5 (20.3)	62.7 (17.1)	53.8 (12.1)	48.0 (8.9)	60.2 (15.7)
Mean daily minimum °F (°C)	39.3 (4.1)	41.0 (5.0)	42.7 (5.9)	45.1 (7.3)	49.5 (9.7)	53.7 (12.1)	54.3 (12.4)	53.7 (12.1)	52.3 (11.3)	48.5 (9.2)	42.7 (5.9)	38.7 (3.7)	46.8 (8.2)
Mean minimum °F (°C)	29.6 (−1.3)	31.7 (−0.2)	33.9 (1.1)	36.8 (2.7)	42.6 (5.9)	45.6 (7.6)	48.6 (9.2)	47.4 (8.6)	44.3 (6.8)	39.2 (4.0)	32.3 (0.2)	29.0 (−1.7)	27.0 (−2.8)
Record low °F (°C)	18 (−8)	21 (−6)	27 (−3)	24 (−4)	30 (−1)	32 (0)	31 (−1)	33 (1)	30 (−1)	26 (−3)	25 (−4)	14 (−10)	14 (−10)
Average precipitation inches (mm)	8.00 (203)	8.33 (212)	6.35 (161)	2.87 (73)	1.60 (41)	0.35 (8.9)	0.00 (0.00)	0.04 (1.0)	0.10 (2.5)	2.20 (56)	4.46 (113)	8.51 (216)	42.81 (1,087)
Average precipitation days (≥ 0.01 in)	14.0	12.2	11.6	7.5	4.7	1.0	0.1	0.2	0.9	3.5	8.1	13.3	77.1
Source 1: NOAA
Source 2: NOAA

=== Parks and open space ===
The gazebo in Healdsburg Plaza

An intrinsic element of the city's natural environment is the riparian zone associated with the Russian River that flows through Healdsburg. The city owns two open space preserves stewarded by LandPaths: the 150 acres (61 ha) Healdsburg Ridge Open Space Preserve, with wetlands, oak woodland, chaparral and grassland, and the 173 acres (70 ha) Fitch Mountain Open Space Preserve.

== Demographics ==
Historical population
Census	Pop.	Note	%±
1860	334		—
1870	959		187.1%
1880	1,133		18.1%
1890	1,485		31.1%
1900	1,869		25.9%
1910	2,011		7.6%
1920	2,412		19.9%
1930	2,296		−4.8%
1940	2,507		9.2%
1950	3,258		30.0%
1960	4,816		47.8%
1970	5,438		12.9%
1980	7,217		32.7%
1990	9,469		31.2%
2000	10,722		13.2%
2010	11,254		5.0%
2020	11,340		0.8%
2025 (est.)	11,172	▼	−1.5%
U.S. Decennial Census; 1860–1870 1880-1890; 1900 1910 1920; 1930 1940 1950; 1960 1970 1980; 1990 2000 2010; 2020

=== Racial and ethnic composition ===
Race and Ethnicity
Racial and ethnic composition	2000	2010	2020
White (non-Hispanic)	67.76%	62.54%	58.51%
Hispanic or Latino (of any race)	28.82%	33.94%	34.61%
Two or more races (non-Hispanic)	1.48%	1.32%	3.83%
Asian (non-Hispanic)	0.62%	1.0%	1.45%
Other (non-Hispanic)	0.08%	0.15%	0.53%
Native American (non-Hispanic)	0.88%	0.59%	0.52%
Black or African American (non-Hispanic)	0.33%	0.38%	0.45%
Pacific Islander (non-Hispanic)	0.03%	0.09%	0.11%

=== 2020 census ===
As of the 2020 census, Healdsburg had a population of 11,340. The population density was 2,565.6 inhabitants per square mile (990.6/km^{2}). The racial makeup of Healdsburg was 63.4% White, 0.6% African American, 2.0% Native American, 1.5% Asian, 0.1% Pacific Islander, 18.3% from other races, and 14.1% from two or more races. Hispanic or Latino of any race were 34.6% of the population.

The census reported that 99.3% of the population lived in households, 25 people (0.2%) lived in non-institutionalized group quarters, and 54 people (0.5%) were institutionalized.

99.9% of residents lived in urban areas, while 0.1% lived in rural areas.

There were 4,519 households, out of which 27.4% included children under the age of 18, 49.3% were married-couple households, 7.1% were cohabiting couple households, 28.0% had a female householder with no partner present, and 15.6% had a male householder with no partner present. 26.6% of households were one person, and 14.7% were one person aged 65 or older. The average household size was 2.49. There were 2,955 families (65.4% of all households).

The age distribution was 19.0% under the age of 18, 7.1% aged 18 to 24, 23.3% aged 25 to 44, 27.1% aged 45 to 64, and 23.4% who were 65 years of age or older. The median age was 45.4 years. For every 100 females, there were 94.7 males, and for every 100 females age 18 and over there were 92.5 males.

There were 5,051 housing units at an average density of 1,142.8 units per square mile (441.2 units/km^{2}), of which 4,519 (89.5%) were occupied and 10.5% were vacant. Of occupied units, 58.0% were owner-occupied, and 42.0% were occupied by renters. The homeowner vacancy rate was 1.5%; the rental vacancy rate was 4.0%.

=== 2023 ACS 5-year estimates ===
In 2023, the US Census Bureau estimated that 18.5% of the population were foreign-born. Of all people aged 5 or older, 71.7% spoke only English at home, 25.8% spoke Spanish, 1.8% spoke other Indo-European languages, 0.6% spoke Asian or Pacific Islander languages, and 0.1% spoke other languages. Of those aged 25 or older, 85.7% were high school graduates and 39.5% had a bachelor's degree.

The median household income in 2023 was $100,082, and the per capita income was $60,189. About 7.1% of families and 11.3% of the population were below the poverty line.

=== 2010 census ===
At the 2010 census, Healdsburg had a population of 11,254 in 4,378 households, with a median age of 40.8 years. Hispanic or Latino residents of any race made up 33.9% of the population.

== Economy ==
Healdsburg's economy depends heavily on wine and tourism. The city lies where the Alexander Valley, Dry Creek Valley and Russian River Valley wine regions meet.

The city levies a 14 percent transient occupancy tax on hotel stays. Ten points of it fund parks, recreation and open space; two fund public safety; and two fund affordable housing. In 2012 the City Council approved the Healdsburg Tourism Improvement District, under which the city's lodging businesses add a 2 percent charge to room rates to support the local tourism industry.

Hotel growth has been a recurring local issue. In 2017 the city had about 425 hotel rooms, with roughly 430 more planned, and a residents' group sought limits on new hotels in the downtown plaza district.

The first commercial development of the seasoning lemon pepper was in Healdsburg in 1967.

SingleThread, a restaurant, inn and farm opened in 2016 by chef Kyle Connaughton and Katina Connaughton, received three Michelin stars in 2019.

== Arts and culture ==
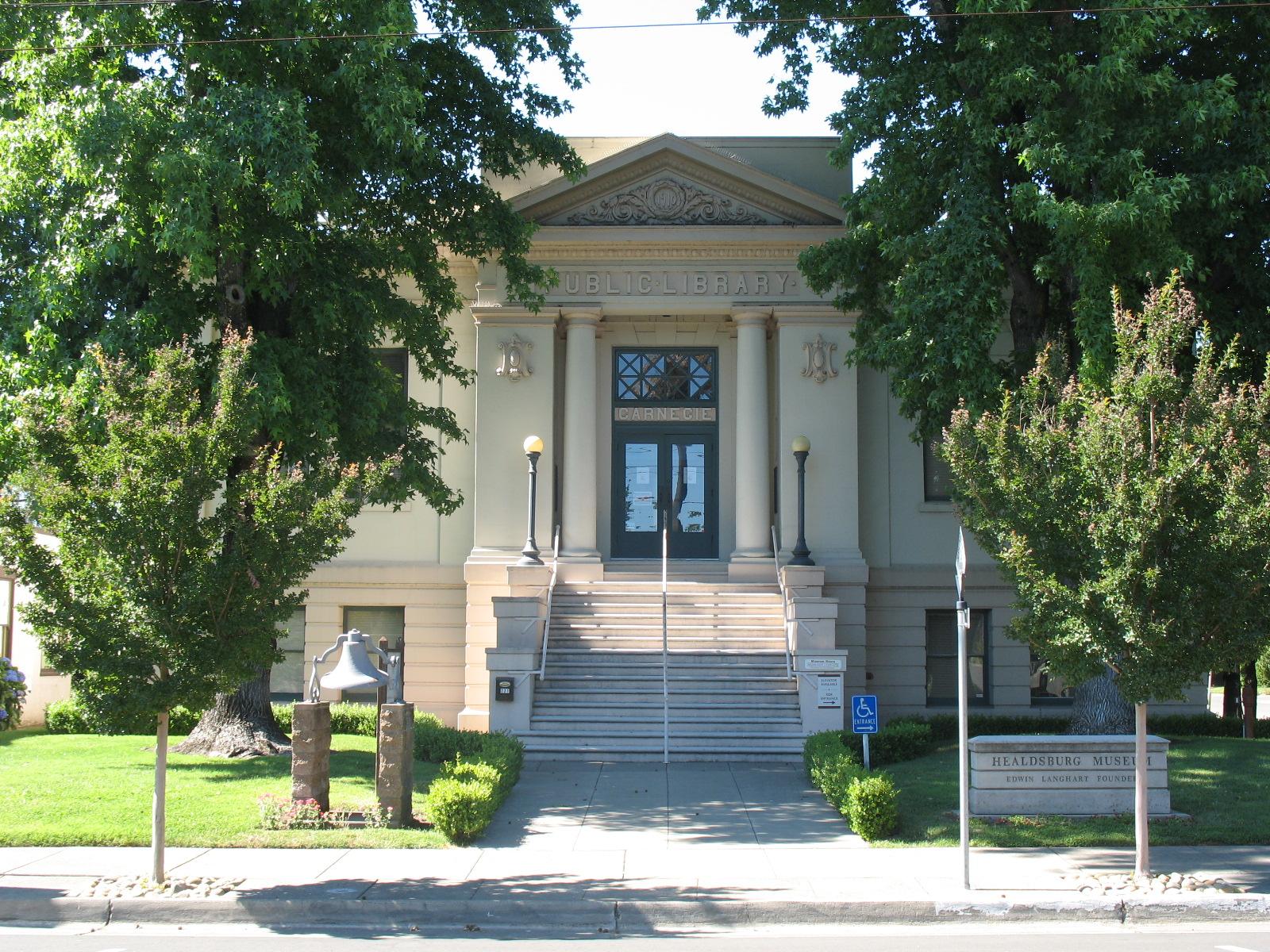
The Healdsburg Carnegie Library, home of the Healdsburg Museum

The Healdsburg Carnegie Library, home of the Healdsburg Museum, is listed on the National Register of Historic Places, as is the Healdsburg Memorial Bridge. A Cultural Resource Survey conducted in 1983 catalogued over 300 historic resources in the city. The city has designated eleven historic landmarks in Healdsburg and two locally designated Historic Districts which include the Johnson Street Historic District and the Matheson Historic District.

=== Sports and events ===
The Healdsburg Prune Packers, a collegiate summer baseball team organized in 1921, play at Recreation Park. The Fitch Mountain Footrace, first run around Fitch Mountain in 1927, is now a 10K.

=== In film ===
The 1943 film Happy Land, and 1996 film Scream, were filmed in and around Healdsburg.

The 1981 television film Bitter Harvest was partly filmed in Healdsburg.

Part of the Mexican film Pelea de perros, starring Julio Alemán, was filmed in and around Healdsburg in 1978. It was produced by El Rey Productions of Mexico and La Luna Productions, one of several businesses run by Healdsburg's mayor, Abel de Luna. Eight to ten local residents had acting roles, and about 30 more appeared as extras.

== Government ==
=== Local ===
Healdsburg has a council–manager government. Its five City Council members serve four-year terms, and the council selects the mayor by majority vote each year. Council members were elected at large until 2026, when the city began electing them by district.

=== State and federal ===
In the California State Legislature, Healdsburg is in the 2nd senatorial district, represented by Democrat Mike McGuire, and in the 2nd Assembly district, represented by Democrat Chris Rogers.

In the United States House of Representatives, Healdsburg is in California's 2nd congressional district, represented by Democrat Jared Huffman.

== Education ==
The school district is Healdsburg Unified School District.

Schools include Healdsburg Elementary School, Healdsburg Junior High School, Healdsburg High School, and Marce Becerra Academy.

== Media ==
The weekly Healdsburg Tribune traces its history to 1865 and is published in print for paid subscribers. In 2022 its nonprofit owner, the Sonoma County Local News Initiative, announced the paper's final edition. The publisher Weeklys bought the paper and kept it in print without interruption.

== Infrastructure ==
=== Emergency services ===
The city provides police and fire services through the Healdsburg Police Department and Healdsburg Fire Department.

=== Transportation ===
Sonoma–Marin Area Rail Transit (SMART) is extending its commuter rail line to Healdsburg. As of 2026 the project was in design, with construction expected to begin in 2027 and passenger service planned for December 2028. In February 2024 the City Council endorsed the historic depot site for the station, but as of late 2026 SMART was again seeking public input on the location. The city is served by Sonoma County Transit buses.

The Amtrak Thruway 7 bus provides daily connections to Healdsburg from Martinez to the south, and Arcata to the north.

Healdsburg Municipal Airport, a city-operated general aviation airport, lies about 3 miles (4.8 km) northwest of downtown.

=== Utilities ===
The city operates its own electric, water and wastewater utilities. Its publicly owned electric utility serves about 5,800 meters and holds an allocation of power from the federal Central Valley Project through the Western Area Power Administration.

== Notable people ==
- Mary Ellen Bamford – writer, born in Healdsburg
- Kristen Barnhisel – winemaker, born in Healdsburg
- Helen Beardsley – author of Who Gets the Drumstick?, lived in Healdsburg
- Raymond Burr – actor (Perry Mason, Ironside), owned a vineyard near Healdsburg
- Kyle Connaughton – chef and co-owner of SingleThread in Healdsburg
- Jim Cullom – professional football player, born in Healdsburg
- Abel de Luna – the first Latino mayor of the city, 1978–1980
- L. Peter Deutsch – computer scientist and creator of Ghostscript, lived in Healdsburg
- Richard Diebenkorn – painter and printmaker, lived in Healdsburg
- Ron Elliott – lead guitarist and songwriter for The Beau Brummels, born in Healdsburg
- Paul Erdman – economist and financial novelist, lived in Healdsburg
- Henry D. Fitch – grantee of Rancho Sotoyome, on which Healdsburg was founded
- Josefa Carrillo Fitch – Californio landowner who came to Rancho Sotoyome, the land grant on which Healdsburg was founded, after her husband's death in 1849 and was confirmed in title to most of it
- Julius Fried – oilman and philanthropist, born in Healdsburg in 1872
- Rosinda Holmes – printmaker and painter, lived near Healdsburg from 1958 until her death in 2001
- Jess Stonestreet Jackson Jr. – wine entrepreneur and founder of Kendall-Jackson, lived near Healdsburg
- Roderick N. Matheson – Civil War colonel and early Healdsburg resident
- Patti McCarty – actress, grew up in Healdsburg
- Mike McGuire – California State Senator and former President pro tempore of the State Senate, lives in Healdsburg
- Heidi Newfield – country singer and former lead vocalist of Trick Pony, born in Healdsburg
- Pat Paulsen – comedian and satirical presidential candidate who launched his 1968 campaign at a rally in Healdsburg
- Thomas C. Reed – U.S. Secretary of the Air Force and National Security Council staffer, lived in Healdsburg
- Ariana Richards – actress (Jurassic Park) and painter, born in Healdsburg
- Effie Robinson – social worker and housing administrator, lived in Healdsburg
- Ralph Rose – Olympic gold medalist in track and field, born in Healdsburg
- Margaret Sibley – painter and arts organizer; a founder of Healdsburg Arts and the Balcony Gallery Co-operative
- Jack Sonni – guitarist for Dire Straits, lived in Healdsburg
- John Udell – pioneer and frontier diarist, lived in Healdsburg
- John Carl Warnecke – architect of public buildings and JFK's grave site, lived in Healdsburg
- Ellen G. White – co-founder of the Seventh-day Adventist Church, lived in Healdsburg from 1882 to 1891
- Hazel Hotchkiss Wightman – Wimbledon and Olympic tennis champion, born in Healdsburg
- Jim Wood – California State Assemblymember, resides in Healdsburg

== See also ==
- List of cities and towns in California
- List of cities and towns in the San Francisco Bay Area
- Madrona Manor
- Honor Mansion
- Sonoma County wine
- Wine Country (California)
