= San Francisco Municipal Railway fleet =

LRV and Bus Fleet of the San Francisco Municipal Railway (Muni)

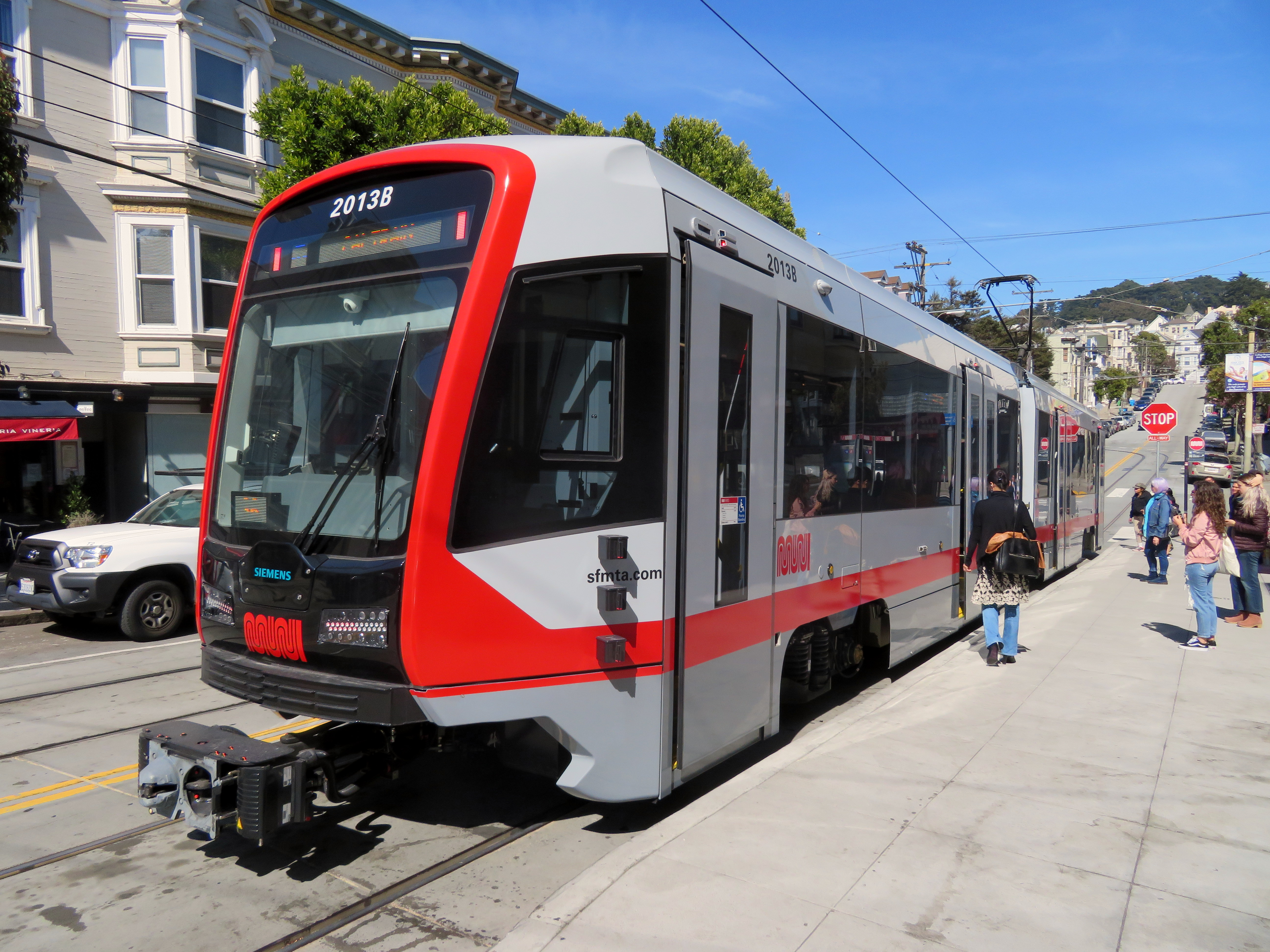
A Muni LRV4 (Siemens S200) car on Muni Metro

With five different modes of transport, the San Francisco Municipal Railway runs one of the most diverse fleets of vehicles in the United States. Roughly 550 diesel-electric hybrid buses, 300 electric trolleybuses, 250 modern light rail vehicles, 50 historic streetcars and 40 cable cars see active duty.

Muni's cable cars are the oldest and largest such system remaining in service in the world and its fleet of electric trolleybuses is the largest in the United States. In 2020, Muni completed the process of replacing its motor coach fleet – the first of which was procured in 1915 – with diesel-electric hybrid buses.

== Fleet overview ==
This chart is a summary of the vehicles currently operated by Muni. All buses are accessible at all stops. All streetcars are accessible; however, some surface stops on the E and F lines, and many Muni Metro surface stops, are not accessible. Cable cars are not accessible.

| Make/model | Fleet series (Quantity) | Years built | Division/Yard | Image | Notes |
|---|---|---|---|---|---|
| ENC E-Z Rider II (32-foot (9.8 m) low-floor diesel-electric hybrid bus) | 8531–8560 (30 buses) | 2021 | Woods | | |
| New Flyer Xcelsior XDE40 (40-foot (12 m) low-floor diesel-electric hybrid bus) | 8601–8662, 8701–8750 (112 buses) | 2013 | Woods, Kirkland | | |
| New Flyer Xcelsior XDE40 (40-foot (12 m) low-floor diesel-electric hybrid bus) | 8751–8780 (30 buses) | 2017 | Woods, Kirkland | | |
| New Flyer Xcelsior XDE40 (40-foot (12 m) low-floor diesel-electric hybrid bus) | 8800–8969 (170 buses) | 2016–2019 | Woods, Kirkland | | |
| New Flyer Xcelsior XDE60 (60-foot (18 m) low-floor diesel-electric hybrid bus) | 6500–6554 (55 buses) | 2015 | Flynn, Islais Creek | | |
| New Flyer Xcelsior XDE60 (60-foot (18 m) low-floor diesel-electric hybrid bus) | 6560–6697 (138 buses) | 2015–2018 | Flynn, Islais Creek | | |
| New Flyer Xcelsior XDE60 (60-foot (18 m) low-floor diesel-electric hybrid bus) | 6700–6730 (31 buses) | 2015–2016 | Flynn, Islais Creek | | |
| New Flyer Xcelsior XT40 (40-foot (12 m) low-floor electric trolleybus) | 5701–5885 (185 buses) | 2017–2019 | Presidio, Potrero | | |
| New Flyer Xcelsior XT60 (60-foot (18 m) low-floor electric trolleybus) | 7201–7293 (93 buses) | 2015–2018 | Potrero | | |
| New Flyer Xcelsior XE40 (40-foot (12 m) low-floor battery electric bus) | 5001–5003 (3 buses) | 2021 | Woods | | Test bus |
| BYD K9 (40-foot (12 m) low-floor battery electric bus) | 5004–5006 (3 buses) | 2021 | Woods | | Test bus |
| Proterra ZX5 (40-foot (12 m) low-floor battery electric bus) | 5007–5009 (3 buses) | 2021 | Woods | | Test bus |
| Nova Bus LFSe+ (40-foot (12 m) low-floor battery electric bus) | 5010–5012 (3 buses) | 2022 | Woods | | Test bus |
| Siemens S200 LRV4 (High-floor light rail vehicles) | 2001–2249 (249 vehicles) | 2016– | Green, Muni Metro East | | |
| PCC (High-floor historic streetcar) | 1006–1011, 1015, 1040, 1050–1053, 1055–1063, 1070–1080 (32 streetcars) | 1946–1952 | Cameron Beach | | See historic streetcar section for detailed information |
| Peter Witt (High-floor historic streetcar) | 1807, 1811, 1814, 1815, 1818, 1834, 1856, 1859, 1888, 1893, 1895 (11 streetcars) | 1928 | Cameron Beach | | See historic streetcar section for detailed information |
| Various high-floor historic streetcars | C-1, 1, 130, 151, 162, 189, 228, 233, 351, 496, 578-J, 578, 737, 798, 913, 916, 952 (17 streetcars) | 1895–1954 | Cameron Beach | | See historic trams section for detailed information |
| Various high-floor cable cars | Powell: 1-28, California: 49-60 (40 cars) | 1873– | Cable Car | | |

== Facilities ==
Muni Yards and Divisions
1 Presidio
2 Potrero
3 Woods
4 Flynn
5 Kirkland
6 Green/Cameron Beach
7 Muni Metro East
8 Cable Car
9 Pharr
10 Marin/Islais Creek

| Division | Opened | No. of vehicles | Vehicle type | Image | Notes |
|---|---|---|---|---|---|
| Presidio | 1912 | 132 | 40-foot trolleybuses | | The first yard built for Muni, originally used for the Geary streetcar lines |
| Potrero | 1914 | 146 | 40-foot and 60-foot trolleybuses | | Opened for streetcars in 1914 and equipped for trolleybuse in 1941. Closed in February 2026 for complete rebuilding, forecast to take around four years. |
| Woods | 1975 | 284 | 30-foot and 40-foot hybrid buses | | |
| Flynn | 1989 | 119 | 60-foot hybrid buses | | Named for H. Welton Flynn, the first chairman of the SFMTA Board of Directors. |
| Kirkland | 1950 | 88 | 40-foot hybrid buses | | |
| Green | 1977 | 140 | LRVs | | Located at Balboa Park station. Named for Curtis E. Green, a former general manager. |
| Cameron Beach | 1901 | 60 | Historic streetcars | | Known as Geneva Division until 2011, when it was named after Cameron Beach, a SFMTA board member. |
| Muni Metro East | 2008 | 100 | LRVs | | |
| Cable Car | 1887 | 40 | Cable cars | | Includes the San Francisco Cable Car Museum |
| Pharr | 1982 | —N/a | Historic streetcars | | Formerly known as Mint Yard. Small outdoor yard used for restoration work and to temporarily store Muni Metro trains. Named for David Pharr, a self-taught volunteer with Market Street Railway. |
| Marin | 1998 | —N/a | —N/a | | Muni motor coach acceptance yard, track shop and cable car/historic street car storage facility. |
| Islais Creek | 2013 | 105 | 60-foot hybrid buses | | Originally an open storage yard, it was replaced with an enclosed building in 2017. The $127 million facility, intended to replace the aging Kirkland Yard, has attracted local criticism for not including promised community amenities. |

== Bus fleet ==
As of 2022, Muni operates a fleet of roughly 550 diesel-electric hybrid buses and 300 electric trolleybuses, consisting nearly entirely of New Flyer Xcelsior coaches which have a high degree of parts commonality. The only non-Xcelsior coaches are the battery-electric test buses and the 32-foot (9.8 m) "community route" buses which were built by ENC as New Flyer does not offer a short Xcelsior coach.

=== Diesel-electric hybrid buses ===
Muni's active diesel fleet contains coaches ranging from thirty to sixty feet in length. All of Muni's current buses are diesel-electric hybrid buses, fueled with renewable diesel fuel made from bio-feedstock sources, including fats, oils and greases. The diesel-electric hybrid technology has proven very capable of climbing San Francisco's steep hills.

Before 2007, Muni had an all-Diesel fleet that had been purchased from three manufacturers, NABI, Neoplan and Orion, all of whom no longer sell buses in the U.S. (NABI merged into New Flyer, Neoplan left the North American market, and Daimler shutdown Orion), making repairs challenging. After purchasing its first hybrid buses in 2007, the agency embarked on a nearly 15 year project to replace the entire fleet. The new fleet has averaged more miles between road calls – in which a mechanic services a transit vehicle on the street – than the prior diesel coaches.

=== Electric trolleybuses ===
Muni's fleet of electric trolleybuses (ETBs) is the largest in the nation and serves many parts of the city. ETBs were very popular in the United States in the middle of the 20th century. Today, San Francisco is one of only four cities in the United States with an operational ETB fleet, but they play a major role in the Muni system, in part because of the city's many steep hills. Although their overhead wires are sometimes considered unsightly, ETBs are able to climb grades much steeper than conventional, non-cable streetcars and are quieter (particularly when climbing hills) and cleaner than diesel- or hybrid buses. The steepest grade on the Muni trolleybus system, 22.8% in the block of Noe Street between Cesar Chavez Street and 26th Street on route 24-Divisadero, is the steepest grade on any existing trolleybus line in the world, and several other sections of Muni ETB routes are among the world's steepest. Muni has operated trolleybuses since 1941 and the mode has been present in San Francisco since 1935—initially a line built and operated by the Market Street Railway and later taken over by Muni. Conversion of some existing diesel bus lines has been proposed.

In 1992, Muni tested its first 60-ft articulated trolleybus, the New Flyer E60, which was the first in the trolleybus fleet to have a wheelchair lift. The E60s were used on high-ridership trolleybus routes and started service in 1993.

Muni's active ETB fleet consists of articulated coaches from New Flyer (XT60), as well as standard 40 ft coaches from New Flyer (XT40). Historically, Muni ran ETBs from Brill, the St. Louis Car Company, Twin Coach, Marmon-Herrington, Flyer (E800 and E60) and Electric Transit, Inc. (ETI) (Skoda/AAI 14TrSF and 15TrSF).

=== Battery-electric test buses ===
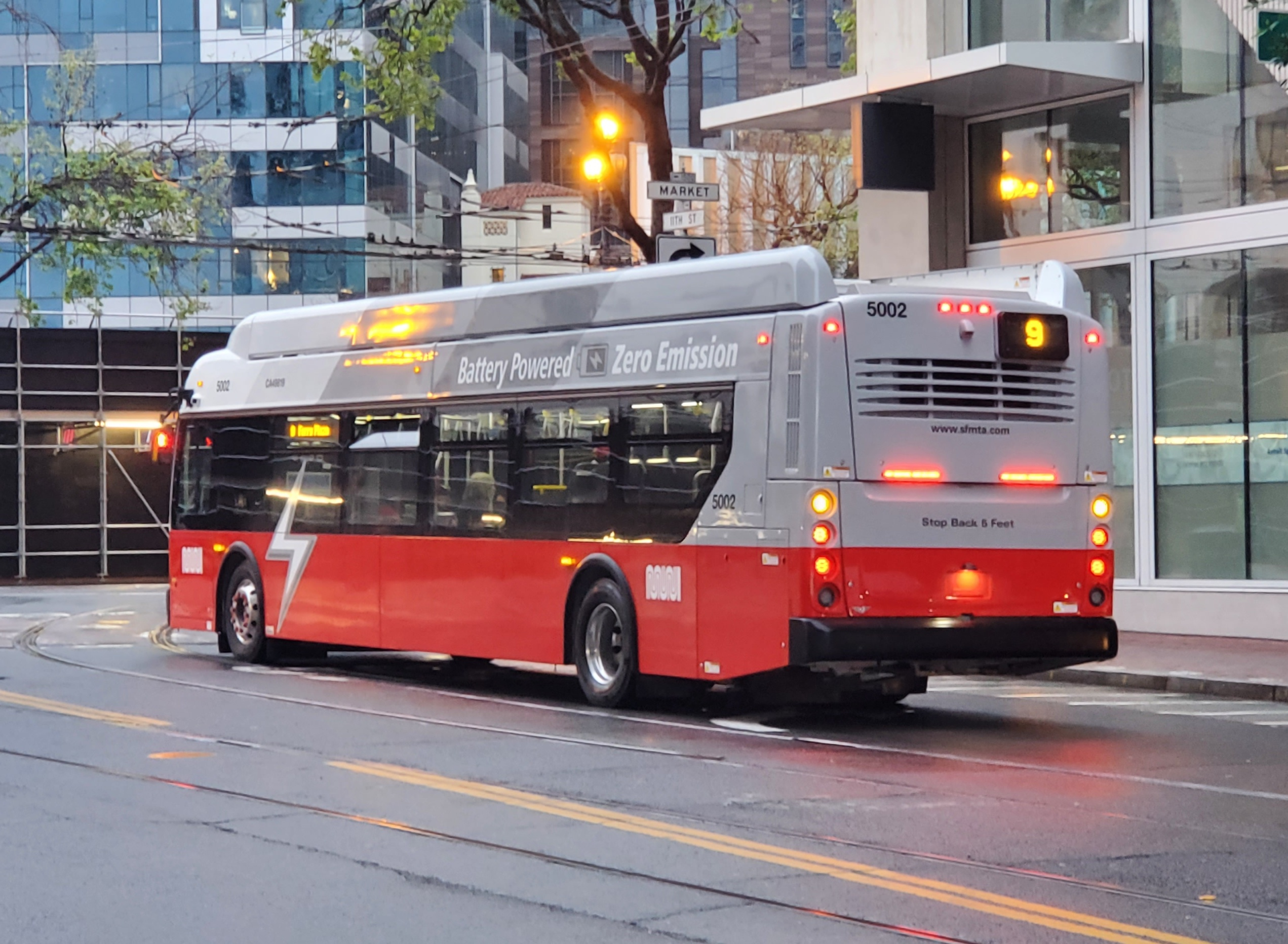
The New Flyer test bus in March 2022

In 2018, the SFMTA Board voted to purchase all-electric buses exclusively beginning in 2025, with the last non-electric buses retired by 2035. Muni previously had not bought battery-electric buses (BEBs) because they were not proven on steep hills and on high-ridership routes. In November 2019, Muni executed contracts with New Flyer (for $4.5 million), BYD Auto ($3.5 million), and Proterra ($5.3 million) to procure three BEBs from each vendor as a pilot program to evaluate their performance and test future bus features. Each contract has an option for up to three more BEBs. A fourth contract with Nova Bus ($4.8 million), the only major bus manufacturer excluded from the first round of contracts, was issued in April 2021. The buses in the pilot program will be charged at Woods using newly-installed chargers. Under the pilot program plan, the buses will operate on the 9 San Bruno, 22 Fillmore, 29 Sunset, and 44 O'Shaughnessy routes. The first battery-electric bus entered service in February 2022.

Under the Zero-Emission Bus Rollout Plan published in February 2021, 54 articulated buses will be the first production BEBs for Muni and that first purchase is planned for 2027. The last diesel-electric hybrid buses will leave service by 2037. By 2040, the Muni bus fleet is anticipated to be composed entirely of BEBs: 30 (30-foot) + 497 (40-foot) + 462 (60-foot) for 989 buses in total. No on-route charging is planned; BEBs will use depot chargers at six of Muni's yards. Eventually, it is planned to upgrade these yards with SAE J3105 (inverted pantograph) chargers over several years: Kirkland (77 chargers, 2024–27), Potrero (206 chargers, 2024–27), Flynn (109 chargers, 2025–28), Presidio (217 chargers, 2028–31), Islais Creek (149 chargers, 2030–33), and Woods (177 chargers, 2034–37).

The ZEB Rollout Plan was updated in July 2022. Under the revised ZEB Rollout Plan, the existing fleet of trolleybuses would be replaced one-for-one starting in 2031; the existing fleet of hybrid diesel-electric buses would be gradually replaced starting in 2026 with battery-electric buses until the planned retirement of the last diesel hybrids in 2037. In 2038, it is anticipated the mix of buses will be entirely BEBs (30× 32-foot, 403× 40-foot, and 297× 60-foot articulated) and trolleybuses (185× 40-foot and 93× 60-foot artic). The yard upgrades were re-sequenced and accelerated: Kirkland (91 chargers, 2022–25), Potrero (216, 2024–27), Islais Creek (117, 2024–30), Presidio (227, 2027–31), Flynn (107, 2029–34), and Woods (250, 2030–35). The total cost of the project is $1.8 billion, divided between new buses ($1.4 B) and charging infrastructure ($0.4 B), excluding the cost of labor and other potential infrastructure upgrades.

== Cable car fleet ==
Around the turn of the twentieth century, there were numerous cable car lines providing service to many sections of the city. Some of those cable cars are built by Muni themselves. Currently only three lines and forty cars remain.

== Light rail vehicle fleet ==
=== Contemporary light rail vehicles ===
The Muni Metro has run multiple types of light rail vehicles. Originally, 131 Boeing-Vertol cars, which Muni designated LRV1, were used. However, these proved to be extremely troublesome and were phased out of service beginning in 1997. The Boeing cars were replaced by 151 Italian-built Breda LRV2 and LRV3 models. Initially, the Breda vehicles were hailed as more reliable and easier to service than their predecessors. However, deferred maintenance and design defects have taken their toll on them.

Muni has expanded its fleet with new Siemens light rail vehicles; the 151 Bredas will be replaced one-for-one starting in 2021. The first phase of 68 Siemens S200 LRV4s (for fleet expansion: 24 Central Subway + 40 Option 1 + 4 Phase W) were delivered between 2017 and 2019, ahead of the scheduled opening of the Central Subway. SFMTA's initial contract with Siemens called for a maximum of 260 cars to be delivered: 175 in the base order (151 of which are to replace the Bredas, and 24 for fleet expansion to accommodate anticipated ridership via the Central Subway), 40 as Option 1, and 45 as Option 2. Four more Siemens LRV4s were ordered in June 2017 for Phase W, which anticipates expanded service to Chase Center, using the Mission Bay Transportation Improvement Fund. Option 1 (+40) was exercised in 2015 and Option 2 was partially exercised (+30) in 2021, increasing the total on order to 249. However, the 2021 order was cancelled in 2025, reducing the total back to 219.

The first LRV4 went into revenue service on November 17, 2017. By August 2025, 172 cars had entered service.

==== Inactive/retired light rail vehicles ====
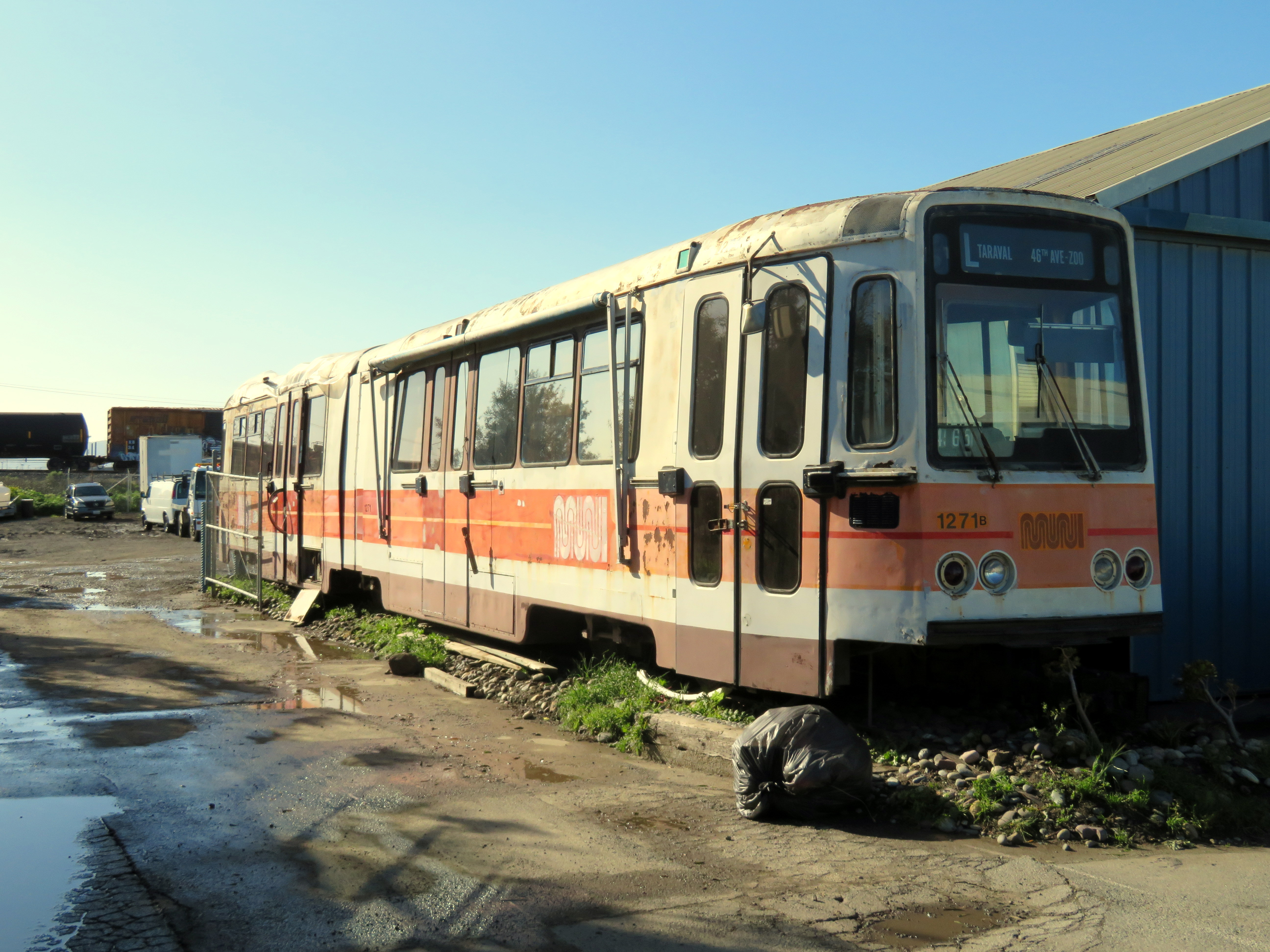
Ex-Muni 1271 in scrapyard (2018)

The US Standard Light Rail Vehicle was an attempt at a standardized light rail vehicle (LRV) promoted by the United States Urban Mass Transit Administration (UMTA) and built by Boeing Vertol in the 1970s. Part of a series of defense conversion projects in the waning days of the Vietnam War, the LRV was seen as both a replacement for older PCC streetcars in many cities and as a catalyst for new cities to construct light rail systems. The USSLRV was marketed as the Boeing LRV and is usually referred to as such. The USSLRV was purchased by both Muni and the MBTA (Boston), but no other public transportation system in the United States purchased USSLRVs. Under the settlement terms of a lawsuit between Boeing Vertol and MBTA, MBTA was granted the right to reject the last 40 cars. The completed MBTA cars sat in storage until Muni purchased 31 of them.

After the last LRV1 was retired in 2001, Muni stored two cars (1264 and 1320) at the Cameron Beach Yard (formerly the Geneva Streetcar Yard) for potential restoration and preservation by the Market Street Railway, but they declined to do so and both were scrapped in April 2016. Two LRV1s are preserved in museums:

- 1213 (since 2000), at the Oregon Electric Railway Museum
- 1258, at the Western Railway Museum

In addition, No. 1271 is used as an office trailer in a Bay Area scrapyard.

In 2014, the succeeding Breda LRV2/LRV3 fleet of 151 cars was scheduled to phase into retirement between 2021, when the oldest cars would be 25 years old, and 2027. Twenty-five years is considered the useful lifespan of light rail vehicles, per the FTA and Muni. However, by 2018, delivery of the Siemens LRV4 (Siemens S200 SF) fleet was ahead of schedule, so Muni began considering an earlier retirement for some of the oldest Breda cars, and the last LRV2 series were retired in December 2023. In 2025, Muni cancelled an order for 30 additional LRV4 cars that it had placed in 2021, reducing the total number on order from 249 to 219, because ridership on the Muni Metro system remained well below what it had been before the COVID-19 pandemic, and only around 130 LRVs are scheduled for service during rush hour. Retirement of the Breda fleet was completed in 2025, their last regular use in service ending in late July, followed by a "farewell" run by one car in service for several hours on November 12, 2025. LRV3 no. 1534 is preserved at the Western Railway Museum.

| Model | Year built | Fleet series | Quantity | Year of retirement | Notes | Image |
|---|---|---|---|---|---|---|
| Boeing USSLRV (LRV1) | 1978 | 1200–1299 | 100 | 1996–2001 | 1222 and 1252 were damaged during subway testing on November 12, 1979; these cars were stripped of parts used to finish ex-MBTA 3565, subsequently renumbered 1252 and delivered January 1982. 1212 collided with 1255 at the Van Ness junction in the Muni Metro subway in 1987. The undamaged halves were mated together into a new 1255 and the damaged halves were scrapped in February 1994. The last day of service for any Boeing LRVs was December 31, 2001. | |
| Boeing USSLRV (LRV1) | 1977 | 1300–1329 | 30 | 1996–2001 | Cars rejected by MBTA, entered service 1981–1984. Last day of service was December 31, 2001. | |
| Breda LRV2 | 1995–1998 | 1400–1476 | 77 | 2021–2023 | 1407 and 1433 collided at West Portal in 2009. In 2010, Muni contracted Breda to mate the undamaged halves with 1429 and 1435, which were damaged in separate incidents. The four damaged halves were scrapped. 1417 and Siemens car 2061 collided in January 2021. 1417 was stripped of parts before being scrapped in March 2021, and 2061 was repaired in June 2021, then re-entering service in August. The last cars were retired in December 2023. | |
| Breda LRV3 | 1999–2003 | 1477–1550 | 74 | 2025 | 1494 was hit by a truck on July 20, 2017, and was stripped of parts before being scrapped in March 2021. The last cars were retired in July 2025, except for a one-day operation of one car (1534) in November 2025 as a farewell event. | |
| Siemens S200 SF (LRV4) | 2016–2026 | 2001–2219 | 219 | — | Entered revenue service in 2017. An optional order for 30 that was placed in 2021, increasing the total to 249, was cancelled in 2025. | |

== Historic streetcar fleet ==
Historic streetcars are run on the F Market & Wharves and E Embarcadero lines. Introduced as a regular, year-round service in 1995, the F-line heritage streetcar service started out 12 years earlier as a temporary, replacement tourist attraction for the cable cars – known as the San Francisco Historic Trolley Festival – during an almost two-year suspension (1982–84) of all cable-car service to permit major infrastructure rebuilding to take place.

The historic streetcar fleet is composed mostly of PCC cars as well as 1920s-vintage Peter Witt cars from Milan. In addition, Muni operates streetcars from around the world which were bought or donated to the transit agency.

The vintage fleet is looked over by the nonprofit Market Street Railway organization, but the vehicles are owned and operated by Muni.

=== PCC fleet ===
Muni's PCC streetcars are divided into one of five classes, sorted by fleet number and original service:

Overview of PCC streetcars owned by Muni
| Class | Fleet nos. (qty) | Original service (built) | Muni service | Length | Width | Height | Weight | Motors |
|---|---|---|---|---|---|---|---|---|
| Big Ten | 1006–1015 (8) | Muni (1948) | 1948–82; 1995+ | 50 ft 5 in (15.37 m) | 9 ft 0 in (2.74 m) | 10 ft 1 in (3.07 m) | 40,140 lb (18,210 kg) | 4× General Electric 1220E1 |
| Baby Ten | 1016–1040 (7) | Muni (1951–52) | 1951–82; 2012+ | 46 ft 5 in (14.15 m) | 9 ft 0 in (2.74 m) | 10 ft 3 in (3.12 m) | 37,600 lb (17,100 kg) | 4× Westinghouse 1432K |
| 1050 | 1050–1064 (13) | PTC (1947–48) | 1995+ | 48 ft 5 in (14.76 m) | 8 ft 4 in (2.54 m) | 10 ft 3 in (3.12 m) | 37,990 lb (17,230 kg) | 4× Westinghouse 1432J |
| 1070 | 1070–1080 (11) | TCRT (1946–47) | 2005+ | 46 ft 5 in (14.15 m) | 9 ft 0 in (2.74 m) | 10 ft 3 in (3.12 m) | 37,600 lb (17,100 kg) | 4× General Electric 1220 |
| 1100 | 1101–1170 (9) | SLPS (1946) | 1957–82 | 46 ft 0 in (14.02 m) | 9 ft 0 in (2.74 m) | 11 ft 2 in (3.40 m) | 36,420 lb (16,520 kg) | 4× General Electric 1220A1 |

==== Big Ten/Baby Ten/1000s ====
===== First batch =====
Before 1995, several PCCs were rehabilitated by Morrison–Knudsen (MK) before entering revenue service. These include three of the double-ended "Torpedo" cars or "Big Tens" (1007, 1010, and 1015), which were originally built for Muni; and the single-ended 1050-class (1050–1064), which were originally built for Philadelphia Transportation Company (PTC), the predecessor to today's SEPTA. Both of these sub-classes were built originally in the late 1940s.

Car 1054 (original 2121) was damaged beyond repair following an accident on November 16, 2003 and it was stored awaiting scrapping. In 2014, Muni sent 1056, the first from the original batch of sixteen to be overhauled at Brookville Equipment Corporation. The entire first batch of sixteen is scheduled to be rebuilt at Brookville; the next cars to be sent were 1051, 1060, and 1059 in that order; followed (in indeterminate order) by 1055, 1062, and 1063. The first streetcar to re-enter service, 1051, was re-dedicated to Harvey Milk in March 2017, and was followed back into service by 1056.

===== Second batch =====
The cars that are presently numbered 1070–1080 were purchased originally by Twin Cities Rapid Transit in 1946. They were sold to Newark in 1953 and ran on the Newark City Subway until replacement by modern light rail vehicles in 2001. The San Francisco Municipal Railway acquired these cars in 2004 and had the cars overhauled at Brookville Equipment Corporation. Some of the cars were put in service in early 2007, but were taken out of service for wiring problems. These problems were eventually repaired. All these cars are single-end cars.

===== Third batch =====
A third group of PCC cars originally built for Muni in 1948 and 1952 were restored at Brookville in 2010–2011 and subsequently returned to service. This batch includes four double-ended "Big Ten" cars (1006, 1008, 1009, 1011) and the sole restored "Baby Ten" (1040), the last PCC car ever built in North America.

===== Remaining PCC cars =====
The remainder of the PCC streetcars assigned numbers 10xx which have yet to be restored mostly were acquired by Muni before 1952. This includes cars from three distinct sub-classes: the double-ended "Big Ten" (1014; the "Big 10s" comprise 1006–1015), the single-ended "Baby Tens" (1016–1040), and the "1050s". Of the 1050s, which were acquired from SEPTA in the early 1990s, most were restored and are in service, but two were scrapped: 1054 (ex-SEPTA 2121), which was damaged beyond repair in 2003 after re-entering revenue service, and 1064 (ex-SEPTA 2133), which was never rehabilitated after acquisition.

Gunnar Henrioulle acquired several retired "Baby Ten" and "11xx" class cars as the largest single purchaser of retired Muni cars in the mid-1990s. He also acquired an ex-San Diego PCC (#502), two ex-Toronto PCCs (#4404 and #4472), and built a double-ended PCC from ex-Baby Ten #1024 and #1035. Henrioulle had intended to use the PCCs for a heritage streetcar line called Tahoe Valley Lines, but the government of South Lake Tahoe, California did not approve his plans and he was forced to sell off most of his fleet in 2001; four of his Baby Tens (#1026, 1027, 1038, and 1034) were reacquired by Muni at this time.

"Big 10" class: double-ended "torpedo" (1006–1015)
| # | City/system represented | Status | Notes | Image |
|---|---|---|---|---|
| 1006 | San Francisco (wings) | Operational | This car was purchased in 1948 and ran in San Francisco until retirement in 1987. Restored by Brookville in 2010/11. Returned to service on October 6, 2012. | |
| 1007 | Philadelphia Suburban Transportation Company | Operational | Built in 1948 for Muni. Retired in 1982 and stored until 1994. Restored in 1995 by MK. Previously painted in Muni's Breda LRV livery; repainted into the present livery in 1997. Restored again in 2020. | |
| 1008 | San Francisco (wings) | Operational | This car was purchased in 1948 and ran in San Francisco. It was outfitted with a pantograph and used for testing in the Market Street Subway in November 1977 – the only PCC car to enter the subway. It was eventually converted into a work car, then restored by Brookville Equipment (2010–11) and returned to service on August 25, 2012. | |
| 1009 | Dallas Terminal & Railway | Operational | This car was purchased in 1948 and ran in San Francisco until retirement in 1982. This car was stored in Pier 72 where it was damaged by arsonists. Restored by Brookville in 2010/11 and returned to service on January 17, 2013. However, the computerized door motors proved problematic and 1009 returned to Brookville for a refit, returning to San Francisco in 2014. | |
| 1010 | San Francisco Municipal Railway (1939 livery) | Operational | Built in 1948 for Muni. Retired in 1982 and stored until 1994. Restored in 1996 by MK. Underwent restoration at Brookville, returned to service as of July 2025. | |
| 1011 | San Francisco (Market Street Railway zip stripe) | Operational | This car was purchased in 1948 and ran in San Francisco until retirement in 1982. This car was stored in Pier 72 where it was damaged by arsonists. 1011 was the last of the four double-enders restored at Brookville in 2010/11. It returned to San Francisco after an extensive testing period at Brookville and underwent burn-in testing before re-entering service in 2014. | |
| 1014 | San Francisco | Permanently retired | Double-ended torpedo, retired in 1982; still owned by Muni; on open-ended loan to Sydney Tramway Museum. | |
| 1015 | Illinois Terminal Railroad | Operational | Built in 1948 for Muni. Retired in 1982 and stored until 1994. Restored in 1995 by MK. Returned to San Francisco in late 2019 following restoration at Brookville. | |

"Baby Ten" class: single-ended (1016–1040)
| # | City/system represented | Status | Notes | Image |
|---|---|---|---|---|
| 1023 | San Francisco | Scrapped | Scrapped in late 2019/early 2020 at Schnitzer Steel in Oakland with significant structural rust. | |
| 1026 | San Francisco | Stored | Reacquired from Gunnar Henrioulle in 2001. Largely intact; candidate for restoration. | |
| 1027 | San Francisco | Stored | Reacquired from Gunnar Henrioulle in 2001. Candidate for restoration. | |
| 1028 | San Francisco | Stored | Reacquired from Gunnar Henrioulle in 2001. Largely intact; candidate for restoration. | |
| 1031 | San Francisco | Scrapped | Scrapped in late 2019/early 2020 at Schnitzer Steel in Oakland with significant structural rust. | |
| 1033 | San Francisco | Stored | Purchased 1952 as the seventh-to-last PCC streetcar ever built in the United States. Ran in San Francisco until retirement in 1982. After retirement, it was sold to Orange Empire Railway Museum. Reacquired in 2003 and stored in Marin Yard. | |
| 1034 | San Francisco | Stored | Purchased 1952 as the sixth-to-last PCC streetcar ever built in the United States. Ran in San Francisco until retirement in 1982. After retirement, it was sold to Gunnar Henrioulle. Reacquired in 2001 and stored in Marin Yard. Largely intact; candidate for restoration. | |
| 1038 | San Francisco (Landor) | Scrapped | Purchased 1952 as the third-to-last PCC streetcar ever built in the United States. Ran in San Francisco until retirement in 1982. Scrapped in late 2019/early 2020 at Schnitzer Steel in Oakland with significant structural rust. | |
| 1039 | San Francisco (Simplified) | Stored | Purchased 1952 as the second-to-last PCC streetcar ever built in the United States. Ran in San Francisco until retirement in 1982. After retirement, it was sold to Orange Empire Railway Museum. Reacquired in 2003 and stored in Marin Yard. Largely intact; candidate for restoration. | |
| 1040 | San Francisco (wings) | Operational | Purchased 1952 as the last PCC streetcar ever built in the United States. Ran in San Francisco until retirement in 1982, but retained by city. Returned to service for the summer 1983 Historic Trolley Festival. Operated briefly in 1995. Restored by Brookville in 2010/11. Returned to service on March 13, 2012. | |

1050 class: single-ended, ex-SEPTA (1050–1064)
| # | City/system represented | Status | Notes | Image |
|---|---|---|---|---|
| 1050 | St. Louis Public Service Company (1950 livery) | Operational | Built in 1948 for PTC as 2119. Acquired by Muni in 1992 and re-entered service in 1995 after restoration by MK bearing legacy San Francisco "Wings" livery (1951). Went for rebuild in late 2016. 1050 was repainted into a tribute livery for Saint Louis. | |
| 1051 | San Francisco Municipal Railway (1963 livery) | Operational | Built in 1948 for PTC as 2123. Acquired by Muni in 1992 and re-entered service in 1995 after restoration by MK. Dedicated for Supervisor Harvey Milk in 2008, later appearing in the film Milk. Sent to Brookville for rebuild; returned in 2016 and re-entered service in 2017. | |
| 1052 | Los Angeles Railway (1937 livery) | Operational | Built in 1948 for PTC as 2110. Acquired by Muni in 1992 and re-entered service in 1995 after restoration by MK. | |
| 1053 | NYC Board of Transportation (Brooklyn, NY) | Operational | Built in 1947 for PTC as 2721. Originally configured with a separate conductor's booth until 1955. Acquired by Muni in 1992 and re-entered service in 1995 after restoration by MK. Rebuilt by Brookville in 2018. | |
| 1054 | Philadelphia Transit Commission (PCC-1938 Livery) | Scrapped | Purchased in 1948 by Philadelphia Transportation Company (PTC) as 2121 and ran until retirement in 1988. Sold to San Francisco Municipal Railway in 1992 and returned to service in 1995 until damaged beyond repair following a collision with a MUNI Metro Breda LRV (#1541) on Nov 16, 2003. Scrapped in late 2019/early 2020 at Schnitzer Steel in Oakland. | |
| 1055 | Philadelphia Transportation Company (1947 livery) | Operational | Built in 1948 for PTC as 2122. Acquired by Muni in 1992 and re-entered service in 1995 after restoration by MK. Rebuilt by Brookville in 2017, repainted to as-delivered Philadelphia livery. | |
| 1056 | Kansas City Public Service Company | Operational | Built in 1948 for PTC as 2113. Acquired by Muni in 1992 and re-entered service in 1995 after restoration by MK. Out of service after a cracked bolster was discovered in 2011; rebuilt by Brookville and returned to Muni in 2016, re-entered service in 2017. | |
| 1057 | Cincinnati Street Railway | Operational | Built in 1948 for PTC as 2138. Acquired by Muni in 1992 and re-entered service in 1995 after restoration by MK. Rebuilt by Brookville in 2018/19. | |
| 1058 | Chicago Transit Authority | Operational | Built in 1948 for PTC as 2124. Acquired by Muni in 1992 and re-entered service in 1995 after restoration by MK. Previously painted in CTA's 1950s green and cream livery; repainted into the 1940s "Green Hornet" livery in 2010 after accident repairs. Rebuilt by Brookville in 2018/19. | |
| 1059 | Boston Elevated Railway | Operational | Built in 1948 for PTC as 2099. Acquired by Muni in 1992 and re-entered service in 1995 after restoration by MK. Rebuilt by Brookville in 2017. | |
| 1060 | Philadelphia Transportation Company (1938 livery) | Operational | Built in 1947 for PTC as 2715. Originally configured with a separate conductor's booth until 1955. Acquired by Muni in 1992 and re-entered service in 1995 after restoration by MK. Previously painted in Newark, NJ's Public Service Coordinated Transport livery; repainted into the present livery (previously worn by retired 1054) in 2005 after accident repairs. Rebuilt by Brookville in 2017. | |
| 1061 | Pacific Electric | Operational | Built in 1948 for PTC as 2116. Acquired by Muni in 1992 and re-entered service in 1995 after restoration by MK. Rebuilt by Brookville in 2018. Returned with revised livery. | |
| 1062 | Pittsburgh Railways | Operational | Built in 1948 for PTC as 2101. Acquired by Muni in 1992 and re-entered service in 1995 after restoration by MK with Louisville Railway livery. Rebuilt by Brookville in 2017; returned with Pittsburgh livery. | |
| 1063 | Baltimore Transit Company | Operational | Built in 1948 for PTC as 2096. Acquired by Muni in 1992 and re-entered service in 1995 after restoration by MK. Rebuilt by Brookville in 2017 and returned with alternate and more accurate Baltimore livery. It was damaged in a collision with a truck in January 2018, shortly after returning to revenue service. | |
| 1064 | Philadelphia Transportation Company | Scrapped | Ex-SEPTA streetcar used as a demonstrator for vehicle evaluation before the F-line's inception. Purchased by PTC in 1946 as 2133; acquired by Muni in 1990 and renumbered to 1064 but never re-entered service. Scrapped in late 2019/early 2020 at Schnitzer Steel in Oakland with significant structural rust. | |

1070 class: single-ended, ex-Newark City Subway (1070–1080)
| # | City/system represented | Status | Notes | Image |
|---|---|---|---|---|
| 1070 | Newark, New Jersey (Newark City Subway) | Operational | Newark operated PCCs from 1953 to 2001. This car was built as No. 333 for Twin City Rapid Transit (TCRT), and renumbered to No. 14 for Newark. First sent to San Francisco in 2002 as a trial to evaluate condition. Nicknamed "Ruby Slippers" for its red wheels. | |
| 1071 | Minneapolis-St. Paul, Minnesota (Twin City Rapid Transit) | Operational | TCRT operated PCCs from 1945 to 1954. This car was built as No. 362 for TCRT and renumbered to No. 23 for Newark. | |
| 1072 | Mexico City (Servicio de Transportes Eléctricos) | Operational | STE operated PCCs from 1945 to the 1980s. This car was built as No. 339 for TCRT and renumbered to No. 20 for Newark. | |
| 1073 | El Paso-Juárez (El Paso City Lines) | Operational | El Paso operated PCCs from 1947 to 1973. This car was built as No. 361 for TCRT and renumbered to No. 22 for Newark. | |
| 1074 | Toronto, Ontario (Toronto Transit Commission) | Operational | Toronto operated PCCs from 1938 to 1995. This car was built as No. 321 for TCRT and renumbered to No. 2 for Newark. | |
| 1075 | Cleveland, Ohio (Cleveland Transit System) | Operational | Cleveland operated PCCs from 1946 to 1953. This car was built as No. 336 for TCRT and renumbered to No. 17 for Newark. | |
| 1076 | Washington, DC (D.C. Transit) | Operational | Washington, DC operated PCCs from 1937 to 1962. This car was built as No. 331 for TCRT and renumbered to No. 12 for Newark. | |
| 1077 | Birmingham, Alabama (Birmingham Electric Company) | Operational | Birmingham operated PCCs from 1947 to 1953. This car was built as No. 360 for TCRT and renumbered to No. 21 for Newark. | |
| 1078 | San Diego (San Diego Electric Railway) | Operational | San Diego operated PCCs from 1937 to 1949. This car was built as No. 338 for TCRT and renumbered to No. 19 for Newark. | |
| 1079 | Detroit, Michigan (Department of Street Railways) | Operational | Detroit operated PCCs from 1947 to 1956. This car was built as No. 330 for TCRT and renumbered to No. 11 for Newark. | |
| 1080 | Los Angeles (National City Lines) | Operational | Los Angeles operated PCCs from 1937 to 1963. This car was built as No. 328 for TCRT and renumbered to No. 9 for Newark. | |

===== 11xx class =====
The 1100s series of cars were purchased in 1957 by Muni from St. Louis Public Service. These cars were retired in 1982 with the inauguration of Muni Metro LRV/subway service, with most being sold off to Henrioulle for Tahoe Valley Lines. In 2005–06, three of the 11xx class were purchased for the Silver Line heritage trolley service of the San Diego Trolley: #1122 (ex-St. Louis #1716), #1123 (ex-St. Louis #1728), and #1170 (ex-St. Louis #1777). These were renumbered to #529, 530, and 531, respectively, for the San Diego service and #529 was restored by early 2011. Under pressure, Henrioulle would sell nine PCCs (including six of the 11xx class: #1113, 1127, 1139, 1145, 1148, and 1169) to a developer in St. Charles, Missouri in 2007 for the planned St. Charles City Streetcar. The developer went bankrupt in 2009 and the streetcars were stored; after a fire in 2012, the St. Charles streetcars were scrapped.

1100 class: single-ended, ex-St. Louis cars
| # | City/system represented | Status | Notes | Image |
|---|---|---|---|---|
| 1103 | San Francisco | Stored | Originally built as #1701 for St. Louis Public Service (SLPS) in 1946. | |
| 1106 | San Francisco | Scrapped | Originally built as #1733 for SLPS in 1946. Scrapped in late 2019/early 2020 at Schnitzer Steel in Oakland with significant structural rust. | |
| 1108 | San Francisco | Scrapped | Originally built as #1737 for SLPS in 1946. Scrapped in late 2019/early 2020 at Schnitzer Steel in Oakland with significant structural rust. | |
| 1115 | San Francisco | Stored | Originally built as #1703 for SLPS in 1946. | |
| 1122 | San Diego | Transferred | Originally built as #1716 and #1728 for SLPS in 1946; renumbered to #1122 and #1123 for Muni, respectively. Sold to Gunnar Henrioulle in 1994, then reacquired in 2005. Transferred to San Diego Trolley and renumbered (1122→529; 1123→530; 1170→531) for use on that system's Silver Line. | |
| 1123 | San Diego | Transferred | Originally built as #1716 and #1728 for SLPS in 1946; renumbered to #1122 and #1123 for Muni, respectively. Sold to Gunnar Henrioulle in 1994, then reacquired in 2005. Transferred to San Diego Trolley and renumbered (1122→529; 1123→530; 1170→531) for use on that system's Silver Line. | |
| 1125 | San Francisco | Scrapped | Originally built as #1715 for SLPS in 1946. Scrapped in late 2019/early 2020 at Schnitzer Steel in Oakland with significant structural rust. | |
| 1128 | St. Louis Public Service | Stored | Renumbered and repainted 1982/83 as St. Louis 1704, its original identity, for use in the Historic Trolley Festival | |
| 1130 | San Francisco | Stored | Originally built as #1754 for SLPS in 1946. | |
| 1139 | San Francisco | Stored | Originally built as #1725 for SLPS in 1946. Listed for potential disposal in 2018 with significant structural rust. Retained by the SFMTA for future use along with other stored cars. | |
| 1140 | San Francisco | Transferred | Originally built as #1711 for SLPS in 1946. Listed for potential disposal in 2018 with significant structural rust. Donated to the National Museum of Transportation in January 2020, to be used as a parts car for another former Muni and SLPCS car (1164/1743). | |
| 1146 | San Francisco | Stored | Originally built as #1763 for SLPS in 1946. Reacquired by Muni in 2004 after relocations to Belton, Grandview and Kansas City Railroad (1982–92) and Iowa Trolley Park (1992–2004). | |
| 1158 | San Francisco | Stored | Originally built as #1749 for SLPS in 1946. | |
| 1160 | San Francisco | Stored | Originally built as #1761 for SLPS in 1946. | |
| 1168 | San Francisco (Landor) | Stored | Originally built as #1779 for SLPS in 1946. | |
| 1170 | San Diego | Transferred | Originally built as #1777 for SLPS in 1946; renumbered to #1170 for Muni. Sold to Gunnar Henrioulle in 1994, then reacquired in 2005. Transferred to San Diego Trolley and renumbered (1122→529; 1123→530; 1170→531) for use on that system's Silver Line. | |

Miscellaneous PCCs
| # | City/system represented | Status | Notes |
|---|---|---|---|
| 2147 | Philadelphia, Pennsylvania | Stored | This was acquired as a parts car for the 1050-class PCC fleet, and has a different propulsion from the current fleet. This car is notable for being the only PCC car to ever operate in New Orleans. |
| 4008 | Pittsburgh, Pennsylvania | Scrapped | Port Authority 4000 Series PCC, originally built for the Pittsburgh Railways Company, later the Port Authority of Allegheny County. When portions of Port Authority's streetcar system were being rebuilt and modernized in the 1980s, 45 of the Authority's PCC's were to be completely rebuilt as well. However, due to budget problems, only a dozen were actually rebuilt, including 4008 and 4009. After the Overbrook Line's closure in 1993, these cars were relegated to a shuttle service between the Drake Loop and Castle Shannon until retirement in 1999. Purchased at auction in 2001, Nos. 4008 and 4009 were stored and required re-gauging as well as modifications to make them ADA-compliant. Scrapped in late 2019/early 2020 at Schnitzer Steel in Oakland with significant structural rust. |
| 4009 | Pittsburgh, Pennsylvania | Scrapped | |

=== Milan "Peter Witt" trams ===
These Peter Witt streetcars were originally in service in Milan, Italy. Original Italian signage was kept in place, supplemented with English signs.

| Car # | Livery | Status | Image |
|---|---|---|---|
| 1807 | Milan, Italy (Yellow/White) | In service | |
| 1811 | Milan, Italy (Yellow/White) | Out of service | |
| 1814 | Milan, Italy (Two-tone green) | In service | |
| 1815 | Milan, Italy (Orange) | In service | |
| 1818 | Milan, Italy (Two-tone green) | In service | |
| 1834 | Milan, Italy (Orange) | Undergoing restoration | |
| 1856 | Milan, Italy (Orange) | In service | |
| 1859 | Milan, Italy (Orange) | In service | |
| 1888 | Milan, Italy (Two-tone green) | Under repair | |
| 1893 | Milan, Italy (Orange) | In service | |
| 1895 | Milan, Italy (Orange) | In service | |

=== Historic trams ===
==== San Francisco ====
The following shows trams that operated in San Francisco before the 1950s under either San Francisco Muni or Market Street Railway.

| Car # | City of origin (car's paint scheme colors) | Status | Notes | Image |
|---|---|---|---|---|
| 1 | San Francisco (Battleship Gray) | Operational | This car was purchased in 1912 as one of the original streetcars publicly owned by Muni. The car originally was retired in 1951 and was set aside for a museum. This car was restored in 1962 as part of Muni's 50th anniversary and ran occasionally on special excursions until the late 1980s. This car was restored again in 1995 for the opening of the F-line. In 2009 it was shipped to Brookville Equipment Corporation for a complete restoration at a cost of $1.8 million. This streetcar returned to service on October 6, 2012. | |
| 130 | San Francisco (Blue/Gold) | Awaiting restoration | This car was purchased in 1914 as part of a 100-car order from Jewett Car Company. This car ran in San Francisco until retirement in 1958. It was converted into a wrecker and was restored to blue and gold colors in 1983. In 2002, No. 130 was dedicated to longtime San Francisco Chronicle columnist Herb Caen. | |
| 162 | San Francisco (Wings) | Under repair | This car was purchased in 1914 as part of a 125-car order from Jewett Car Company. This car ran in San Francisco until retirement in 1958 and was then sold with another car to Orange Empire Railway Museum. It was reacquired in 2003 by the San Francisco Municipal Railway and restored by Market Street Railway in 2004. The car then underwent further restoration by Muni starting in 2005 and returned to service in August 2008, the 50-year anniversary of its earlier retirement. On January 4, 2014, this car was involved in a collision with a container truck, seriously damaging one of its ends. Rebuilt in Long Beach and returned to Muni in April 2018. | |
| 578-S | Market Street Railway | Operational, special service only | Built in 1896 by Hammond Car Company in San Francisco; converted to a work car after the 1906 San Francisco earthquake and renumbered to 0601. Restored to original appearance in 1956 and permanently loaned to the Western Railway Museum, but recalled by Muni in 1984 to serve in Trolley Festivals. | |
| 798 | Market Street Railway (Whiplash Green/White) | Awaiting restoration | Built in 1924 by the Market Street Railway at Elkton Shops (now Green Division at Ocean & San Jose). Sold for scrap in 1946 and eventually became a jewelry store in Columbia before being repurchased in 1984 using money donated by Embarcadero Center and returned to Muni. Only surviving streetcar of the class operated by Maya Angelou. Moved to Cameron Beach Yard in 2011. | |

==== "Wheels of the world" trams ====
A collection of authentic vintage trolleys, trams, and streetcars from cities other than San Francisco.

| Car # | City of origin (car's paint scheme colors) | Status | Notes | Image |
|---|---|---|---|---|
| 18 | Philadelphia, Pennsylvania | Under restoration | Both of these double-ended PCCs were built in 1949 by St. Louis Car Co. for Philadelphia Suburban Transportation (later SEPTA), retired in 1982, and acquired from Shore Line Trolley Museum in 2017 for $196,000; in return, Cable Car No. 28 was donated to Shore Line in 2018. The PCCs were sent from Shore Line to Brookville for rehabilitation in June 2017. | |
| 21 | Philadelphia, Pennsylvania | Under restoration | Both of these double-ended PCCs were built in 1949 by St. Louis Car Co. for Philadelphia Suburban Transportation (later SEPTA), retired in 1982, and acquired from Shore Line Trolley Museum in 2017 for $196,000; in return, Cable Car No. 28 was donated to Shore Line in 2018. The PCCs were sent from Shore Line to Brookville for rehabilitation in June 2017. | |
| 106 | Moscow/Orel, Russia (Red) | Awaiting restoration | "Streetcar Named Desire for Peace", gifted to Mayor Dianne Feinstein by the Soviet Union through the efforts of Maury Klebolt. Last ran in 1992 for the parade celebrating the 100th anniversary of streetcar service in San Francisco. | |
| 151 | Osaka, Japan | Awaiting restoration | Built by Kawasaki in 1927; arrived in San Francisco in 1988. Restoration prioritized over 578-J because 151 is from sister city (Osaka) and has four motors, making it more suitable for service. | |
| 189 | Porto, Portugal | Awaiting restoration | Copy of a J. G. Brill Company streetcar design, built in 1929. Purchased in 1984 from Paul Class after running in the first (1983) San Francisco Historic Trolley Festival. Last run in 1987. | |
| 228 | Blackpool, England (Green/White) | Operational | Open-air "boat" car, one of twelve built for Blackpool Transport in 1934. Brought to San Francisco in 1984. | |
| 233 | Blackpool, England (Green/White) | Operational | Open-air "boat" car, one of twelve built for Blackpool Transport in 1934. Declared surplus in 2010 and purchased from Lancastrian Transport Trust in 2013. | |
| 351 | Johnstown, Pennsylvania (Orange/Cream) | Awaiting restoration | Intended restoration as a teaching trolley. Originally built in 1926 with rattan seats and wood trim. | |
| 496 | Melbourne, Australia (Green/Beige) | Operational | W2-class, first operated in Feb 1928. Purchased by Muni in 1984 with No. 586 (a parts car). As of 2018, regularly operates weekends on E Line, which requires double-ended cars, because there is no turnaround at the southern terminus. | |
| 578-J | Kobe/Hiroshima, Japan | Undergoing restoration | Originally built in 1927 as No. 574, one of the 570 streetcar class for the Kobe City Railways. Acquired by Hiroshima Electric Railway in 1971 when Kobe City Railways closed; later brought to San Francisco in 1986 for the Trolley Festival that year. | |
| 586 | Melbourne, Australia (Green/Beige) | Non-servicable | W2-class. Is a parts car for 496. Donated its trucks for car 916; trucks underwent refurbishment and were fitted to car 916 in February 2018. | |
| 737 | Brussels, Belgium | Operational | This car's original service career was spent on the Brussels, Belgium streetcar system as No. 7037, starting in 1952. Arrived in San Francisco in June 2004 and repainted in the blue-and-white paint scheme of the Verkehrsbetriebe Zürich, as Zürich, Switzerland, is a sister city of San Francisco, entering Muni service in 2005. Has seen only limited service because it has specialized parts and is a narrow streetcar, limiting capacity. | |
| 913 | New Orleans, Louisiana (Green) | Awaiting restoration | Originally built in 1923 as one of 73 in its class by Perley Thomas; sold as surplus in 1964 to the Orange Empire Railway Museum; purchased by Muni in 2005. | |
| 916 | Melbourne, Australia (Green/Beige) | Operational | SW6-class. Entered service in 1946; donated by State of Victoria to San Francisco in 2009. Awaited modifications necessary to operate on E and F line from 2009 to 2018. In early February 2018, No. 916 received its permanent trucks (from parts car No. 586) and final modifications. It awaits CPUC inspection. | |
| 952 | New Orleans, Louisiana (Green) | Under repair | Originally built in 1923 as one of 73 in its class by Perley Thomas; sold as surplus in 1964 and repurchased from Chattanooga by New Orleans in 1984. Retired again in 1997 when replaced by replica; leased to San Francisco in 1998. | |
| 3557 | Hamburg, Germany (Red/White) | Awaiting restoration | Built in 1954; V6E class. Retired in 1978 when the Hamburg streetcar system was abandoned; arrived in San Francisco in 1979. Delivered to City Hall as a surprise, leading to the headline "A Streetcar Named Undesirable". Last ran in 1992. Major structural revisions necessary for ADA requirements. | |

== Historical bus fleet ==
The following shows the buses previously operated by the SFMTA. Some of these coaches have been preserved in the historic fleet, donated to trolley museums, or auctioned.

| Model | Fleet Nos. (Year Built) | Preserved Unit(s) | Qty | Last retired | Image | Notes |
|---|---|---|---|---|---|---|
| Orion VII (30' HEV) | 8501-8530 (2007) | 8501 | 30 | 2025 | | |
| Neoplan AN440 | 8101 (1999); 8102-8235 (2000); 8301-8371 (2002) | 8350 | 206 | 2021 | | 34 buses were rebuilt in 2010–2011, and 80 more rebuilt in 2013. Pulled from revenue service in April 2020, and was used as reserve buses and COVID-19 patient medical transport until retired in early August-2021. |
| Orion VII (40' HEV) | 8401 (2006); 8402-8456 (2007) | 8426 | 56 | 2020 | | |
| ETI 14TrSF | 5401-5402 (1999); 5403-5640 (2001–2004) | 5538 | 240 | 2019 | | |
| Neoplan AN460 | 6200-6225 (2000), 6226-6299 (2001), 6401-6424 (2002) | None | 124 | 2018 | | Some units were rebuilt in 2010–2011. |
| NABI 416.12 | 8001-8045 (1999) | None | 45 | 2016 | | 8008, 8032, 8042 are privately preserved. |
| ETI 15TrSF | 7101 (2000), 7102-7133 (2003) | None | 33 | 2016 | | 2002 models |
| New Flyer Industries E60 | 7000-7059 (1992–1994) | 7031 | 60 | 2015 | | First 60-foot articulated trolleybus fleet. 7031 was planned to be auctioned in 2019, but the auction was withdrawn. |
| New Flyer Industries D60 | 9101-9124 (1990–1991) | 9120 | 24 | 2014 | | Second articulated bus fleet. 9120 was planned to be auctioned in 2019, but the auction was withdrawn. |
| Gillig Corporation Phantom 40' | 2801–2845 (1993) | 2840 (training only) | 45 | 2013 | | Bought from AC Transit in 2005 for reserve fleet. 2840 was planned to be auctioned in 2019, but the auction was withdrawn. It has been used as a training bus since April 2018. |
| Orion Bus Industries I Citycruiser | 9001-9045 (1990) | 9010 | 45 | 2008 | | 9030 was converted to Mobile Commander Center CC1. |
| New Flyer Industries D40 | 8801-8850 (1988), 8901-8956 (1989) | 8926 | 106 | 2007 | | |
| Flyer Industries E800 | 5003-5345 (1976–1977) | 5300, 5345 | 343 | 2007 | | 5148 is at Seashore Trolley Museum. |
| Flyer Industries D902 | 4500-4679 (1984) | 4574 | 180 | 2003 | | 4574 was damaged while being delivered. A second 4574 was built as a Flyer D901 and delivered in its place. |
| MAN AG SG-310-18-3A | 6000-6099 (1984) | 6099 | 100 | 2002 | | First 60-ft articulated bus. 6020 and 6090 are under private ownership and are commonly seen at Burning Man. |
| Flyer D900 | 3XXR, 6XXR (1980) | None | 110 | 2000 | | Bought from SamTrans in 1994; reserve fleet only. |
| Flyer E700A | 5001 (1972), 5002 (1973) | None | 2 | 1999 | | Pilot buses for later E800 fleet (5003-5345) |
| GM New Look | 3000-3389 (1969–1970) | 3287 | 390 | 1994 | | 3000, 3210, 3226, and others are under private ownership. 3270 is preserved at the Pacific Bus Museum. |
| Flxible New Look | 4000–4009 (1969) | 4009 | 10 | 1991 | | |
| AM General Metropolitan 9635-6 | 4100-4199 (1975) | 4154 | 100 | 1990 | | |
| Grumman 870 | 4030-4054 (1980) | None | 25 | 1985 | | Most were scrapped around 1986, though some remained as reserve buses until 1989. |
| Twin Coach 44TTW | 570-659 (1949–1950) | None | 90 | 1977 | | |
| St. Louis Car Company Job 1704/Job 1731 | 501-509 (1939), 510-525 (1947) | 506 | 25 | 1977 | | 501–509 were built in 1939 but not placed in service until 1941. |
| Marmon-Herrington TC40 | 526-549 (1948) | None | 25 | 1977 | | |
| Marmon-Herrington TC44 | 550–569, 660–710 (1948–1949) | None | 70 | 1977 | | |
| Marmon-Herrington TC48 | 711–849 (1950–1951) | 776 | 139 | 1977 | | |
| White 784 | 042-062 (1938) | 042 | 20 | 1975 | | 060 was bought by a private owner. |
| Mack C-49-DT | 2100–2199 (1955), 2200–2269 (1956), 2300–2369 (1957), 2400–2469 (1958), 2500–2569 (1959), 2600–2669 (1960) | 2230 | 450 | 1974 | | 2617 was bought by a private owner. |
| White 798 | 075-0155, 0166-0454 (1944–1948) | 0392, 0419 | 368 | 1969 | | |
| Twin Coach 44-D | 0156-0165 (1947) | 0163 | 10 | 1953 | San Francisco Municipal Railway, historic Twin Coach 44-D bus (fleet number 0163) at Muni Heritage Weekend 2023 | |
| ACF 26-S | 063–072 (1940) | None | 10 | | | |

== See also ==
- Bay Area Rapid Transit rolling stock
- Peter Witt streetcar
- US Standard Light Rail Vehicle
- Muni Metro
- Perley A. Thomas
- Jewett Car Company
- W.L. Holman Car Company
