= Petaluma and Santa Rosa Railway Powerhouse =

Petaluma and Santa Rosa Railroad Power House
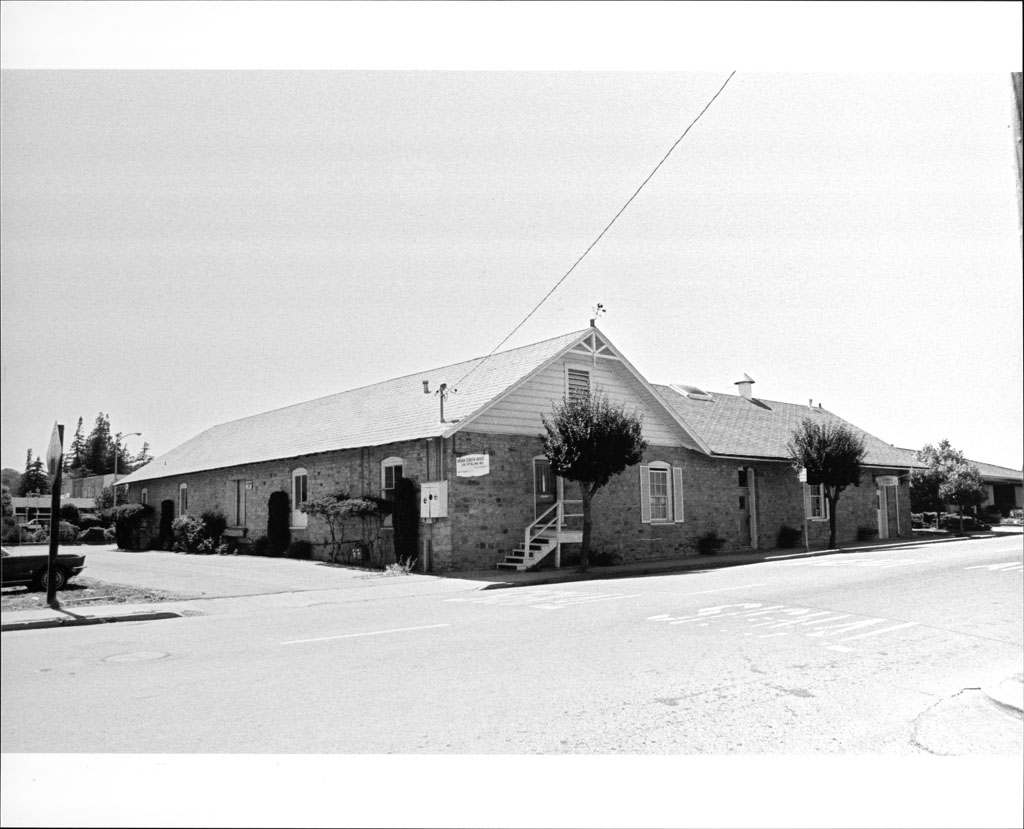
- Petaluma and Santa Rosa Railroad Powerhouse, Sebastopol, California

General information
- Location: 230 Petaluma Avenue, Sebastopol, California, United States
- Coordinates: 38.40129°N 122.82275°W
- Completed: 1903
- Client: Petaluma and Santa Rosa Railway

Technical details
- Structural system: stone and mortar
- Petaluma and Santa Rosa Railway Powerhouse
- U.S. National Register of Historic Places
- Location: 238--258 Petaluma Ave., Sebastopol, California
- Area: 0.4 acres (0.16 ha)
- Built by: C.A. Warren Construction Co.
- Architectural style: Late 19th and Early 20th Century American Movements
- NRHP reference No.: 91000918
- Added to NRHP: July 23, 1991

The Petaluma and Santa Rosa Railway Power House is a historic building in Sebastopol, California, U.S., built to serve the Petaluma and Santa Rosa Railroad, an electric interurban railway of Sonoma County. It is also known as the Hogan Building and the P&SR Substation. It was listed on the National Register of Historic Places in 1991.

It was deemed significant "as the first building constructed and the only building or structure remaining from Sonoma County's participation it what urban historian Raymond A Mohl has termed '[T]he most important transit innovation of the late 19th century ... [-] the electrification of street railways.' (The New City: Urban America in the Industrial Age f 1860-1920 [Arlington Heights, IL: Harlan Davidson, 1985], 34.) From its incorporation on June 20, 1903, until the last trolley lines were pulled down on May 31, 1947, the Petaluma and Santa Rosa Railway was Sonoma County's only electric interurban street railway system. The trackage, wires, and rolling stock are now gone. Only two visual reminders remain - P & SR Car 65, a passenger car constructed by San Francisco's Holman Car Company, which is in the Western Railway Museum at Rio Vista Junction; and the P & SR Power Station in Sebastopol. The Power Station is the only architectural reminder of this important facet of Sonoma County's transportation history; the only remaining symbol of the community's struggle to provide cheap, efficient, and modern service for both passengers and freight and simultaneously destroy the monopolistic hold of the Northwestern Pacific on both farmers and interurban commuters. It also represents the transition between the age of steam and the age of the internal combustion engine."

The Petaluma and Santa Rosa Railway Power House is located on Petaluma Avenue in Sebastopol, adjacent to the P&SR Depot on South Main Street. The building has been listed on the National Register of Historic Places since 1991.

== Description ==
The Petaluma and Santa Rosa Railway Power House is a single story building constructed of locally quarried stone. It is L-shaped, with a tile roof. Since the dissolution of the railway company, the building has housed a number of private business, including a series of brew pubs. The current owner, Hopmonk Tavern, removed a non-historical deck surrounding the east and west ends of the building, returning it to its historical profile.
