= Sebastopol station (Petaluma and Santa Rosa Railroad) =

- Sebastopol Depot of the Petaluma and Santa Rosa Railway
- U.S. National Register of Historic Places
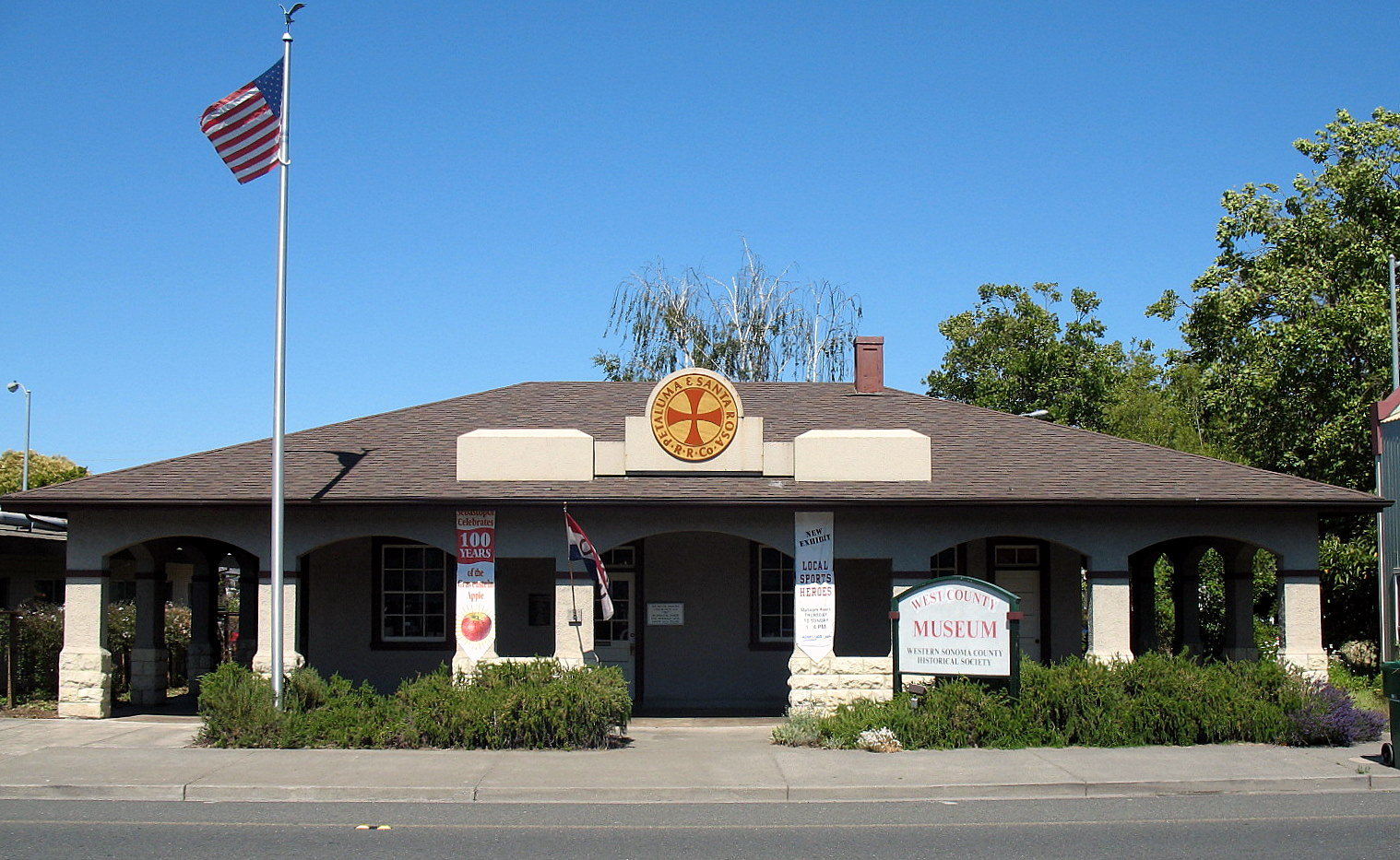
- The Depot now serving as a museum, 2010

- Location within California Location within the United States
- Location: 261 South Main Street; Sebastopol, California
- Coordinates: 38.400833°N 122.821944°W
- Built: 1917–1918
- Architect: Brainerd Jones
- Architectural style: Mission Revival
- NRHP reference No.: 96000109
- Added to NRHP: February 16, 1996

Sebastopol station was an interurban train station in Sebastopol, California. It was served by the Petaluma and Santa Rosa Railroad and was adjacent to the railway's powerhouse. Official operations ceased in 1932 with the rest of P&SR passenger service. It was leased as retail space for a time before being converted to a museum. The station was added to the National Register of Historic Places in 1996 as Sebastopol Depot of the Petaluma and Santa Rosa Railway.

== See also ==
- National Register of Historic Places listings in Sonoma County, California
