= Western Pacific 94 =

Preserved American 4-6-0 locomotive

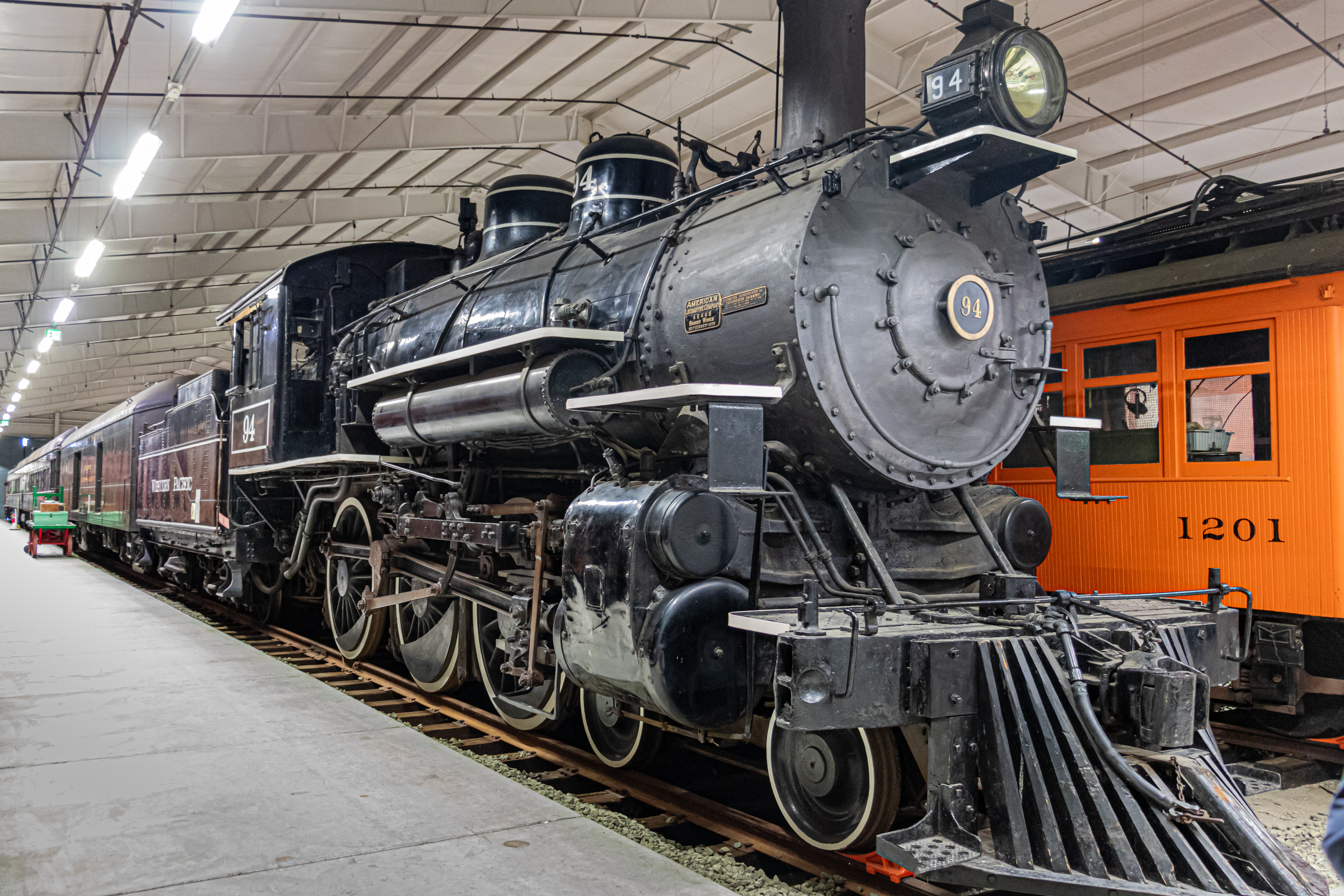
Type and origin
- Power type: Steam
- Builder: American Locomotive Company (Brooks Works)
- Serial number: 46448
- Build date: September 1909
Specifications
- Configuration
  - Whyte: 4-6-0
- Gauge: 4 ft 8 1/2 in (1,435 mm)
- Driver dia.: 68 in (1,727 mm)
- Adhesive weight: 135,000 lb (61.2 tonnes)
- Loco weight: 181,000 lb (82.1 tonnes)
- Tender weight: 132,000 lb (59,874.2 kilograms) (empty)
- Total weight: 313,000 lb (142.0 tonnes)
- Water cap.: 7,000 US gal (26,000 L; 5,800 imp gal)
- Firebox
  - Grate area: 33.60 sq ft (3.122 m^{2})
- Boiler pressure: 200 lbf/in^{2} (1.38 MPa)
- Heating surface
  - Firebox: 228 sq ft (21 m^{2})
- Cylinders: Two
Performance figures
- Tractive effort: 29,093 lbf (129.41 kN)
- Factor of adh.: 4.64
Career
- Operators: Western Pacific Railway
- Class: TP-29
- Number in class: 24
- Retired: 1960 (revenue service); 1986 (excursion service)
- Restored: 1979
- Disposition: On Display at the Western Railway Museum.

Western Pacific 94 is a preserved TP-29 class 4-6-0 Ten Wheeler type steam locomotive built in September 1909 by the American Locomotive Company for the Western Pacific Railroad. It is preserved on display at the Western Railway Museum in Suisun City, California. This steam locomotive pulled the first westbound passenger train on the Feather River Route.

== History ==
The 94 was one of 21 locomotives in the 86 class ordered from the American Locomotive Company. Shipped from its Brooks Works at Dunkirk, New York, on September 28, 1909. It was accepted by the Western Pacific at Salt Lake City, Utah, in 1909.

The locomotive was the motive power for the first westbound passenger train, the Press Representative Special in 1910; it pulled the train from Portola to Oroville, through the Feather River Canyon.

The locomotive was a typical passenger steam locomotive for the Western Pacific used from the start of operations in 1910 until after World War II. She was used as motive power for passenger trains such as the Scenic Limited, the Royal Gorge, the Exposition Flyer, and the Feather River Express.

The locomotive was retired from active service on the WP in the 1940s. Public Relations Manager Gilbert Kneiss recommended to upper management at the WP that this locomotive be preserved due to its historical significance.

It was given a mechanical overhaul at the railroad's shops in 1949.

The locomotive attended the Western Pacific's Golden Spike Ruby Jubilee ceremony at Keddie, California, on November 1, 1949. In 1953, as part of a more intensive cosmetic restoration, it was repainted to represent its original paint scheme with gold lettering and striping. It was also given a replacement tender from a previously retired locomotive of the same wheel arrangement.

The locomotive was used for many excursions and special events along the Western Pacific System, and was often based out of the Oakland Roundhouse.

In August 1959, the locomotive was part of a train used for three days by the Walt Disney Company in production of its film Pollyanna, at St. Helena, on the Southern Pacific's Calistoga Branch, lettered for the fictional Watertown and Eastern Railroad. It appears in opening and closing scenes of the film.

Later that fall in 1959, both the 94 and 0-6-0 number 165 were used to provide stationary steam for cannery operations at Escalon on the WP subsidiary Tidewater Southern.

On August 22, 1960, the WP celebrated the 50th anniversary of passenger service with the 94 bringing a three car train from Oakland to Niles (Fremont), where the engine was place on the point of the California Zephyr for the return to Oakland. After 55 years on the Western Pacific, 94 was donated to the Maritime Museum in San Francisco in 1964, in 1966 the engine was placed in storage at Key System's Maintenance Building.

In 1979, the Western Railway Museum leased the 94 from the San Francisco Maritime Museum Association, and the engine was moved from Oakland to Rio Vista Junction in April of that year. By the end of 1979, the locomotive was under steam at the museum. It was used in excursion service for the Museum until 1986.

As of 2024, No. 94 is on static display inside the Western Railway Museum. As with any steam locomotive of this age, it would require extensive work to meet current codes for safe operation. The Museum has no plans to return it to operation at this time.
