= W. L. Holman Car Company =

Jeumont-Schnedier
- Company type: Subsidiary
- Industry: Rail transport
- Founded: 1813; 213 years ago
- Defunct: 1914
- Fate: Defunct
- Headquarters: San Jose, California, USA
- Area served: Worldwide
- Products: Locomotives; High-speed trains Intercity and commuter trains Trams; People movers Signalling systems

W. L. Holman Car Company was a streetcar and cable car manufacturer based in San Francisco, California. It mainly built equipment for rail operation, including San Francisco Municipal Railway's first publicly owned streetcar, and some of the cable cars still operating on San Francisco's California Street line. Holman also constructed heavy interurban coaches and combines (combined passenger and freight-express cars) that ran on inland California electric railroads including Petaluma and Santa Rosa Railroad, Sacramento Northern Railway, and Central California Traction Company, as well as the Sierra Railroad, a Common Carrier line which operated out of Jamestown, California.

Holman declared bankruptcy in 1914. Some classic Holman cars are in the possession of the Western Railway Museum at Rio Vista, California. Another example is Ocean Shore Railroad passenger car 1409 currently under restoration by the Pacifica Historical Society.

== See also ==
- F Market & Wharves
- List of tram builders
- Sacramento Northern Railroad
- Central California Traction
- Western Railway Museum
