= Petaluma and Santa Rosa Railroad =

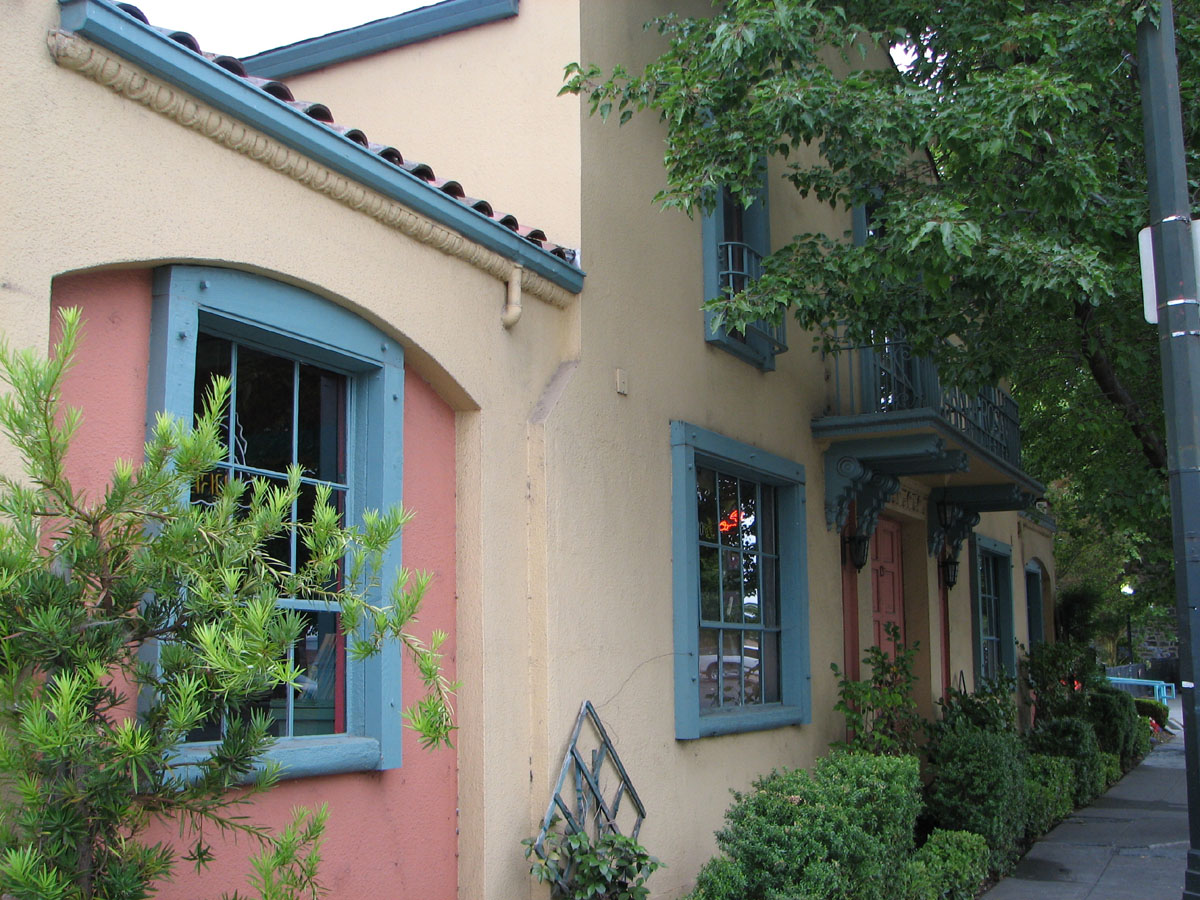
- The Petaluma & Santa Rosa Railroad Station at Railroad Square, Santa Rosa

Overview
- Status: dismantled
- Locale: Sonoma County, California

Service
- Type: interurban

History
- Opened: December 1, 1904
- Closed: July 1, 1932 (passenger)

Technical
- Track gauge: 4 ft 8 1/2 in (1,435 mm) standard gauge
- Electrification: Overhead line, 600 V DC

Petaluma and Santa Rosa Railroad was a 600 volt DC electric interurban railway in Sonoma County, California, United States. It operated between the cities of Petaluma, Sebastopol, Forestville, and Santa Rosa. Company-owned steamboats provided service between Petaluma and San Francisco.

Portions of the original right-of-way have been acquired by Sonoma County government for the West County Trail and Joe Rodota Trail, managed by the Sonoma County Regional Parks Department. A portion of the original right-of-way can be found along the waterfront in Petaluma. Efforts have been made by volunteers to re-activate this line to become a trolley line once again.

== History ==
On June 20, 1903, the Santa Rosa Street Railway, the Union Street Railway of Santa Rosa, the Petaluma Street Railroad, and the Central Street Railway were consolidated to form the Petaluma and Santa Rosa Railway. The four consolidated horse car lines built between 1888 and 1891 were to be replaced by an electric railroad operated in conjunction with the Steamer Gold which had been providing ferry service between Petaluma and San Francisco since 1883. A first-spike ceremony was held on April 5, 1904, at the Steamer Gold landing at the foot of Copeland Street. The electric line was completed to Sebastopol in October, and extended along Sebastopol road toward the western edge of Santa Rosa.

The construction crew needed to cross the north–south steam railroad to reach downtown Santa Rosa. The steam railroad had operated a parallel branch line from Santa Rosa to Sebastopol since 1890, and would not consent to the crossing allowing a new competitor to offer direct service downtown. By November the steam railroad stationed guards at the proposed crossing site to prevent cutting of its rails. Trolley service began to the west side of the crossing on December 1, 1904. Rails were laid on the east side of the steam railroad tracks, and an electric wire was strung overhead in preparation for installing the crossing. A threatened boycott of the steam railroad by 92 Santa Rosa merchants had no effect.

=== The Battle of Sebastopol Road ===
A crossing was prefabricated in Sebastopol and loaded on a flat car pushed to the crossing location, but when the interurban crew arrived to install the crossing on January 3, 1905, they found a pair of steam locomotives on either side of the crossing fitted with steam nozzles to spray hot water on anyone approaching the crossing site. The interurban construction crew retreated.

The following day the regularly scheduled interurban car #57 arrived secretly carrying the construction crew. Before the steam railway could respond, the crew laid a temporary track across and over the steam rails and had a team of horses pull trolley #57 across to serve downtown Santa Rosa. The steam railroad then obtained a temporary injunction from a San Francisco judge prohibiting installation of the crossing. For a few weeks, passengers from Sebastopol were required to depart their arriving trolley and walk over the steam railroad to reboard trolley #57 for the remainder of the trip.

The injunction was dissolved in late February and the interurban construction crew assembled again to install the crossing on March 1, 1905. The steam railroad appeared to be unaware of the status of their injunction, and so their locomotives again discouraged the construction crew with hot water. A special steam railroad train arrived with 150 San Francisco waterfront thugs hired to discourage the interurban crew. The steam railroad also had a flat car loaded with gravel on hand for their men to fill in the excavation as soon as the interurban crew tried to dig out the crossing site. Tempers flared and several hundred Santa Rosa citizens assembled to watch the entertainment. Santa Rosa police ultimately restored order, and the crossing was installed that evening.

=== Expansion ===
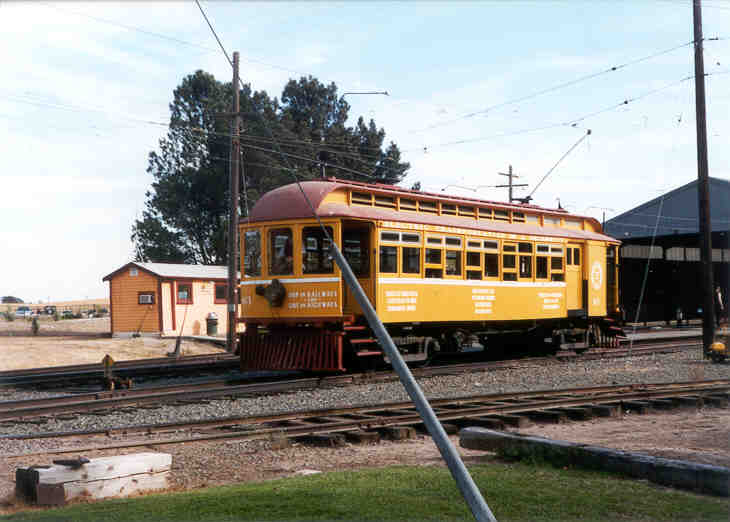
Restored P&SR Car at the Western Railway Museum

With the main line from Petaluma to Santa Rosa in operation, a branch line extended service from Sebastopol to Forestville on July 15, 1905. The 1906 San Francisco earthquake cancelled plans for additional extensions to Tomales, Dillon Beach, Geyserville, Healdsburg, Sonoma, Napa, and a closer San Francisco ferry connection on Point Pedro near San Rafael; and completion of a branch line from Liberty to Two Rock was delayed until July 28, 1913. Economic recovery from the quake allowed purchase of the steamer Resolute in 1912, and it was rebuilt as Petaluma to allow two daily ferry connections in 1914. Steamer Gold burned on November 29, 1920, but was replaced by the steamer Fort Bragg (renamed Gold).

=== Decline ===
Passenger service on the Two Rock branch was discontinued on September 30, 1925, after monthly passenger revenues on the branch dropped from $400 to $27. A new passenger and freight depot was built in Santa Rosa in 1927. The Santa Rosa line was dismantled from McDonald Avenue to Olive Street in 1931. The Petaluma & Santa Rosa was purchased by Northwestern Pacific Railroad (NWP) in 1932 and all trolley passenger service ended on July 1 of that year. Ferry passenger service was discontinued in 1935, but both ferries continued to carry freight until Gold was scrapped in 1940. Petaluma made the last ferry trip on August 24, 1950. The Santa Rosa line was dismantled from Olive Street to Stop 45 junction with the NWP Sebastopol branch in 1946 and from Stop 45 to Leddy junction with the NWP branch in 1947. Electric operation ended when Motor #1008 brought a carload of horses to Liberty on January 24, 1947. Diesel locomotives replaced the electric motors which were burned at Sacramento on March 15, 1947. The Two Rock branch was dismantled in 1952, and the Forestville line was shortened by 1-mile (1.6 km) to Ross in 1961. Southern Pacific Railroad diesel locomotives replaced the last Petaluma and Santa Rosa diesel in 1966. The Forestville line was shortened by another mile to the Sebastopol Apple Growers' Union (SAGU) plant in 1969. Eight miles of track were abandoned between Denman and Turner in 1973, and four more miles of track were abandoned between Turner and Alten in 1978. Sonoma County supervisors directed the parks department to acquire portions of the abandoned right-of-way as the line from Santa Rosa to Sebastopol was abandoned between 1984 and 1989. NWP continued using the southern end of the line to serve local industries in Petaluma.

== Route ==
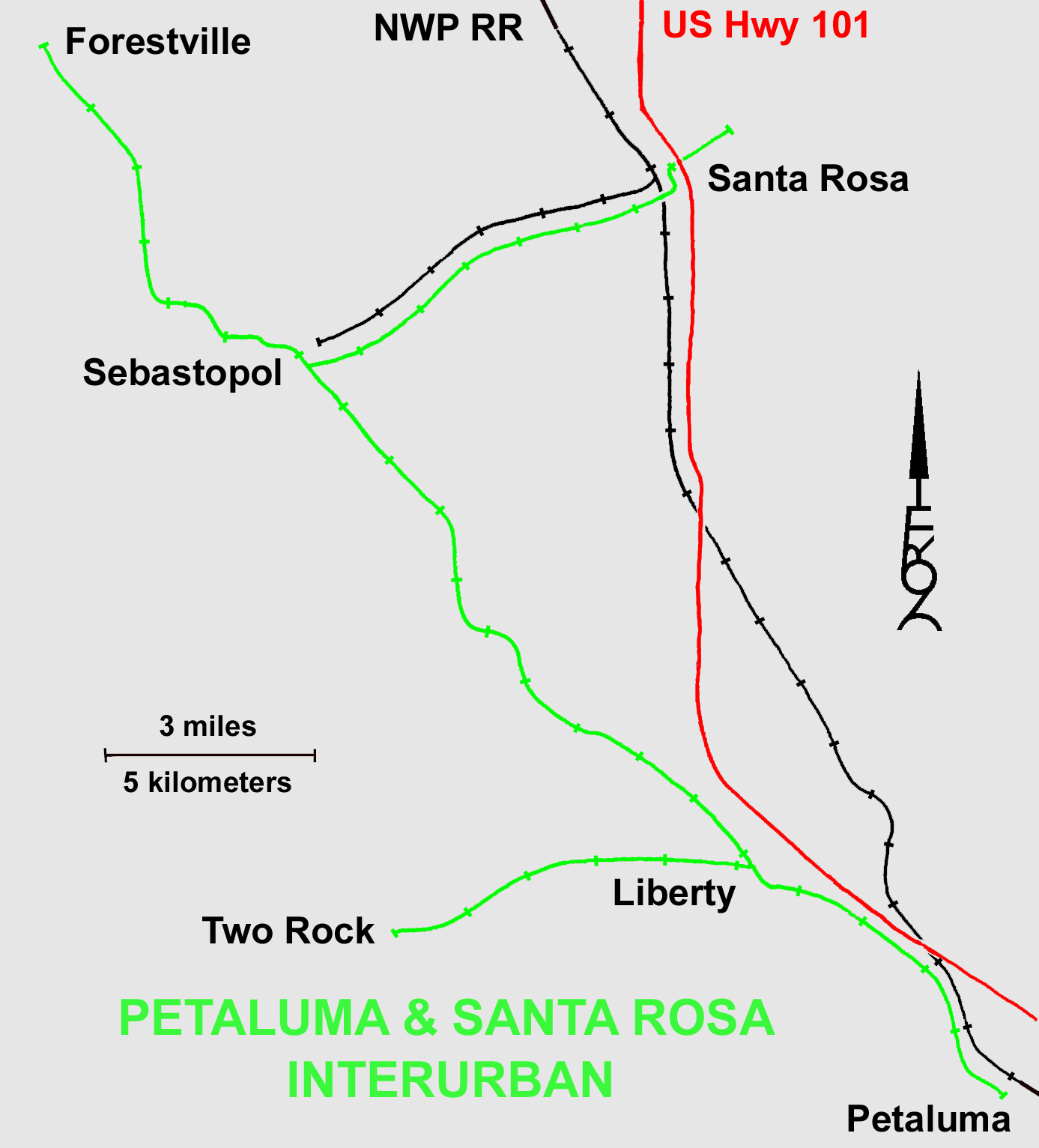
Petaluma & Santa Rosa route with Northwestern Pacific Railroad and U.S. Route 101 shown for reference.

From south to north:

- Milepost 0 – Petaluma
- Milepost 3.6 – Denman
- Milepost 5.1 – Liberty – branch west to: Cherry (MP 7.7) and Two Rock (MP 10.4)
- Milepost 7.9 – Stony Point
- Milepost 9.4 – Roblar
- Milepost 9.6 – Quarry
- Milepost 10.9 – Orchard
- Milepost 11.3 – Turner
- Milepost 13.2 – Cunningham
- Milepost 14.9 – Alten
- Milepost 16.7 – Sebastopol – branch east to: Leddy (MP 20.2), Stop 45 (MP 22.6), and Santa Rosa (MP 23.4)
- Milepost 20.9 – Graton
- Milepost 23.8 – Forestville

== Roster of passenger rolling stock ==
Number	Builder	Type	Date	Length	Notes
51	American Car Company	Motor	1904	47 ft 9 in	retired 1933
53	American Car Company	Motor	1904	47 ft 9 in	retired 1933
55	American Car Company	Motor	1904	47 ft 9 in	became inspection car in 1932 retired 1941
57	American Car Company	Motor	1904	47 ft 9 in	became inspection car in 1932 retired 1941
59	W. L. Holman Car Company	Motor	1904	44 ft	retired 1932
61	W. L. Holman Car Company	Motor	1904	44 ft	retired 1932
63	W. L. Holman Car Company	Motor	1904	44 ft	retired 1932 preserved Western Railway Museum
65	W. L. Holman Car Company	Motor	1904	44 ft	retired 1932
67	W. L. Holman Car Company	Motor	1904	44 ft	retired 1932
69	W. L. Holman Car Company	Motor	1904	44 ft	converted to express trailer in 1919 retired 1932
71	W. L. Holman Car Company	Trailer	1905	44 ft	retired 1929
73	W. L. Holman Car Company	Trailer	1905	44 ft	retired 1929
01	W. L. Holman Car Company	Express Trailer	1916		built as #8 express motor demotorized 1917 designated express trailer 1920 retired 1933

== Roster of freight motors ==
Number	Builder	Type	Date	Works Number	Notes
8	W. L. Holman Car Company	Express Motor	1916		demotorized as line car #4 in 1917 redesignated express trailer #01 in 1920
100	Baldwin Locomotive Works	Motor	1912		leased from Southern Pacific Railroad Company 1933–1941
502	American Car Company	Motor	1917		purchased from Kansas City – Kays Valley Railroad 1920 retired 1946
504	Ocean Shore Railroad	Motor	1917		purchased from Ocean Shore Railroad 1921 retired 1947
506	Petaluma & Santa Rosa RR	Motor	1923		built from Sacramento Northern Railroad frame #1000 with motors from Ocean Shore Railroad retired 1947
1002	W. L. Holman Car Company	Motor	1904		rebuilt as steeple cab in 1920 and as cabless multiple unit slave #1004B in 1928 retired 1947
1004	W. L. Holman Car Company	Motor	1904		rebuilt as steeple cab in 1920 and renumbered 1004A with multiple unit controls in 1928 retired 1947
1006	W. L. Holman Car Company	Motor	1904		rebuilt as steeple cab in 1920 and as cabless multiple unit slave #1008B in 1929 retired 1947
1008	W. L. Holman Car Company	Motor	1904		rebuilt as steeple cab in 1920 and renumbered #1008A with multiple unit controls in 1929 retired 1947
1010	Petaluma & Santa Rosa R.R.	Motor	1917		Flat car rebuilt with motors from Express Motor #8 sold to City of San Francisco 1921 repurchased 1930 retired 1947
1	General Electric	GE 44-ton switcher	1946	28338	became Southern Pacific Railroad #1904 in 1958
2	General Electric	GE 44-ton switcher	1942	15034	ex-Lehigh Valley Railroad #61 then Rio Grande and Eagle Pass Railroad #10 acquired 1946 became Southern Pacific Railroad #1905 in 1958
3	General Electric	GE 44-ton switcher	1943	17928	built as San Francisco and Napa Valley Railroad #50 for work in the Mare Island Naval Shipyard; became Southern Pacific #203 in 1956; acquired 1958; retired 1964
4	General Electric	GE 44-ton switcher	1945	27817	ex-Southern Pacific #1903 acquired 1958 retired 1966

The company roster included 89 conventional freight cars (unpowered trailers) in 1931.

== See also ==
- Petaluma and Santa Rosa Railway Powerhouse
- William Ashburner Cattell (1803–1920), president, Petaluma and Santa Rosa Railroad
