= Western Railway Museum =

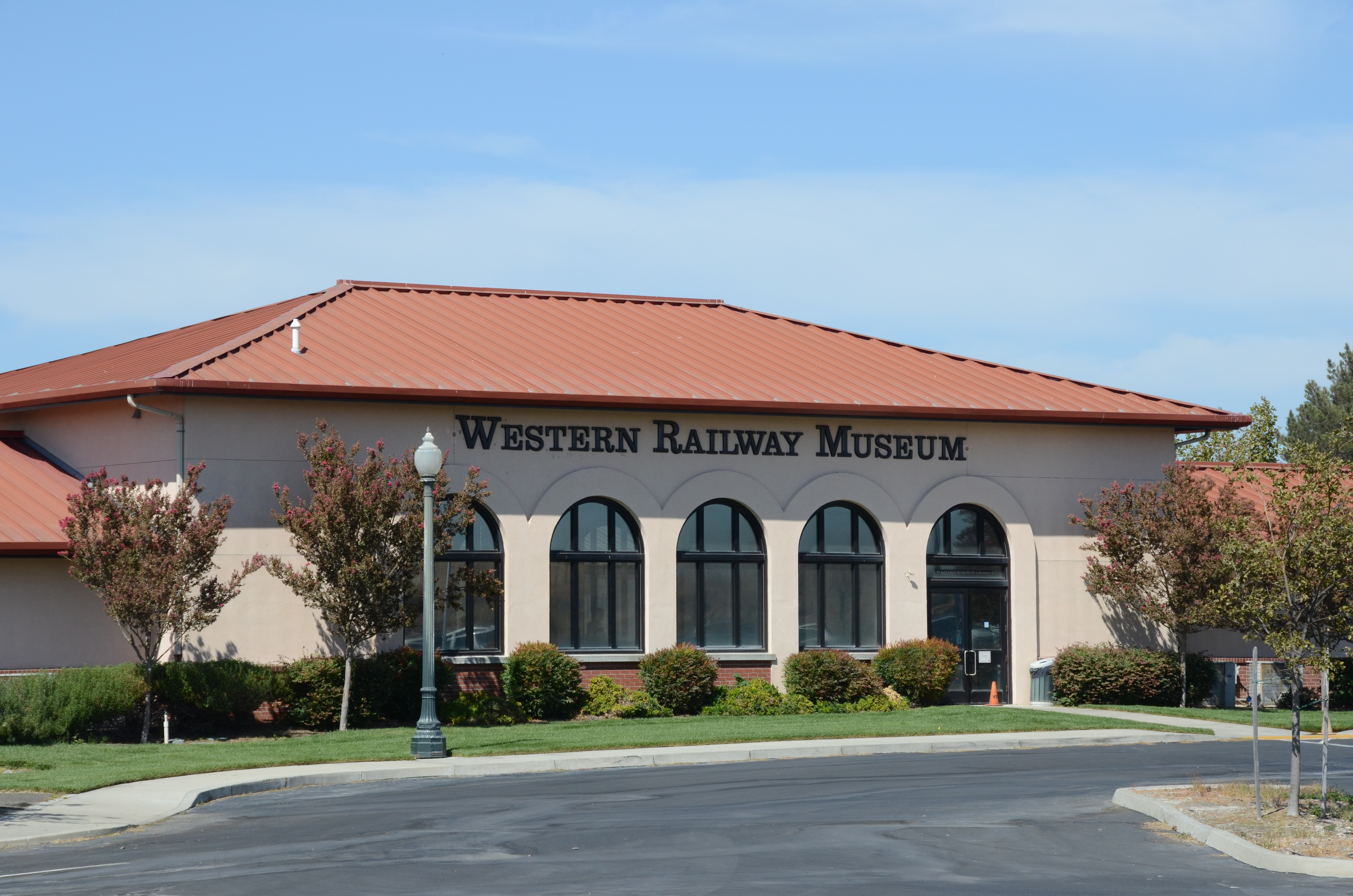
- Former name: California Railway Museum
- Established: 1960s
- Location: 5848 State Highway 12, Suisun City, California
- Type: Railroad museum
- Chairperson: Alex Mahshi
- Curator: Allan Fisher
- Owner: Bay Area Electric Railroad Association
- Website: www.wrm.org

- Sacramento Northern Railway Historic District
- U.S. National Register of Historic Places
- Location within California
- Location: 5848 CA Hwy 12, Suisun City, California
- Coordinates: 38°12′12″N 121°52′28″W
- NRHP reference No.: 12000402
- Added to NRHP: July 11, 2012

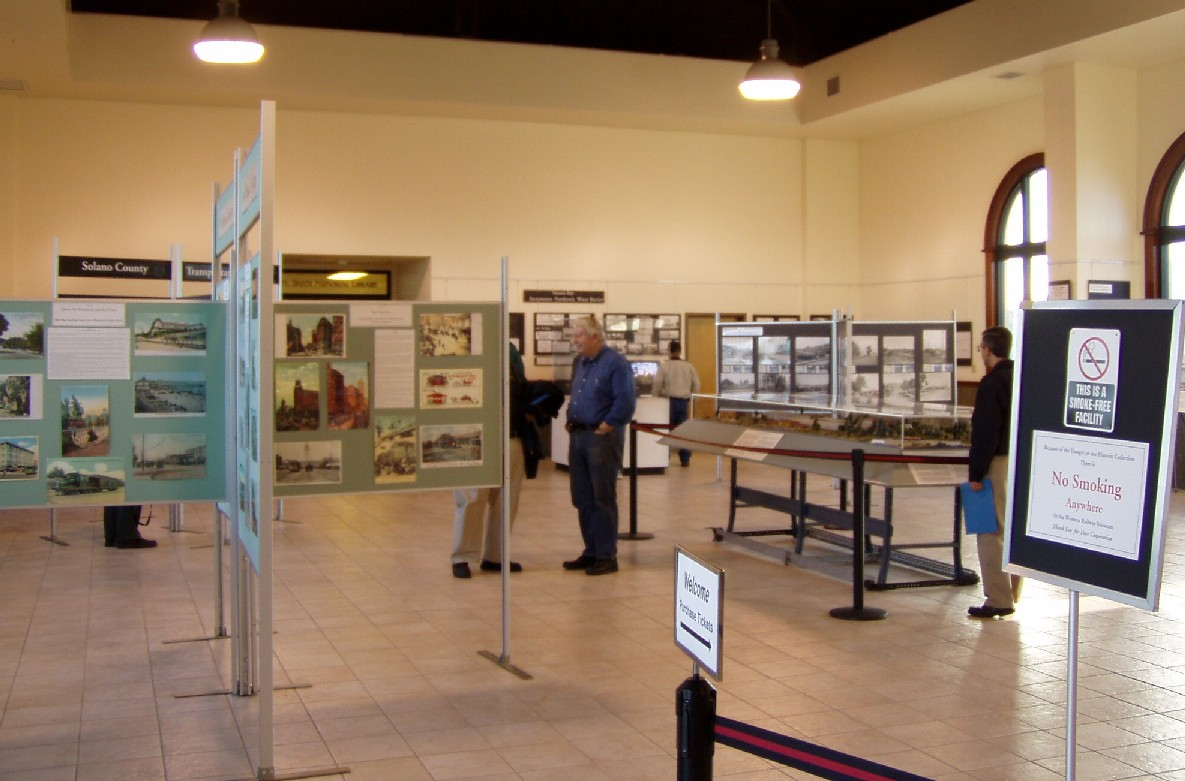
A view of the Western Railway Museum gallery

The Western Railway Museum, in Solano County, California, United States is located on Highway 12 between Rio Vista and Suisun. The museum is built along the former mainline of the Sacramento Northern Railway. Their collection focuses on trolleys, as it is primarily a museum of interurban transit equipment.

The Western Railway Museum has the largest collection of Sacramento Northern Railway equipment in existence, and the museum also operates a line of the former Sacramento Northern as a heritage railway with scheduled excursions for visitors.

Originally named the California Railway Museum, it was renamed the Western Railway Museum at the beginning of 1985. The museum is operated by the Bay Area Electric Railroad Association (BAERA), a non-profit organization.

== History ==
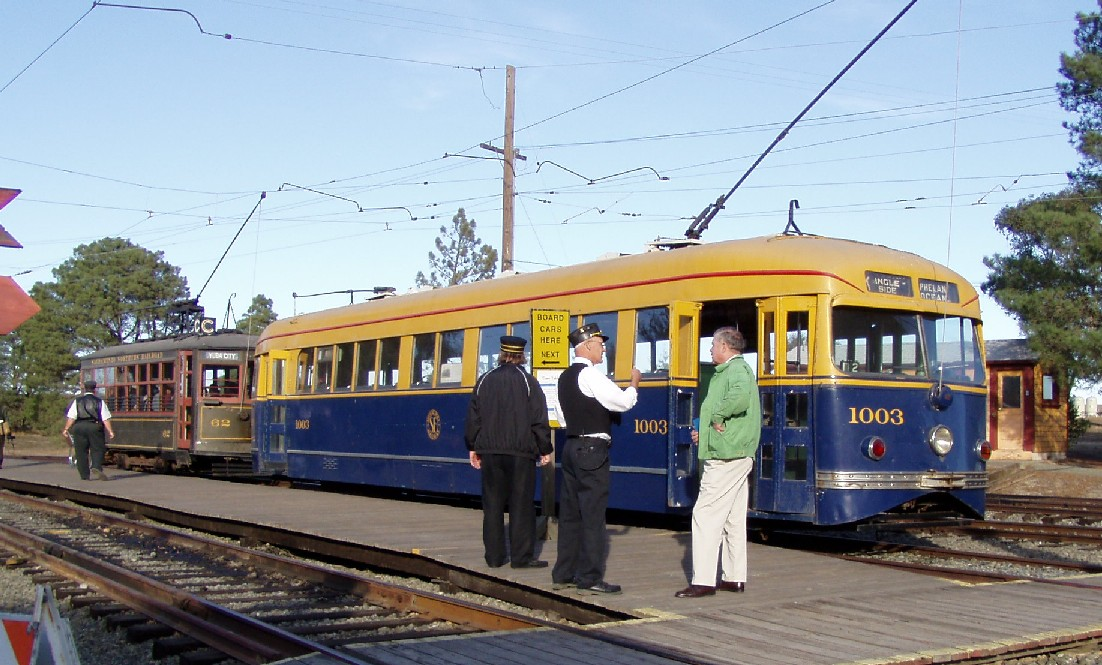
left: Birney streetcar and right: San Francisco Municipal Railway Magic Carpet Streetcar 1003: trolleys with motormen and visitors, 2006.

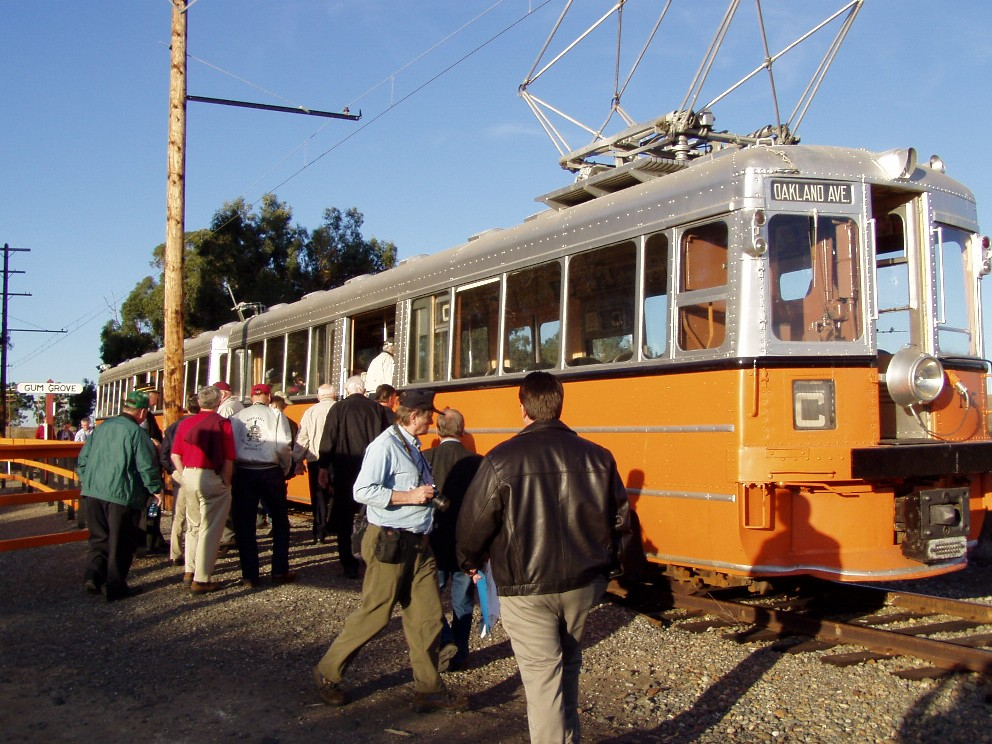
Key System 187 on the interurban track

The Bay Area Electric Railroad Association was started by a group of San Francisco Bay Area rail fans in 1946. The group was specifically interested in electric traction, more than main line railroads. Other groups such as the California/Nevada Historical Society usually had meetings and excursions on main line subjects. BAERA held monthly social meetings, frequently showing members slides and movies to the group. The BAERA also had excursions on the many street car lines and Interurbans in the Bay Area. As a result of an excursion over the Key System the Association purchased Key System 271 a wooden street car that had started out in Lehigh Valley, Pennsylvania. Soon other cars were given by members or purchased for the Association. These included Sacramento Northern 62, a Birney street car built in 1920. The car ran local service in Chico, California until 1947 and had the last 5-cent fare in the State of California.

A number of passenger and work cars were obtained when the Key System abandoned operation of its last rail line across the Bay Bridge in 1958. But time, money and effort needed in constantly moving the equipment from place to place convinced the members that a permanent location for their railway museum was needed. Property was located at Rio Vista Junction, a former station stop along the Sacramento Northern Railway near Suisun, California in 1960. BAERA became a 501(c)(3) non-profit educational corporation in the 1960s, and created as its major project the California Railway Museum. At the beginning of 1985, the museum was renamed the Western Railway Museum, to avoid confusion with the California State Railroad Museum. Significant events at the Western Railway Museum include: purchase of 22 miles of Sacramento Northern in 1994, dedication of a Visitors Center in 2001, and starting in 2002, construction of the Loring Jensen Memorial Car House with attendant fire suppression system, officially opened in May 2008.

The Association also publishes a quarterly newsletter called the Review.

== Collection ==
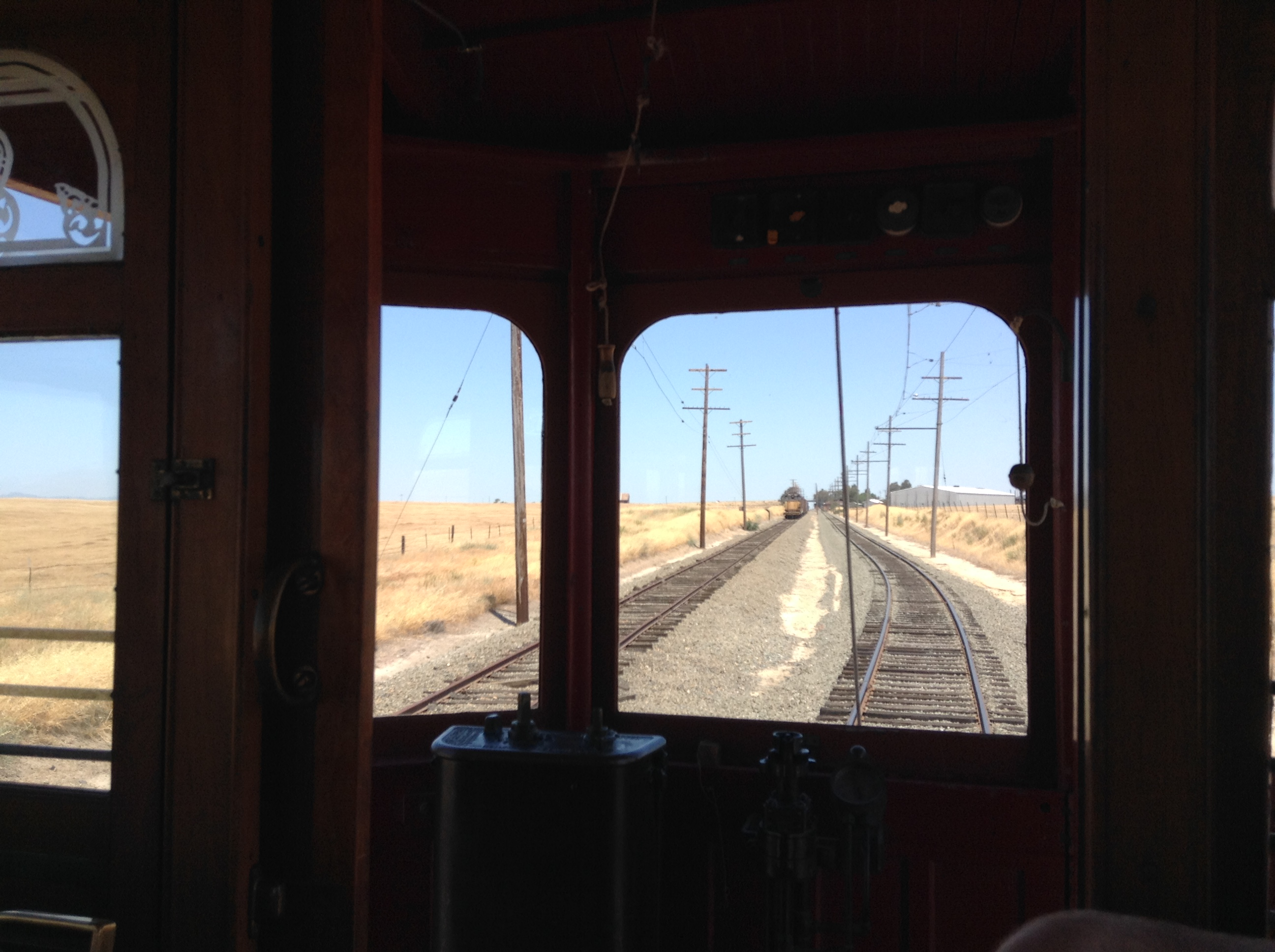
View from Western Railway Museum car, Petaluma and Santa Rosa #63

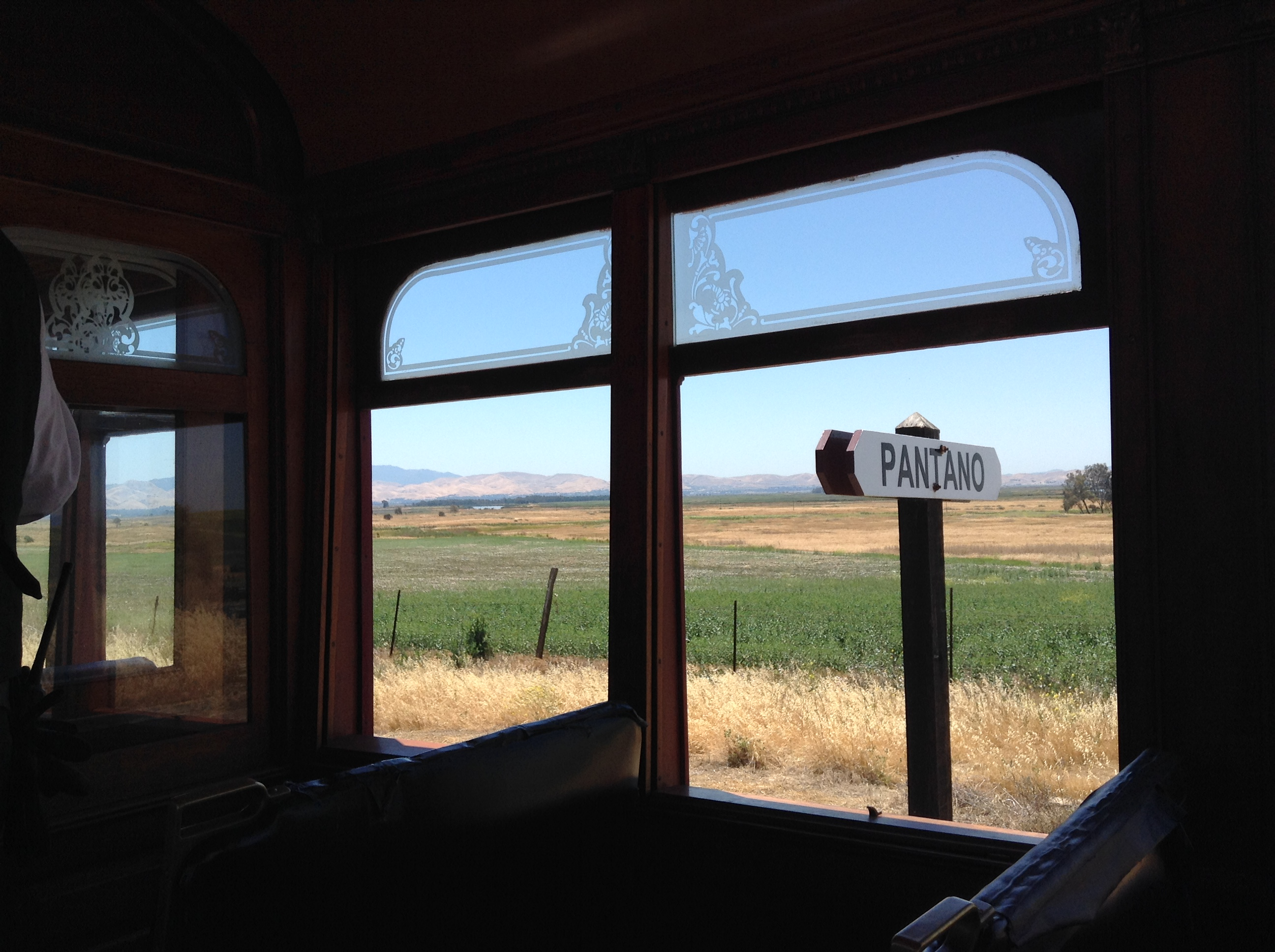
View of Pantano stop from a Western Railway Museum train

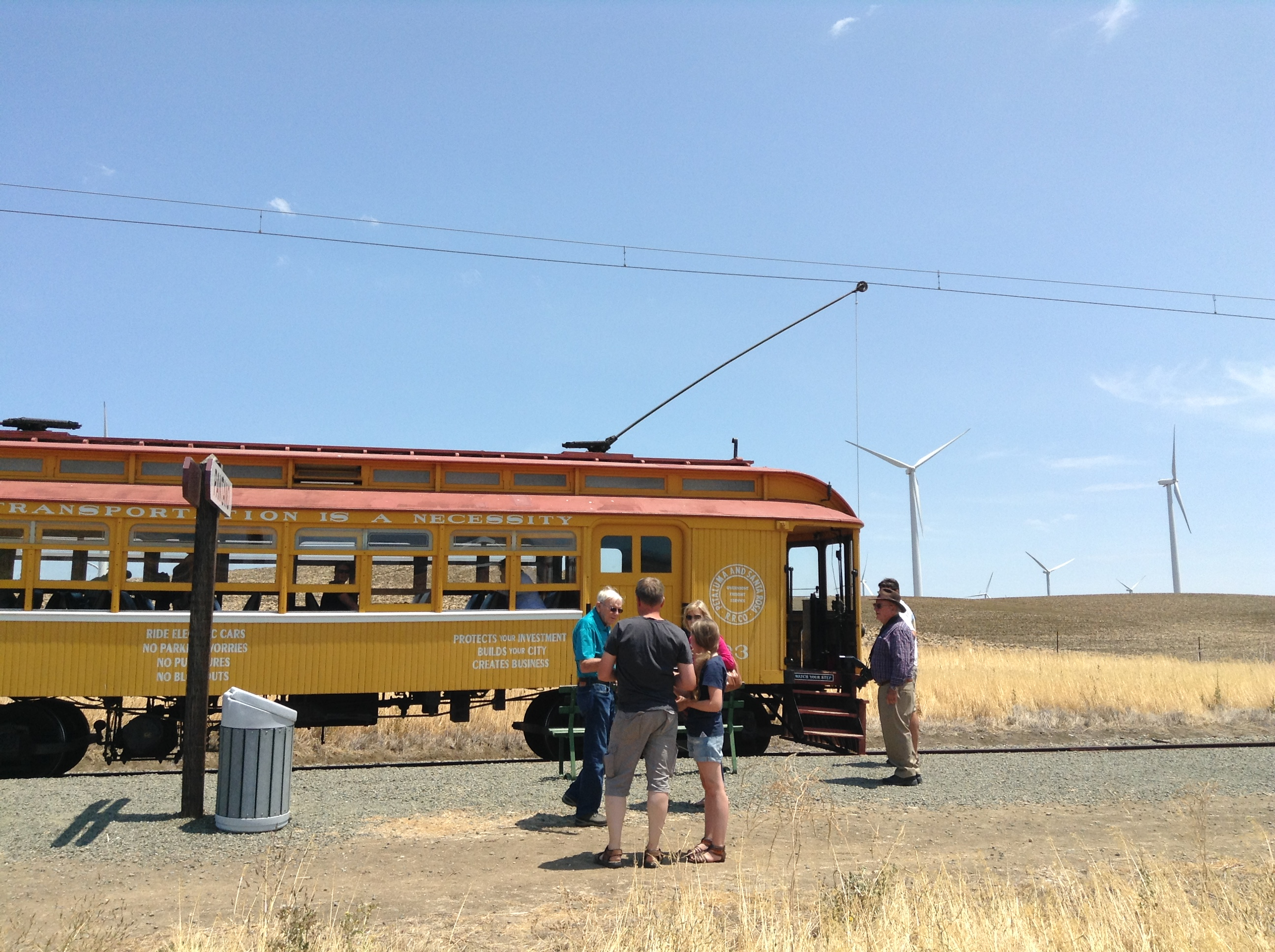
Passengers stand outside of Petaluma and Santa Rosa #63, from the Western Railway Museum

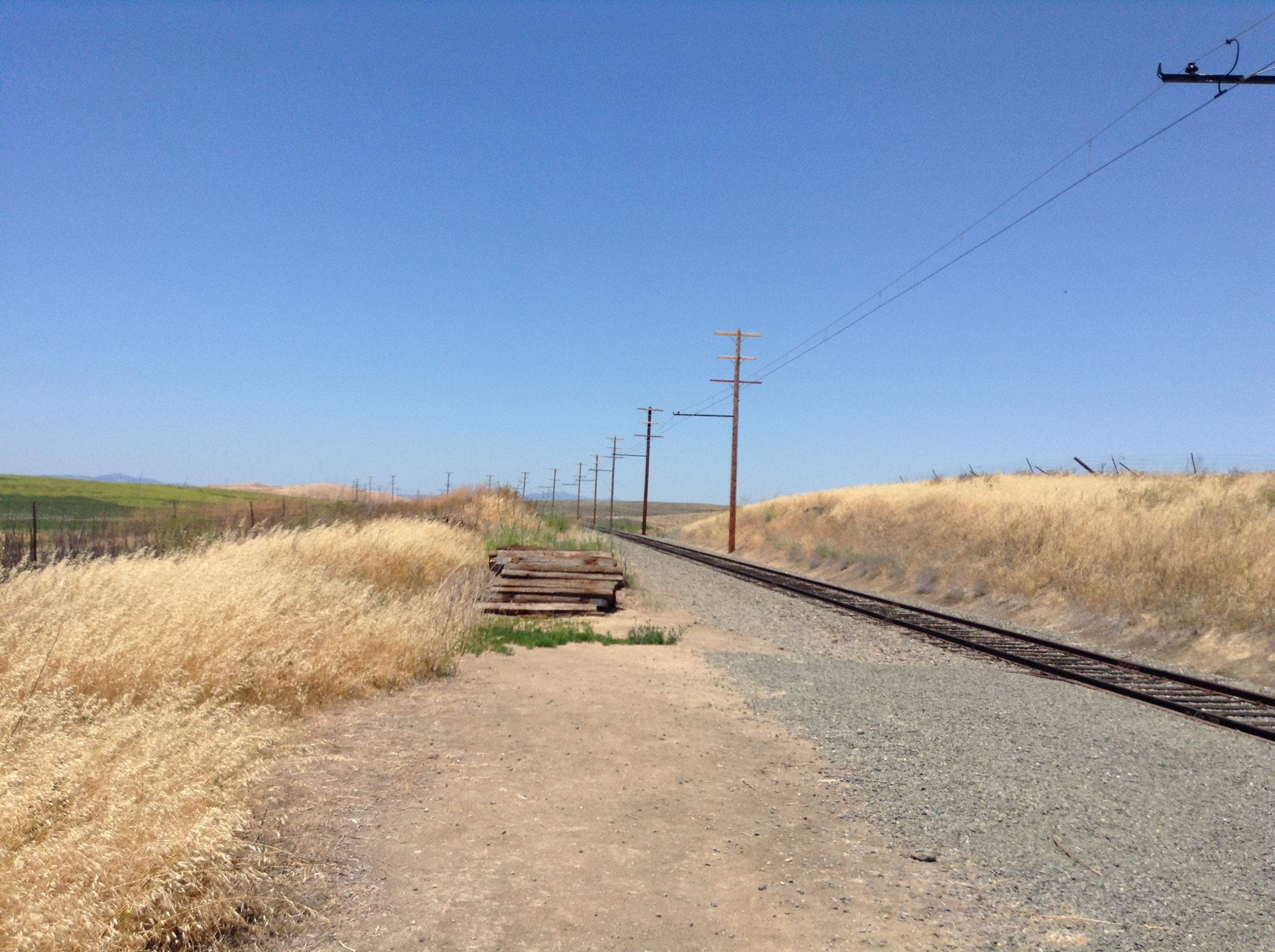
View of tracks from Pantano stop on Western Railway Museum train line

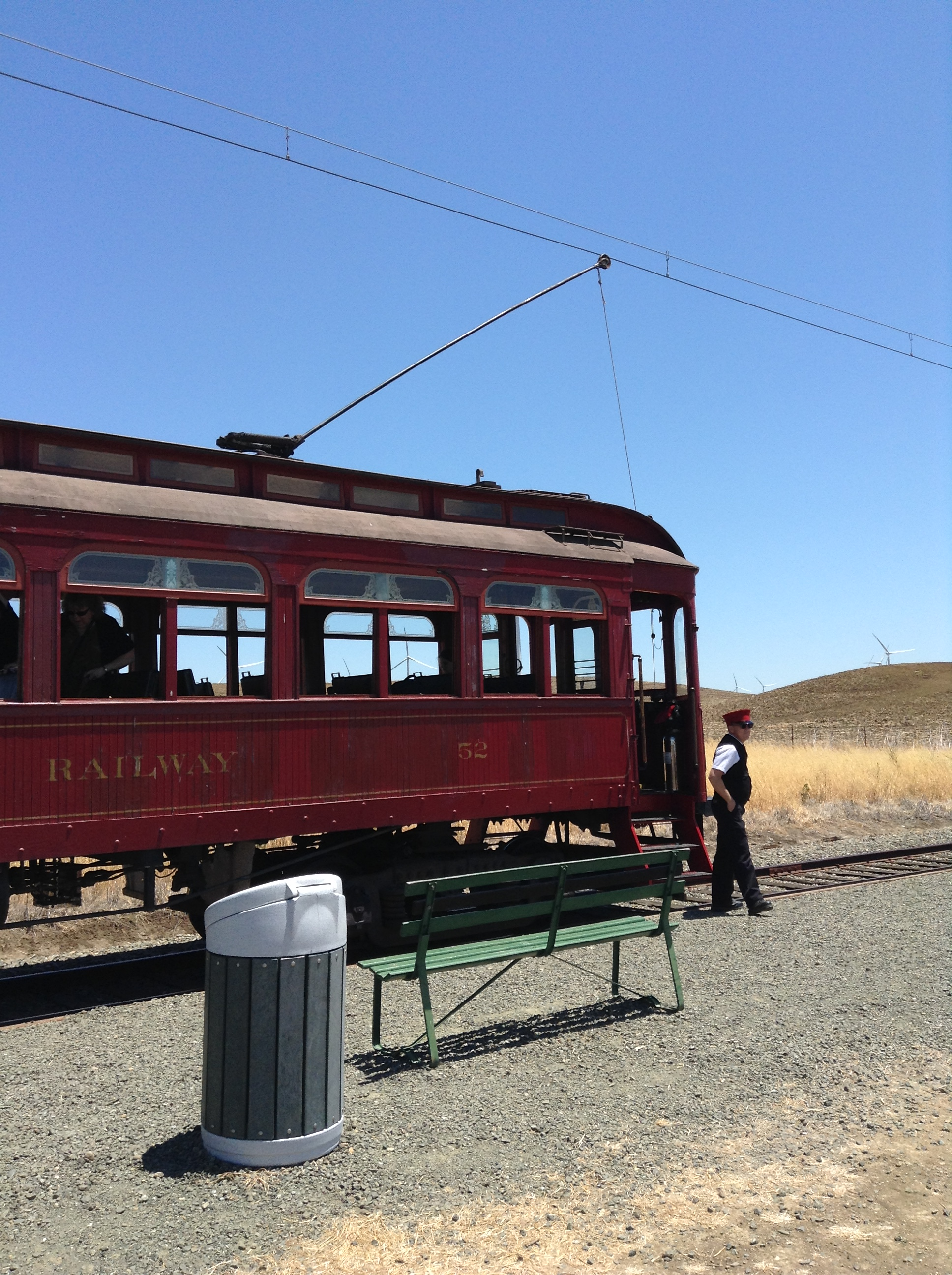
A conductor stands in front of Peninsular Railway #52, from the Western Railway Museum in Solano County

The BAERA maintains a substantial archive of materials relating to street railway, interurban lines, and steam railroads of California and adjacent states. The archive occupies a climate controlled space in one of the newer buildings.

The Association owns about 100 pieces of railroad equipment, mainly from the electric railroads of the West, but also several Western Pacific Railroad pieces including two steam locomotives. Equipment is in a wide range of conditions, and some equipment is maintained fully operational. For example, Petaluma and Santa Rosa 63, Peninsular Railway 52, Salt Lake and Utah 751, and Sacramento Northern 62.

The interurban car Sacramento Northern 1005 (originally Oakland, Antioch and Eastern 1005) has been a focus of restoration activity in the last 10 years. The BAERA operated many excursions in its early years, and this car was used quite frequently. It was often hauled around in freight trains to reach an excursion site, and sometimes suffered damage in these trips, including a badly bent frame in June 1962. The damage has been repaired and the car has been restored to its 1934 configuration.

=== Passenger/Interurban cars ===
Interurban Car	Condition	Notes
Bamberger #400	Awaiting restoration	
Bay Area Rapid Transit A-Car #1164	Display	Acquired 2024. 1,676 mm (5 ft 6 in) broad gauge, and runs on Third rail with 1 kV DC, which is incompatible with the museum's trolley wires.
Bay Area Rapid Transit B-Car #1834	Display	Acquired 2024. 1,676 mm (5 ft 6 in) broad gauge, and runs on Third rail with 1 kV DC.
Bay Area Rapid Transit C-Car #329	Display	Acquired 2024. 1,676 mm (5 ft 6 in) broad gauge, and runs on Third rail with 1 kV DC, which is incompatible with the museum's trolley wires.
Cedar Rapids & Iowa City #111	Operational	
Central California Traction Co. #010	Awaiting restoration	Body only
Key System #182	operational	Recently repaired.
Key System #186	Stored	
Key System #187	Operational	
Oakland, Antioch & Eastern #1020	operational	Former SN motor #1020 restored as trailer
Oregon Electric #1001 Champoeg	Cosmetically restored	Restored as trailer usable in train
Pacific Electric #457	Awaiting restoration	Body and trucks only
Peninsular Railway #52	Under Restoration	Currently being repainted and replacement of worn out materials
Peninsular Railway #61	Awaiting restoration	
Petaluma & Santa Rosa #63	Operational	
Portland Traction Co. #4001	Operational	Restored in 2015
Richmond Shipyard Railway #561	Operational	
Richmond Shipyard Railway #563	Cosmetically restored	
Sacramento Northern "Bidwell"	Awaiting restoration	body only
Sacramento Northern #1005	Operational	Recently restored
Salt Lake & Utah #751	Operational	
Salt Lake, Garfield & Western #306	Incomplete restoration	
San Francisco & Napa Valley #63	Awaiting restoration	
San Francisco-Sacramento #1019	Awaiting restoration	Former SN motor #1019
Interurban Electric Railway #358	Awaiting restoration	Body only
Interurban Electric Railway #600	Awaiting restoration	Body only
Interurban Electric Railway #602	Awaiting restoration	Body only
Interurban Electric Railway #603	Awaiting restoration	Body only
Tidewater Southern #200	Awaiting restoration	
San Diego Trolley Siemens–Duewag U2 #1017	Operational	
San Diego Trolley Siemens–Duewag U2 #1018	Operational	
Los Angeles Metro Rail Nippon Sharyo P2020 #164	operational	Acquired April 2023. Second non-Boeing and/or non-Siemens light rail vehicle to be preserved in a museum in the United States, after P865 144 at the Southern California Railway Museum in Perris, California.

=== Streetcars/Light rail trams ===
Streetcar	Condition	Notes	Image
East Bay Street Railways #352	Operational	Safety car streetcar built by the St. Louis Car Company. After retirement from active service, was used as a storage shed in the Berkeley Hills before being acquired by the museum. Restored to its current condition in 1985 to appear as it did in 1931.	
Key System #271	Under restoration	Suburban streetcar originally built by the St. Louis Car Company for the Lehigh Valley Transit Company. Purchased by the Bay Area Electric Railroad Association from the Key System in 1946. First car acquired by the Association. Needs electric and brake work, being painted.	
Key System #987	Out of service	Streetcar built by the Key System Emeryville shops, a copy of other streetcars built by the American Car Company. Bad traction motor.	
Market Street Railway "San Francisco"	Awaiting restoration	body only	
Melbourne & Metropolitan Tramways Board #648	Operational	An Australian W2 Class Tram formerly operated in Melbourne. Operated in San Francisco's History Trolley Festivals before being purchased by the museum in the 1980s.	
Pacific Gas & Electric Co #46	Awaiting restoration		
Pacific Gas & Electric Co #63	Awaiting restoration		
Presidio & Ferries #28	Awaiting restoration	body only	
Sacramento Electric Gas & Railway #14	Awaiting restoration		
San Francisco Municipal Railway #1003	Operational	"Magic Carpet" type streetcar built by the St. Louis Car Company. Similar to double-ended PCC streetcars except with hand controllers instead of foot pedals. Only survivor of five built. Purchased by the museum in 1959.	
San Francisco Municipal Railway #1016	Operational	PCC Streetcar built by the St. Louis Car Company. First of the last order of new PCCs built in the US. Purchased by the museum in 1982.	
San Francisco Municipal Railway #1153	Awaiting restoration	PCC Streetcar built by the St. Louis Car Company originally for the St. Louis Public Service Company. Acquired by Muni in the 1950s before being purchased by the museum in 1982.	
San Francisco Municipal Railway #1258	Operational	US Standard Light Rail Vehicle manufactured by Boeing Vertol. Acquired by the museum in 2002.	
San Francisco Municipal Railway #178	Operational	"Iron Monster" type streetcar built by the Bethlehem Shipbuilding Corporation in San Francisco. Purchased by the museum in 1959. Loaned back to Muni in the 1980s for the Historic Trolley Festivals.	
Stockton Electric #52	Awaiting restoration		
Sacramento Northern #62	Out of service	A single truck, double-end, archroof Birney Safety Car, arranged for one-man operation	
San Francisco Municipal Railway #1534	Newly delivered	An articulated light-rail vehicle manufactured by Breda. Retired from service in 2025, arrived at the museum in September 2026.	

=== Locomotives ===
Locomotive	Type	Condition	Notes
Central California Traction Co. #7	Electric box motor	Operational	
Central California Traction Co. #30	70-ton switcher	Display	
Kennecott Copper Corporation #407	Electric steeple-cab	Display	
Kenecott Copper Corporation #700	Electric steeple-cab	Under restoration	
Kenecott Copper Corporation #771	Battery operated steeple-cab	stored	
Key System #1001	Electric steeple-cab	Out of service	Pantograph under restoration
Sacramento Northern #146	44-ton switcher	Under restoration	
Sacramento Northern #602	Electric box motor	Awaiting restoration	
Sacramento Northern #652	Electric steeple-cab	Cosmetically restored	
Sacramento Northern #654	Electric steeple-cab	Operational	
Salt Lake Garfield & Western DS2	44-ton switcher	Awaiting restoration	
San Francisco & Napa Valley #100	Electric box motor	Awaiting restoration	Body and trucks only
Visalia Electric #502	44-ton switcher	Operational	
Western Pacific #94	4-6-0	Display	
Western Pacific #334	2-8-2	Stored	

=== Maintenance of Way equipment ===
Car	Car Type	Condition	Notes
East Bay Transit Co. #1011	Wrecker	Operational	Display
Key System #1014	Wrecker	Awaiting restoration	Body only
Key System #1201	Line car	Operational	
Key System #1215	Shop switcher	Operational	
Key System #1218	Line car	Awaiting restoration	
Sacramento Northern #1	Portable substation	Operational	Used on first Saturday of the month to power the railroad
San Francisco Municipal Railway #0109	Rail grinder	Operational	Stored

=== Freight cars ===
Car	Car Type	Condition
Oakland Antioch & Eastern #2002	Flatcar	Restored
Central California Traction #1017	Flatcar	Incomplete restoration
Central California Traction Co #2001	Box car	Restored
Central California Traction Co. #3001	Box car	Restored
Denver & Rio Grande Western #63383	Box car	Restored
Great Northern #X 344	Caboose	Incomplete restoration
Pacific Fruit Express #20420	Refrigerator car	Awaiting restoration
Richmond Fredericksburg & Potomac #2289	Box car	Restored
Sacramento Northern Railway #1632	Caboose	Restored
Sacramento Northern Railway #2314	Box car	Awaiting restoration
Sacramento Northern Railroad #2136	Box car	Awaiting restoration
Shell #SCCX 662	Tank car	Restored
Southern Pacific #150340	Gondola car	Awaiting restoration
Western Pacific #10429	Hopper car	Restored
Western Pacific #1025	Tank car	Awaiting restoration
Western Pacific #741	Caboose	Awaiting restoration

== The museum today ==
Visitors can take a 1.5 mi (2.4 km) streetcar ride and/or a 10 mi (16 km) Interurban ride, picnic at the shaded grounds, browse in the bookstore and view small exhibits in the visitor center. Also in the visitor center is the depot cafe and F. M. Smith Library and Archives, which are open two days a month for research and browsing. Also available are self-guided car house tours and guided car house tours.

The museum is open on weekends throughout the year and for extended hours during the summer. On some October weekends, it operates trains (usually Key System Bridge Units 182 and 187) to the Pumpkin Patch Festival at the Gum Grove Station.

== Route map ==
The collection also includes a railroad line. This is a section of the original Sacramento Northern Railway from Montezuma (near Collinsville) north to Dozier, also a newer rail line west from Dozier to Cannon (near Vacaville). The railroad was acquired with rails and ties intact, however the electrification had been removed in 1953. The Association is reinstalling the electrification from Rio Vista Junction southward, currently reaching Bird's Landing Road, about six miles. The line to Molena is currently being restored, including changing of ties, and re-electrification of the line.

== See also ==
- Hall-Scott
- List of heritage railroads in California
- List of museums in California
- W. L. Holman Car Company
