= Granville P. Swift =

California pioneer (1821–1875)

Granville Perry Swift

Granville Perry Swift (May 1, 1821 in Lexington, Kentucky – April 21, 1875) was a California pioneer who participated in the Bear Flag Revolt in 1846 and who was highly successful at gold mining. His great-uncle was Daniel Boone.

He came to California at the age of 19 in 1840. Records indicate he was active in the Sacramento Valley, hunting and trading rawhide and furs. During the rebellion of the Californios in 1844–45, Governor Manuel Micheltorena asked John Sutter to form a troop of riflemen, of which Swift was one.

By 1846, however, Swift would later favor independence from Mexico. He was one of thirty-three Americans who captured the town of Sonoma. He was elected sergeant of the party and even helped design the Bear Flag.

He served until the spring of 1847, after which time he settled in Colusi County, where he ran an extensive cattle operation. It was during this time that he constructed a corral made of flat stones, as there was no timber in the surrounding country. This corral, still standing, became known as Swift's Stone Corral and is now registered as California Historical Landmark #238. In addition, his adobe from the ranch is registered as CHL #345 (the two are listed in different counties because Colusi County was later split into Colusa, Glenn, and Tehama counties).

After the discovery of gold at Sutter's Fort, Swift took a party to Bidwell's Bar in 1848 and struck it rich. A fellow miner recalls, "Swift was one of the best miners I ever knew. It seems as if he could almost smell the gold. He made an immense amount of gold." With his newfound wealth, Swift, his brother William, and his cousin Frank Sears first purchased the ranch they had been working, and later purchased 15,000 acres (61 km^{2}) of Mariano Guadalupe Vallejo's Rancho Petaluma, located near Sears Point.

In 1858 he constructed his three-story Southern antebellum-style mansion, called Temelec, on the rancho. The first two floors had 14 rooms, while the dining room could seat as many as 50 guests and featured a fireplace of imported Italian marble. It also had an encircling balcony supported by great stone columns. Swift also buried an estimated $100,000 in gold. The list of his burial locations (in his handwriting) still survives, with notations like "1 tin box & 1 Little Bottle Boath in the saim hoal." He was later unable to identify many of the hiding places; gold believed to have been Swift's has been found several times, including in 1914 by A.W. Lehrke, who dug under his ranch house after a dream.

Rich and famous, he married 16-year-old Eliza Jane Tate of Sonoma. Together they had three sons before their divorce in 1869.

However, his fortunes would soon take a turn for the worse. He suffered serious financial losses in the so-called Comstock Swindle, forcing him to sell off his ranch and Temelec to pay his debts. In 1850, $80,000 in gold that his sister had panned was washed away by the creek near which Swift had buried it. The family then moved to Solano County in 1864, settling in Green Valley. The stone mansion they purchased today houses the Green Valley Country Club.

Swift returned to prospecting, this time for quicksilver in the mountains between Berryessa Valley and Knoxville, but on April 21, 1875, at the age of 54, he was riding on a mule and suffered a fatal fall on a steep mountain path. He is buried at Rockville Cemetery in Suisun.

== See also ==
- California Historical Landmarks in Sonoma County
- National Register of Historic Places listings in Sonoma County, California
- Temelec Hall built by Swift
