= National Register of Historic Places listings in Sonoma County, California =

Location of Sonoma County in California

This is a list of the National Register of Historic Places listings in Sonoma County, California.

This is intended to be a complete list of the properties and districts on the National Register of Historic Places in Sonoma County, California, United States. Latitude and longitude coordinates are provided for many National Register properties and districts; these locations may be seen together in an online map.

There are 79 properties and districts listed on the National Register in the county, including 6 National Historic Landmarks.

This National Park Service list is complete through NPS recent listings posted November 13, 2026.

== Current listings ==
	Name on the Register	Image	Date listed	Location	City or town	Description
1	Baker House	Baker House	December 12, 2018 (#100003234)	35292 Timber Ridge Rd. 38°41′30″N 123°25′13″W	Sea Ranch	
2	Belden-Birkhofer House	Belden-Birkhofer House	January 22, 2024 (#100009749)	13555 Highway 116; 38°29′57″N 122°59′21″W	Guerneville	
3	Bodega Bay	Bodega Bay	December 18, 1973 (#73000461)	Address Restricted	Bodega Bay	
4	Buena Vista Winery	Buena Vista Winery	July 24, 1986 (#86001902)	18000 Old Winery Rd. 38°17′58″N 122°25′23″W	Sonoma	Also known as Buena Vista Vineyards-Buena Vista Vinicultural Society
5	Luther Burbank House and Garden	Luther Burbank House and Garden	October 15, 1966 (#66000241)	200 Santa Rosa Ave. 38°26′10″N 122°42′42″W	Santa Rosa	
6	Nicholas Carriger Estate	Nicholas Carriger Estate	November 16, 2001 (#01001234)	18880 Carriger Rd. 38°17′48″N 122°30′43″W	Sonoma	1850 home of early American settler, farmer and gold-mining magnate Nicholas Carriger
7	Cloverdale Railroad Station		December 12, 1976 (#76000536)	Railroad Ave. 38°48′14″N 123°00′41″W	Cloverdale	Destroyed by fire September 21, 1991
8	Cnopius House	Cnopius House	April 12, 1982 (#82002277)	726 College Ave. 38°26′44″N 122°42′45″W	Santa Rosa	
9	Comstock House	Comstock House	January 27, 2012 (#11001053)	767 Mendocino Ave. 38°26′52″N 122°43′05″W	Santa Rosa	
10	Condominium 1	Condominium 1	July 29, 2005 (#05000731)	110–128 Sea Walk Dr. 38°40′45″N 123°25′40″W	Sea Ranch	
11	Cunningham-Hembree Estate	Cunningham-Hembree Estate	July 9, 2018 (#100002638)	9225 Foxwood Dr. 38°33′08″N 122°48′40″W	Windsor	
12	De Turk Round Barn	De Turk Round Barn	April 21, 2004 (#04000334)	819 Donahue St. 38°26′27″N 122°43′31″W	Santa Rosa	
13	Dry Creek-Warm Springs Valleys Archeological District		December 9, 1977 (#77000350)	Address Restricted	Healdsburg vicinity	
14	Duncan's Landing Site	Duncan's Landing Site	November 12, 1971 (#71000206)	Address Restricted	Jenner	
15	Ellis-Martin House	Ellis-Martin House	October 4, 2006 (#06000915)	1197 E. Washington St. 38°14′43″N 122°37′48″W	Petaluma	
16	Fisk's Mill Landing Historical and Archaeological District		April 10, 2025 (#100011620)	Address Restricted	Jenner vicinity	
17	Flamingo Hotel		September 20, 2021 (#100006937)	2777 4th St. 38°27′04″N 122°41′18″W	Santa Rosa	
18	Fort Ross	Fort Ross	October 15, 1966 (#66000239)	Fort Ross State Historic Park; 38°30′51″N 123°14′34″W	Fort Ross	
19	Fort Ross Commander's House	Fort Ross Commander's House	April 15, 1970 (#70000150)	Fort Ross State Historic Park; 38°30′45″N 123°14′34″W	Fort Ross	Also known as Rotchev House
20	Fort Ross Landing Historical and Archaeological District		April 7, 2023 (#100008442)	Fort Ross State Historic Park; 38°30′43″N 123°14′42″W	Jenner vicinity	830 acres (340 ha) of land and water at Fort Ross, including Rotchev House and wreck of SS Pomona.
21	Free Public Library of Petaluma	Free Public Library of Petaluma	June 23, 1988 (#88000925)	20 Fourth St. 38°13′57″N 122°38′24″W	Petaluma	
22	Freestone Store	Freestone Store	February 28, 2022 (#100007484)	500 Bohemian Hwy. 38°22′24″N 122°55′06″W	Freestone	
23	The Gables	The Gables	September 20, 1984 (#84001206)	4257 Petaluma Hill Rd. 38°23′37″N 122°41′35″W	Santa Rosa	
24	Geyserville Union School		October 24, 1979 (#79000558)	Main St. 38°42′28″N 122°54′23″W	Geyserville	Demolished in 1994
25	Glen Oaks Ranch	Glen Oaks Ranch	October 21, 1994 (#94001223)	13255 Sonoma Hwy. 38°22′14″N 122°30′47″W	Glen Ellen	
26	Luther Burbank's Experimental Farm & Cottage (Gold Ridge Farm)	Luther Burbank's Experimental Farm & Cottage (Gold Ridge Farm)	December 14, 1978 (#78000803)	W of Sebastopol; 38°23′51″N 122°50′01″W	Sebastopol	
27	Gould-Shaw House	Gould-Shaw House	September 10, 1992 (#92001244)	215 N. Cloverdale Blvd. 38°48′25″N 123°01′03″W	Cloverdale	
28	Guerneville Bridge	Guerneville Bridge	August 4, 1989 (#89000945)	Rt. 116 over Russian River; 38°30′04″N 122°59′40″W	Guerneville	
29	Healdsburg Carnegie Library	Healdsburg Carnegie Library	July 6, 1988 (#88000924)	221 Matheson St. 38°37′13″N 122°51′58″W	Healdsburg	Carnegie library built in 1911, now the Healdsburg Museum
30	Healdsburg Memorial Bridge	Healdsburg Memorial Bridge	April 14, 2011 (#11000214)	Healdsburg Ave., junction of Front St. 38°36′14″N 122°51′36″W	Healdsburg	Highway Bridges of California MPS
31	Hicks House	Hicks House	July 21, 1987 (#87001157)	3160 Hicks Rd. 38°26′14″N 122°51′54″W	Graton	
32	Hinds Hotel	Hinds Hotel	January 31, 1979 (#79000557)	306 Bohemian Hwy. 38°22′20″N 122°54′53″W	Freestone	
33	Hines House	Hines House	June 23, 2021 (#100006689)	301 Chinquapin Ln. 38°41′31″N 123°25′30″W	Sea Ranch	
34	William Hood House	William Hood House	February 6, 1998 (#97001658)	7501 Sonoma Hwy; 38°26′33″N 122°34′41″W	Santa Rosa	
35	Hotel Chauvet	Hotel Chauvet	February 15, 1990 (#90000117)	13756 Arnold Dr. 38°21′44″N 122°31′34″W	Glen Ellen	
36	Hotel La Rose	Hotel La Rose	August 3, 1978 (#78000802)	5th and Wilson Sts. 38°26′17″N 122°43′15″W	Santa Rosa	Sturdy hotel built by four Italian stonemasons after 1906 San Francisco earthquake destroyed predecessor.
37	Ives Dental Office		May 18, 2026 (#100012885)	114 North Main Street; 38°48′22″N 123°00′58″W	Cloverdale	
38	Knipp and Stengel Ranch Barn	Knipp and Stengel Ranch Barn	January 29, 1987 (#87000005)	CA 1; 38°42′57″N 123°27′17″W	Sea Ranch	
39	James H. and Frances E. Laughlin House	James H. and Frances E. Laughlin House	April 26, 1979 (#79000563)	SE of Windsor on Lone Redwood Rd. 38°30′46″N 122°47′02″W	Windsor	
40	Llano Road Roadhouse	Llano Road Roadhouse	May 22, 1978 (#78000804)	4353 Gravenstein Hwy., S 38°21′29″N 122°46′04″W	Sebastopol	
41	Jack London Ranch	Jack London Ranch	October 15, 1966 (#66000240)	0.4 mi. W of Glen Ellen in Jack London Historical State Park; 38°21′02″N 122°32′35″W	Glen Ellen	
42	W. H. Lumsden House	W. H. Lumsden House	August 11, 1983 (#83001245)	727 Mendocino Ave. 38°26′47″N 122°43′01″W	Santa Rosa	
43	Madrona Manor	Madrona Manor	April 2, 1987 (#87000573)	1001 Westside Rd. 38°36′17″N 122°53′07″W	Healdsburg vicinity	Also known as Madrona Knoll Rancho District
44	McDonald Mansion	McDonald Mansion	March 1, 1974 (#74000560)	1015 McDonald Ave. 38°27′01″N 122°42′15″W	Santa Rosa	
45	Mini-Mod #3		January 12, 2026 (#100012540)	35255 Timber Ridge Road; 38°41′24″N 123°25′09″W	Sea Ranch	
46	Norlina (shipwreck and remains)		September 30, 2022 (#100008248)	Address Restricted	Jenner vicinity	
47	Old Petaluma Opera House	Old Petaluma Opera House	December 22, 1978 (#78000801)	147–149 Kentucky St. 38°14′06″N 122°38′31″W	Petaluma	
48	Old Post Office	Old Post Office	November 16, 1979 (#79000559)	425 7th St. 38°26′31″N 122°43′01″W	Santa Rosa	Now home of the Sonoma County Museum
49	Orange Lawn	Orange Lawn	June 9, 2008 (#08000529)	645 Charles Van Damme Way; 38°17′22″N 122°26′46″W	Sonoma	
50	Park Apartments	Park Apartments	April 26, 1979 (#79000560)	300 Santa Rosa Ave. 38°26′07″N 122°42′41″W	Santa Rosa	
51	Petaluma Adobe	Petaluma Adobe	April 15, 1970 (#70000151)	4 mi. E of Petaluma on Casa Grande Rd. 38°15′20″N 122°35′03″W	Petaluma	
52	Petaluma and Santa Rosa Railway Powerhouse	Petaluma and Santa Rosa Railway Powerhouse	July 23, 1991 (#91000918)	238–258 Petaluma Ave. 38°24′05″N 122°49′19″W	Sebastopol	
53	Petaluma Historic Commercial District	Petaluma Historic Commercial District	March 31, 1995 (#95000354)	Along Petaluma Blvd., between B and Prospect Sts. 38°14′03″N 122°38′25″W	Petaluma	
54	Petaluma Silk Mill	Petaluma Silk Mill	March 6, 1986 (#86000386)	420 Jefferson St. 38°14′10″N 122°37′51″W	Petaluma	
55	Petaluma Woman's Club		June 11, 2024 (#100010437)	518 B Street; 38°13′53″N 122°38′26″W	Petaluma	
56	Simon Pinschower House	Simon Pinschower House	February 25, 1982 (#82002276)	302 N. Main St. 38°48′31″N 123°00′59″W	Cloverdale	
57	Pond Farm Pottery Historic District	Pond Farm Pottery Historic District	June 17, 2014 (#14000307)	17000 Armstrong Woods Road; 38°33′08″N 123°00′00″W	Guerneville	Designated a National Historic Landmark in 2023.
58	Railroad Square District	Railroad Square District	April 20, 1979 (#79000561)	Roughly bounded by 3rd, Davis, Wilson, and 6th Sts. and Santa Rosa Creek; 38°26′14″N 122°43′13″W	Santa Rosa	A boundary decrease was approved September 30, 2025.
59	The Ranch Site		July 14, 1971 (#71000205)	Address Restricted	Bodega Bay	
60	Rosenberg's Department Store	Rosenberg's Department Store	December 29, 1994 (#94001497)	700 Fourth St. 38°26′28″N 122°42′40″W	Santa Rosa	
61	Salt Point Landing Historical and Archaeological District		April 11, 2022 (#100007268)	Address Restricted	Jenner vicinity	
62	Salt Point State Park Archeological District		March 24, 1971 (#71000207)	Address Restricted	Salt Point State Park	
63	Sebastopol Depot of the Petaluma and Santa Rosa Railway	Sebastopol Depot of the Petaluma and Santa Rosa Railway	February 16, 1996 (#96000109)	261 S. Main St. 38°24′03″N 122°49′19″W	Sebastopol	
64	Isaac E. Shaw Building	Isaac E. Shaw Building	January 25, 1991 (#90002155)	219 N. Cloverdale Blvd. 38°48′24″N 123°01′06″W	Cloverdale	
65	Sonoma Depot	Sonoma Depot	April 3, 1975 (#75000488)	284 1st St., W 38°17′46″N 122°27′27″W	Sonoma	
66	Sonoma Grammar School	Sonoma Grammar School	November 28, 1980 (#80000871)	276 E. Napa St. 38°17′30″N 122°27′10″W	Sonoma	
67	Sonoma Plaza	Sonoma Plaza	April 3, 1975 (#75000489)	Center of Sonoma; also the area south and east of the town plaza, along Broadway and the northern side of E. Napa St. 38°17′37″N 122°27′12″W	Sonoma	Second set of boundaries represents a boundary increase of May 6, 1992
68	Sonoma State Home-Main Building	Sonoma State Home-Main Building	October 6, 2000 (#00001180)	15000 Arnold Dr. 38°20′51″N 122°31′06″W	Eldridge	Also known as Sonoma Developmental Center
69	Sonoma Valley Woman's Club	Sonoma Valley Woman's Club	January 7, 2015 (#14001115)	574 1st St., E. 38°17′26″N 122°27′25″W	Sonoma	
70	SS POMONA (Shipwreck)	SS POMONA (Shipwreck)	January 31, 2008 (#07000306)	Fort Ross Cove, off Fort Ross Historic State Park; 38°30′37″N 123°14′44″W	Jenner	
71	George A. Strout House	George A. Strout House	June 17, 1980 (#80000870)	253 Florence Ave. 38°24′11″N 122°49′40″W	Sebastopol	
72	Philip Sweed House	Philip Sweed House	June 18, 1992 (#92000787)	301 Keokuk St. 38°14′11″N 122°38′47″W	Petaluma	
73	Sweet House	Sweet House	January 14, 1988 (#87002415)	607 Cherry St. 38°26′42″N 122°42′56″W	Santa Rosa	
74	Temelec	Temelec	April 19, 2006 (#06000312)	220 and 221 Temelec Circle; 38°15′57″N 122°29′59″W	Temelec	
75	US Post Office-Petaluma	US Post Office-Petaluma	January 11, 1985 (#85000140)	120 4th St. 38°13′55″N 122°38′16″W	Petaluma	
76	Vallejo Estate	Vallejo Estate	June 29, 1972 (#72000262)	Corner of Spain and W. 3rd Sts. 38°17′56″N 122°27′46″W	Sonoma	
77	Walters Ranch	Walters Ranch	October 7, 1977 (#77000351)	6 mi. S of Healdsburg at 6050 Westside Rd. 38°32′16″N 122°52′05″W	Healdsburg vicinity	
78	Wasserman House	Wasserman House	January 31, 1979 (#79000562)	930 Mendocino Ave. 38°27′02″N 122°42′59″W	Santa Rosa	
79	Watson School	Watson School	August 18, 1978 (#78000800)	15000 Bodega Hwy. 38°21′21″N 122°56′16″W	Bodega	

== See also ==
- List of National Historic Landmarks in California
- National Register of Historic Places listings in California
- California Historical Landmarks in Sonoma County, California
