= Rotchev House =

Historic house in California, United States

- Fort Ross Commander's House
- U.S. National Register of Historic Places
- U.S. National Historic Landmark
- U.S. National Historic Landmark District – Contributing property
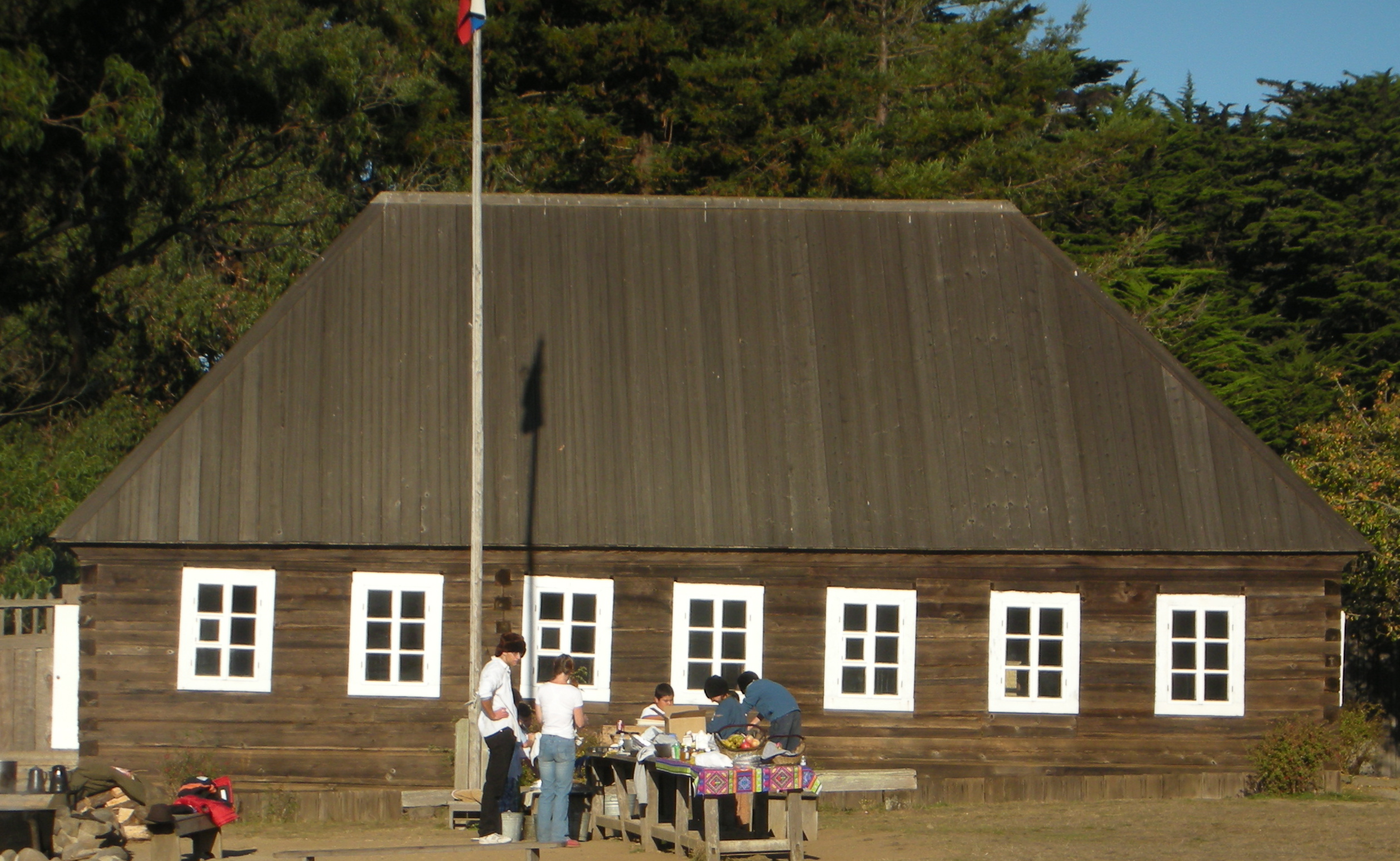

- Location within California Location within the United States
- Location: Fort Ross State Historic Park
- Nearest city: Fort Ross, California
- Coordinates: 38°50′52″N 123°14′37″W
- Area: 4 acres (1.6 ha)
- Built: 1812
- Architectural style: Log building
- Part of: Fort Ross (ID66000239)
- NRHP reference No.: 70000150

Significant dates
- Added to NRHP: April 15, 1970
- Designated NHL: May 15, 1970
- Designated NHLDCP: November 5, 1961

The Rotchev House is a historic house at Fort Ross State Historic Park in the U.S. state of California. Built in 1812, it is the fort's only building to survive from the period of the Russian-American Company's California settlement. It is one of a very small number of Russian-built structures in the United States, and was designated a National Historic Landmark in 1970 as the Commander's House, Fort Ross. (Fort Ross as a whole is also a National Historic Landmark.)

== Description and history ==
The Rotchev House is located in Fort Ross State Historic Park, located on the Northern California coastline of Sonoma County. It is a single-story structure measuring about 36 by 48 feet (11 m × 15 m), built out of hand-squared redwood timbers joined by notches at the corners. It is covered by a steeply pitched hip roof fashioned out of split and hewn redwood, laid in planks as long as 23 feet (7.0 m) and as much as 1 inch (2.5 cm) thick. The planking is chiseled in place to help channel water away from the gaps between planks further down the roof. The interior is divided into seven chambers and a larger hall.

Fort Ross was founded in 1812 by a team from the Russian-American Company under the leadership of Ivan Kuskov. The Rotchev House is one of the buildings constructed during the first year; other buildings included barracks, a chapel, and storehouses. The fort was sold in 1841 to John Sutter and was vacated by the Russian company in 1842. The house is named for the last Russian commander, Alexander Rotchev.

== See also ==
- List of National Historic Landmarks in California
- National Register of Historic Places listings in Sonoma County, California
