= Sonoma Valley Woman's Club =

Woman's club in California

- U.S. National Register of Historic Places
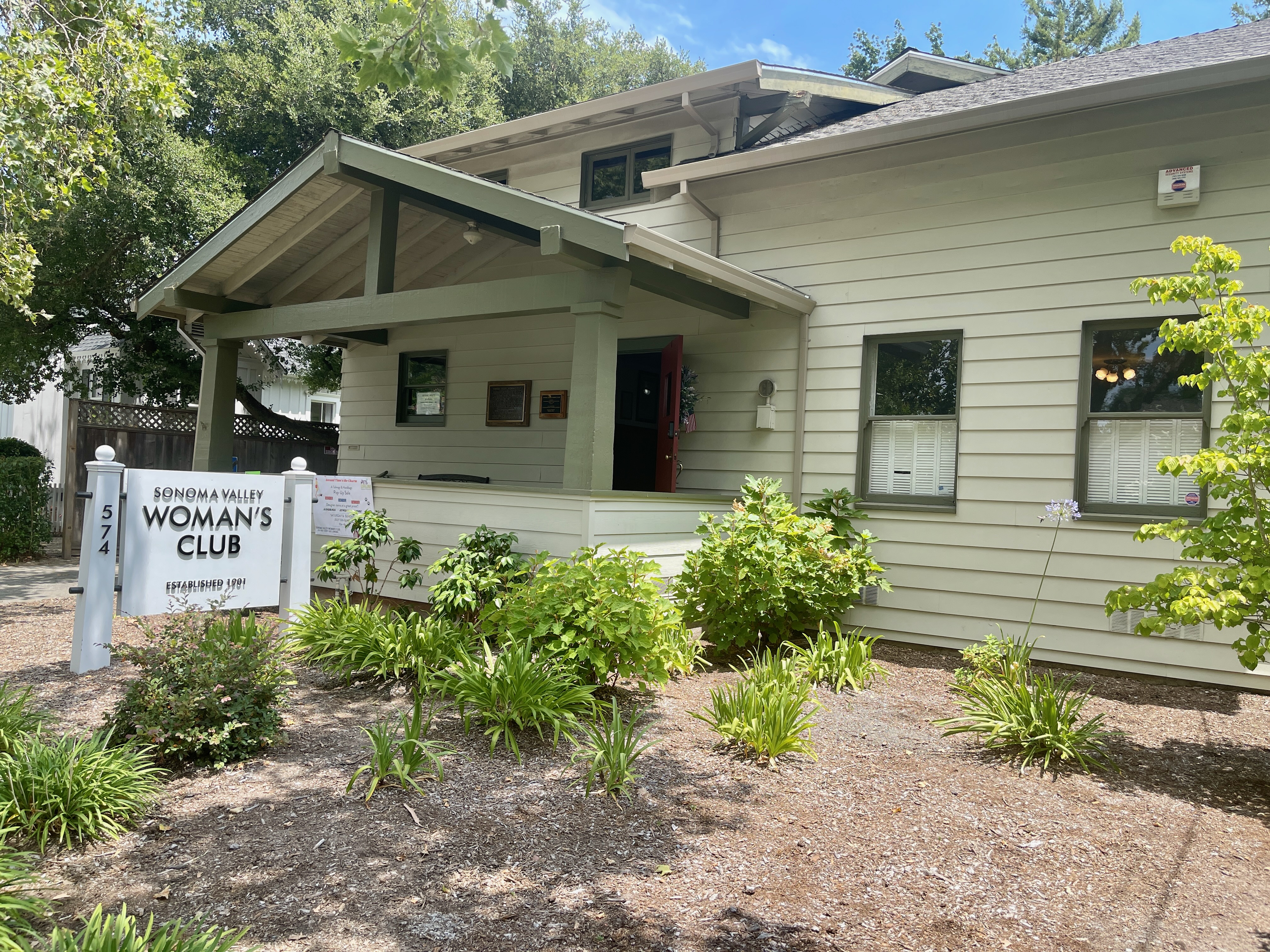
- Clubhouse in 2024

- Location within California
- Location: 574 1st Street, E., Sonoma, California, U.S.
- Coordinates: 38°17′26″N 122°27′25″W
- Area: 4,689 square feet (435.6 m^{2})
- Built: 1916; 110 years ago
- Built by: W. E. Warriner
- Architect: Brainerd Jones
- Architectural style: American Craftsman
- Website: www.sonomavalleywomansclub.org
- NRHP reference No.: 14001115
- Added to NRHP: January 7, 2015

Sonoma Valley Woman's Club is a historic woman's clubhouse located in Sonoma, California. It was founded in 1901 by eleven local women led by Martha Stearns. Built in 1916, the club was designed by architect Brainerd Jones from Petaluma and plays a role in the civic development of Sonoma. The Woman's Club was listed on the National Register of Historic Places on January 7, 2015.

== Clubhouse history ==
The Sonoma Valley Woman's Club (SVWC) was founded on September 21, 1901, by eleven local women led by Martha Stearns. This coincided with the year when the General Federation of Women's Clubs was granted a charter by Congress. By October 26 of that same year, the club had 40 charter members. The club played a role in the preservation of Sonoma's historic buildings and the improvement of the Sonoma Plaza, developing the Sonoma Carnegie Library at 453 1st Street East, and restoring the Sonoma Mission.

Shortly after its formation, the Woman's Club initiated the Plaza Fund to finance improvements to the Sonoma Plaza. They planted trees and paths and installed three benches in 1903. On March 25, 1904, the Santa Rosa Republican published an article about the project, stating that beautifying the Plaza would significantly enhance Sonoma's attractiveness and help the Women's Club achieve its goals. In 1905, the club president Mrs. Robert P. Hill, sent out postcards featuring the stone foundation the club placed in the Plaza. In 1908, they erected a monument commemorating the Bear Flag Revolt. A larger Bear Flag Monument was installed by the Native Sons of the Golden West (NSGW) in 1914.

In 1903, SVWC took the initial steps to establish a free library for Sonoma. They raised funds to buy books and furnishings for the new building. By August 7, 1909, the Library was handed over to the city council for governance when it became the Sonoma Carnegie Library.

In 1903, the SVWC raised $184 (equivalent to $6,593 in 2025) to help preserve the Sonoma Mission as a city landmark. In 1910, Club members got a lease on the property and raised $800 (equivalent to $27,643 in 2025) for repairs. They were assisted by the Native Sons and Daughters of Sonoma. In 1911, club members petitioned the State Legislature, resulting in a appropriation of $5,000 (equivalent to $172,768 in 2025) to restore the Mission.

By 1914, fundraising efforts began to raise money for building a clubhouse. The chosen site was situated on a residential block at 574 1st Street East, Sonoma, California, within a block south of the Sonoma Plaza. In 1916, the Native Sons provided a loan for $2,500 equivalent to $73,968 in 2025). Contractor W. E. Warriner was selected to build the clubhouse. The first meeting in the new clubhouse took place on September 15, 1916.

== Design ==
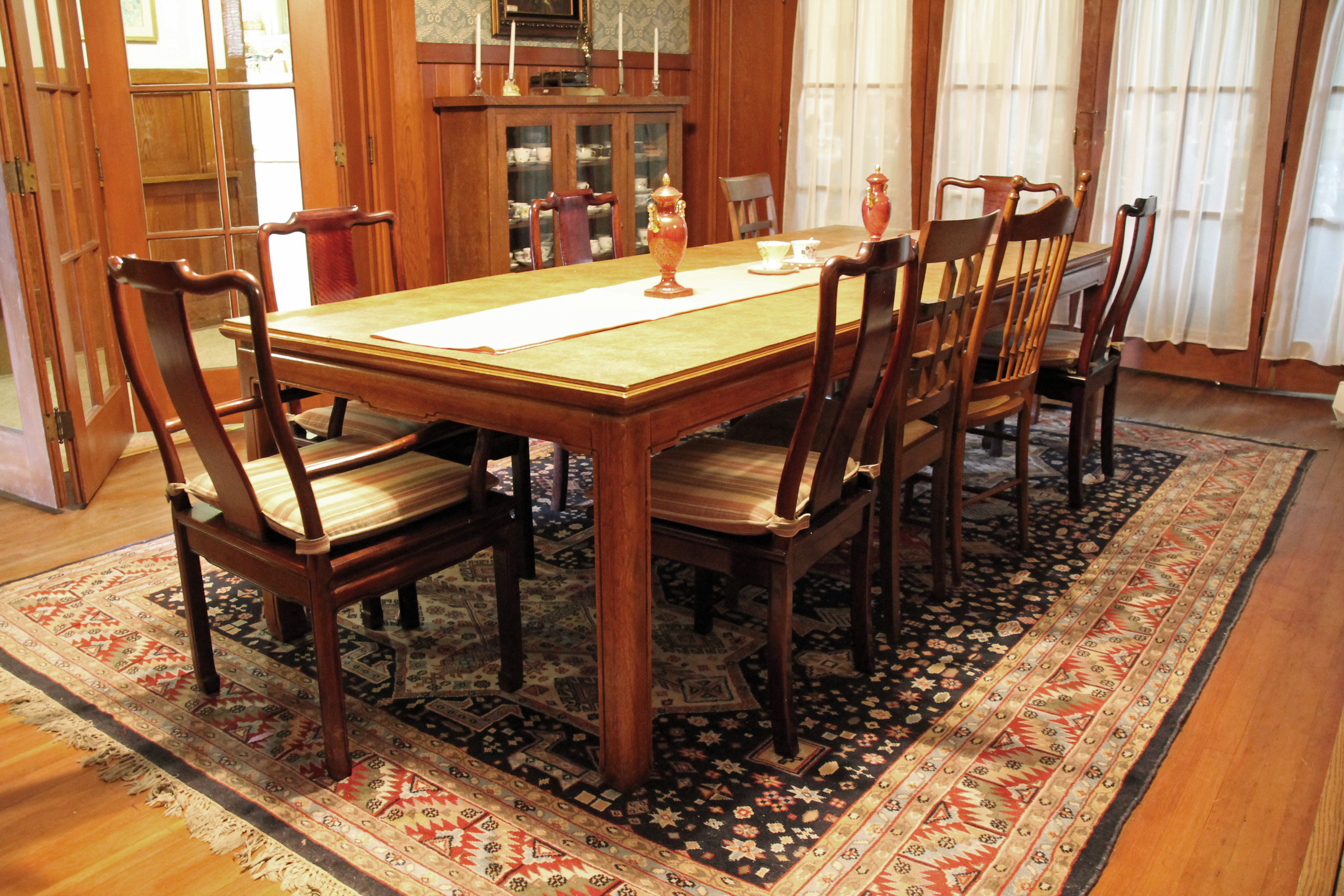
Sonoma Valley Woman's Club dining room

The SVWC is a 2 1/2-and-one-half story wooden building with a cross-gabled roof. The building was designed in the American Craftsman-style by architect Brainerd Jones (1869-1945) of Petaluma in 1916. The building is on a 7,800 square feet (720 m^{2}) lot. It includes a front porch supported by three concrete steps, topped by a gable roof with an exposed timber truss. Towards the front, there's a gable roof to the right and a shallow-pitched shed dormer above the porch roof on the left side.

Inside, the foyer opens with the parlor to the right, the Women's Lounge and stairs to the second level to the left with kitchen, and directly ahead is the entrance to a large auditorium and stage. All finishes are redwood wainscoting with vertical redwood boards and plaster walls and ceiling. The parlor contains a fireplace and wood mantel that can be used as a dining room. The Women's Lounge is 11.9 ft (3.6 m) by 10.3 ft (3.1 m) with a bathroom. The second story leads to a landing, office, bathroom, and an attic.

== Historical significance ==
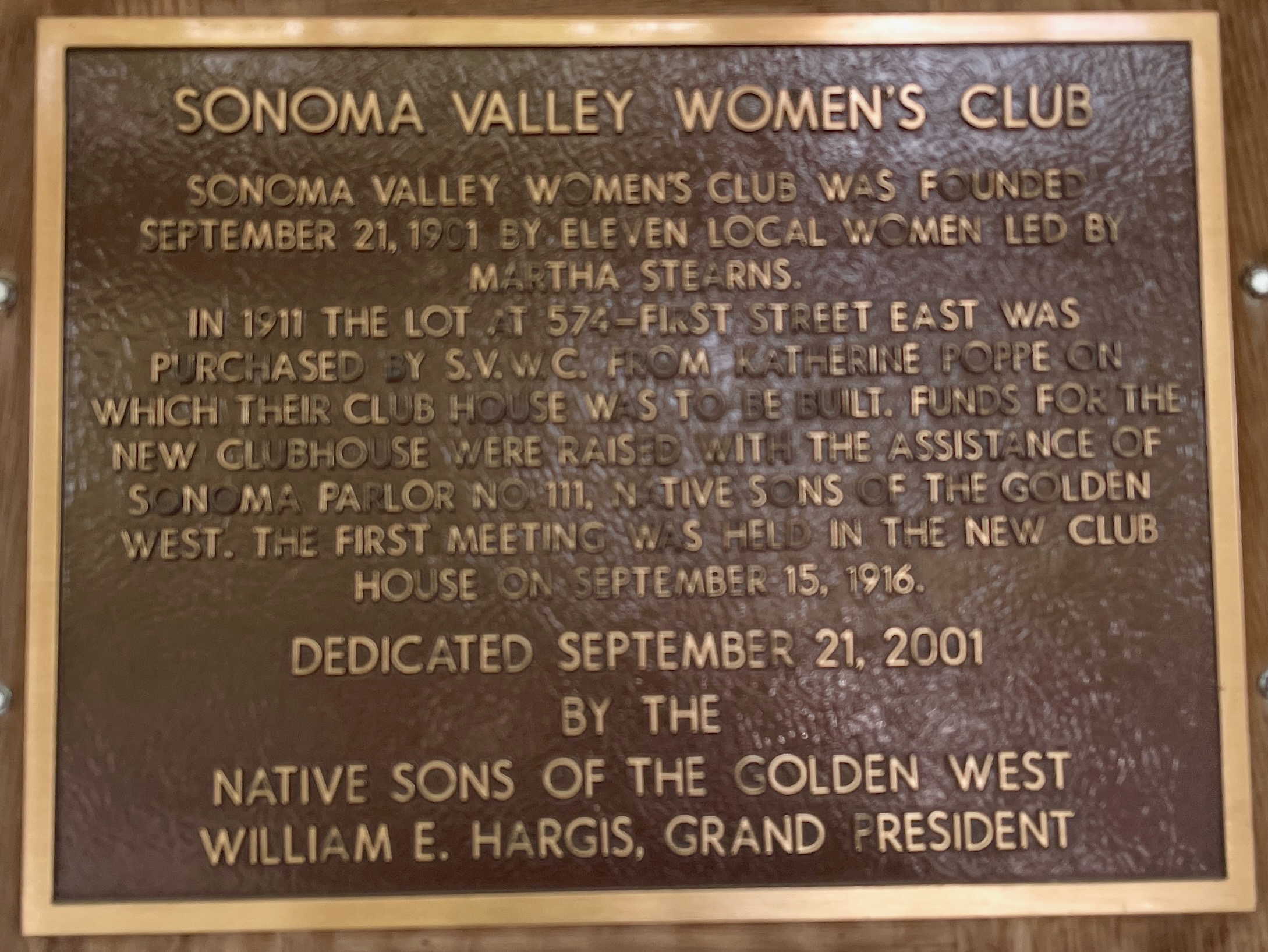
Sonoma Valley Woman's Club Plaque

The SVWC is historically significant in social history, women's history, and architectural heritage. The 1916 American Craftsman-style building, created by architect Brainerd Jones of Petaluma, has been associated with the Club since its inception. The club has been integral to the urban development of Sonoma.

Adjacent to the front door, a bronze plaque details the club's founding, the clubhouse's development, and its dedication conducted by the NSGW. Another plaque explains the placement of the club's building was listed on the National Register of Historic Places (NRHP) on January 7, 2015.

== See also ==
- NRHP listings in Sonoma County, California
- List of women's clubs in the United States
