= Orange Lawn =

Historic mansion in Sonoma, California, US

- U.S. National Register of Historic Places
- Young Mansion
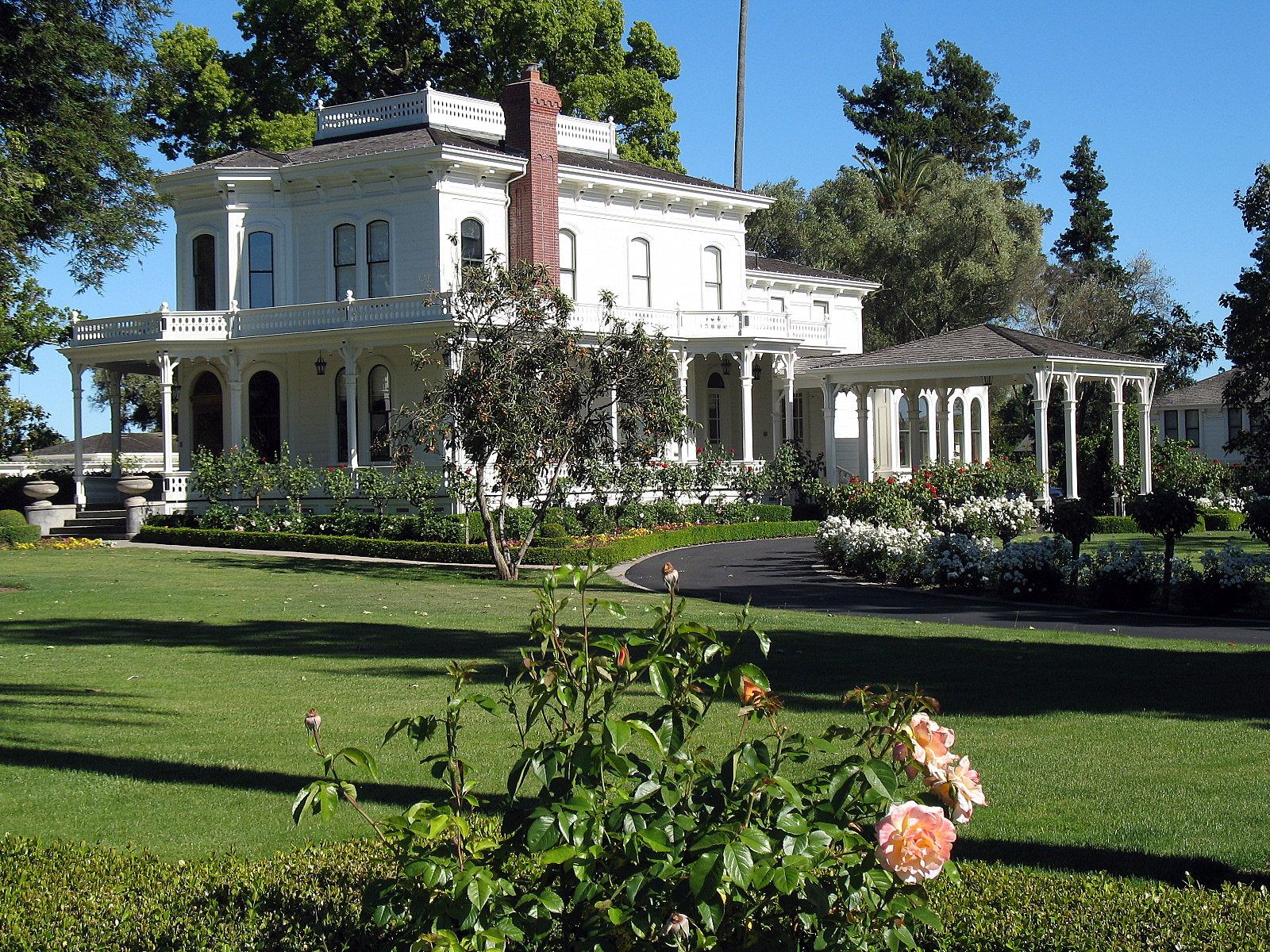
- Orange Lawn Mansion

- Location within California
- Location: 645 Charles Van Damme Way, Sonoma, California, U.S.
- Coordinates: 38°17′22″N 122°26′46″W
- Area: 4,689 square feet (435.6 m^{2})
- Built: 1870; 156 years ago
- Architectural style: Victorian architecture in Italianate-style
- NRHP reference No.: 08000529
- Added to NRHP: June 9, 2008

The Orange Lawn, also known as the Young Mansion, is a historic residence located in the Sonoma, California. Built in 1870 by Daniel and Maria Young, it is known for its 19th-century Italianate architecture. The mansion was restored in 1996 and was added to the National Register of Historic Places on June 9, 2008.

== History ==
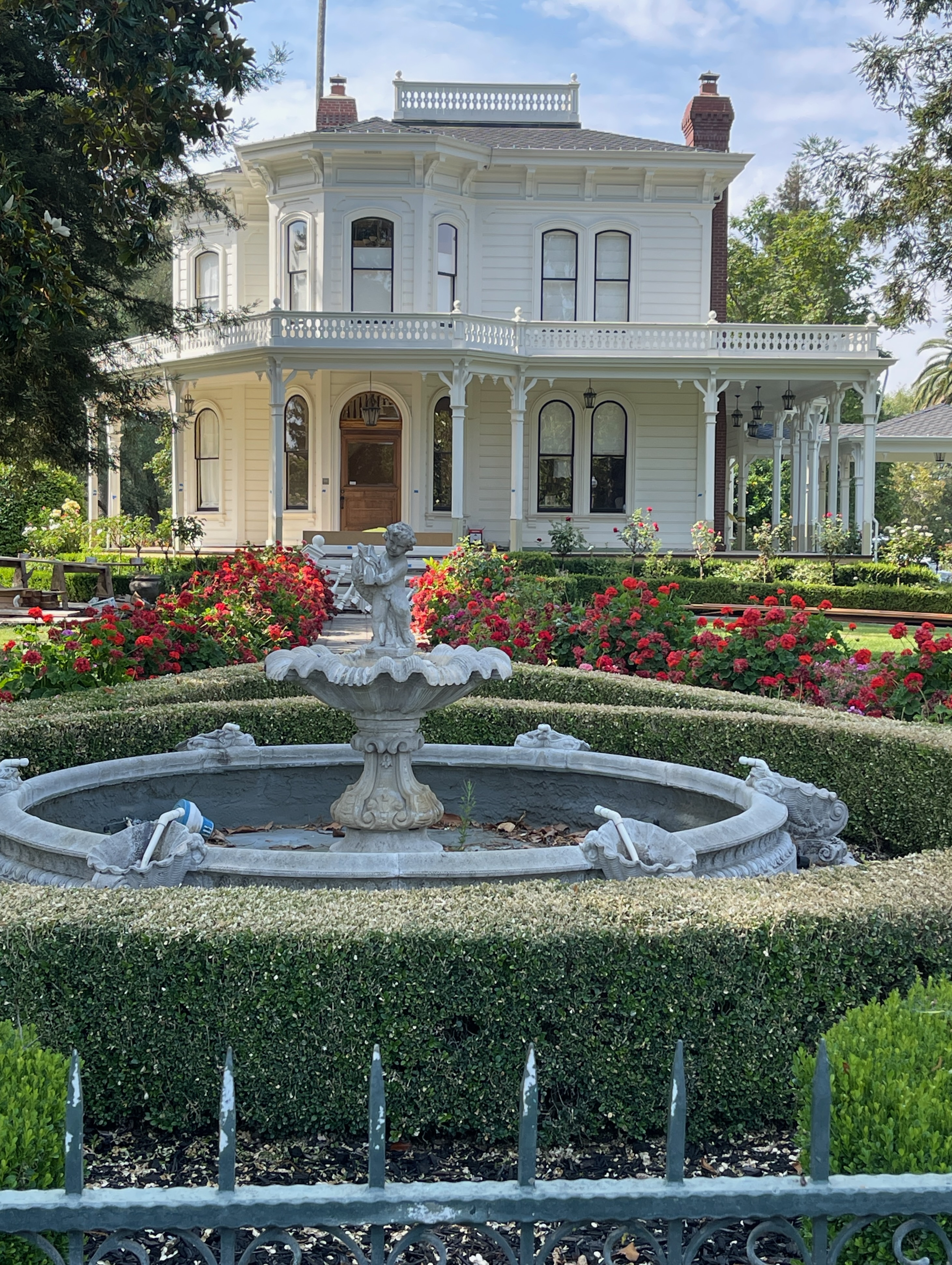
Orange Lawn front entrance with fountain

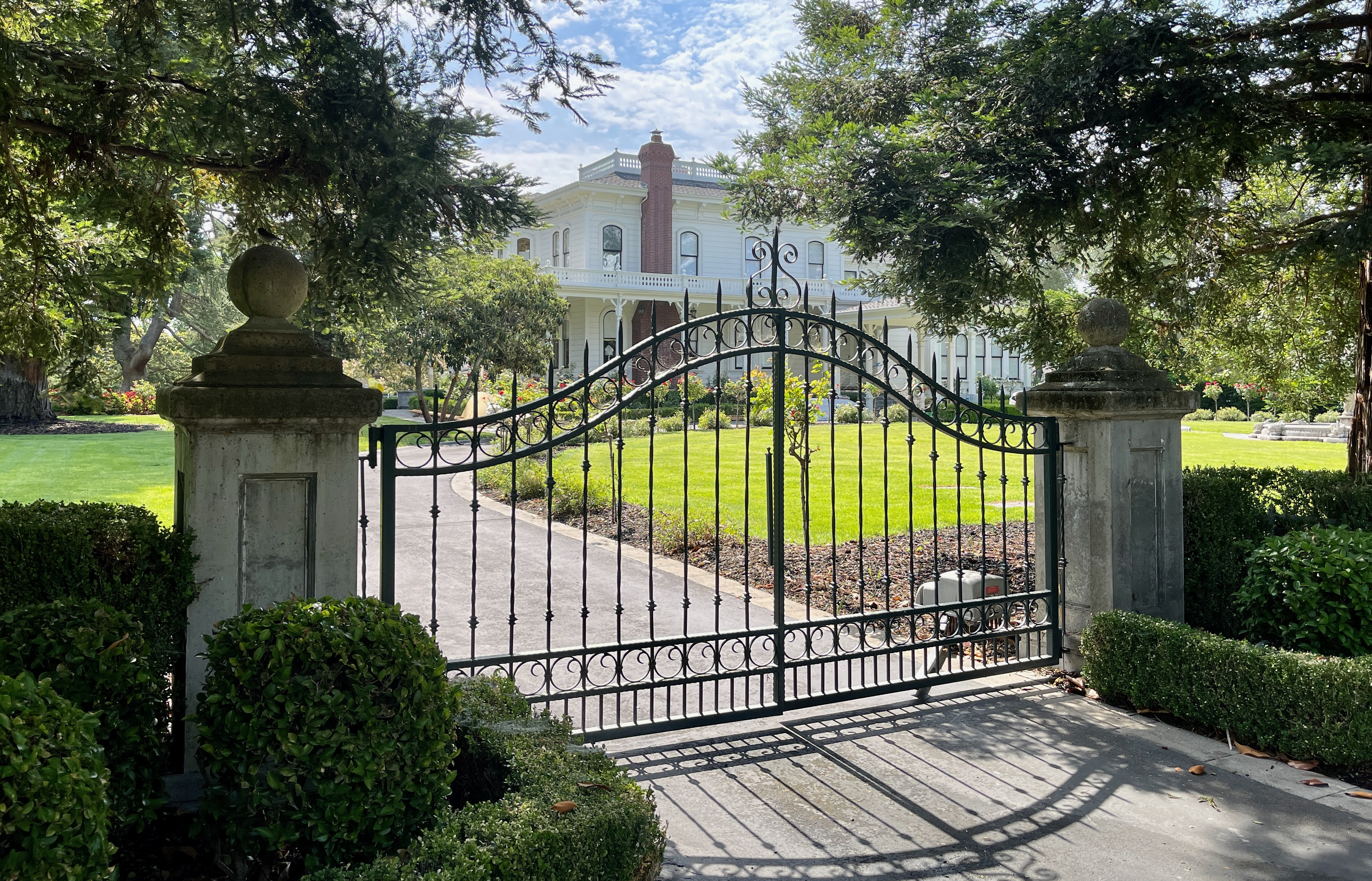
Orange Lawn gate

The Orange Lawn, Young Mansion is situated on land surveyed in 1850 by Jasper O'Farrell, who worked with the Mexican government to map Marin and Sonoma counties. This land was designated as “Outlot 516” by O'Farrell. Mayor William M. Fuller of Sonoma sold the property to Solomon H. Carriger, a pioneer known for acquiring large tracts of land. The original 31.5 acres (12.7 ha) parcel is located four blocks east of Sonoma Plaza, in the city's historic district. The Armstrong Estates and Armstrong Park border the property.

Donna Maria Carrilo purchased the land in 1853. By 1856, Coleman B. Smith acquired the property, where he cultivated fruit, raised pigs, and grew hay. In March 1870, Smith transferred ownership of the property to Daniel Clark Young and his wife, Maria, for $2,500 (equivalent to $63,651 in 2025). Young developed the land further, constructing the Orange Lawn residence and dwelling and auxiliary structures for animals and agricultural machinery. The land included 3.5 acres (1.4 ha) for a total of 35 acres (14 ha). In 1874, Young exhibited his fruit and nuts at the Mechanics' Institute Fair. After twenty-two years, Young sold the home and property in 1892 to W. S. Miller of San Francisco for $4,756 (equivalent to $170,423 in 2025).

After Miller, there were several other owners. Steven Noble Ledson acquired the property in 1987, restored it in 1996, and applied for landmark status with the National Park Service in 2008.

The name "Orange Lawn" likely describes the appearance of summer lawns that encircle the Young mansion and the cultivation of orange and lemon trees on the property.

== Design ==
The Orange Lawn, Young Mansion is a Victorian architecture residence in a Italianate-style located at 645 Charles Van Damme Way in Sonoma, California. It sits on a lot measuring 60 ft (18 m) by 127 ft (39 m), located four blocks east of the Sonoma Plaza.

The two-story house spans 4,689 square feet (435.6 m^{2}) and contains thirteen rooms. The downstairs area, covering 2,558 square feet (237.6 m^{2}), includes an entryway with a spiral staircase, three sitting rooms, a dining room, a kitchen, a sunroom, a basement, two bathrooms, and a laundry room. The upstairs is 2,132 square feet (198.1 m^{2}) and has four bedrooms, three bathrooms, an office, and staircases at both the front and rear. The house has a concrete foundation and basement. The basement, rebuilt in 1996, includes a bathroom, a pantry, a gym, and a wine cellar.

The house features oak floors with geometric patterns, plaster interior walls, and four fireplaces, including updated wood-burning and natural gas options. The exterior has wide shiplap siding with flat pilasters at the corners where the walls meet. The mansion has a hipped roof with wood shingles. Additionally, the house has three full-height bay windows and a wraparound veranda with chamfered posts.

== Historical significance ==
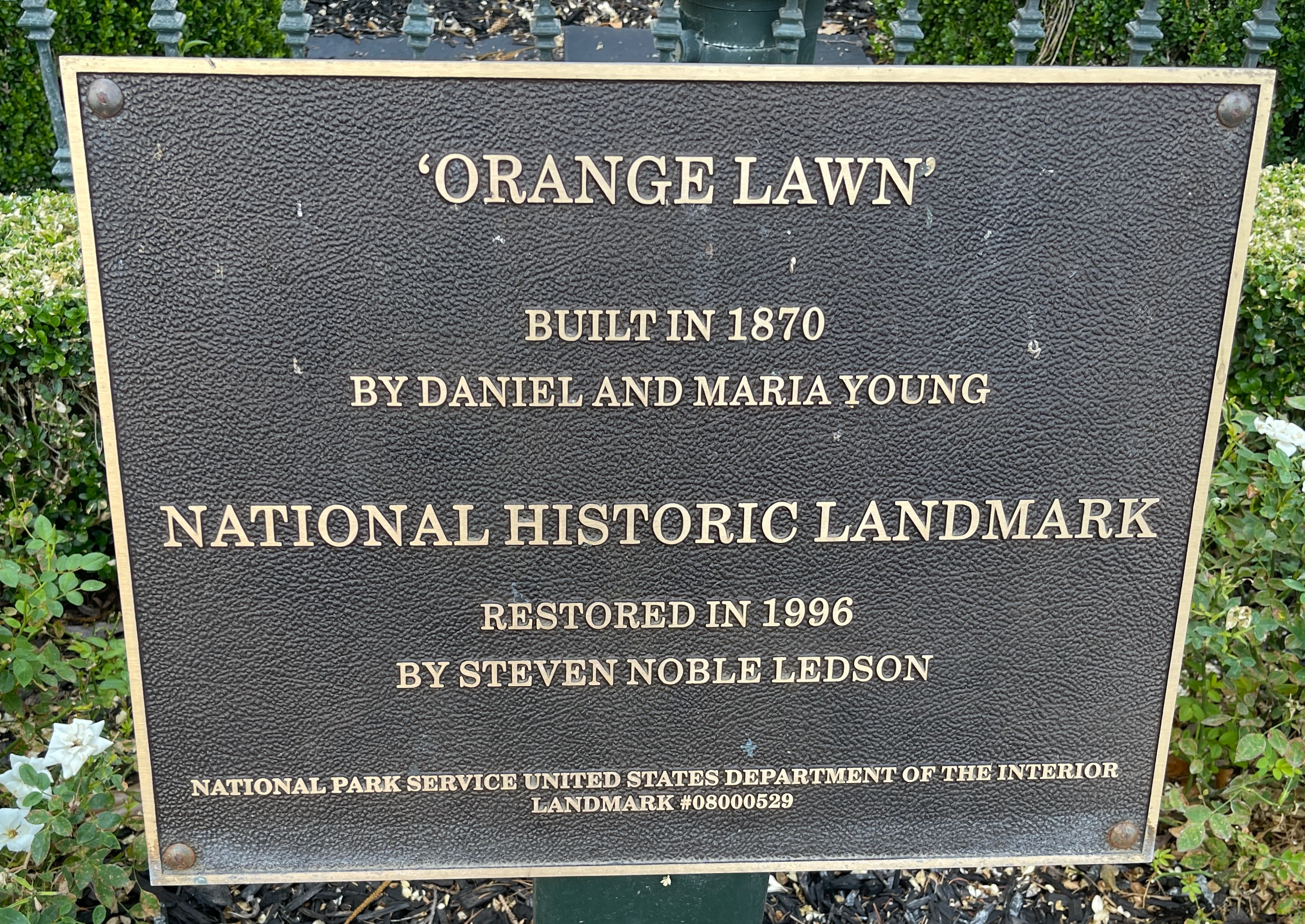
Orange Lawn Plaque

The Orange Lawn, Young Mansion is historically significant based on its 19th-century Italianate architecture and sawn ornament veranda design. Orange Lawn was restored in 1996 and listed the National Register of Historic Places (NRHP) on June 9, 2008.

== See also ==
- National Register of Historic Places listings in Sonoma County, California
