= Sonoma Grammar School =

Historic grammar school building in Sonoma, California, US

- U.S. National Register of Historic Places
- Sonoma Community Center
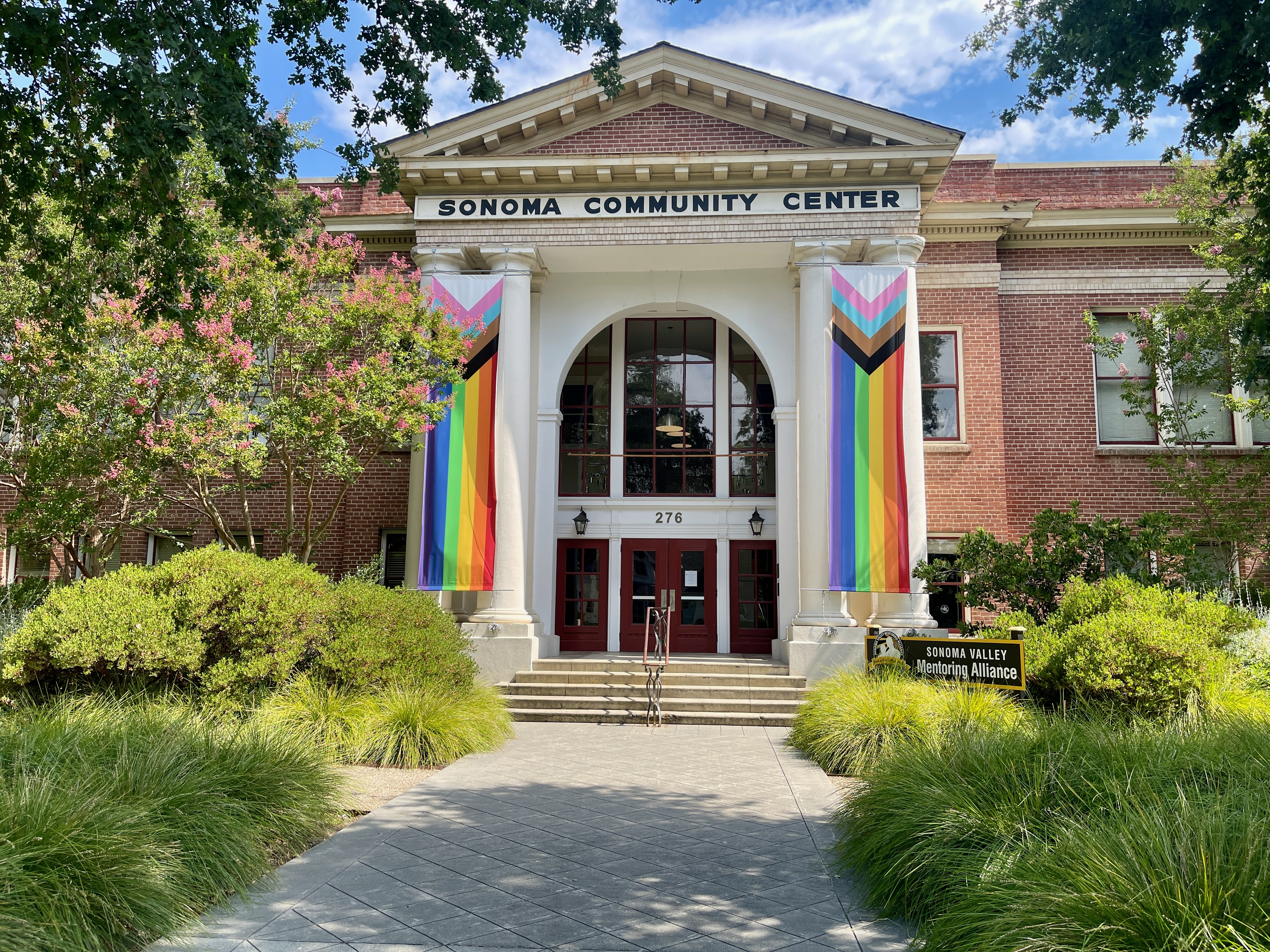
- Sonoma Community Center in 2024

- Location within California
- Location: 276 E. Napa Street, Sonoma, California, U.S.
- Coordinates: 38°17′30″N 122°27′10″W
- Area: 37,260 square feet (3,462 m^{2})
- Built: 1916; 110 years ago
- Architect: Adolph C. Lutgens
- Architectural style: Classical Revival
- Website: sonomacommunitycenter.org
- NRHP reference No.: 80000871
- Added to NRHP: November 28, 1980

Sonoma Grammar School, a historic building in Sonoma, California, was founded in 1916, is now the home of the Sonoma Community Center. It was saved from demolition and added to the National Register of Historic Places in 1980.

== History ==
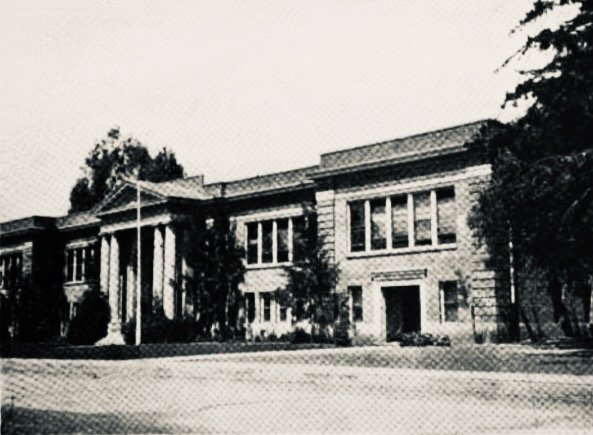
The Sonoma Grammar School (1926)

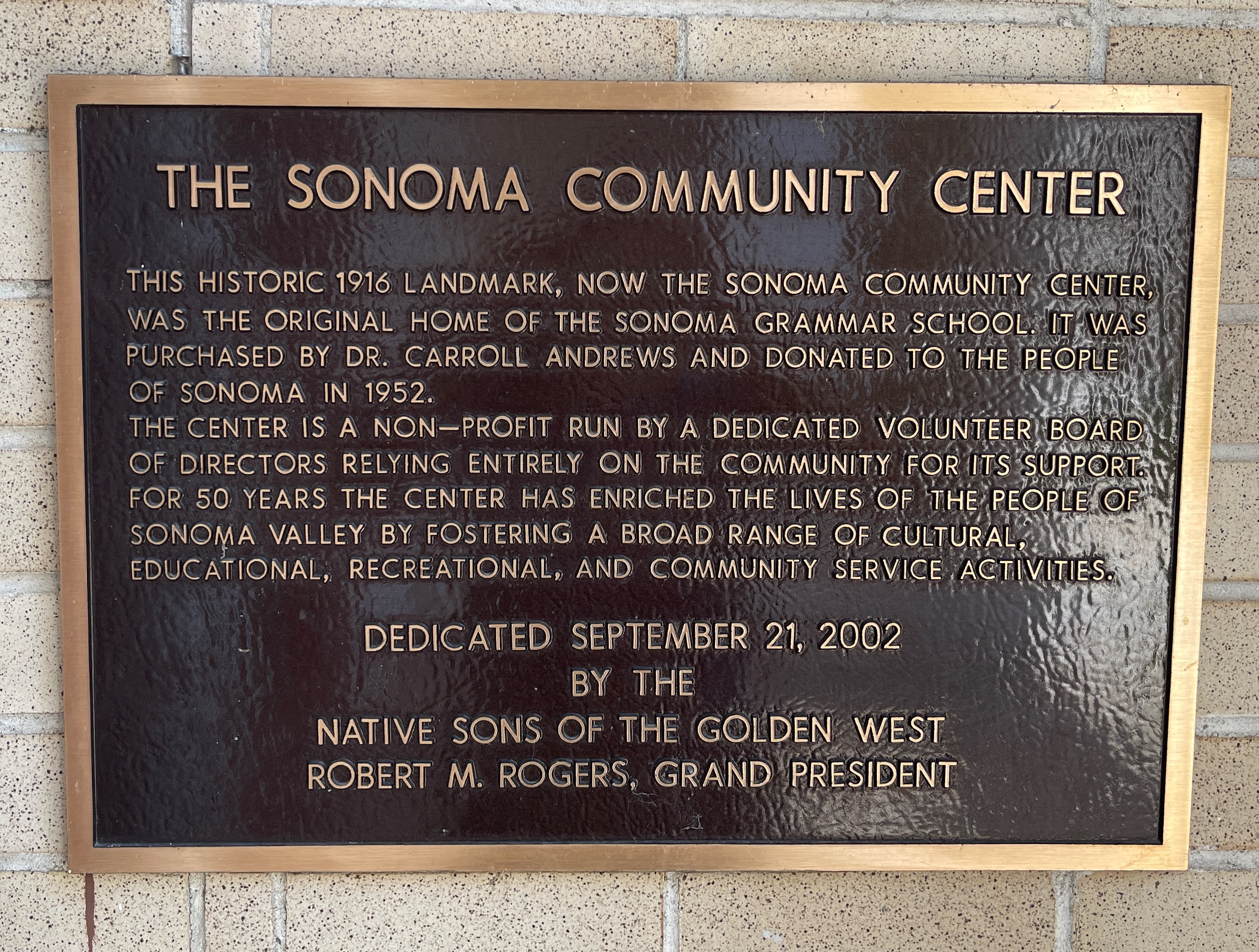
The Sonoma Couunity Center Plaque dedicated on September 21, 2002 by the Native Sons of the Golden West

The Petaluma Argus-Courier first reported on the Sonoma Grammar School on May 2, 1894, when twenty-five students accompanied their teachers on a field trip to the Maxwell's Grove in Sonoma Valley.

On June 23, 1915, the Argus-Courier announced that the formal dedication and opening of the new Grammar School building was expected in time for the resumption of school September 1915. However, the new Grammar School building was not dedicated until Friday evening on May 5, 1916. The Sonoma Grammar School, built at a cost of $30,000 (equivalent to $887,615 in 2025), opened in 1916 with 160 students and Jesse F. Prestwood as the first principal. The building is located on 276 E. Napa Street in Sonoma, California.

The last class graduated in 1948 because the building was found to be seismically unsound. In 1952, Dr. Carroll B. Andrews and his wife saved the building from demolition and set up the Sonoma Community Center with a board of volunteers. A special plaque was dedicated on September 21, 2002, by the Native Sons of the Golden West to the Sonoma Community Center and as the original home of the Sonoma Grammar School. The community center sponsors music and art classes.

== Design ==
The Sonoma Grammar School is a two-story Classical Revival-style building located on a 37,260 square feet (3,462 m^{2}) parcel. Designed by San Francisco architect Adolph C. Lutgens, the front elevation spans 177 ft (54 m) and is divided into five sections. The central section features a portico with a pediment, cornice, and four freestanding columns. The Sonoma architect Victor described the building as "one of the few remaining examples of early 1900s elementary school architecture."

The front windows are arranged in six bays, each with five windows. The east and west wings were added in 1927. Inside, the building includes concrete stairyways with oak handrails, 12 ft (3.7 m) high ceilings, and Douglas fir panel doors. The school's west wing houses a theater-auditorium with a seating capacity of 200 people.

== In popular culture ==
In June 1996, the former Sonoma Grammar School building was one of the settings for Wes Craven's movie Scream.

== Historical significance ==
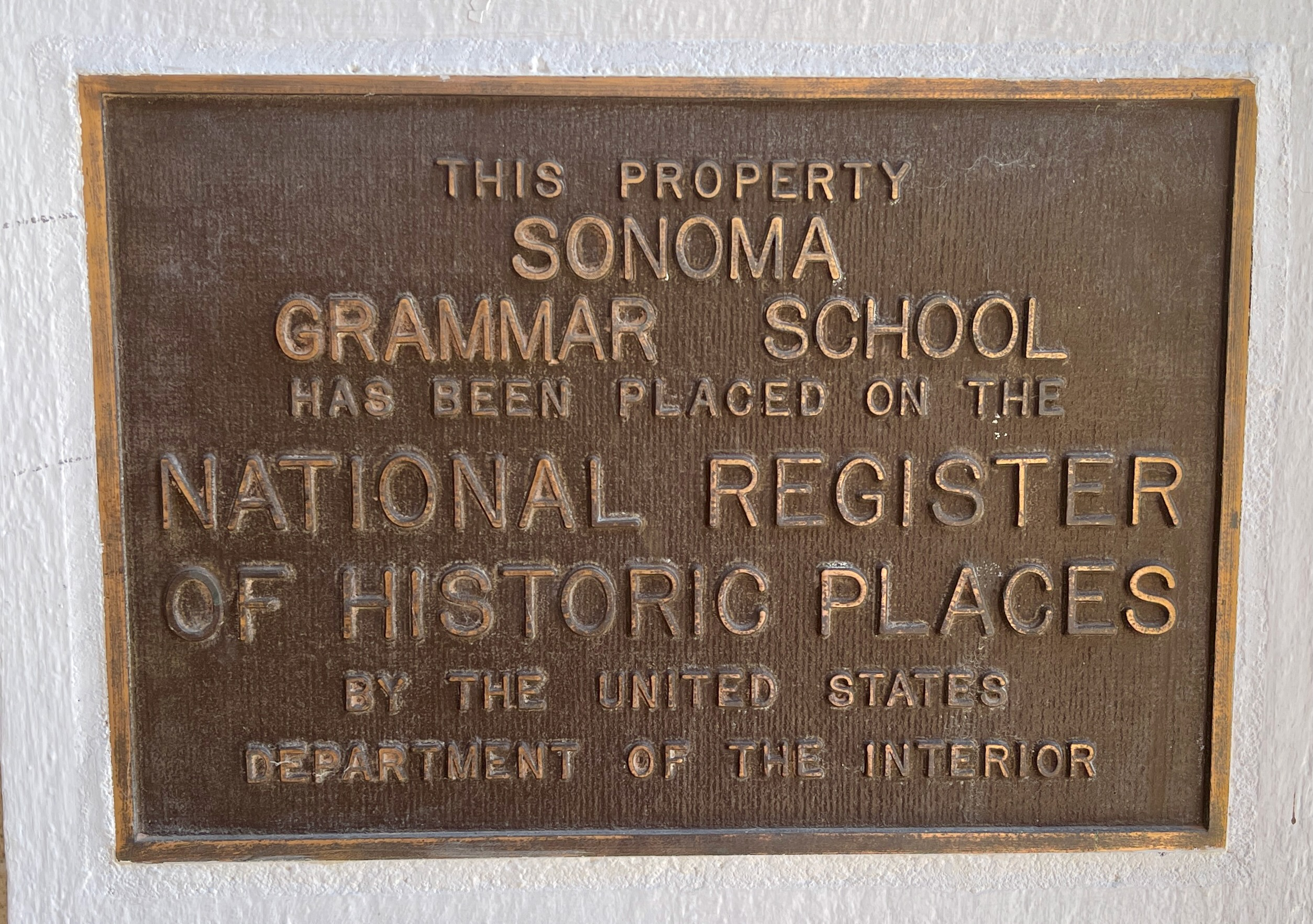
Sonoma Grammar School Plaque

The building was listed on the National Register of Historic Places (NRHP) on November 28, 1980.

The Neoclassical Revival design was created by Adolph C. Lutgens, who also designed the Healdsburg Carnegie Library.

== See also ==
- National Register of Historic Places listings in Sonoma County, California
