= United States Post Office (Petaluma, California) =

United States historic post office

- U.S. Post Office
- U.S. National Register of Historic Places
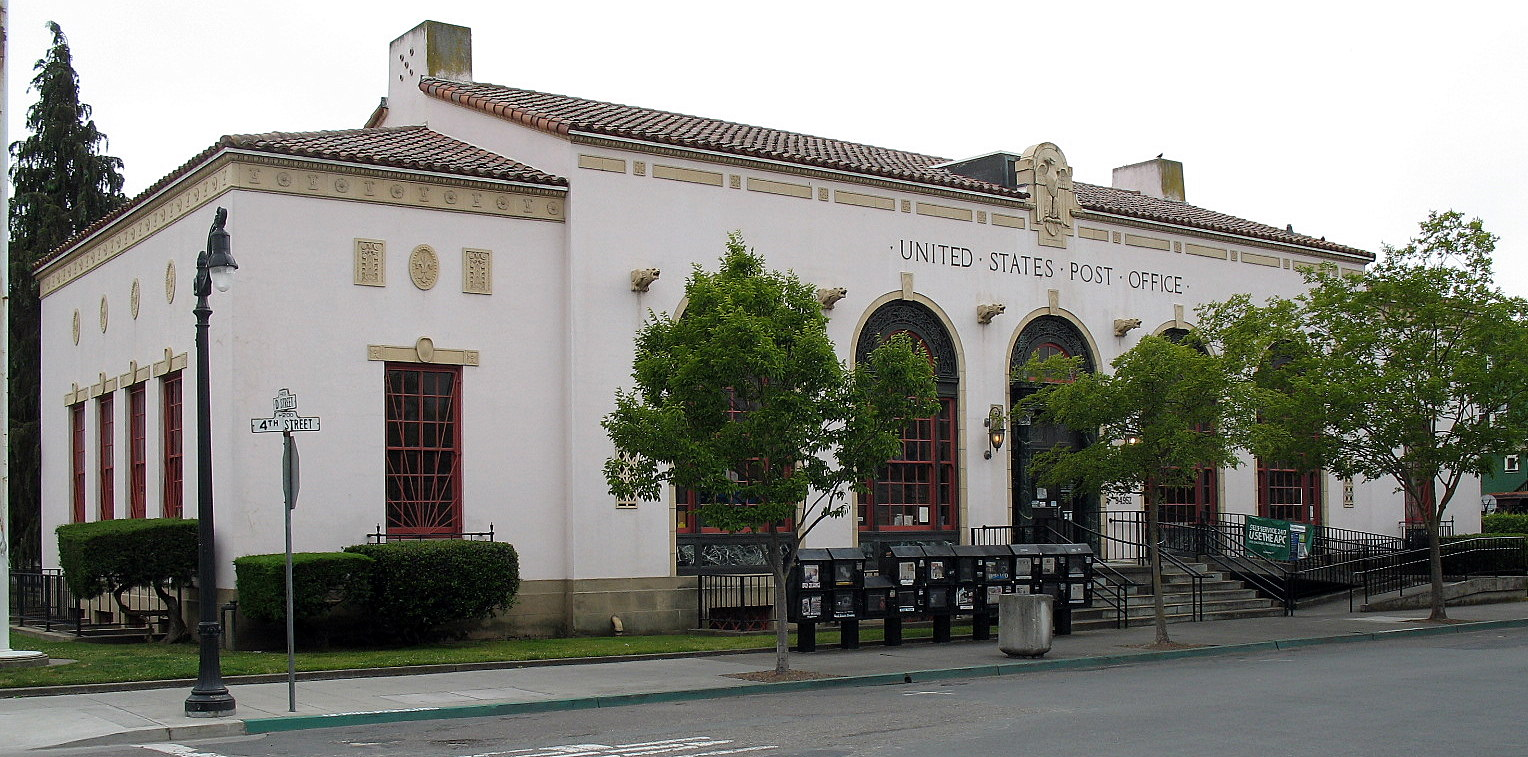
- as of 2010

- Location within California Location within the United States
- Location: 120 Fourth Street, Petaluma, California
- Coordinates: 38°13′54″N 122°38′15″W
- Area: 0.75 acres (0.30 ha)
- Built: 1933
- Architects: James A. Wetmore and Louis A. Simon
- Architectural style: Mission/Spanish Revival
- MPS: US Post Office in California 1900-1941 TR
- NRHP reference No.: 85000140
- Added to NRHP: January 11, 1985

The United States Post Office in Petaluma, California, is located at 120 West Fourth Street. The building, completed in 1933, has been listed on the National Register of Historic Places since 1985.

The building is in the Spanish Colonial Revival style with some Gothic touches. Its front side (facing Fourth Street) presents five rounded arches surmounted by a terracotta frieze. The front portion of the roof is covered with interlocking clay tiles.

Its NRHP nomination states: "The Petaluma Post Office derives its significance from its relation to the federal building programs of the 1920s and 1930s as they developed in California. It is an example of a style transitional between the classicism of the twenties and the Starved Classical style of the thirties."

== See also ==
- National Register of Historic Places listings in Sonoma County, California
- List of United States post offices
