= Temelec Hall =

Historical place in Sonoma County, United States

- U.S. National Register of Historic Places
- California Historical Landmark
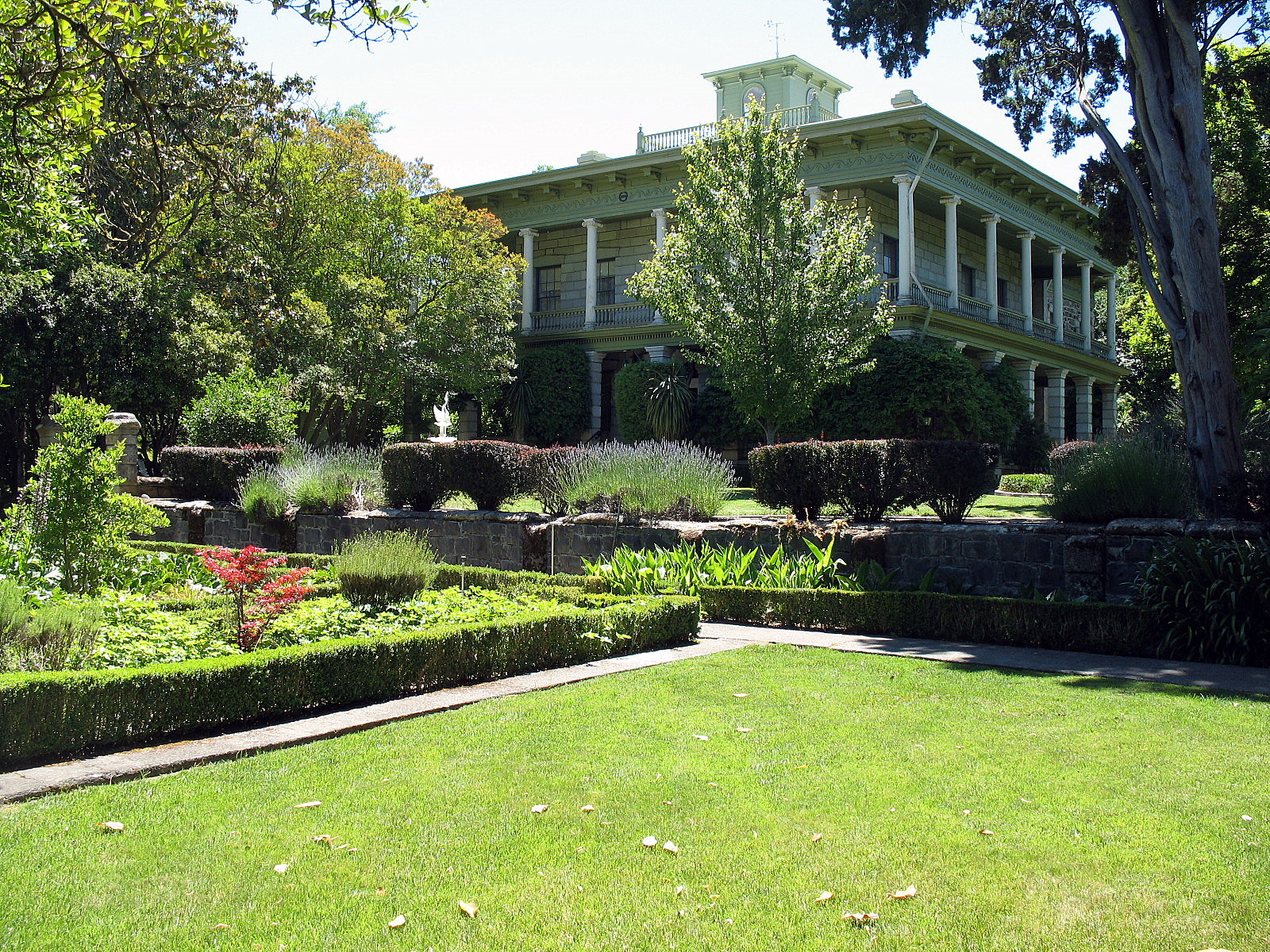
- Temelec Hall

- Location within California Location within the United States
- Location: 220 Temelec Circle, Sonoma, California
- Coordinates: 38.33729°N 122.0155°W
- Built: 1858, 168 years ago
- Architectural style: East Coast Federalist
- NRHP reference No.: 06000312
- CHISL No.: 237

Significant dates
- Added to NRHP: April 19, 2006
- Designated CHISL: June 10, 1936

Temelec Hall is historical building built in 1858, in Sonoma, California in Sonoma County, California. The Temelec Hall is a California Historical Landmark No. 496 listed on June 10, 1936. Temelec Hall is also a National Register of Historic Places April 19, 2006. Temelec Hall was built by Captain Granville P. Swift (1821-1875), a member of the Bear Flag Party and took part in the short Mexican–American War in 1846–1848. Swift was the great-grandnephew to Daniel Boone. Swift found gold in 1849 California Gold Rush. With the gold, Swift built the building with stone quarried here by native labor. General Persifor Frazer Smith, a United States Army commander in lived in a small house near Temelec Hall in 1849. After Swift Temelec Hall was sold a few times. In 1915 it was sold to the Coblentz family, who restored the run down building. Coblentz family sold the Hall and it lands in 1961, to a developer. The developer built the Temelec retirement community with the Hall as historical centerpiece.

A historical marker is at Temelec Hall, placed by the by Native Sons of the Golden West in 2008.

== See also ==
- California Historical Landmarks in Sonoma County
- National Register of Historic Places listings in Sonoma County, California
