= List of National Historic Landmarks in California =

This is a complete List of National Historic Landmarks in California. The United States National Historic Landmark (NHL) program is operated under the auspices of the National Park Service, and recognizes structures, districts, objects, and similar resources nationwide according to a list of criteria of national significance. The listings in the state of California express the diversity of California's heritage, including pre-Columbian peoples, the Spanish and Mexican periods, maritime activity, space exploration, and many other themes.

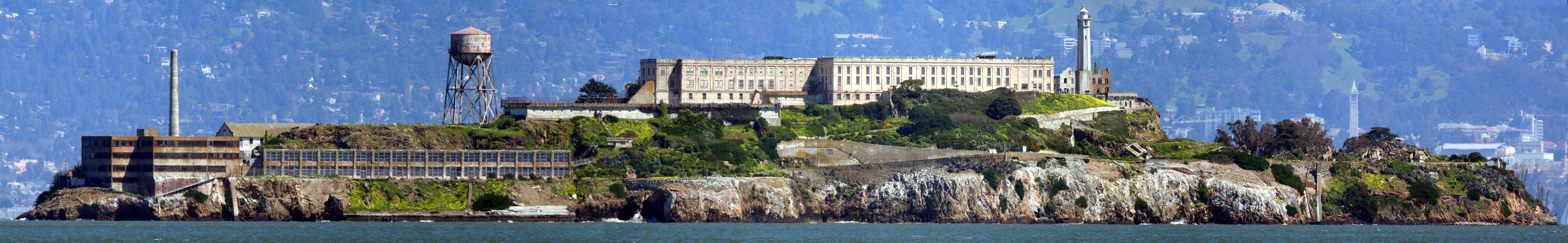
Alcatraz Island in San Francisco Bay, a National Historic Landmark since 1986

The table below lists all 150 sites, along with added detail and description. The sites are distributed across 36 of California's 58 counties.

== Key ==
	National Historic Landmark
^{†}	National Historic Landmark District
^{#}	National Historic Site, National Historical Park, National Memorial, or National Monument
^{*}	Delisted Landmark

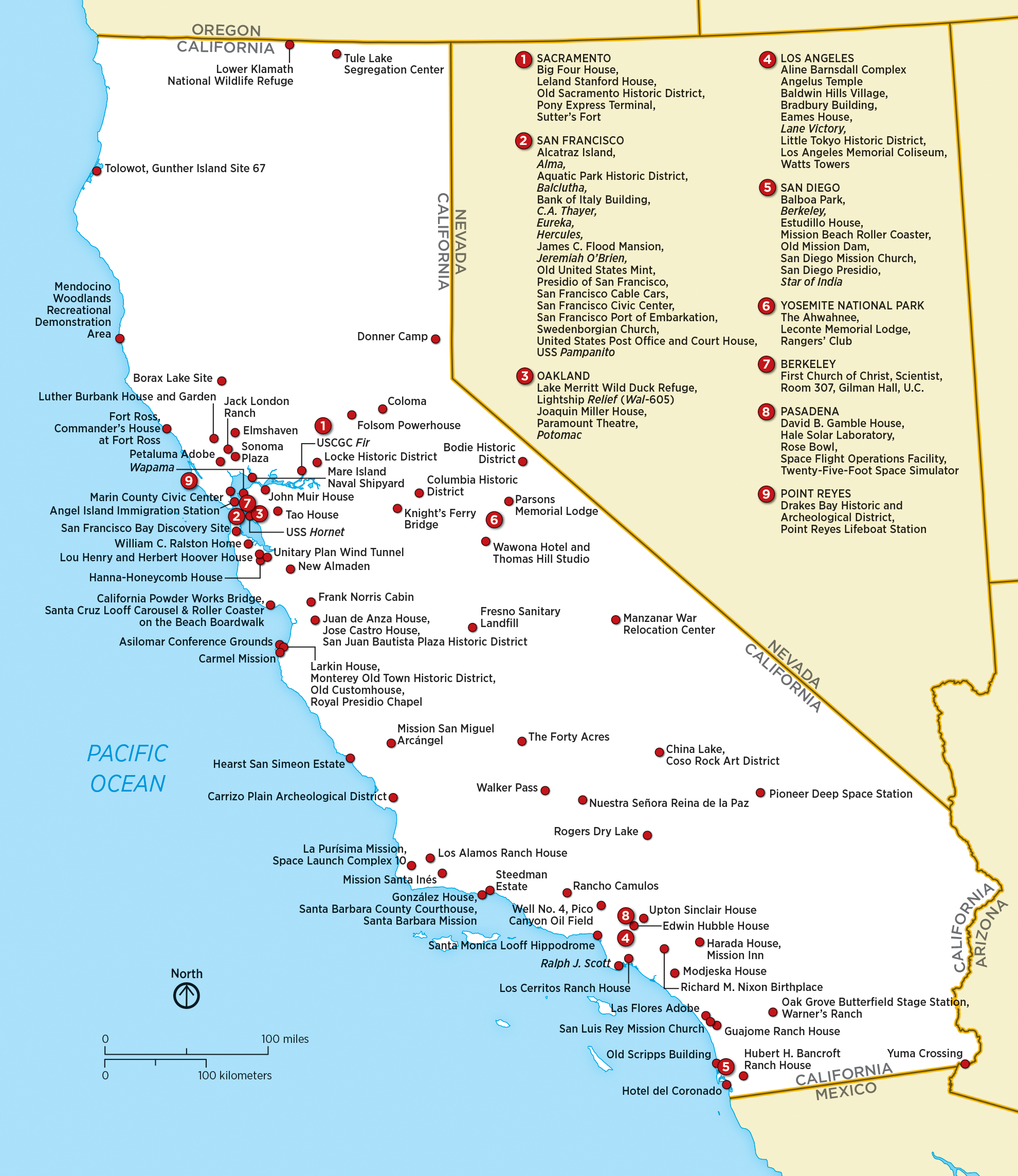
California National Historic Landmarks

== Current NHLs ==
One site, Yuma Crossing and Associated Sites, is shared with Arizona and is listed by the National Park Service in that state. Lower Klamath National Wildlife Refuge is shared with Oregon but credited to California.

	Landmark name	Image	Date designated	Location	County	Description
1	The Abbey, Joaquin Miller House	The Abbey, Joaquin Miller House	December 29, 1962 (#66000204)	Oakland; 37°48′45″N 122°11′08″W	Alameda	Joaquin Miller, known as the "Poet of the Sierras", lived here from 1886 until his death in 1913.
2	The Ahwahnee	The Ahwahnee	May 28, 1987 (#77000149)	Yosemite National Park; 37°44′45″N 119°34′27″W	Mariposa	National Park Service-built and operated hotel in Yosemite National Park; designed by Gilbert Stanley Underwood; exemplifies National Park Service Rustic architecture.
3^{†}	Alcatraz Island	Alcatraz Island	January 17, 1986 (#76000209)	San Francisco; 37°49′35″N 122°25′21″W	San Francisco	Former maximum security Federal prison; Frank Morris escaped, but few others did; part of Golden Gate National Recreation Area; visited by tourist ferries.
4	Alma (scow schooner)	Alma (scow schooner)	June 7, 1988 (#75000179)	San Francisco; 37°48′28″N 122°25′15″W	San Francisco	Flat-bottomed scow schooner that was built in 1891 and used in San Francisco Bay and Sacramento-San Joaquin River Delta. Now part of the San Francisco Maritime National Historical Park. Official plaque located in the San Francisco Maritime National Historical Park Visitor Center, located at the corner of Hyde and Jefferson streets.
5	Angelus Temple	Angelus Temple	April 27, 1992 (#92001875)	Los Angeles; 34°04′35″N 118°15′41″W	Los Angeles	Church built by and for Aimee Semple McPherson, evangelical sensation of the 1920s and 1930s.
6	Juan de Anza House	Juan de Anza House	April 15, 1970 (#70000140)	San Juan Bautista; 36°50′37″N 121°32′07″W	San Benito	One-story adobe house typical of Mexican era, later "Americanized", also in typical way.
7^{†}	Aquatic Park Historic District	Aquatic Park Historic District	May 28, 1987 (#84001183)	San Francisco; 37°48′23″N 122°25′25″W	San Francisco	Streamline Moderne beach, pier, and public bathhouse built by the WPA in 1936. Official plaque located in the San Francisco Maritime National Historical Park Visitor Center, located at the corner of Hyde and Jefferson Streets.
8^{†}	Asilomar Conference Grounds	Asilomar Conference Grounds	February 27, 1987 (#87000823)	Pacific Grove; 36°37′11″N 121°55′53″W	Monterey	Arts and Crafts style conference center built for the YWCA by Julia Morgan in 1913.
9^{†}	Balboa Park	Balboa Park	December 22, 1977 (#77000331)	San Diego; 32°43′53″N 117°08′43″W	San Diego	1,200 acre (4.9 km^{2}) urban cultural complex in San Diego. Reserved in 1855, it is one of the oldest public recreation sites in the US. It includes open areas and vegetation as well as museums, theaters, gardens, shops, restaurants and the San Diego Zoo.
10	Balclutha (square-rigger)	Balclutha (square-rigger)	February 4, 1985 (#76000178)	San Francisco; 37°48′36″N 122°25′21″W	San Francisco	The only remaining square rigged ship in the San Francisco Bay area, it was built in 1886 and served on several different trade routes. It is now part of the San Francisco Maritime National Historical Park. Official plaque located in the San Francisco Maritime National Historical Park Visitor Center, located at the corner of Hyde and Jefferson streets.
11^{†}	Baldwin Hills Village	Baldwin Hills Village	January 3, 2001 (#93000269)	Baldwin Hills; 34°01′11″N 118°21′39″W	Los Angeles	Now known as Village Green, this 627 unit condo complex was one of the first new planned communities when it was built between 1935 and 1942.
12	Hubert H. Bancroft Ranch House	Hubert H. Bancroft Ranch House	December 29, 1962 (#66000227)	Spring Valley; 32°44′44″N 117°00′07″W	San Diego	Adobe home of historian and ethnologist Hubert Howe Bancroft, publisher of many Pacific Coast histories and books on Native American culture.
13	Bank of Italy Building	Bank of Italy Building	June 2, 1978 (#78000754)	San Francisco; 37°47′40″N 122°24′11″W	San Francisco	Became the headquarters of Bank of Italy in 1908 (precursor of the Bank of America); also known as the Clay-Montgomery Building.
14	Aline Barnsdall Complex (Hollyhock House)	Aline Barnsdall Complex (Hollyhock House)	March 29, 2007 (#71000143)	Los Angeles; 34°06′00″N 118°17′41″W	Los Angeles	Hollyhock House, a building designed by Frank Lloyd Wright and built in 1919–1921 for Aline Barnsdall. Now the centerpiece of the Barnsdall Art Park.
15	Berkeley (ferry)	Berkeley (ferry)	December 14, 1990 (#90002220)	San Diego; 32°43′01″N 117°10′21″W	San Diego	First propeller-driven ferry on the west coast; currently the main "building" of the Maritime Museum of San Diego.
16	Big Four House	Big Four House	July 4, 1961 (#76000541)	Sacramento; 38°34′58″N 121°30′12″W	Sacramento	Built in 1852; house where Collis Huntington, Mark Hopkins, Leland Stanford, and Charles Crocker organized the Central Pacific railway and founded the Southern Pacific Railroad.
17^{†}	Bodie Historic District	Bodie Historic District	July 4, 1961 (#66000213)	Bodie; 38°12′44″N 119°00′44″W	Mono	Established in 1859, it became a Gold Rush boomtown in 1876. It is currently a State park preserved in arrested decay, neither restored nor destroyed. It is one of very few towns of this type to survive untouched.
18	Borax Lake Site	Borax Lake Site	September 20, 2006 (#91001424)	Clearlake	Lake	The archaeological type site of the unique Paleo-Indian Clovis people known as the Post Pattern. This site extended their known range and introduced an unusual lake shore dwelling population.
19	Bradbury Building	Bradbury Building	May 5, 1977 (#71000144)	Los Angeles; 34°03′03″N 118°14′53″W	Los Angeles	1893 Italian Renaissance architectural landmark. Known for its striking interiors and cage elevators. It has been used extensively as a location in films such as Blade Runner.
20	Luther Burbank House and Garden	Luther Burbank House and Garden	June 19, 1964 (#66000241)	Santa Rosa; 38°26′10″N 122°42′44″W	Sonoma	City park containing the former home, greenhouse, gardens, and grave of noted American horticulturist Luther Burbank.
21	C.A. Thayer (schooner)	C.A. Thayer (schooner)	November 13, 1966 (#66000229)	San Francisco; 37°48′28″N 122°25′16″W	San Francisco	Schooner built in 1895; now preserved at the San Francisco Maritime National Historical Park; worked in lumber trade to San Francisco from Washington, Oregon, and Northern California. Official plaque located in the San Francisco Maritime National Historical Park Visitor Center, located at the corner of Hyde and Jefferson Streets.
22	California Powder Works Bridge	California Powder Works Bridge	February 27, 2015 (#15000279)	Santa Cruz; 37°00′38″N 122°02′38″W	Santa Cruz	A 1872 covered bridge that is one of the best-preserved national examples of the Smith truss design.
23	Carmel Mission	Carmel Mission	October 9, 1960 (#66000214)	Carmel; 36°32′28″N 121°55′07″W	Monterey	The second Roman Catholic California Mission Church, this was the headquarters of the padre presidente, Father Fermin Francisco de Lasuen. It was destroyed in the mid-19th century and restored in 1884 and 1920. It remains a parish church today.
24^{†}	Carrizo Plain Archeological District	Carrizo Plain Archeological District	March 2, 2012 (#01000509)	San Luis Obispo; 35°11′29″N 119°43′34″W	San Luis Obispo	Historically important and environmentally sensitive grassland area. It is the largest single native grassland remaining in California.
25	José Castro House	José Castro House	May 15, 1970 (#70000141)	San Juan Bautista; 36°50′34″N 121°32′05″W	San Benito	Historic adobe home built by José Castro, Commandant General of Northern California. It is part of the San Juan Bautista State Historic Park, located in the San Juan Bautista Plaza Historic District.
26	Chicano Park	Chicano Park	December 23, 2016 (#100000802)	San Diego; 32°42′01″N 117°08′37″W	San Diego	A community-run park known for its vivid murals celebrating Mexican and Chicano culture, founded after a twelve-day occupation by Mexican-American residents to prevent the city from building a parking lot and police substation.
27^{†}	Coloma	Coloma	July 4, 1961 (#66000207)	Coloma; 38°48′00″N 120°53′21″W	El Dorado	Town where the California Gold Rush began when James W. Marshall discovered gold at Sutter's mill on January 24, 1848. Now a ghost town, it is a significant part of the Marshall Gold Discovery State Historic Park
28^{†}	Columbia Historic District	Columbia Historic District	July 4, 1961 (#66000242)	Sonora; 38°02′09″N 120°24′04″W	Tuolumne	Within two years of discovering gold in this town, it was the 3rd largest city in California. The historic district is now an open museum and the best preserved California Gold Rush town.
29	Commander's House, Fort Ross	Commander's House, Fort Ross	May 15, 1970 (#70000150)	Fort Ross; 38°30′52″N 123°14′37″W	Sonoma	Only original structure at Fort Ross, built 1812 by Russians; also known as Rotchev House.
30^{†}	Coso Rock Art District (formerly Big and Little Petroglyph Canyons)	Coso Rock Art District	July 8, 2001 (#99001178)	Naval Air Weapons Station China Lake	Inyo	Over 20,000 Indian petroglyphs are located in this NHLD, which also incorporates two earlier NHLs: Big and Little Petroglyph Canyons. The site is located within Naval Air Weapons Station China Lake.
31	Donner Camp Sites	Donner Camp Sites	January 20, 1961 (#66000218)	Truckee; 39°19′12″N 120°14′30″W	Nevada	Museum and monument to Donner party; trapped by weather during the winter of 1846–1847; resorted to cannibalism to survive
32^{†}	Drakes Bay Historic and Archeological District	Drakes Bay Historic and Archeological District	October 16, 2012 (#12001006)	Drakes Bay; 38°02′03″N 122°56′27″W	Marin	The recognized landing site of Francis Drake in 1579 and Sebastian Rodriguez Cermeño in 1595, and the early interactions between Native Americans and these European visitors.
33	Eames House (Case Study House #8)	Eames House (Case Study House #8)	September 20, 2006 (#06000978)	Pacific Palisades; 34°01′47″N 118°31′10″W	Los Angeles	Built in 1949 by husband-and-wife design pioneers Charles and Ray Eames; also known as Case Study House No. 8.
34^{†}	Elmshaven (Ellen White House)	Elmshaven (Ellen White House)	November 4, 1993 (#93001609)	St. Helena; 38°32′06″N 122°28′41″W	Napa	Ellen Gould White lived and worked here from 1900 until her death in 1915. She was notable for her prophetic ministry which led to the rise of the Seventh-day Adventist Church.
35	Estudillo House	Estudillo House	April 15, 1970 (#70000143)	San Diego; 32°45′15″N 117°11′49″W	San Diego	Adobe house; constructed in 1827; was considered one of the finest houses in Mexican California.
36	Eureka (double-ended ferry)	Eureka (double-ended ferry)	February 4, 1985 (#73000229)	San Francisco; 37°48′27″N 122°25′17″W	San Francisco	Side-wheel paddle steamboat; built in 1890 by the San Francisco and North Pacific Railroad Company; preserved at the San Francisco Maritime National Historical Park. Official plaque located in the San Francisco Maritime National Historical Park Visitor Center, located at the corner of Hyde and Jefferson Streets.
37	USCGC Fir	USCGC Fir	April 27, 1992 (#92001880)	Stockton; 38°09′00″N 121°40′59″W	San Joaquin	174 foot U.S. Coast Guard cutter; lighthouse tender; decommissioned.
38	First Church of Christ, Scientist	First Church of Christ, Scientist	December 22, 1977 (#77000283)	Berkeley; 37°51′56″N 122°15′20″W	Alameda	Church designed by Bernard Ralph Maybeck
39	James C. Flood Mansion	James C. Flood Mansion	November 13, 1966 (#66000230)	San Francisco; 37°47′31″N 122°24′39″W	San Francisco	Mansion of James C. Flood, 19th century silver-baron; first brownstone building built west of the Mississippi River; one of the only buildings on Nob Hill to survive the 1906 San Francisco earthquake and fire; purchased by the Pacific-Union Club after the earthquake
40	Folsom Powerhouse	Folsom Powerhouse	May 29, 1981 (#73000426)	Folsom; 38°40′50″N 121°10′32″W	Sacramento	Built in late 19th century using prison labor from Folsom Prison; first delivered power to Sacramento in 1895; remained in operation until 1952.
41	Fort Ross	Fort Ross	November 5, 1961 (#66000239)	Fort Ross; 38°30′45″N 123°14′34″W	Sonoma	Established by Ivan Kuskov of the Russian-American Company in 1812; thriving settlement from 1812 to 1841
42	Fresno Sanitary Landfill	Fresno Sanitary Landfill	August 7, 2001 (#01001050)	Fresno; 36°42′00″N 119°49′47″W	Fresno	Opened in 1937; first modern landfill in the U.S.; model for other landfills around the country; and one of the longest-lived.
43	David B. Gamble House	David B. Gamble House	December 22, 1977 (#71000155)	Pasadena; 34°09′06″N 118°09′37″W	Los Angeles	Arts and Crafts masterpiece; shows influence from traditional Japanese aesthetics and a certain California spaciousness born of available land and a permissive climate.
44	González House	González House	April 15, 1970 (#70000149)	Santa Barbara; 34°25′27″N 119°41′45″W	Santa Barbara	Built about 1825 by Don Rafael Gonzales; typical of Mexican-era adobe town houses; adobe walls at least 2' thick
45	Guajome Ranch House	Guajome Ranch House	April 15, 1970 (#70000145)	Vista; 33°14′00″N 117°15′14″W	San Diego	Spanish Colonial hacienda with two courtyards.
46	Gunther Island Site 67	Gunther Island Site 67	July 19, 1964 (#66000208)	Eureka; 40°48′36″N 124°10′19″W	Humboldt	An archaeological site surrounding a Wiyot shell midden, located in Tolowot, on Indian Island in Humboldt Bay near Eureka, California. This site helped define the Gunther Pattern in archaeology and was also the site of the 1860 Wiyot Massacre.
47	Hale Solar Observatory	Hale Solar Observatory	December 20, 1989 (#86000103)	Pasadena; 34°07′59″N 118°07′19″W	Los Angeles	Laboratory of George Ellery Hale, inventor of the spectroheliograph, with which he made his discoveries of the solar vortices and magnetic fields of sun spots.
48	Hanna-Honeycomb House	Hanna-Honeycomb House	June 29, 1989 (#78000780)	Palo Alto; 37°24′58″N 122°09′51″W	Santa Clara	Located on Stanford University campus, this was Frank Lloyd Wright's first work in the San Francisco region as well as his first work with non-rectangular structures.
49	Harada House	Harada House	December 14, 1990 (#77000325)	Riverside; 33°59′07″N 117°22′09″W	Riverside	Property involved in 1916–1918 constitutional test of an alien land law; at issue was the rights of the children of a Japanese immigrant
50	Hearst San Simeon Estate	Hearst San Simeon Estate	May 11, 1976 (#72000253)	San Simeon; 35°41′06″N 121°10′04″W	San Luis Obispo	Built by newspaper magnate William Randolph Hearst; open for public tours; Hearst formally named the estate "La Cuesta Encantada".
51	Hercules (tug)	Hercules (tug)	January 17, 1986 (#75000225)	San Francisco; 37°48′30″N 122°25′16″W	San Francisco	This 1907 steam tug is now a museum ship at the San Francisco Maritime National Historical Park. Official plaque located in the San Francisco Maritime National Historical Park Visitor Center, located at the corner of Hyde and Jefferson Streets.
52	Lou Henry and Herbert Hoover House	Lou Henry and Herbert Hoover House	February 4, 1985 (#78000786)	Palo Alto; 37°25′04″N 122°10′09″W	Santa Clara	Designed by Lou Henry Hoover, wife of Herbert Hoover, this is where the Hoovers lived before and after his presidency. It is now the official residence of the president of Stanford University
53	USS Hornet (CVS-12) (aircraft carrier)	USS Hornet (CVS-12) (aircraft carrier)	December 4, 1991 (#91002065)	Alameda; 37°46′22″N 122°18′10″W	Alameda	Essex class aircraft carrier which was commissioned in November 1943. She played a role in the Pacific battles of World War II and then went on to serve in the Vietnam War. It also recovered the Apollo Astronauts as they returned from the Moon.
54	Hotel del Coronado	Hotel del Coronado	May 5, 1977 (#71000181)	Coronado; 32°40′51″N 117°10′36″W	San Diego	The largest beach resort on the North American Pacific Coast, this Victorian building is an iconic symbol of San Diego.
55	Edwin Hubble House	Edwin Hubble House	December 8, 1976 (#76000494)	San Marino; 34°07′24″N 118°07′17″W	Los Angeles	Home of astronomer Edwin Hubble from 1925 until his death in 1953.
56	Jeremiah O'Brien (Liberty ship)	Jeremiah O'Brien (Liberty ship)	January 14, 1986 (#78003405)	San Francisco; 37°48′23″N 122°25′43″W	San Francisco	This Liberty ship is a rare survivor of the 6,939-ship armada that stormed Normandy on D-Day, 1944.
57	Knight's Ferry Bridge	Knight's Ferry Bridge	October 16, 2012 (#12001014)	Knights Ferry; 37°49′10″N 120°39′49″W	Stanislaus	A 1863 covered bridge that is one of the best-preserved examples of the Howe truss design.
58	La Purisima Mission	La Purisima Mission	April 15, 1970 (#70000147)	Lompoc; 34°40′18″N 120°25′21″W	Santa Barbara	Now a historical park, it is the only example in California of a "complete" mission complex.
59	Lake Merritt Wild Duck Refuge	Lake Merritt Wild Duck Refuge	May 23, 1963 (#66000205)	Oakland; 37°48′14″N 122°15′33″W	Alameda	Now known as Lake Merritt Park, it is notable for being the first official wildlife refuge in the United States, designated in 1870.
60	Lane Victory (victory ship)	Lane Victory (victory ship)	December 14, 1990 (#90002222)	San Pedro; 33°42′52″N 118°16′29″W	Los Angeles	A rare example of a Victory Ship, it is now a still operational museum ship which makes 6 public cruises a year to Catalina Island.
61	Larkin House	Larkin House	December 19, 1960 (#66000215)	Monterey; 36°35′56″N 121°53′44″W	Monterey	This house, part of the larger landmark district Monterey State Historic Park, combined Spanish building techniques with New England features, creating the Monterey Colonial style of architecture.
62	Las Flores Adobe	Las Flores Adobe	November 24, 1968 (#68000021)	Camp Pendleton; 33°18′00″N 117°27′40″W	San Diego	An estancia halfway between two missions, it is now part of a Boy Scout camp located inside Camp Pendleton just off of Interstate 5.
63	Leconte Memorial Lodge	Leconte Memorial Lodge	May 28, 1987 (#77000148)	Yosemite National Park; 37°44′18″N 119°34′42″W	Mariposa	Built by the Sierra Club in 1903 in honor of Joseph LeConte, one of the founding members of the Sierra Club. It was a Yosemite visitors center, but is now run by the Sierra Club as a museum and library.
64	Lightship WAL-605, Relief	Lightship WAL-605, Relief	December 20, 1989 (#89002462)	Oakland; 37°47′44″N 122°16′50″W	Alameda	A lightvessel now located in Oakland
65^{†}	Little Tokyo Historic District	Little Tokyo Historic District	June 12, 1995 (#86001479)	Los Angeles; 34°03′02″N 118°14′22″W	Los Angeles	An ethnic Japanese American district in downtown Los Angeles, one of three official Japantowns in the United States.
66^{†}	Locke Historic District	Locke Historic District	December 14, 1990 (#71000174)	Locke; 38°15′02″N 121°30′35″W	Sacramento	The largest remaining example of a historic rural Chinese American community, built in 1915.
67	Jack London Ranch	Jack London Ranch	December 29, 1962 (#66000240)	Glen Ellen; 38°21′02″N 122°32′35″W	Sonoma	Home of Jack London from 1905 until his death.
68	Los Alamos Ranch House	Los Alamos Ranch House	April 15, 1970 (#70000148)	Los Alamos; 34°45′10″N 120°19′20″W	Santa Barbara	A good example of the Mexican style single story adobe ranch-house located next to the El Camino Real. It was often used as an overnight stop when travelling between Santa Barbara and Monterey.
69	Los Angeles Memorial Coliseum	Los Angeles Memorial Coliseum	July 27, 1984 (#84003866)	Los Angeles; 34°00′50″N 118°17′16″W	Los Angeles	The only stadium in the world which has hosted the Summer Olympic Games (1932 /1984), the World Series (1959) and the Super Bowl (1967 /1973). It is currently the home of the USC Trojans football team.
70	Los Cerritos Ranch House	Los Cerritos Ranch House	April 15, 1970 (#70000135)	Long Beach; 33°50′11″N 118°11′40″W	Los Angeles	Largest adobe home built in Southern California during Mexican era.
71^{†}	Lower Klamath National Wildlife Refuge	Lower Klamath National Wildlife Refuge	January 12, 1965 (#66000238)	Dorris, CA and Klamath Falls, OR; 41°58′00″N 121°46′00″W	Siskiyou, CA and Klamath, OR	This national wildlife refuge, established in 1908, was the first large block of public land set aside for wildlife management purposes. Because of the refuge's extensive overlap with the Klamath Basin water reclamation project, it has become an ongoing example of the tensions between conservation and economic demands in public land management.
72	Manzanar War Relocation Center	Manzanar War Relocation Center	February 4, 1985 (#76000484)	Independence; 36°43′41″N 118°09′16″W	Inyo	The most widely known American forced relocation camp where 11,070 Japanese Americans were imprisoned during World War II.
73^{†}	Mare Island Naval Shipyard	Mare Island Naval Shipyard	May 15, 1975 (#75002103)	Vallejo; 38°06′N 122°16′W	Solano	The first US naval facility on the West Coast, it built and supported WWII naval forces as well as nuclear submarines. It closed in 1996 and is currently under redevelopment which is threatening the historic buildings.
74	Marin County Civic Center	Marin County Civic Center	July 17, 1991 (#91002055)	San Rafael; 37°59′52″N 122°31′50″W	Marin	The last major commission by Frank Lloyd Wright, this government run complex hosts a variety of events including the county fair. Its architecture has led to inclusion in or inspiration for several films. It is also known for two violent attacks in the 1970s.
75^{†}	Mendocino Woodlands Recreational Demonstration Area	Mendocino Woodlands Recreational Demonstration Area	September 25, 1997 (#97001262)	Mendocino; 39°19′43″N 123°41′54″W	Mendocino	The only Recreational Demonstration Area built by the Civilian Conservation Corps that's been continually used as a campground. It has been managed by a nonprofit agency since 1949 and remains in use today as Mendocino Woodlands State Park.
76	Mission Beach Roller Coaster	Mission Beach Roller Coaster	February 27, 1987 (#78000753)	San Diego; 32°46′12″N 117°15′00″W	San Diego	One of only two remaining seaside wooden coasters on the West coast, it was built in 1925 by noted coaster builders Prior and Church. It was saved from destruction in 1987, restored, and is still operating today.
77	Mission Inn	Mission Inn	May 5, 1977 (#71000173)	Riverside; 33°58′54″N 117°22′18″W	Riverside	This hotel has become the largest Mission Revival style through progressive additions and embellishments since its first predecessor cottage was built in 1876. In addition to lodgings, it features shops, a chapel, furniture from around the world, and Tiffany windows.
78	Mission San Miguel Arcángel	Mission San Miguel Arcángel	March 20, 2006 (#71000191)	San Miguel; 35°44′41″N 120°41′53″W	San Luis Obispo	The 16th California Mission church remains well preserved and still in use today though under earthquake remediation construction. Inside are murals by Esteban Munrás.
79^{†}	Mission Santa Inés	Mission Santa Inés	January 20, 1999 (#99000630)	Solvang; 34°35′40″N 120°08′12″W	Santa Barbara	The 19th California Mission church was the site of an Indian revolt in 1824. It has undergone restoration since the 1940s and is a working parish church today.
80^{†}	Modjeska House	Modjeska House	December 14, 1990 (#72000244)	Modjeska; 33°42′59″N 117°37′26″W	Orange	Designed by Stanford White, from 1888 to 1906 this was the home of Helena Modjeska, a Polish patriot and Shakespearean actress.
81^{†}	Monterey Old Town Historic District	Monterey Old Town Historic District	April 15, 1970 (#70000137)	Monterey; 36°35′59″N 121°53′37″W	Monterey	Also known as Monterey State Historic Park, this NHLD contains both California's First Theatre, and the Monterey Customs House, where the American flag was first raised over California. It also incorporates the National Historic Landmarked Larkin House known for its leading architecture.
82^{#}	John Muir House	John Muir House	December 29, 1962 (#66000083)	Martinez; 37°59′30″N 122°07′50″W	Contra Costa	John Muir lived here from 1890 until his death in 1914, the time period of some of his most notable achievements including founding the Sierra Club and laying the groundwork for the creation of the National Park Service. It is open to the public.
83	Neutra Studio and Residences (VDL Research House)	Neutra Studio and Residences (VDL Research House)	December 23, 2016 (#100000831)	Los Angeles; 34°05′54″N 118°15′38″W	Los Angeles	Served as the home of architect Richard Neutra, which he and his son Dion designed using his innovations in modern architecture.
84^{†}	New Almaden	New Almaden	July 4, 1961 (#66000236)	San Jose; 37°10′48″N 121°50′08″W	Santa Clara	Also known as Senador, one of the oldest and most productive mercury mines in the United States. It helped ensure the California Gold Rush could take place. Now part of Almaden Quicksilver County Park.
85	Richard M. Nixon Birthplace	Richard M. Nixon Birthplace	May 31, 1973 (#71000171)	Yorba Linda; 33°53′19″N 117°49′08″W	Orange	The birthplace and home of President Richard Milhous Nixon from 1913 to 1922. Now part of the Richard Nixon Presidential Library and Museum
86	Frank Norris Cabin	Frank Norris Cabin	December 29, 1962 (#66000235)	Gilroy; 37°02′11″N 121°42′45″W	Santa Clara	Also known as Redwood Retreat, this was the home of author Frank Norris in the last year of his life.
87^{#}	Nuestra Señora Reina de la Paz	Nuestra Señora Reina de la Paz	October 8, 2012 (#11000576)	Keene; 35°13′24″N 118°33′49″W	Kern	Headquarters of the National Farm Workers Federation, now the Cesar Chavez National Monument. Includes the gravesite of co-founder César Chávez
88	Oak Grove Butterfield Stage Station	Oak Grove Butterfield Stage Station	November 5, 1961 (#66000222)	Warner Springs; 33°23′23″N 116°47′39″W	San Diego	The only surviving station house on the Butterfield Overland Mail stagecoach line. The nearby location of Warner's Ranch was also part of the line.
89	Old Customhouse	Old Customhouse	December 19, 1960 (#66000217)	Monterey; 36°35′46″N 121°53′31″W	Monterey	This 1827 Adobe structure is the oldest public building in California and is where the American Flag was raised, declaring California part of the United States. It is now a museum located inside the Monterey State Historic Park, itself a NHLD.
90	Old Mission Dam	Old Mission Dam	May 21, 1963 (#66000225)	San Diego; 32°50′17″N 117°02′32″W	San Diego	The first major irrigation project on the Pacific coast, this dam supplied water for milling and irrigation at Mission San Diego de Alcalá, 5 miles away. Now part of Mission Trails Regional Park
91^{†}	Old Sacramento Historic District	Old Sacramento Historic District	January 12, 1965 (#66000219)	Sacramento; 38°34′58″N 121°30′12″W	Sacramento	Built up after the California Gold Rush, this historic district also includes the NHL locations of the Pony Express Terminal and the Big Four House.
92	Old Scripps Building	Old Scripps Building	May 20, 1982 (#77000330)	La Jolla; 32°51′52″N 117°15′09″W	San Diego	The first building of Scripps Institution of Oceanography, which is the oldest oceanographic institute in the United States. It formed the starting point of what has become the University of California, San Diego.
93	Old United States Mint	Old United States Mint	July 4, 1961 (#66000231)	San Francisco; 37°46′58″N 122°24′23″W	San Francisco	Built for the San Francisco Mint in 1874 to handle the overflow from the California Gold Rush, this building is affectionately known as The Granite Lady. It is one of the few survivors of the great 1906 San Francisco earthquake and served until 1937.
94	Our Lady of Guadalupe Mission Chapel	Our Lady of Guadalupe Mission Chapel	December 23, 2016 (#100000836)	San Jose; 37°21′09″N 121°50′41″W	Santa Clara	Now McDonnell Hall, the parish hall of Our Lady of Guadalupe Church; important in the life of activist Cesar Chavez.
95	USS Pampanito (submarine)	USS Pampanito (submarine)	January 14, 1986 (#86000089)	San Francisco; 37°48′31″N 122°24′56″W	San Francisco	A Balao-class submarine, she served in World War II before becoming a museum ship and part of the San Francisco Maritime National Park Association. She still has several working parts, including the periscopes and a torpedo tube.
96	Paramount Theatre	Paramount Theatre	May 5, 1977 (#73000395)	Oakland; 37°48′34″N 122°16′05″W	Alameda	The largest theatre on the West Coast when it was built, it is notable for its Art Deco appearance. It is the home of the Oakland East Bay Symphony and the Oakland Ballet and is managed by a nonprofit organization.
97	Parsons Memorial Lodge	Parsons Memorial Lodge	May 28, 1987 (#79000283)	Yosemite National Park; 37°52′36″N 119°22′00″W	Tuolumne	This solidly built structure was the first stone structure in a National Park. It was built by the Sierra Club and is still standing today with only minor variations. It reflects the Bay Area architecture influences of Bernard Maybeck as well as the practical weather concerns of the High Sierra valley.
98	Petaluma Adobe	Petaluma Adobe	April 15, 1970 (#70000151)	Petaluma; 38°15′20″N 122°35′04″W	Sonoma	The largest example of Monterey Colonial architecture in the United States, this adobe structure was the ranch house of General Mariano Guadalupe Vallejo, commandant of the Sonoma Pueblo. It is now the centerpiece of Petaluma Adobe State Historic Park, which is threatened with closure.
99	Pioneer Deep Space Station	Pioneer Deep Space Station	October 3, 1985 (#85002813)	Fort Irwin; 35°23′15″N 116°51′22″W	San Bernardino	NASA's Deep Space Network for tracking uncrewed spacecraft in deep space was inaugurated when this radio telescope (designated DSS 11) became operational in 1958.
100	Point Reyes Lifeboat Station	Point Reyes Lifeboat Station	December 20, 1989 (#85002756)	Point Reyes; 37°59′38″N 122°58′26″W	Marin	Last remaining instance of a USLS rail launched lifeboat station, commonly used on the Pacific coast. This site rescued crews from ships that foundered on Point Reyes. It is now protected as part of the Point Reyes National Seashore.
101^{†}	Pond Farm Pottery Historic District	Pond Farm Pottery Historic District	December 11, 2023 (#100009799)	17000 Armstrong Woods Road; 38°33′08″N 123°00′00″W	Sonoma	
102	Pony Express Terminal	Pony Express Terminal	July 4, 1961 (#66000220)	Sacramento; 38°34′58″N 121°30′15″W	Sacramento	The Western end of the Pony Express, this bank building has also served as the first home of the Supreme Court of California. It is now part of the Old Sacramento State Historic Park, itself a National Historic Landmark District.
103	Potomac (Presidential yacht)	Potomac (Presidential yacht)	December 14, 1990 (#87000068)	Oakland; 37°47′37″N 122°16′44″W	Alameda	Formerly the USCGC Electra, this ship was Franklin Delano Roosevelt’s presidential yacht from 1936 until his death in 1945 and only one of three still existing presidential yachts. On August 3, 1941, she played a decoy role while Roosevelt snuck off to sign the Atlantic Charter. She is now a museum ship.
104	Presidio of San Francisco	Presidio of San Francisco	June 13, 1962 (#66000232)	San Francisco; 37°48′00″N 122°28′00″W	San Francisco	Used as a fortified military base from 1776 to 1995 by Spain, Mexico, and the United States. It is now part of the Golden Gate National Recreation Area and serves a mix of commercial and public uses. It is required to be financially self-supporting by 2013.
105	Ralph J. Scott (fireboat)	Ralph J. Scott (fireboat)	June 30, 1989 (#89001430)	San Pedro; 33°44′29″N 118°16′44″W	Los Angeles	A fireboat for the LAFD from 1925 until its retirement in 2003, it could pump 17,000 US gal/min (1,070 L/s). It is now located near the Los Angeles Maritime Museum.
106	William C. Ralston Home	William C. Ralston Home	November 13, 1966 (#66000234)	Belmont; 37°31′03″N 122°17′10″W	San Mateo	Home of William Chapman Ralston, a San Francisco businessman, founder of the Bank of California, and financier of the Comstock Lode. Now part of Notre Dame de Namur University.
107	Rancho Camulos	Rancho Camulos	February 16, 2000 (#96001137)	Piru; 34°24′20″N 118°45′24″W	Ventura	The home of Ygnacio del Valle, an alcalde of Los Angeles and member of the California State Assembly. The ranch was known as the Home of Ramona because it is likely that the popular 1884 novel Ramona by Helen Hunt Jackson was set there. The novel helped in raising awareness about the Californio lifestyle. It is now a museum.
108	Rangers' Club	Rangers' Club	May 28, 1987 (#87001414)	Yosemite National Park; 37°44′44″N 119°35′12″W	Mariposa	Stephen Tyng Mather, the wealthy first director of the National Park Service personally donated this building to house the newly hired rangers covering Yosemite National Park. Its rustic architecture inspired all National Park construction through WWII.
109	Rogers Dry Lake	Rogers Dry Lake	October 3, 1985 (#85002816)	Edwards Air Force Base; 34°57′00″N 117°52′00″W	Kern and San Bernardino	Centerpiece of Edwards Air Force Base, this endorheic desert salt pan in the Mojave Desert has the world's largest compass rose and the world's longest runway at 7.2 miles. It is one of the alternate Space Shuttle landing sites.
110	Room 307, Gilman Hall, University of California	Room 307, Gilman Hall, University of California	December 21, 1965 (#66000203)	Berkeley; 37°52′15″N 122°15′18″W	Alameda	Room 307 in Gilman Hall at UCB is where Glenn T. Seaborg and his coworkers identified plutonium as a new element on February 23, 1941.
111	Rose Bowl	Rose Bowl	February 27, 1987 (#87000755)	Pasadena; 34°09′34″N 118°10′00″W	Los Angeles	Home field of the UCLA Bruins college football team as well as the annual Rose Bowl Game. It also hosted events from the 1932 and 1984 Summer Olympics
112	Royal Presidio Chapel	Royal Presidio Chapel	October 9, 1960 (#66000216)	Monterey; 36°35′45″N 121°53′25″W	Monterey	This cathedral is the oldest continuously operating parish, the oldest stone building in California, the smallest cathedral in the United States and one of the two oldest cathedrals in the United States. It is the only existing Presidio cathedral in California and the only original building in the Monterey Presidio.
113	San Diego Mission Church	San Diego Mission Church	April 15, 1970 (#70000144)	San Diego; 32°46′58″N 117°06′23″W	San Diego	This was the first Spanish Mission in Alta California and the start of El Camino Real. Originally located in the Presidio of San Diego, it later moved a few miles away. The nearby Old Mission Dam, also an NHL, provided water for milling and farming.
114	San Diego Presidio	San Diego Presidio	October 9, 1960 (#66000226)	San Diego; 32°45′31″N 117°11′36″W	San Diego	The first fortified presidio, it along with the first mission, San Diego Mission Church, paved the way for Spanish colonization of California. No structures remain, but the site is now located in Presidio Park.
115	San Francisco Bay Discovery Site	San Francisco Bay Discovery Site	May 23, 1968 (#68000022)	Pacifica; 37°36′11″N 122°27′17″W	San Mateo	On November 4, 1769 the expedition of Spanish explorer Gaspar de Portolá reached the summit of the 1,200-foot (370 m) high Sweeney Ridge, where he sighted San Francisco Bay. It is now part of the Golden Gate National Recreation Area.
116	San Francisco Cable Cars	San Francisco Cable Cars	January 29, 1964 (#66000233)	San Francisco; 37°47′44″N 122°24′27″W	San Francisco	An iconic image of San Francisco, this is the only remaining permanently operational manually operated cable car system in the world.
117^{†}	San Francisco Civic Center	San Francisco Civic Center	February 27, 1987 (#78000757)	San Francisco; 37°46′47″N 122°25′04″W	San Francisco	The United Nations Charter was signed here in 1945 as well as the post WWII peace treaty with Japan. This collection of Beaux Arts buildings serves a number of uses, including the Exposition Auditorium from the 1915 Panama-Pacific International Exposition.
118^{†}	San Francisco Port of Embarkation, U.S. Army	San Francisco Port of Embarkation, U.S. Army	February 4, 1985 (#85002433)	San Francisco; 37°48′26″N 122°25′50″W	San Francisco	Originally built during the American Civil War for coastal defense, this fort became the primary transportation hub in the Pacific for the United States during World War I and World War II. In World War II alone, over 1,647,174 passengers and 23,589,472 tons went through this fort. It is now part of the Golden Gate National Recreation Area
119^{†}	San Juan Bautista Plaza Historic District	San Juan Bautista Plaza Historic District	April 15, 1970 (#69000038)	San Juan Bautista; 36°50′37″N 121°32′04″W	San Benito	A prime example of the Spanish-Mexican colonial plan of buildings surrounding the central plaza and Mission church. The NHLD also includes the Jose Castro House, itself a National Historic Landmark. It was featured prominently in the Alfred Hitchcock film Vertigo.
120	San Luis Rey Mission Church	San Luis Rey Mission Church	April 15, 1970 (#70000142)	Oceanside; 33°13′56″N 117°19′11″W	San Diego	California's most pristine Spanish Mission Complex, this is the third church at this site.
121	Santa Barbara County Courthouse	Santa Barbara County Courthouse	April 5, 2005 (#81000177)	Santa Barbara; 34°25′28″N 119°42′09″W	Santa Barbara	Known for the beauty of its Spanish-Colonial Revival architecture, which inspired and influenced many other designers.
122	Santa Barbara Mission	Santa Barbara Mission	October 9, 1960 (#66000237)	Santa Barbara; 34°26′15″N 119°42′45″W	Santa Barbara	The only Spanish mission in California to remain under the leadership of the Franciscan Friars since the day of its founding.
123	Santa Cruz Looff Carousel and Roller Coaster	Santa Cruz Looff Carousel and Roller Coaster	February 27, 1987 (#87000764)	Santa Cruz; 36°57′52″N 122°01′00″W	Santa Cruz	The Looff family was one of the major early manufacturers of carousels, including this 1911 example. Only five other intact Looff carousels remain in the United States. The 1924 Giant Dipper roller coaster is the older of the two large, wooden scaffolded seaside roller coasters remaining on the West Coast.
124	Santa Monica Looff Hippodrome	Santa Monica Looff Hippodrome	February 27, 1987 (#87000766)	Santa Monica; 34°00′37″N 118°29′47″W	Los Angeles	Built by the Looff family to house one of their carousels, this structure now houses a different carousel, but remains a rare example of what was once a much larger amusement complex.
125	Upton Sinclair House	Upton Sinclair House	November 11, 1971 (#71000153)	Monrovia; 34°09′43″N 118°00′04″W	Los Angeles	Home of American novelist Upton Sinclair between 1942 and 1966 and where he wrote most of his later works.
126^{†}	Sonoma Plaza	Sonoma Plaza	December 19, 1960 (#75000489)	Sonoma; 38°17′04″N 122°27′27″W	Sonoma	The largest plaza in California, this was the location of the Bear Flag Revolt in 1846 which led to the Mexican–American War
127	Space Flight Operations Facility	Space Flight Operations Facility	October 3, 1985 (#85002814)	Pasadena; 34°11′58″N 118°10′25″W	Los Angeles	Control room at Jet Propulsion Laboratory where all NASA interplanetary and deep space missions are monitored.
128	Space Launch Complex 10	Space Launch Complex 10	June 23, 1986 (#86003511)	Vandenberg Air Force Base; 34°45′55″N 120°37′20″W	Santa Barbara	First built in 1958 to test missiles, it was used to launch space missions from 1963 to 1980. It is now a rare, well-preserved example of the equipment and facilities from that era.
129	Leland Stanford House	Leland Stanford House	May 28, 1987 (#71000178)	Sacramento; 38°34′36″N 121°29′52″W	Sacramento	The home of Leland Stanford, Governor of California from 1862 to 1863, U.S. Senator from 1885 to 1893, railroad tycoon, member of the Big Four and founder of Stanford University.
130	Star of India (bark)	Star of India (bark)	November 13, 1966 (#66000223)	San Diego; 32°42′51″N 117°10′22″W	San Diego	A seaworthy iron hulled museum ship in the San Diego Maritime Museum, she is the oldest ship that still sails regularly and the oldest iron hulled merchant ship still floating.
131	Steedman Estate (Casa del Herrero)	Steedman Estate (Casa del Herrero)	January 16, 2009 (#87000002)	Montecito; 34°26′07″N 119°38′08″W	Santa Barbara	Designed by architect George Washington Smith, this 11-acre, 1920s estate is considered one of the finest examples of Spanish Colonial Revival architecture in the United States.
132^{†}	Summit Camp		December 13, 2024 (#100011384)	Donner Pass Road; 39°18′55″N 120°19′25″W	Nevada and Placer	Archaeological remains of a 19th-century camp of Chinese workers building the nearby railroad.
133	Sutter's Fort	Sutter's Fort	January 20, 1961 (#66000221)	Sacramento; 38°34′14″N 121°28′12″W	Sacramento	A 19th century agricultural and trade colony, it was known for its connection to the Donner Party, the California Gold Rush, and the formation of Sacramento as well as its proximity to the California Trail and Siskiyou Trails. Now a state park, threatened with closure in 2008.
134	Swedenborgian Church	Swedenborgian Church	August 18, 2004 (#04001154)	San Francisco; 37°47′25″N 122°26′45″W	San Francisco	One of California's earliest pure Arts and Crafts buildings, this Swedenborgianism church remains open today with almost no architectural changes.
135	Tao House	Tao House	July 17, 1971 (#71000137)	Danville; 37°49′33″N 122°01′39″W	Contra Costa	America's only Nobel Prize-winning playwright Eugene O'Neill lived here from 1937 to 1944 while writing his final and most memorable plays: The Iceman Cometh, Long Day's Journey Into Night, and A Moon for the Misbegotten.
136^{†}	The Forty Acres	The Forty Acres	October 6, 2008 (#08001090)	Delano; 35°45′48″N 119°17′15″W	Kern	Served as the original headquarters of the United Farm Workers, the first permanent agricultural labor union in the United States.
137	Tor House (Robinson Jeffers House)	Tor House (Robinson Jeffers House)	December 13, 2024 (#100011386)	26304 Ocean View Ave. 36°32′31″N 121°55′56″W	Monterey	Longtime home of poet Robinson Jeffers (1887–1962), featuring a granite masonry house and 40-foot (12 m) tower he largely hand built beginning in 1919. Now a non-profit historic attraction known as Tor House and Hawk Tower.
138	Tule Lake Segregation Center	Tule Lake Segregation Center	February 17, 2006 (#06000210)	Newell; 41°53′08″N 121°22′26″W	Modoc	The largest Japanese American internment camp, it also had the highest security and stayed open longest, even after World War II. The Redress movement in the 1980s and pilgrimages to Tule Lake led to the Civil Liberties Act of 1988.
139	Twenty-Five-Foot Space Simulator	Twenty-Five-Foot Space Simulator	October 3, 1985 (#85002812)	Pasadena; 34°12′03″N 118°10′22″W	Los Angeles	An 85 foot high stainless-steel cylinder at the Jet Propulsion Laboratory used for testing spacecraft in space-like conditions. Ranger, Surveyor, Mariner, and Voyager spacecraft were all tested in this facility.
140	Unitary Plan Wind Tunnel	Unitary Plan Wind Tunnel	October 3, 1985 (#85002799)	Moffett Field; 37°24′56″N 122°03′35″W	Santa Clara	This wind tunnel built in the 1950s allowed commercial and military aircraft as well as the Space Shuttle to be aerodynamically tested.
141	United States Immigration Station, Angel Island	United States Immigration Station, Angel Island	December 9, 1997 (#71000164)	Tiburon; 37°51′44″N 122°25′13″W	Marin	The "Ellis Island of the West" processed over 1 million Asian immigrants between 1910 and 1940. Now part of Angel Island State Park, it was renovated in 2009.
142	United States Post Office and Court House (Court House for the Central District of California)	United States Post Office and Court House (Court House for the Central District of California)	October 16, 2012 (#06000001)	Los Angeles; 34°03′18″N 118°14′33″W	Los Angeles	Courthouse built in 1940, reflecting Art Moderne architecture.
143	United States Post Office and Court House (James R. Browning U.S. Court of Appeals)	United States Post Office and Court House (James R. Browning U.S. Court of Appeals)	October 16, 2012 (#71000188)	San Francisco; 37°46′46″N 122°24′40″W	San Francisco	Courthouse built in 1905, reflecting the Beaux Arts classicism used in several early twentieth-century federal buildings.
144	Walker Pass	Walker Pass	July 4, 1961 (#66000210)	Onyx; 35°39′47″N 118°01′37″W	Kern	Joseph Reddeford Walker mapped this pass in 1834 after learning of it from Native Americans. He then led the first immigrant wagon train through it in 1846. This pass significantly contributed to the development of California.
145	Warner's Ranch	Warner's Ranch	January 20, 1961 (#66000228)	Warner Springs; 33°14′19″N 116°39′03″W	San Diego	The only trading post between New Mexico and Los Angeles, this ranch developed into a stop on the Butterfield Overland Mail stagecoach line along with nearby Oak Grove. Now a hot springs resort.
146	Watts Towers	Watts Towers	December 14, 1990 (#77000297)	Los Angeles; 33°56′13″N 118°14′26″W	Los Angeles	These towers built by Simon Rodia are a superb example of non-traditional vernacular architecture and American Naïve art.
147	Wawona Hotel and Thomas Hill Studio	Wawona Hotel and Thomas Hill Studio	May 28, 1987 (#75000223)	Yosemite National Park; 37°32′11″N 119°39′13″W	Mariposa	Built in 1879 for tourists visiting the Mariposa Grove, this hotel is also where the Hudson River School painter Thomas Hill painted towards the end of his life.
148	Wayfarers Chapel	Wayfarers Chapel	December 11, 2023 (#100009801)	5755 Palos Verdes Dr. S 33°44′41″N 118°22′33″W	Los Angeles	Designed by Lloyd Wright, this church is well-preserved example of post-World War II Modern ecclesiastical architecture and landscaping.
149	Well No. 4, Pico Canyon Oil Field	Well No. 4, Pico Canyon Oil Field	November 13, 1966 (#66000212)	Stevenson Ranch; 34°22′10″N 118°37′49″W	Los Angeles	Drilled in 1876 to 376 feet (115 m), this was the first commercially successful oil well in California, producing 25 barrels a day (4 m^{3}/d).
150	Yuma Crossing and Associated Sites	Yuma Crossing and Associated Sites	November 13, 1966 (#66000197)	Winterhaven; 32°43′45″N 114°36′55″W	Imperial	A major crossroads for Alta California as well as the Westward expansion of the United States. It has several archaeological and historical sites, shared with Arizona across the Colorado River, including Fort Yuma and other state parks.

== Former NHLs ==
In addition, there are four sites that were once National Historic Landmarks in California but are not currently.

	Landmark name	Image	Date designated	Date moved or withdrawn	Location	Description
1	First Pacific Coast Salmon Cannery Site		April 6, 1964	July 14, 2004	Broderick, Yolo County; 38°34′51″N 121°30′26″W	The first Pacific Coast salmon cannery was established on this site in 1864. However, nothing of the original operation remains, and numerous floods and the establishment of a city park on the former site altered the riverbank's appearance to such a degree that the NHL designation was withdrawn in 2004.
2	Fort Ross Chapel	Photograph of the reconstruction of the Fort Ross Chapel, a wooden walled and roofed building with an evergreen-covered hillside behind.	1969	1971	Fort Ross, Sonoma County	The chapel at Fort Ross, a rare example of a log church constructed on a Russian quadrilateral plan, was withdrawn from the NHL listings after a fire destroyed most of the building in 1970. A complete reconstruction of the chapel now stands in its place.
3	Rock Magnetics Laboratory		October 12, 1994	March 8, 1999	Menlo Park, San Mateo County	Located at the United States Geological Survey's Menlo Park offices, this is the site where Richard Doell, Allan V. Cox, and Brent Dalrymple researched major discoveries in areas related to geomagnetic reversals and plate tectonics. However, the lab was built in a temporary building, which was demolished in the late 1990s.
4	Wapama (steam schooner)		April 20, 1984	February 27, 2015	San Francisco	This 204' wooden schooner was the last surviving of 200 ships of its type plying the lumber trade along the Pacific coast. It was scrapped in 2013.

== See also ==
- Bibliography of California history
- California Point of Historical Interest
- California Register of Historical Resources
- Historic preservation
- History of California
- List of California Historical Landmarks
- List of California State Historic Parks
- List of National Natural Landmarks in California
- National Register of Historic Places listings in California
- National Register of Historic Places
