= George A. Strout House =

Historic house in California, United States

- U.S. National Register of Historic Places
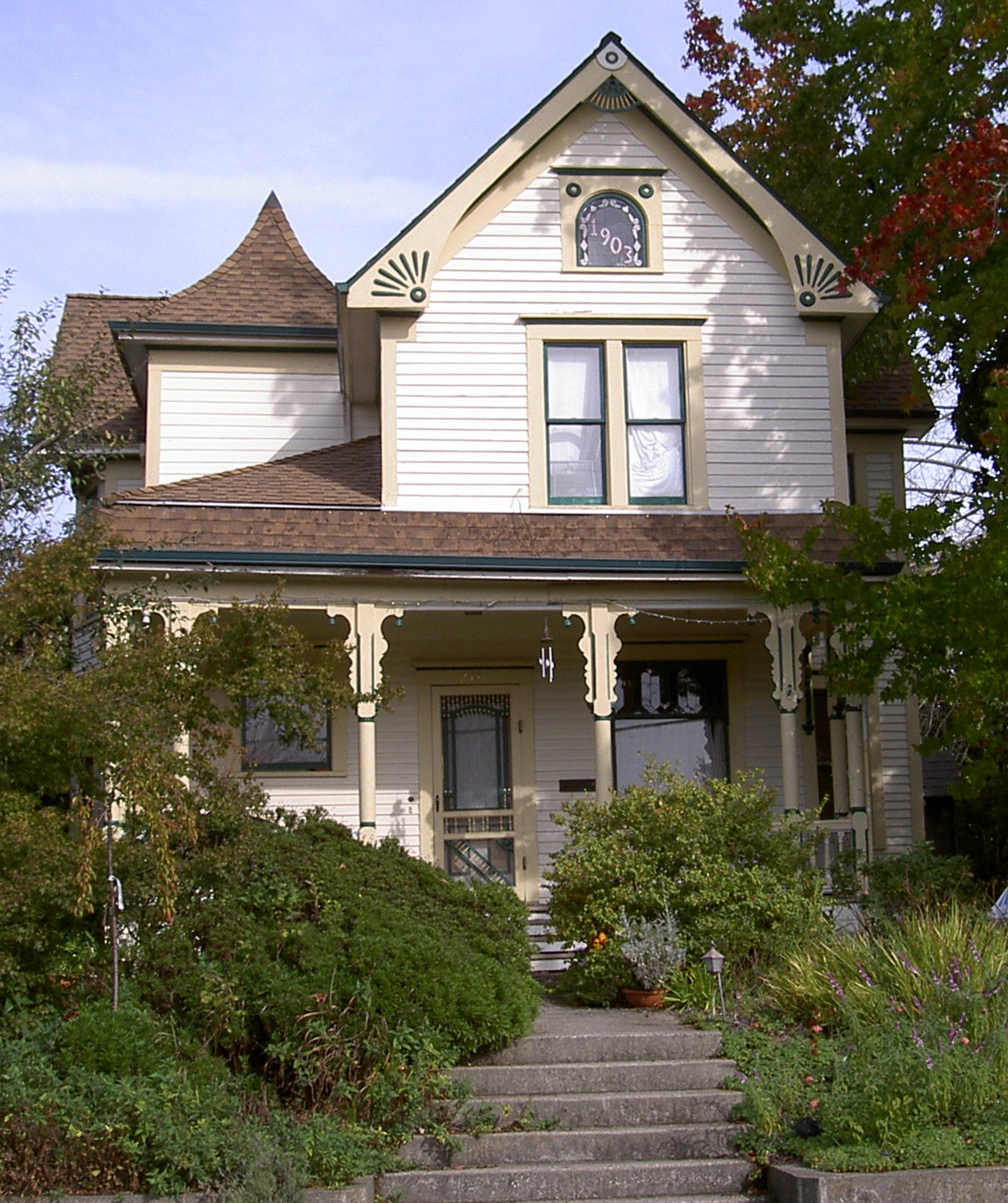

- Location within California Location within the United States
- Location: Sebastopol, California
- Coordinates: 38°24′9.5″N 122°49′45″W
- Area: 0.2 acres (0.081 ha)
- Built: 1903
- Architects: Strout, George Allen
- Architectural style: Queen Anne
- NRHP reference No.: 80000870
- Added to NRHP: June 17, 1980

The George A. Strout House is a registered historic place in Sebastopol, California. The house received a Preservation Award from the Western Sonoma County Historical Society in 1977.

It was placed on the National Register of Historic Places in 1980. It has also been known as the Strout House and the Kimball House.

George Strout, one of Sebastopol's early mayors, bought a lot at 253 Florence Avenue from Gertrude Huntley in 1901 and built a Queen Anne Victorian for his family in 1903. Strout, a master carpenter, founded Sebastopol's first planing mill, the Strout Planing Mill, which supplied all of the materials and millwork for his home. Strout was known for his staircases; he also produced ladders, bee hives and fruit dryer trays. He built several houses in Sebastopol during his career, but the Strout House is the only one on the National Register of Historic Places. The Strout House is notable for the excellence of its formal Queen Anne design, the craftsmanship of Sebastopol's carpenter/builders, and the quality of the Strout millwork.

The home was in the Strout family until the 1970s and has had a variety of owners since. It was the site of a bed and breakfast for a time, but later was again a private residence.
