= Geyserville Union School =

- U.S. National Register of Historic Places
- Location within California Location within the United States
- Location: Main St., Geyserville, California
- Coordinates: 38°42′28″N 122°54′23″W
- Area: 1.6 acres (0.65 ha)
- Built: 1921
- Architects: Smith, Henry C.
- Architectural style: Mission/spanish Revival
- NRHP reference No.: 79000558
- Added to NRHP: October 24, 1979

The Geyserville Union School on Main St. in Geyserville, California was built in 1921. It was a work of Henry C. Smith. It was listed on the National Register of Historic Places in 1979.

== History ==
Geyserville Union School stemmed out of Geyserville High School, which in 1881, taught students in a shed on Geyserville Avenue. Students were then moved to the Union School. Middle and high schoolers moved to newer schools in the area by 1972, leaving only elementary school attendees at Union. The school mascot was the mustang horse.
