= California Historical Landmarks in Sonoma County =

This is a list of the properties and districts listed as California Historical Landmarks within Sonoma County, California.

- Note: Click the "Map of all coordinates" link to the right to view a Google map of all properties and districts with latitude and longitude coordinates in the table below.

== Listings ==
Image		Landmark name	Location	City or town	Summary
Bear Flag Monument	7	Bear Flag Monument	Sonoma Plaza; 38°17′36″N 122°27′24″W	Sonoma	
Blue Wing Inn	17	Blue Wing Inn	Sonoma State Historic Park; 38°17′36″N 122°27′20″W	Sonoma	
Bodega Bay & Harbor	833	Bodega Bay & Harbor	Doran Park; 38°19′25″N 123°02′52″W	Bodega Bay	
Buena Vista Winery	392	Buena Vista Winery	18000 Old Winery Rd. 38°17′58″N 122°25′23″W	Sonoma	Also on the NRHP list as NPS-86001902
Cooper's Sawmill	835	Cooper's Sawmill	Mirabel and River Rds. 38°29′36″N 122°53′45″W	Santa Rosa	
Cotati Downtown Plaza	879	Cotati Downtown Plaza	Downtown plaza 38°19′36″N 122°42′22″W	Cotati	
Fort Ross	5	Fort Ross	Fort Ross State Historic Park, 19005 Coast Hwy; 38°30′51″N 123°14′34″W	Jenner	
Haraszthy Villa	392-1	Haraszthy Villa	Castle Rd. near Buena Vista Winery; 38°18′02″N 122°25′32″W	Sonoma	
Icaria-Speranza Commune	981	Icaria-Speranza Commune	W side of Asti Rd. 38°46′27″N 122°59′59″W	Cloverdale	
Italian Swiss Colony	621	Italian Swiss Colony	38°45′46″N 122°58′26″W	Asti	
Jack London State Historic Park	743	Jack London State Historic Park	Jack London State Historic Park; 38°21′02″N 122°32′35″W	Glen Ellen	Also on the NRHP list as NPS-66000240
Upload Photo	939	John Medica Gardens	5000 Medica Rd. 35°34′04″N 121°05′51″W	Santa Rosa	Twentieth Century Folk Art
Luther Burbank Home and Gardens	234	Luther Burbank Home and Gardens	200 Santa Rosa Ave. 38°26′10″N 122°42′42″W	Santa Rosa	Also on the NRHP list as NPS-66000241
Mission San Francisco de Solano	3	Mission San Francisco de Solano	Sonoma State Historic Park; 38°17′38″N 122°27′21″W	Sonoma	
Nash-Patton Adobe	667	Nash-Patton Adobe	579 1st St. E. 38°17′25″N 122°27′25″W	Sonoma	
Petrified Forest	915	Petrified Forest	4100 Petrified Forest Rd. 38°33′20″N 122°38′20″W	Calistoga	
Presidio of Sonoma	316	Presidio of Sonoma	Sonoma State Historic Park; 38°17′37″N 122°27′24″W	Sonoma	
Rancho Petaluma Adobe	18	Rancho Petaluma Adobe	Petaluma Adobe State Historic Park, 3325 Adobe Rd. 38°15′20″N 122°35′04″W	Petaluma	Also on the NRHP list as NPS-70000151
Saint Teresa of Avila Church, Bodega	820	Saint Teresa of Avila Church, Bodega	Bodega Hwy near Bodega Ln. 38°20′46″N 122°58′21″W	Bodega	
Salvador Vallejo Adobe	501	Salvador Vallejo Adobe	421 1st St. 38°17′37″N 122°27′32″W	Sonoma	Built in 1846 home of Captain Salvador Vallejo
Sebastiani Vineyards and Winery	739	Sebastiani Vineyards and Winery	394 4th St E 38°17′36″N 122°26′58″W	Sonoma	
Swiss Hotel	496	Swiss Hotel	18 W. Spain St. 38°17′38″N 122°27′29″W	Sonoma	
Temelec Hall	237	Temelec Hall	220 Temelec Circle; 38°16′00″N 122°29′34″W	Temelec	
Union Hotel & Union Hall	627	Union Hotel & Union Hall	35 Napa and 1st St. 38°17′31″N 122°27′31″W	Sonoma	
Vallejo Estate	4	Vallejo Estate	Corner of Spain and West 3rd Streets; 38°17′50″N 122°27′40″W	Sonoma	Also on the NRHP list as NPS-72000262
Walters Ranch Hop Kiln	893	Walters Ranch Hop Kiln	7501 Sonoma Hwy. 38°32′10″N 122°52′04″W	Healdsburg	
William Hood House	692	William Hood House	7501 Sonoma Hwy. 38°26′37″N 122°34′36″W	Santa Rosa	Also on the NRHP list as NPS-97001658

== See also ==
- List of California Historical Landmarks
- National Register of Historic Places listings in Sonoma County, California
