= Medica =

Medica may refer to:

- MEDICA Group, a French company
- MEDICA Trade Fair
- Eduardo Medica, Argentinian tennis player
- Jack Medica, American swimmer
- John Medica, American sculptor and gardener
- Tommy Medica, American baseball player

== See also ==
- Medyka, a village in Poland
