= Union Hotel (Sonoma, California) =

Historical place in Sonoma County, United States

Union Hotel and Union Hall Site
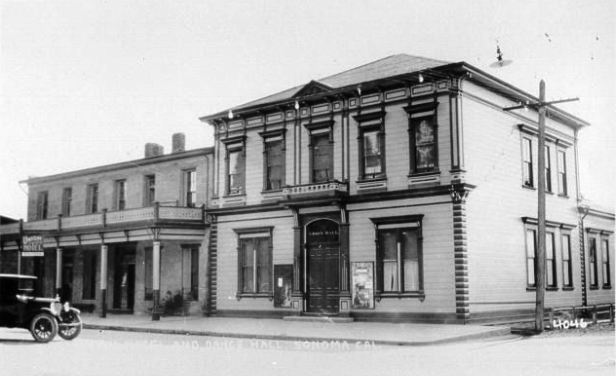
- Union Hotel in 1923 (second building)

- Location within California Location within the United States
- 38.291855°N 122.458747°W
- Location: 35 Napa Street, Sonoma, California

History
- Built: 1850, 176 years ago

Site notes
- Architects: Adobe 1850 building; Stone 1866 building

California Historical Landmark
- Designated: January 13, 1958
- Reference no.: 627

Union Hotel and Union Hall Site is historical site of buildings built in 1850, in Sonoma, California in Sonoma County, California. The Union Hotel and Union Hall Site is a California Historical Landmark No. 627 listed on January 13, 1958. The original Union Hotel was a one-story adobe built by three veterans of the Mexican–American War. Next to the Union Hotel was built the Union Hall. The two buildings were lost in 1866 fire. The Union Hotel was rebuilt into a two-story stone hotel. The hotel was on the second floor and a hall was on the first floor. The Union Hotel and Union Hall were on the south side of the Sonoma Plaza.

The Union Hotel was a social center of the town. United States Army soldiers such as William Tecumseh Sherman, Joseph Hooker, George Stoneman, and George Derby used the hall as gathering space. The hall also used as a theatre for plays, social, musical, and political events. The Union Hotel closed in 1955 and was sold to Bank of America, which removed the building for a new bank branch. The Union Hotel was at 35 Napa Street in Sonoma.

A California historical marker is at 35 Napa Street in Sonoma, a bank parking lot with a flag poles. The historical marker for the Union Hotel and Union Hall Site, was placed there by the California Department of Parks & Recreation in working with the Sonoma Branch of Bank of America in 1982.

== See also ==
- California Historical Landmarks in Sonoma County
