= Swiss Hotel =

Historical place in Sonoma County, United States

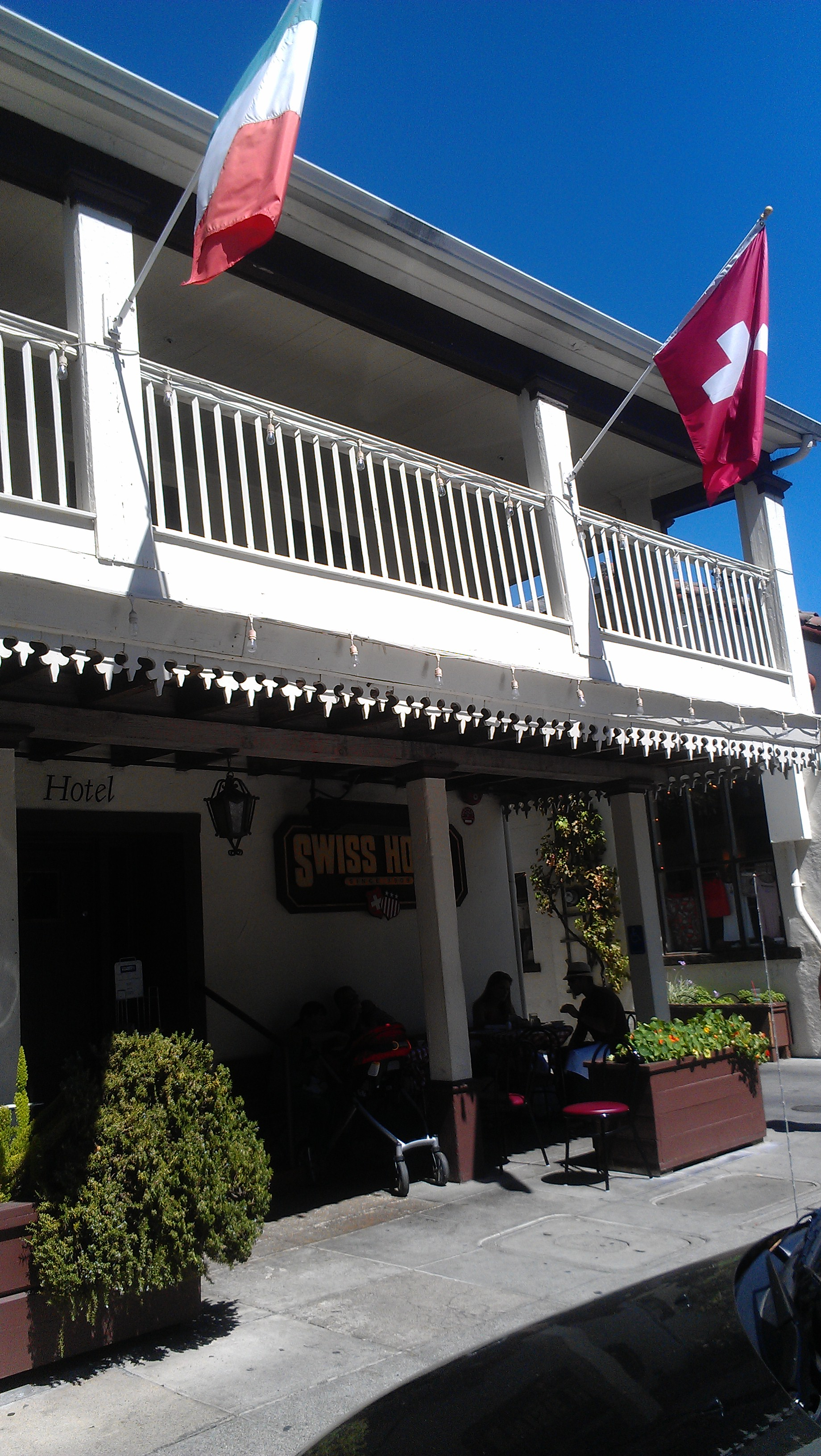
- Swiss Hotel in Sonoma

- Location within California Location within the United States
- 38.2938°N 122.458008°W
- Location: 18 West Spain Street, Sonoma, California

History
- Built: 1850, 176 years ago

Site notes
- Architect: Don Salvador Vallejo
- Architectural style: Adobe
- Governing body: Swiss Hotel

California Historical Landmark
- Designated: October 17, 1951
- Reference no.: 496

Swiss Hotel is historical building built in 1850, in Sonoma, California in Sonoma County, California. The Swiss Hotel is a California Historical Landmark No. 496 listed on October 17, 1951. Swiss Hotel was built by Don Salvador Vallejo, brother of Mexican General Mariano Guadalupe Vallejo. Don Salvador Vallejo built next to the Swiss Hotel his house, Salvador Vallejo Adobe, in 1836. The Swiss Hotel has been sold number of time. In the 1870s the hotel was a stagecoach stop. The hotel was sold in 1892 to the Toroni family, which ran the Ticino Hotel. Ticino Hotel had guest from the nearyby railroad station and its employees. The original Ticino Hotel, west side of the Plaza, was lost in a fire.

In 1923 the hotel was sold to Mose Mastelotto, then inherited by his daughter, Antonetta and her husband Henry Marioni in 1929. In 1945, Marioni daughter, Helen, and her husband Ted Dunlap inherited the Hotel running it until 1991. In 1991 their nephew Hank Marioni remodeled and updated the old building, still in the family. The hotel and restaurant are at 18 West Spain Street, Sonoma. In 1861, it was sold to Dr. Victor J. Faure, of the Vallejo family vineyards. At its peak the Vallejo vineyard had more than 18,000 vines. Vallejo vineyard was the first commercial vineyard in Sonoma County. The Swiss Hotel is near the Sonoma State Historic Park and across the street from the Sonoma Plaza.

A historical marker is at Swiss Hotel, placed by the California State Park Commission.

== Gallery ==
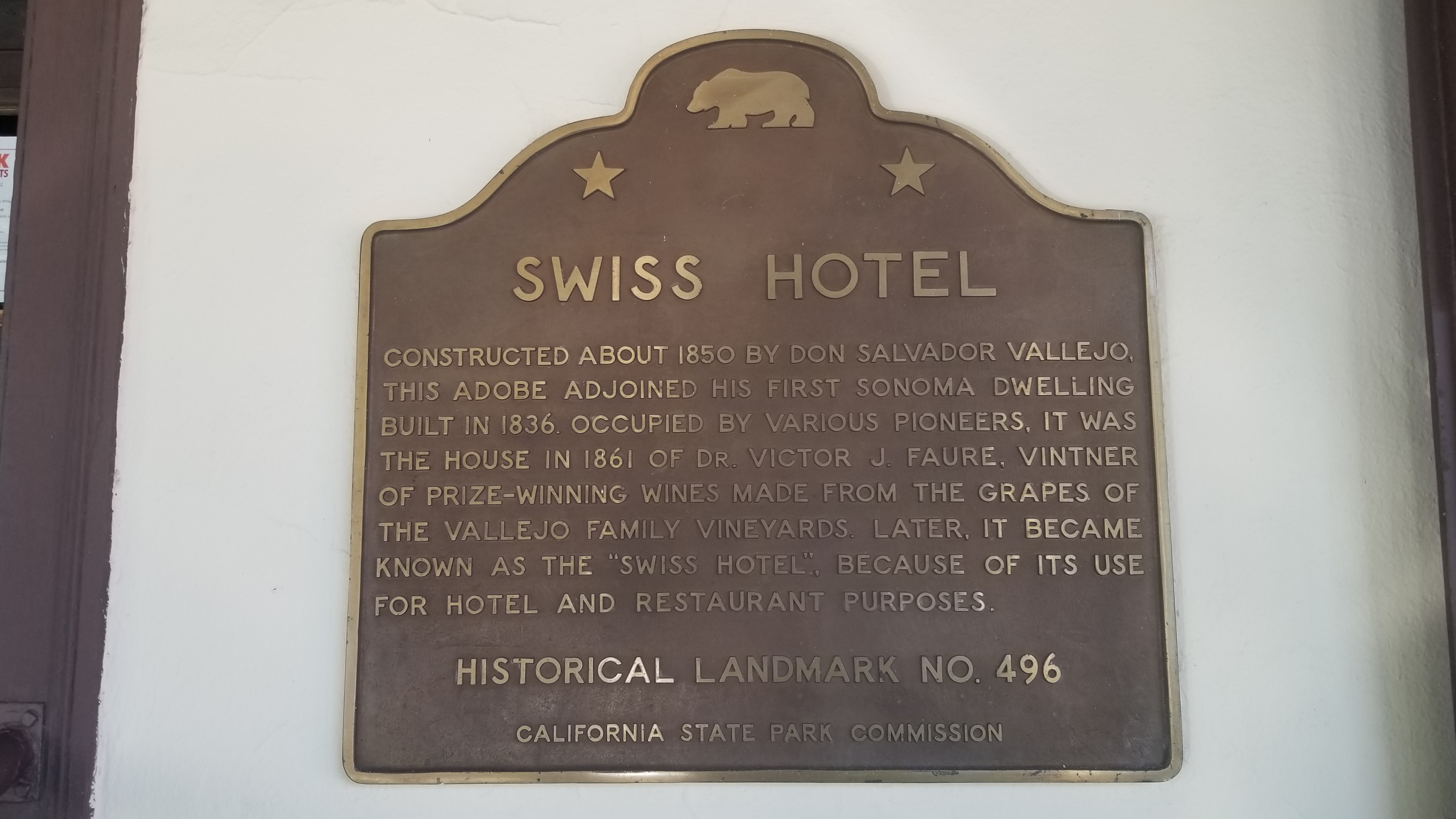
Marker

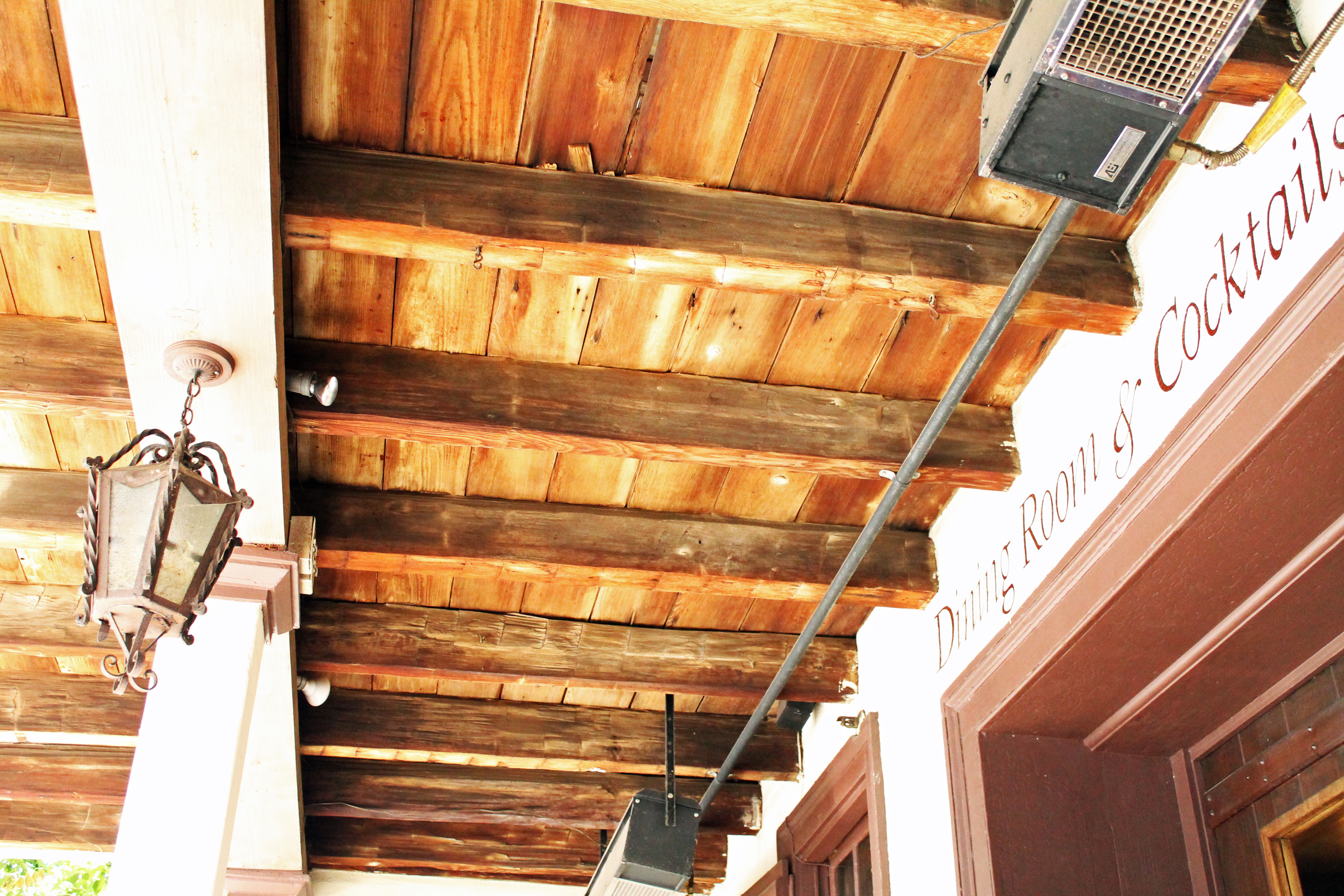
Wood work

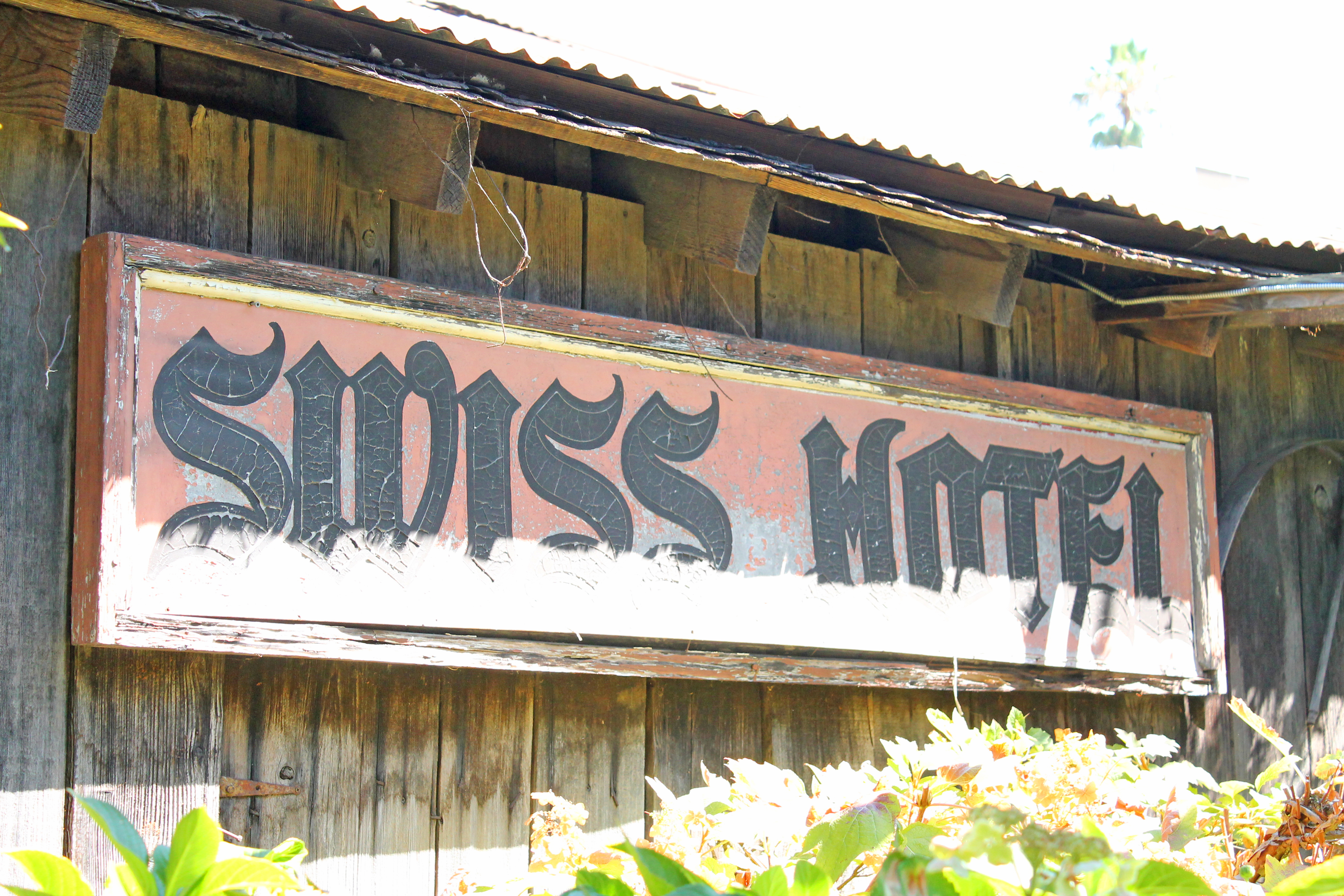
Sign

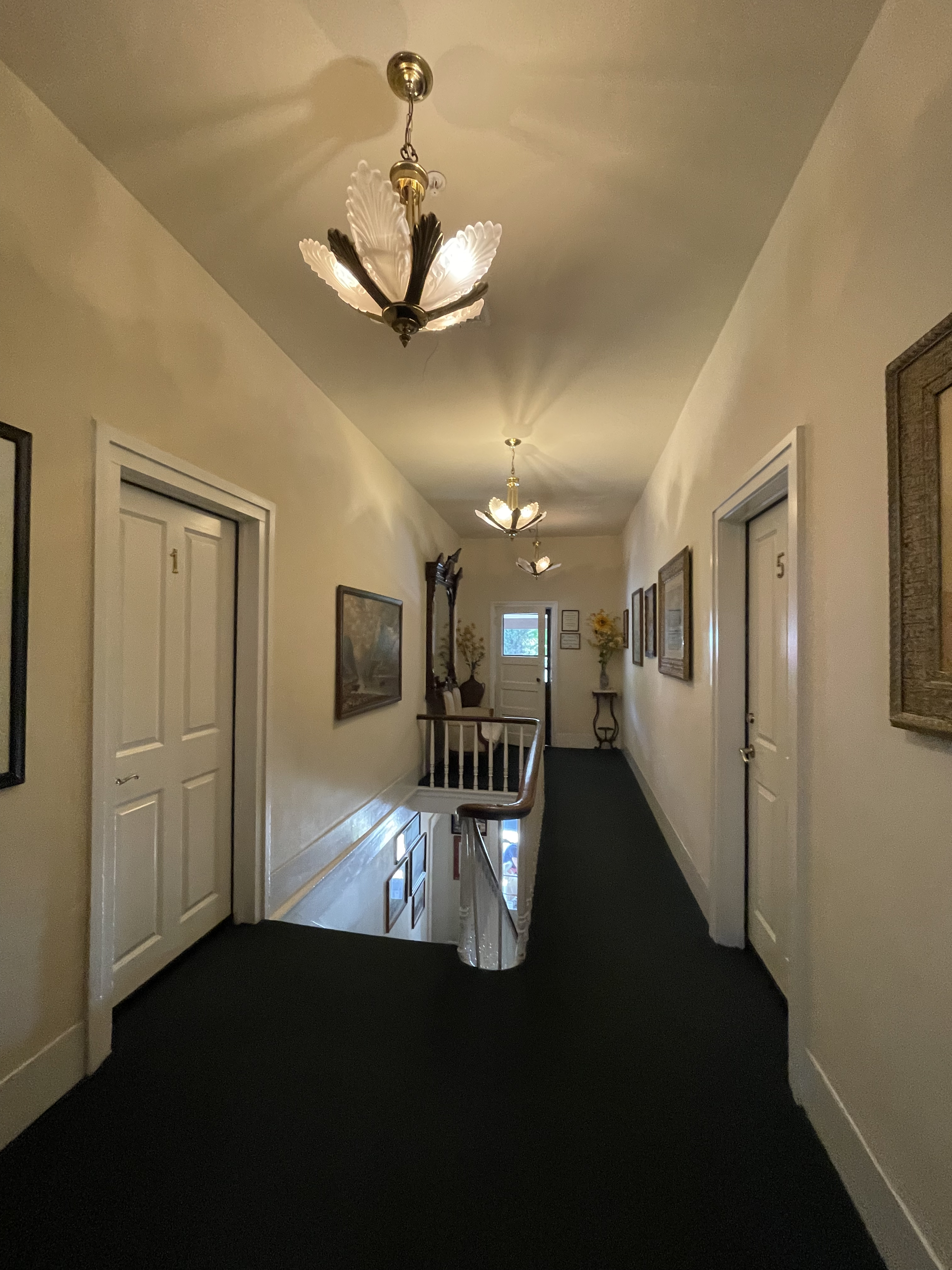
Inside

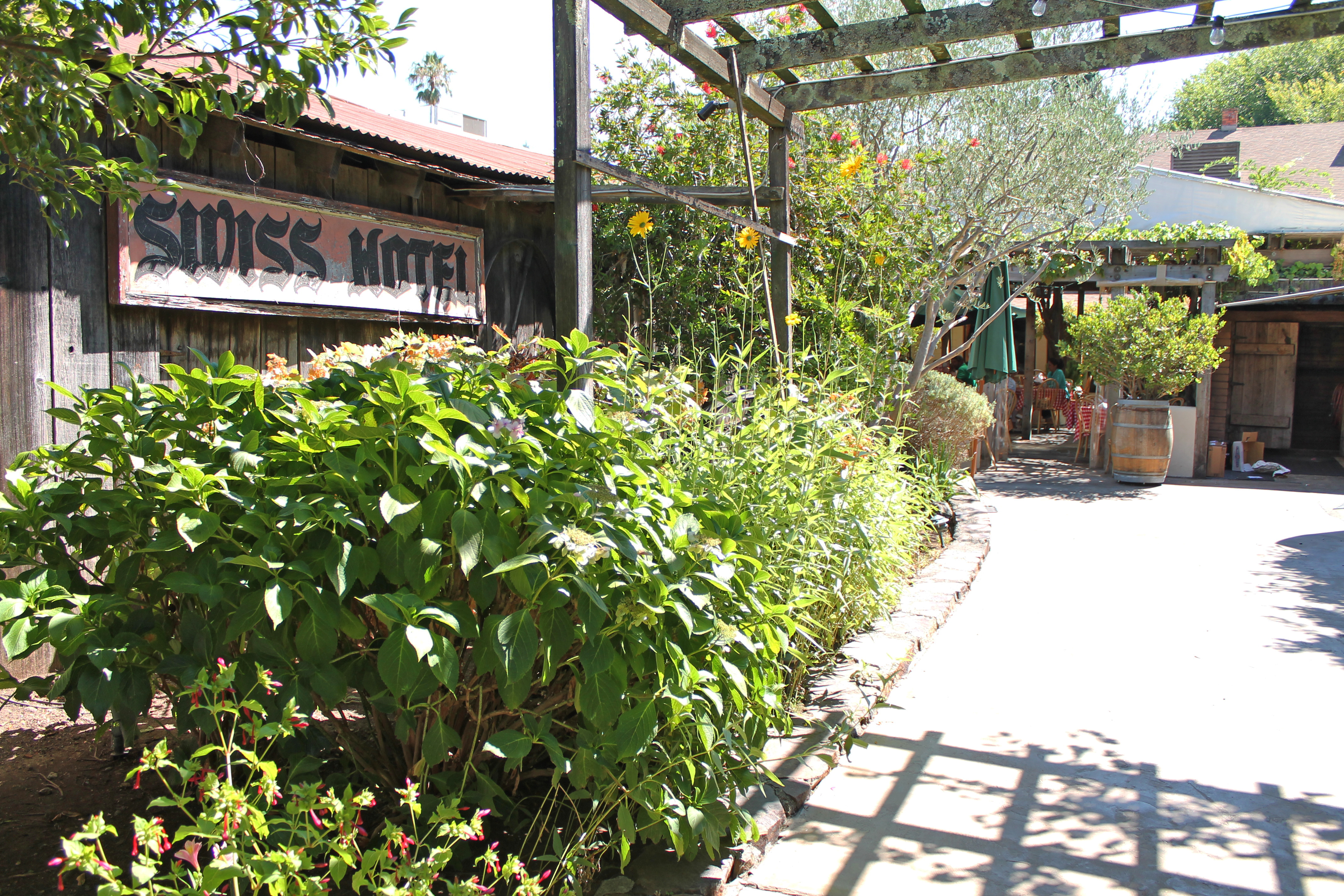
Walkway

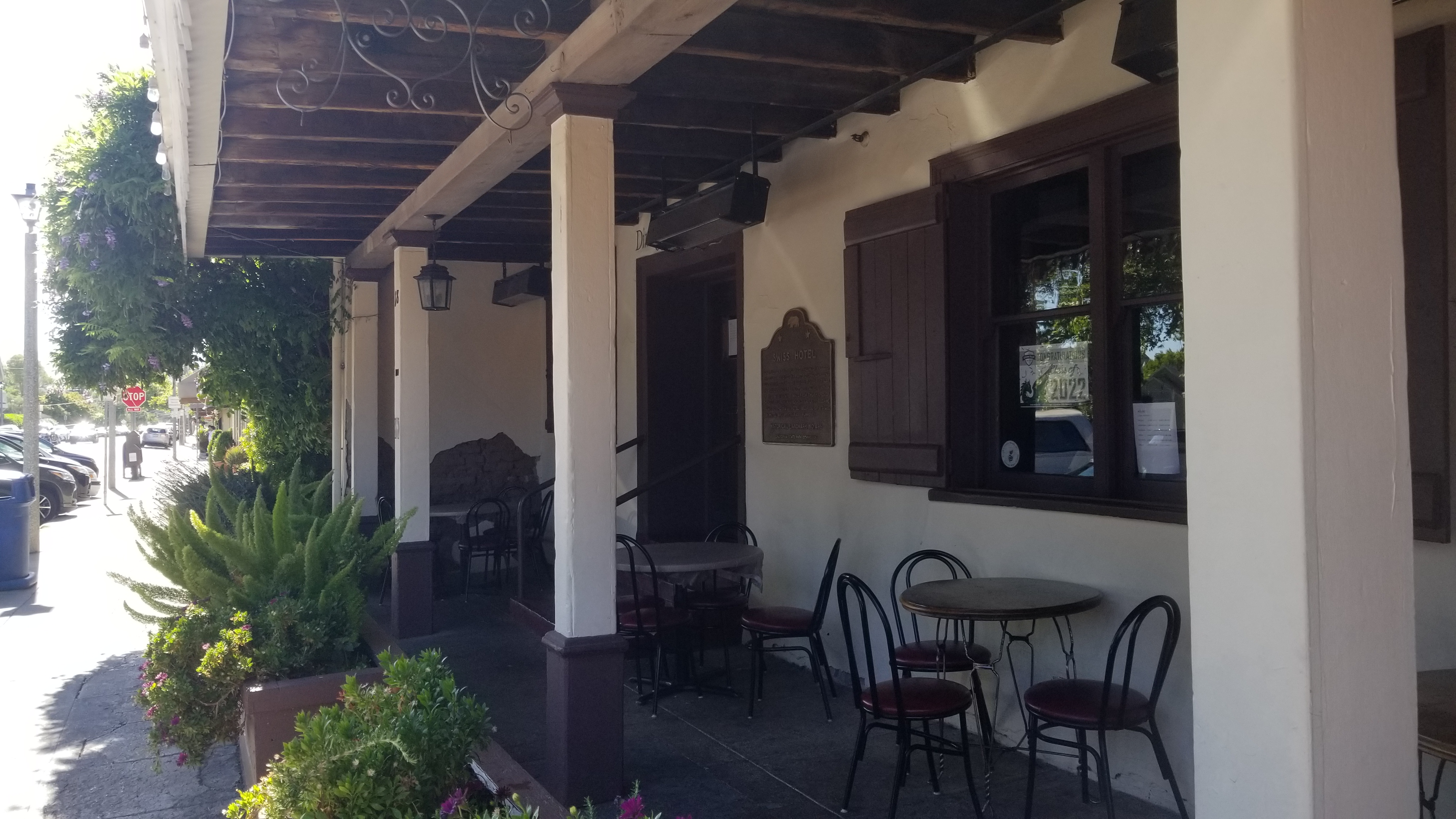
Fornt

== See also ==
- California Historical Landmarks in Sonoma County
- Vallejo Estate
- Buena Vista Winery
- Mission San Francisco Solano
