= Nash-Patton Adobe =

19th century adobe residence in California

Coordinates: 38°17′25.69″N 122°27′24.91″W

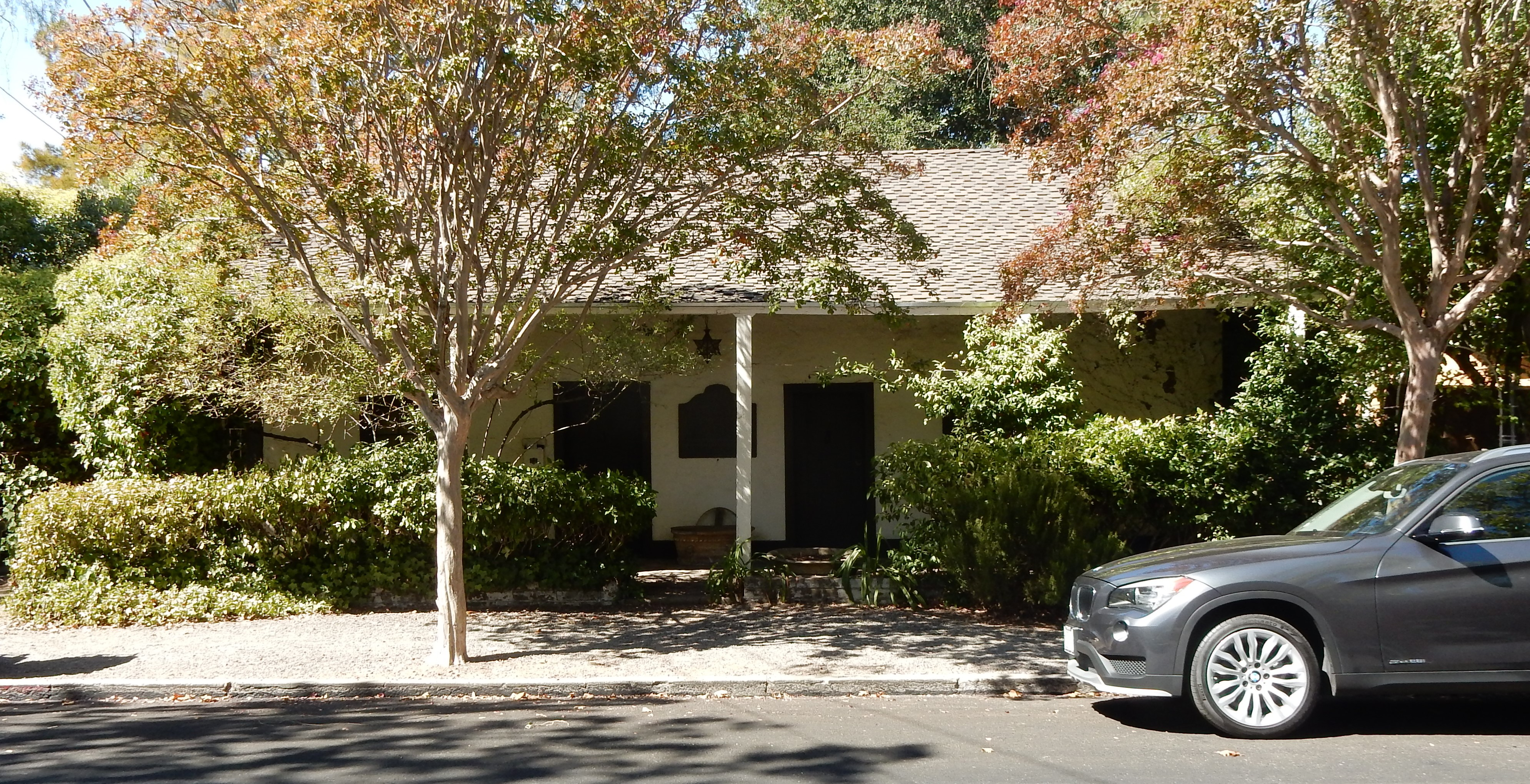
- Interactive map of Nash-Patton Adobe
- Location: Sonoma, Sonoma County

California Historical Landmark
- Official name: Nash Adobe
- Designated: November 5, 1958
- Reference no.: 667

The Nash-Patton Adobe (also called the Nash Adobe) is a historic house located in Sonoma, California in the United States. The home is listed as a California Historical Landmark.

== History ==
The house was in built in 1847 by Henry A. Green. The property was owned by John H. Nash. That same year, in July, William T. Sherman arrested John H. Nash at the house. Nash was the magistrate of Sonoma during the Bear Flag Revolt, and he refused to step down to allow Lilburn W. Boggs to take over. Sherman took Nash to Monterey to face military governor Colonel Richard B. Mason. After Mason explained the military governor's absolute authority to appoint and remove an alcalde until California achieved its own civilian government. Nash gave up his defiance of Mason's appointment and returned peacefully to Sonoma.

By 1848, the Lewis and Nancy Patton Adler were living in the adobe. Nancy Adler was a survivor of the Donner Party. By 1866, a butcher lived in the house. The attic was used for curing meats. It was restored by Nancy Adler's great-granddaughter, Zolita Bates, in 1931.

The adobe was added to the California Historical Landmarks list on November 5, 1958.

In January, 2011, the house was raided for "suspicion of operating a methamphetamine lab". Two months later the house was listed on the real estate market for $1.2 million. It was the second time the house was for sale in the past 100 years.

The house was sold in October 2013. It was renovated and enlarged in a four-year process that was completed in 2025, serving as a hospitality space for events of the owner’s winery and a guest retreat for extended family members of the owner. The adobe house is 1000 square feet. It has four rooms. The back of the house has a porch with a lean-to.
