= Salvador Vallejo Adobe =

Historic building in Sonoma, California

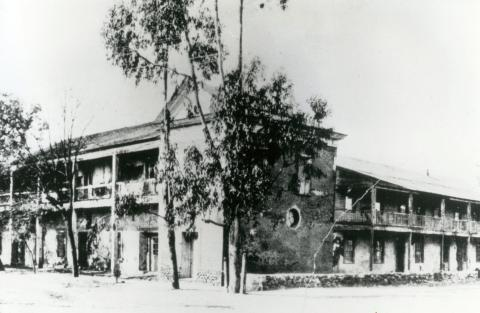
- Salvador Vallejo Adobe

- Location within California Location within the United States
- 38°17′36.3″N 122°27′32.12″W
- Type: House
- Location: Sonoma County

History
- Built: 1836
- Built for: Salvador Vallejo; María de Carrillo Vallejo

California Historical Landmark
- Official name: Salvador Vallejo Adobe
- Designated: December 16, 1952
- Reference no.: 501

The Salvador Vallejo Adobe is a historic building located in Sonoma, California in the United States. The building is a California Historic Landmark.

== History ==
The home was originally built by "Indian laborers" for Salvador and María de Carrillo Vallejo. The home was built circa 1836. Carrillo Vallejo decorated interior with imported furniture, embroidery (made by Indian servants), engravings, and Catholic art. Edwin Bryant described the parlor as being decorated with "handsome chairs, sofas, mirrors and tables of mahogany frame work and a fine piano, the first I have seen in the country." The house was considered very luxurious at the time. When the Bear Flag Revolt took place, the insurgents occupied the house. Saldavor Vallejo was captured and held at Sutter's Fort. After the revolt, the Vallejo's struggled to reclaim their property. The family decided to move to Napa, California.

After the Vallejo's moved to Napa, the adobe was used as barracks for American soldiers. It then became a Presbyterian co-ed boarding school called Cumberland College from 1858 until 1864. In February 1867, the main wing of the house was destroyed in a fire. The structure that remains today are the former servant quarters.

The building was owned by the Aguillon family. However, by June 1952, John West owned the adobe. West and his wife lived in San Francisco and used the property as a weekend home. The structure was named a California Historic Landmark on December 16, 1952. A Mrs. Albert Magnum also lived in an apartment on the property in 1952.

The building has served as a retail establishment, a Masonic temple, a post office, and a courthouse. Today, the building houses a restaurant, a retail shop, and an upstairs residence.

== Architecture ==
The adobe structure is located on the westside of the historic Sonoma Plaza.

In 1951, then owner John West hired a carpenter to add build a balcony over the sidewalk. The balcony, which remains today, extends from the north to south side of the building facing the Sonoma Plaza. They also installed window shelving, tile flooring, fluorescent lights, and redwood siding on the walls.

The West's also installed a large garden on the west side of the property. It included a redwood shrine to the Virgin Mary. Today, it serves as an al fresco dining area for the Sonoma Caffé restaurant.

A large plaque designating it a California Historic Landmark is adhered to the front of the building.
