= MEDICA Group =

French private health group

MEDICA S.A
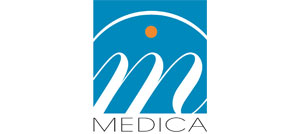
- Type: Société Anonyme (S.A)
- Traded as: NYSE Euronext Paris
- Founded: 1968
- Headquarters: 39 rue du Gouverneur Félix Eboué, 92130 Issy-les-Moulineaux, France
- Key people: Jacques Bailet, Christine Jeandel
- Services: Assisted living, Hospital
- Revenue: ▲€538,9 million (+12% / 2010)
- Number of employees: 6800
- Website: www.groupemedica.com/en

MEDICA is a French private health group operating care facilities for dependent persons.

== Activities ==
The MEDICA group operates in the sector of nursing homes for elderly dependent persons, in France and Italy, and in the health sector, with medical units of follow-up care and rehabilitation as well as psychiatric clinics. In these two sectors, the MEDICA Group had a total capacity of approximately 13800 beds as of 11 February 2011.

== History ==
- 1968: Pierre Burel founds MEDICA by opening its first retirement home.
- 1970-1990: Construction and acquisition in France of 23 facilities. (mainly nursing homes and follow-up care facilities).
- 1999: MEDICA is acquired by the Société Centrale Immobilier de la Caisse des Dépôts (SCIC), a subsidiary of the Caisse des dépôts et consignations/Caisse des dépôts (Fund Deposit establishment). The overall capacity of the MEDICA group then stands at nearly 2,500 beds. Jacques Bailet is appointed CEO of the MEDICA Group. Christine Jeandel is appointed Chief Operating Officer.
- 2003: Several investment funds managed by Bridgepoint Capital and AlpInvest Partners acquire the MEDICA Group. Acquisition of the group Doyennés Europe. By December 31, 2003, MEDICA reports a consolidated turnover of 209.9 million euros for a capacity of 7225 beds. Creation of a MEDICA training center: the Institute of Good Practices.
- 2005: MEDICA expands its international strategy, and enters the Italian market.
- 2006: Several investment funds advised by BC Partners, take control of the capital. By December 31, 2006, MEDICA has a capacity of 9 643 beds.
- 2008: The MEDICA group has 144 operating facilities for a total capacity of 11,042 beds. By December 31, 2008, MEDICA reports 448.8 million euros in turnover.
- 2009: The capacity of the group is 11 381 beds.
- 2010: The company is listed on the NYSE Euronext Paris (compartment B), eligible for SRD.
- 2011: The MEDICA group receives the NF service certification given by AFNOR for the majority of its nursing homes.
- 2014: the combined general meetings of shareholders of Korian (1,345 million euros in revenue in 2012) and Medica (901 million in revenue in 2012) approved the merger-absorption of Medica by Korian.

== Key numbers ==
- Turnover in 2010: 538.9 million euros (€).
- Beds in operation: 13 800 beds
- Number of employees and experienced health professionals: 6800

== Management ==
Members of senior management:

- Jacques Bailet, President and CEO
- Christine Jeandel, COO

Members of the management team :

- Mathieu Fabre, CFO
- Alexandra Devic, Human Resources Director
- Dr. Didier Armaingaud, Medical Director
