= Sonoma Plaza =

Plaza and historic district in California

- U.S. National Register of Historic Places
- U.S. National Historic Landmark District
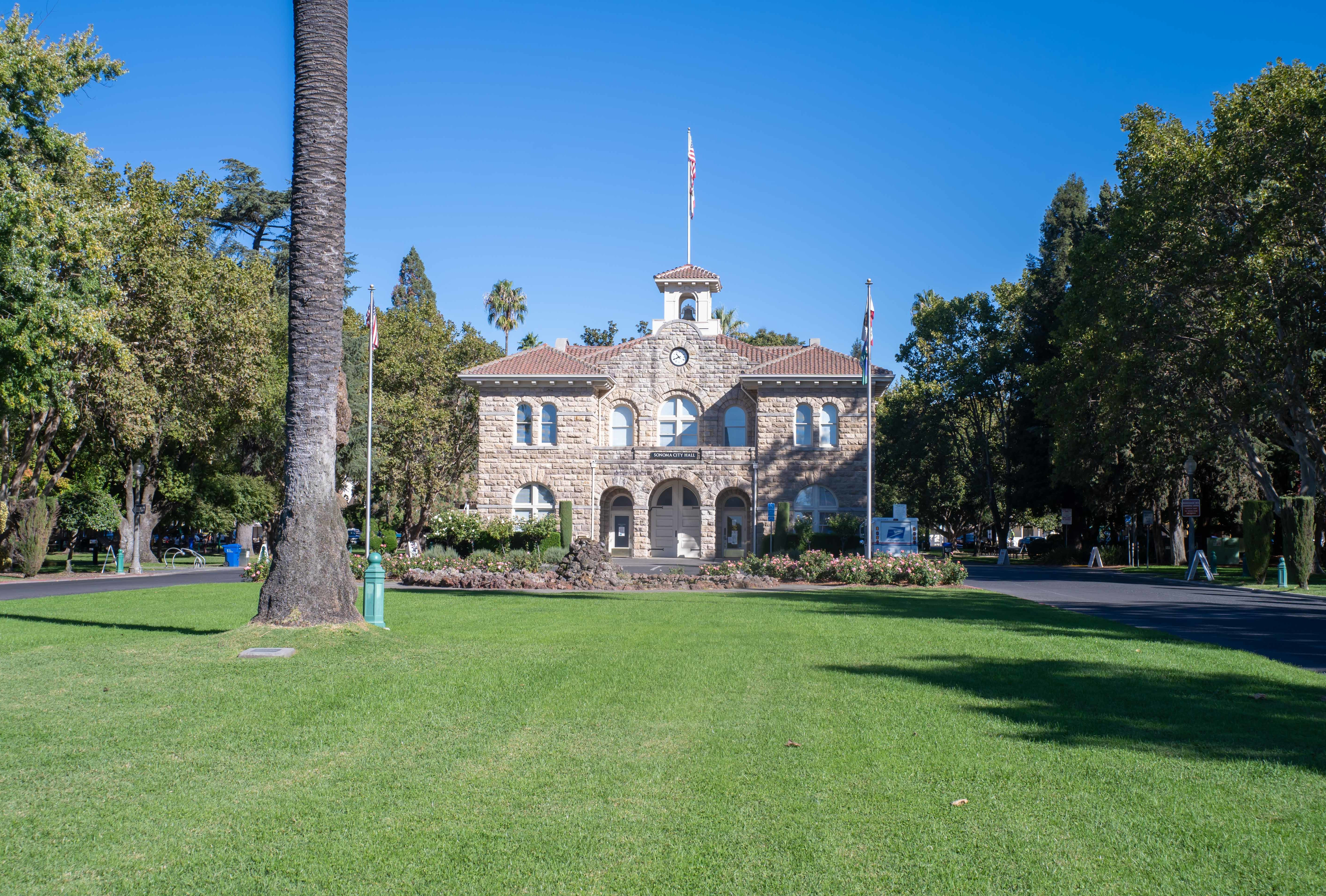

- Location within California Location within the United States
- Location: Sonoma, California
- Coordinates: 38°17′34″N 122°27′28″W
- Built: 1846
- Architectural style: Italianate, Mission/Spanish Revival
- NRHP reference No.: 75000489

Significant dates
- Added to NRHP: April 3, 1975
- Designated NHLD: December 19, 1960

Sonoma Plaza (Spanish: Plaza de Sonoma) is the central plaza of Sonoma, California. The plaza, the largest in California, was laid out in 1835 by Mariano Guadalupe Vallejo, founder of Sonoma.

== Description ==
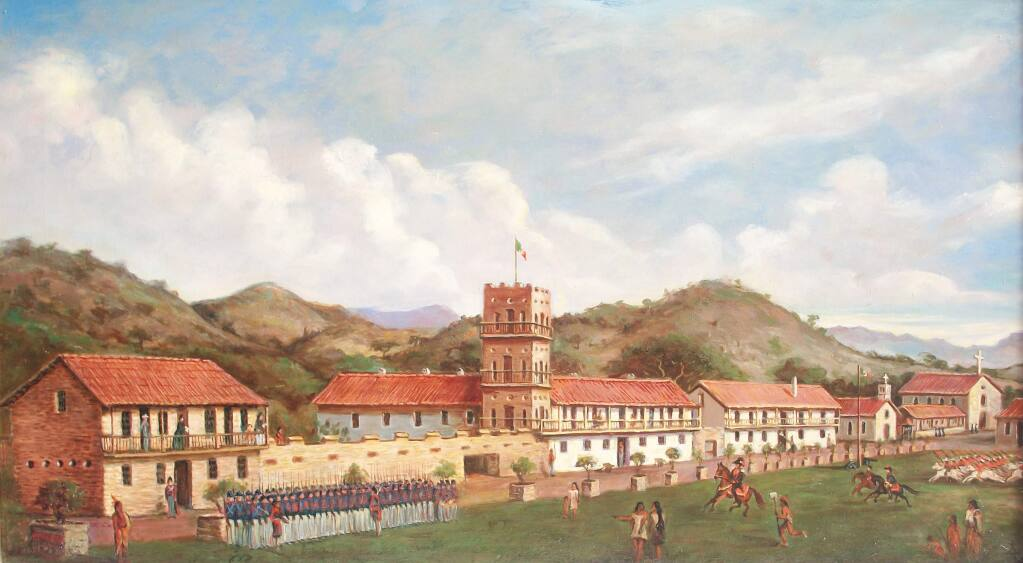
General Mariano Guadalupe Vallejo reviewing his troops in Sonoma Plaza, 1846.

This plaza is surrounded by many historical buildings, including the Mission San Francisco Solano, Captain Salvador Vallejo's Casa Grande, the Presidio of Sonoma, the Blue Wing Inn, and the Toscano Hotel. In the middle of the plaza, Sonoma's early 20th-century city hall, at the plaza's center and still in use, was designed and built with four identical sides in order not to offend the merchants on any one side of the plaza. The plaza is a National Historic Landmark District and still serves as the town's focal point, hosting many community festivals and drawing tourists all year round. It provides a central tourist attraction. "The Plaza", as it is known, is the site of a huge Fourth of July celebration, with thousands of the town's inhabitants attending the festivities. It is also the location of the Farmer's Market, held every Tuesday in the summer.

== History ==
This location was where the Bear Flag Revolt took place in 1846, which led to the founding of the short lived Republic of California.

The Sonoma City Hall was dedicated in 1908.

"For many years, the site in Sonoma Plaza where the bear flag originally had been raised went unmarked. Largely through the efforts of the Native Sons of the Golden West, the legislature appropriated $5,000 for a monument to be placed there. The Native Sons of the Golden West raised $500 to prepare the site, put on dedication ceremonies, and to move the huge rock that serves as the pedestal from a mile away."

== Gallery ==
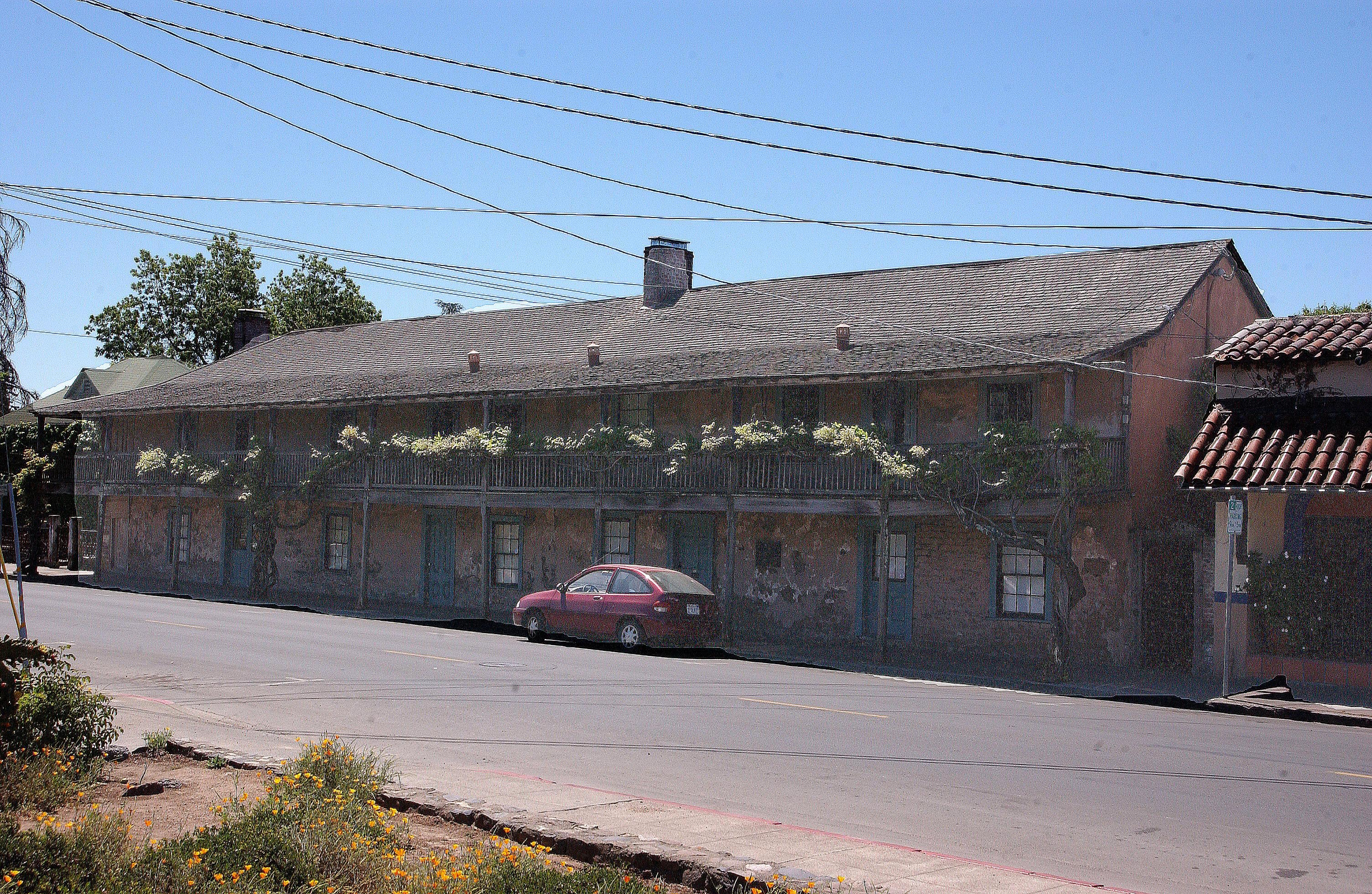
Blue Wing Inn

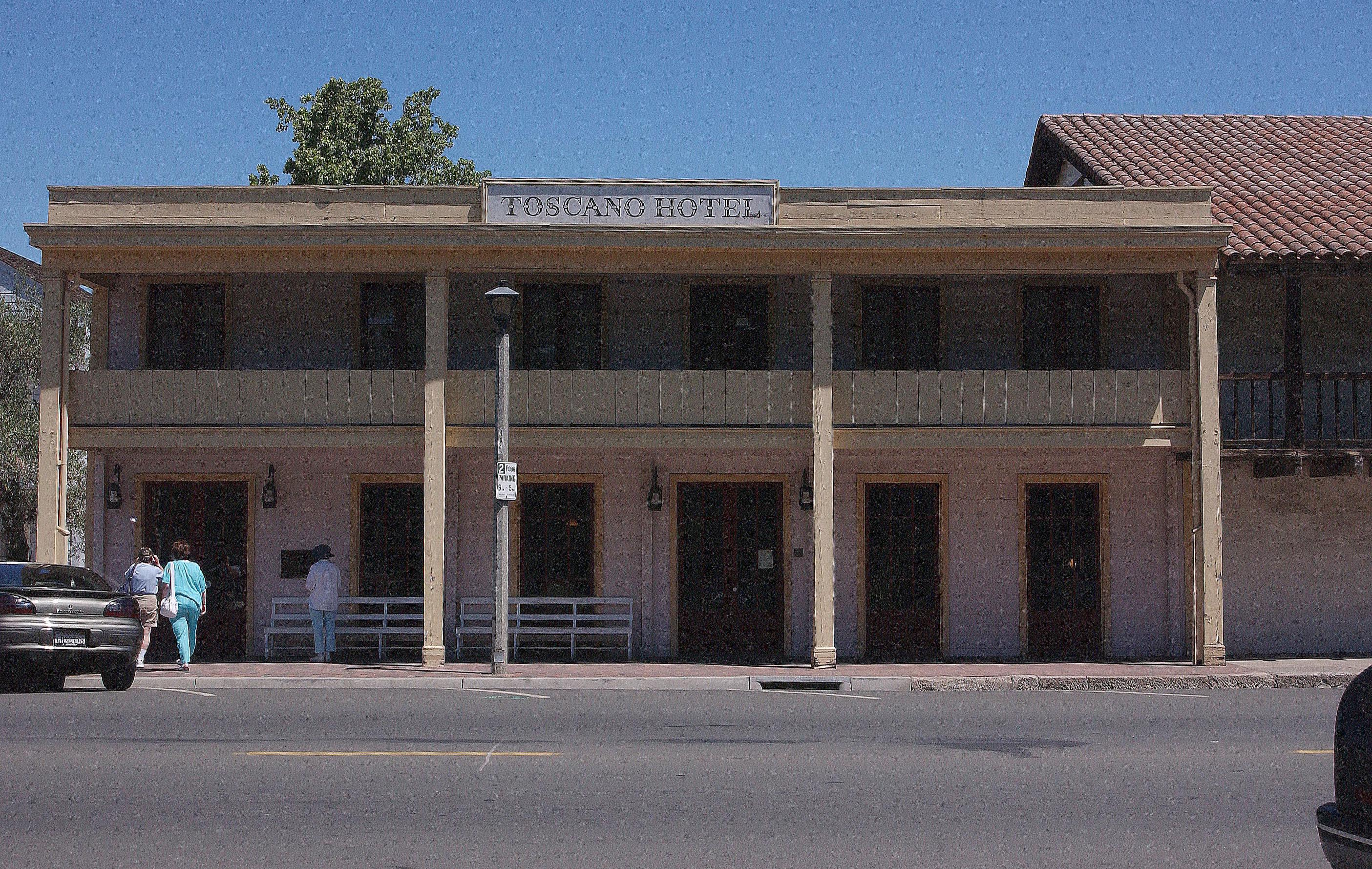
Toscano Hotel

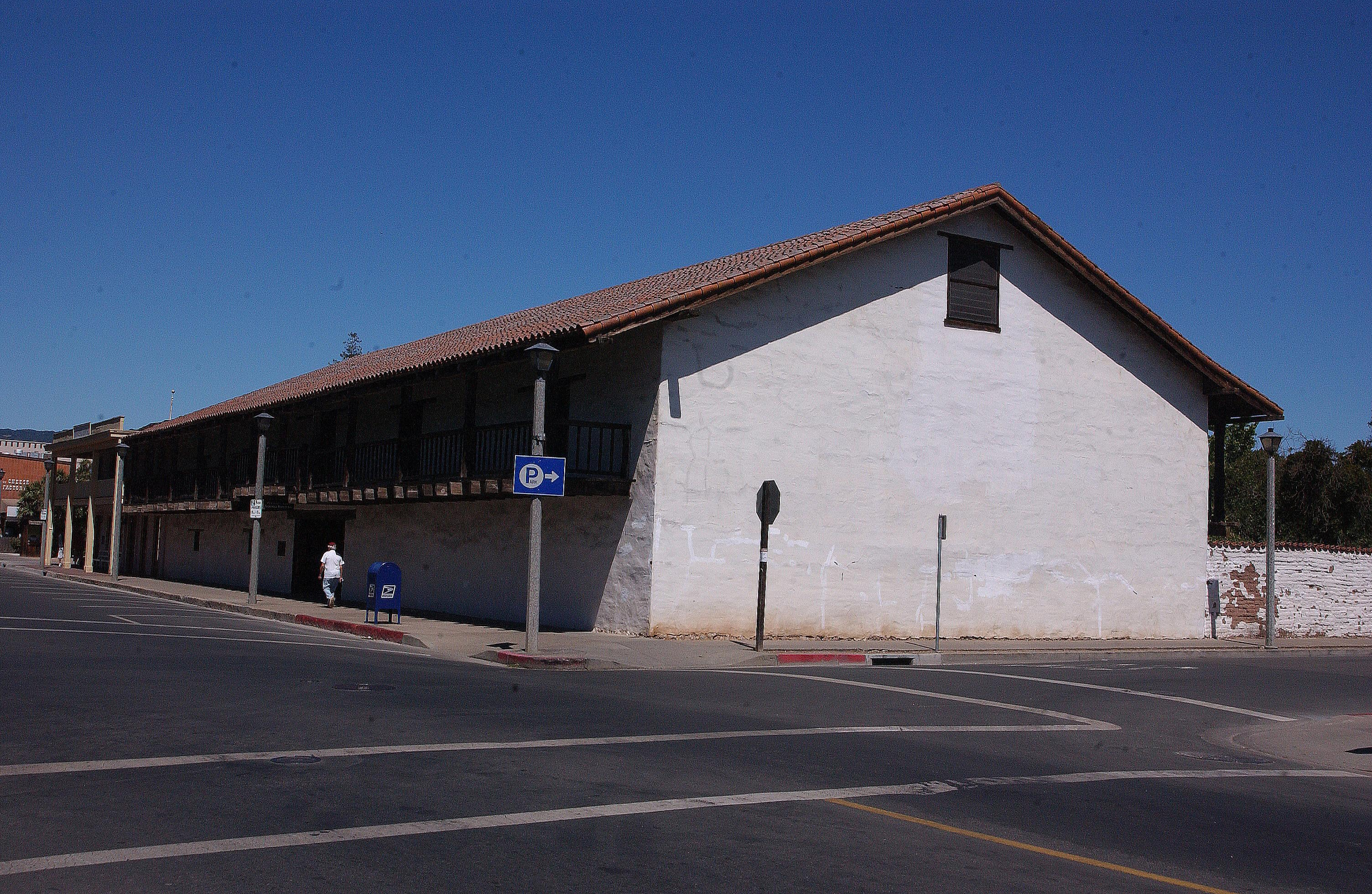
Sonoma Barracks

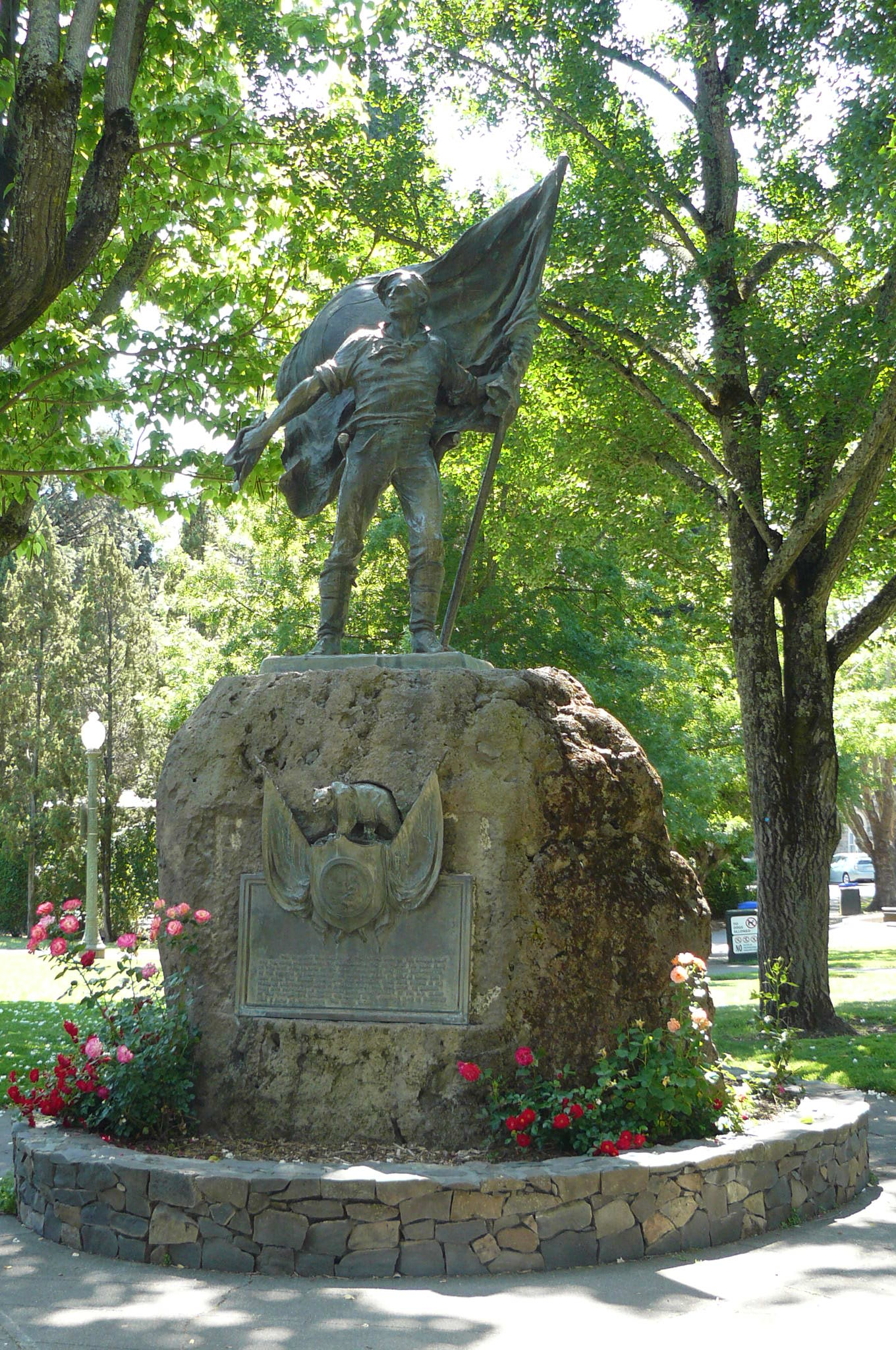
Bear Flag monument

== See also ==
- Sonoma State Historic Park
- Swiss Hotel
- California Historical Landmarks in Sonoma County
- Union Hotel (Sonoma, California)
