= John Medica Gardens =

- Location: Santa Rosa, Sonoma County
- Coordinates: 38.450°N 122.665°W

California Historical Landmark
- Official name: Twentieth Century Folk Art Environments - John Medica Gardens
- Reference no.: 939

The John Medica Gardens are a collection of folk art stoneworks and gardens created by John Medica in Santa Rosa, California in the United States. The gardens are on the list of California Historical Landmarks. The garden is located on a private property. It took Medica 20 years to create the gardens.

== History ==
John Medica was born in Croatia. He owned a turkey farm, which served as the location for the gardens. He started by building a stone wall around the property in 1955. The wall was made of basalt from a former quarry located on the farm. In 1957, he sold his turkey farm and focused on working full-time on developing the gardens.

Medica built a series of castles made out of cement on his property. He taught himself masonry in order to proceed with the development of the gardens. He worked on the project from until 1967 and would work upwards of 12 hours a day on the property. The gardens total 4 acres. He did not draw or plan his designs, he would just start building and see what types of creations developed.

In total, the property has 28 stone buildings. Many of them are over 3 1/2 feet tall and have towers that are 7-feet tall. There are six bridges, three arches that are 8-foot high, a small railroad, a pool, grotto, and walkways. Lights and fountains provided ambiance for the gardens.

== Today ==
When Medica died, the property went into escrow. It was already a California Historical Landmark. Government officials tried to have the property blended into the nearby Spring Lake Park, which was originally property owned by Medica that he donated for public land. The property began to be vandalized and parts of the castles, including abalone shells used as decorations, were stolen. As of today, the property is located in a residential neighborhood. The gardens are inaccessible to the public. The castles have been described as "in disrepair," and in need of conservation. SPACES has been raising funds in order to preserve the space.
