= Sonoma, California =

City in California, United States

- City
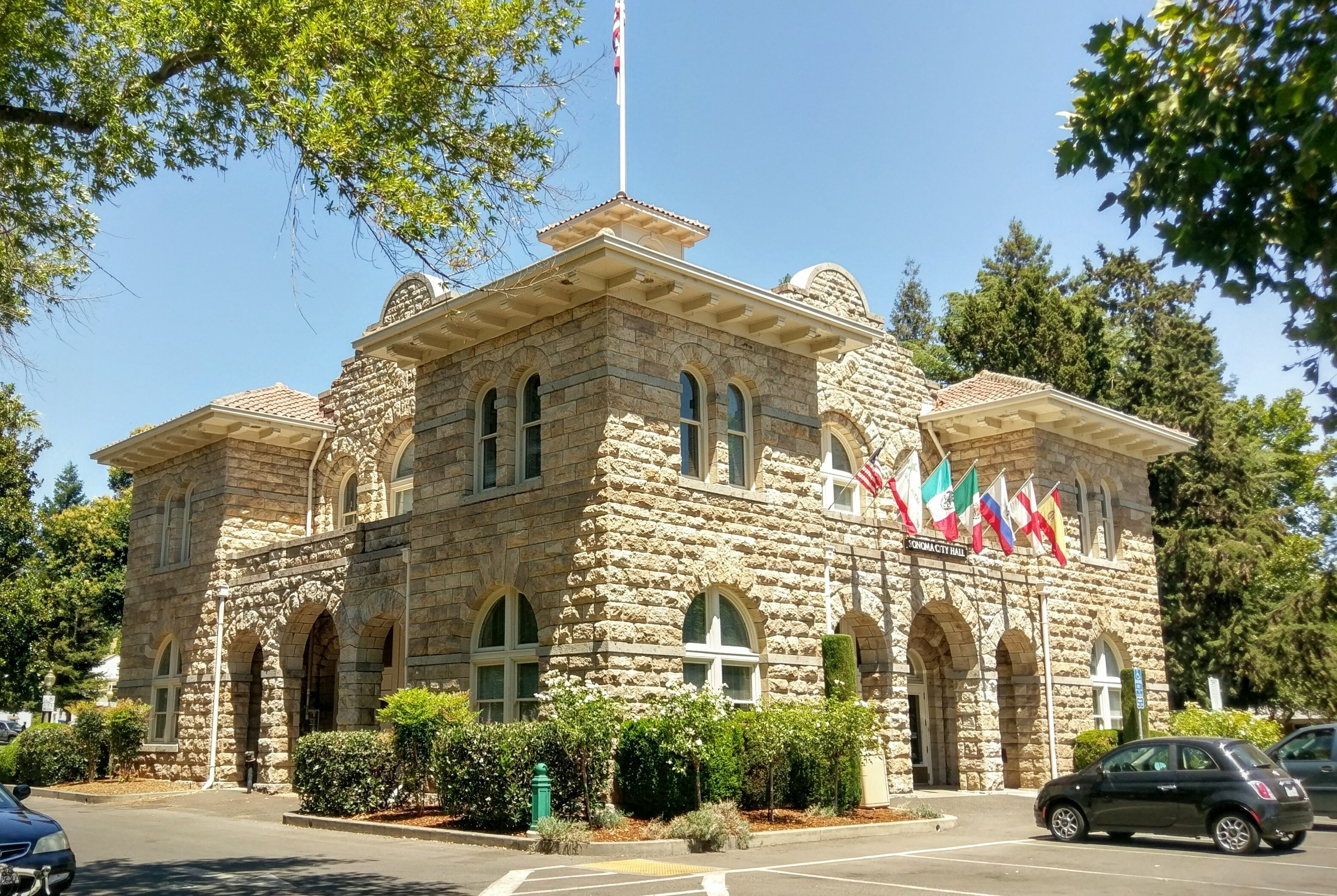
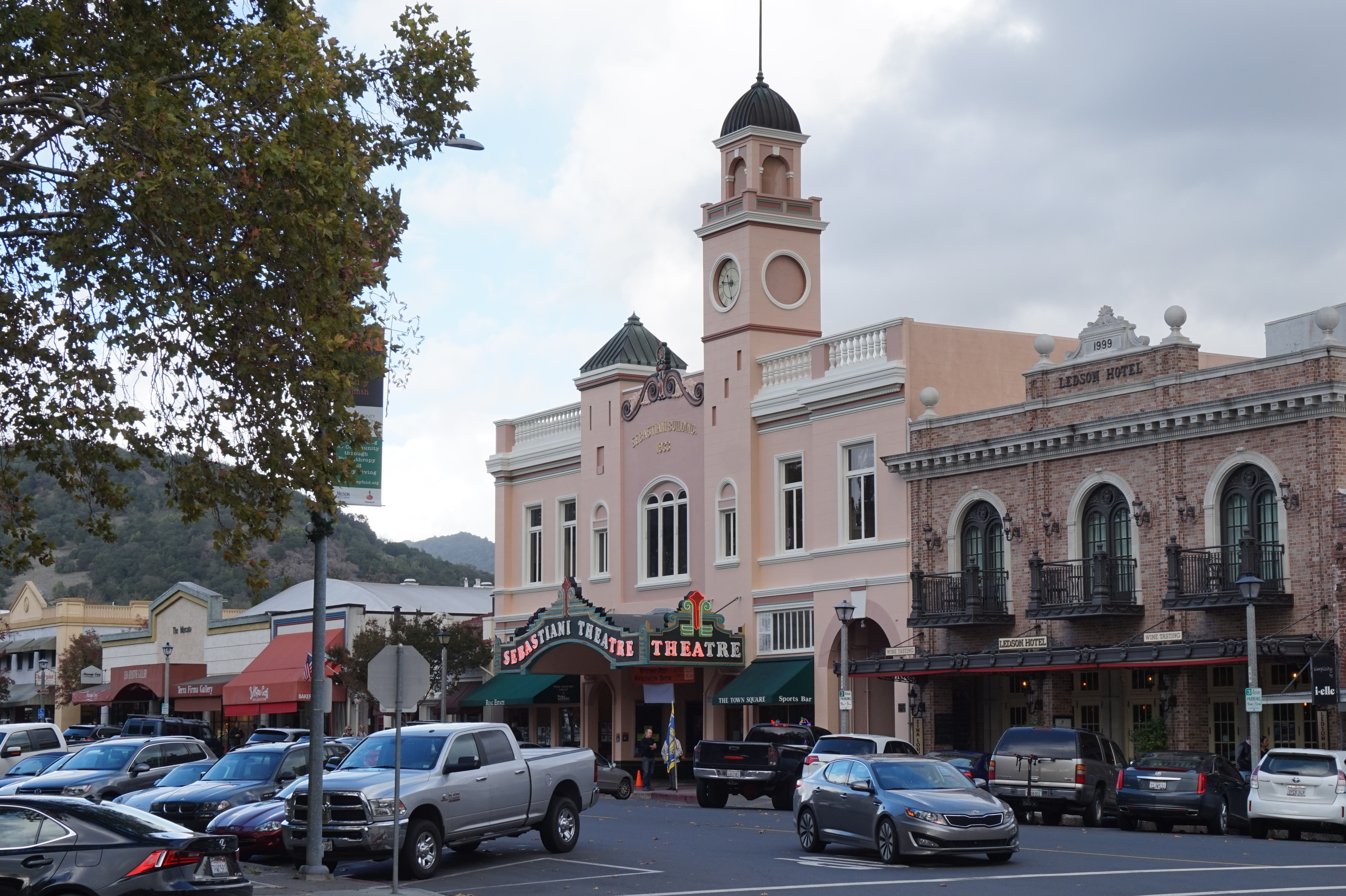
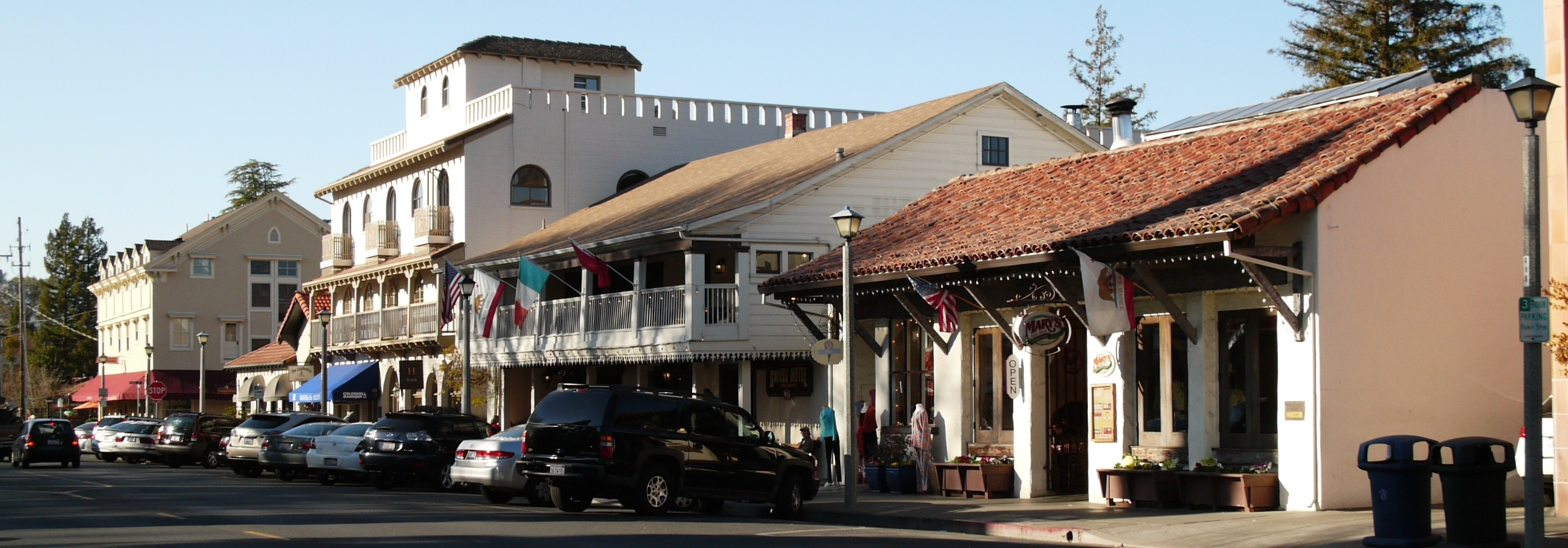
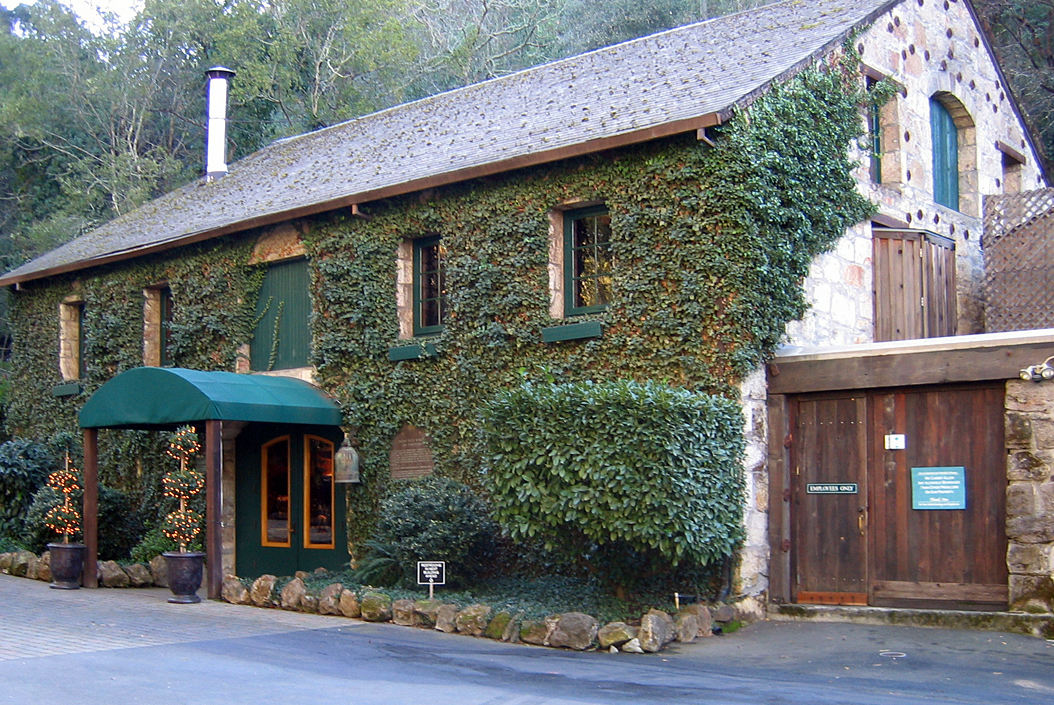
- Top: Sonoma City Hall (left) and shops around Sonoma Plaza (right); middle: shops on Spain St.; bottom: Mission San Francisco Solano (left) and Buena Vista Winery (right)

- Flag
- Interactive map of Sonoma, California
- Location in the United States
- Coordinates: 38°17′31″N 122°27′28″W
- Country: United States
- State: California
- County: Sonoma
- laid out: 1835
- Incorporated: September 3, 1883

Government
  - Type: Council–manager
  - Mayor: Patricia Farrar-Rivas
  - City Manager: David Guhin

Area
  - City: 2.75 sq mi (7.11 km^{2})
  - Land: 2.75 sq mi (7.11 km^{2})
  - Water: 0 sq mi (0.00 km^{2}) 0%
- Elevation: 85 ft (26 m)

Population (2020)
  - City: 10,739
  - Density: 3,914/sq mi (1,511.1/km^{2})
  - Urban: 31,479
- Time zone: UTC-8 (Pacific)
  - Summer (DST): UTC-7 (PDT)
- ZIP code: 95476
- Area code: 707
- FIPS code: 06-72646
- Website: www.sonomacity.org

Sonoma (/səˈnoʊmə/) is a city in Sonoma County, California, United States, located in the North Bay region of the San Francisco Bay Area. Sonoma is one of the principal cities of California's Wine Country and the center of the Sonoma Valley AVA. Sonoma's population was 10,739 as of the 2020 census, while the Sonoma urban area had a population of 31,479. Sonoma is a popular tourist destination, owing to its Californian wineries, noted events like the Sonoma International Film Festival, and its historic center.

Sonoma's origins date to 1823, when Padre José Altimira, Giovanni Toscano, and Giovanni Álvarez established Mission San Francisco Solano, under the direction of Governor Luis Antonio Argüello. Following the Mexican secularization of the missions, Californio statesman Mariano G. Vallejo founded Sonoma on the former mission's lands in 1835. Sonoma served as the base of General Vallejo's operations until the Bear Flag Revolt in 1846, when American filibusters overthrew the local Mexican government and declared the California Republic, ushering in the American Conquest of California.

== History ==
When the first Spaniards arrived, the area was near the northeastern corner of the Native Americans / Aboriginal peoples (Indians) of the Coast Miwok territory, with Southern Pomo to the northwest, Wappo to the northeast, Suisun and Patwin peoples to the east.

=== Mission era ===
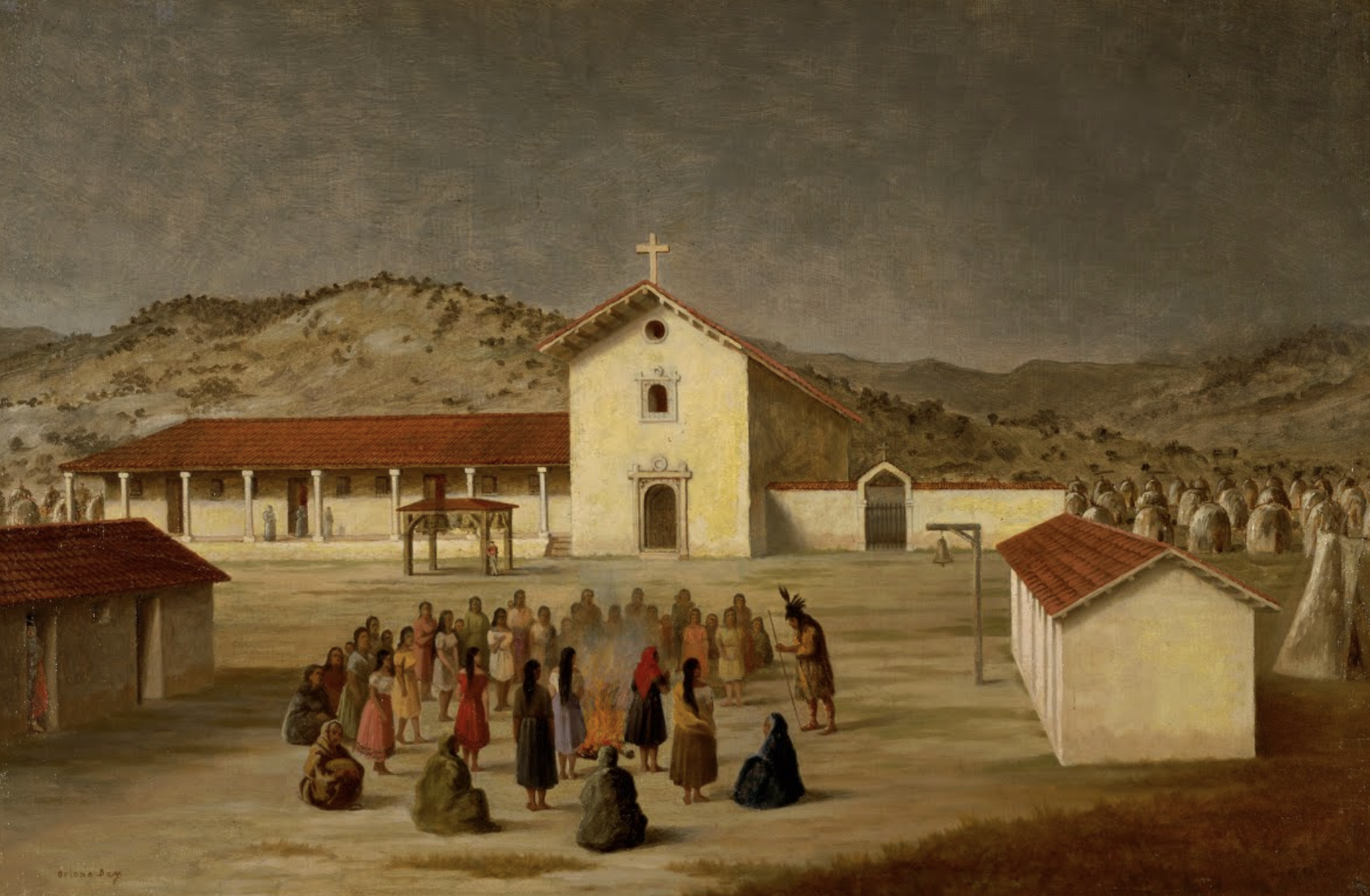
Sonoma's origins trace to 1823, when Mission San Francisco Solano of the Roman Catholic Church, was founded under the direction of Governor Luis Antonio Argüello of Alta California (Upper California) of the Viceroyalty of New Spain of the Kingdom of Spain / Spanish Empire.

Mission San Francisco Solano is the direct predecessor to the founding of the town of Sonoma. The mission, the only to be constructed not by the Spanish but by the later Mexican authorities seeking independence and succeeding to the Royal Spanish Viceroyalty at that time, was built as part of a larger plan Governor Luis Antonio Argüello had devised to fortify the Spanish presence north of the San Francisco Bay and thus deter Russian Empire (Russia) encroachment southward from further north in Russian America (where they'd established a presence back in the 1740s, a half-century before) into the Pacific Ocean coastal region. Franciscan padre / priest José Altimira and Giovanni Toscano worked with Governor Argüello to plan the mission, against the desires of José Francisco de Paula Señan, then the President-General of the Spanish missions in California, who disapproved of secular government intervention into religious matters.

A decade later, the Congress of the Union (Mexican Congress) passed the Mexican secularization act of 1833, ending Roman Catholic Church mission stewardship and control of huge tracts of associated lands in California, one goal being to diminish the church's highly influential standing in California's economy and political system. Then Governor José Figueroa appointed Mariano Guadalupe Vallejo, then the Commandant of the Presidio of San Francisco, as administrator (comisionado) to oversee the closing of Mission San Francisco Solano and its conversion into a civilian town.

=== General Vallejo era ===
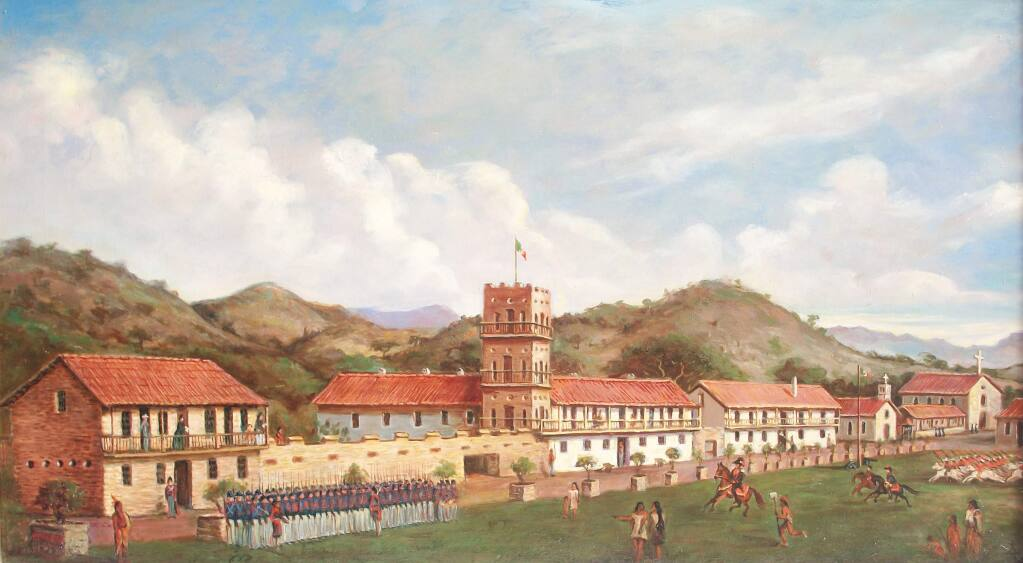
General Mariano G. Vallejo reviewing his Mexican Army troops in Sonoma Plaza, 1846. The building with a tower is General Vallejo's residence, the Casa Grande, and to the right are the Sonoma Barracks.

Governor Figueroa had received instructions from the Mexican Congress further south in the capital city of Mexico City to establish a strong presence in the region north of the San Francisco Bay to protect the area from encroachments of foreigners. An immediate concern was the further south and eastward movement to the interior of the Russian America Company from their settlements at Fort Ross and Bodega Bay on the Northern California coastline.

Figueroa's next step in implementing his instructions was to name Lieutenant Vallejo as Military Commander of the Northern Frontier and to order the Army units of officers / soldiers, arms and materiel supplies at the Presidio of San Francisco moved to the site of the recently secularized Mission San Francisco Solano. The Sonoma Barracks were then built to house the troops. Until the building was habitable, the soldiers were housed in the buildings of the old Mission. In 1834, George C. Yount, the first European American permanent settler in the Napa Valley, north of San Francisco Bay, was employed as a carpenter by Mexican Army General Vallejo.

The Governor granted Lieutenant Vallejo the initial lands (approximately 44,000 acres (178 km^{2})) of Rancho Petaluma immediately west of Sonoma. Vallejo was also named Director of Colonization which meant that he could initiate land grants for other colonists (subject to the approval of the governor) and the diputación (Alta California's nominal assembly / legislature).

Vallejo had also been instructed by Governor Figueroa to establish a pueblo at the site of the old Mission. In 1835, with the assistance of William A. Richardson, he laid out a grid, in accordance with the Spanish Laws of the Indies, of the streets, building lots, central plaza and broad main avenue of the newly planned Pueblo de Sonoma.

Although Sonoma had been founded as a pueblo in 1835, it still remained under military control, lacking the political structures of civilian municipal self-government of other Alta California pueblos. In 1843, now Lieutenant Colonel Vallejo wrote to the Governor recommending that a civil government be organized for Sonoma. A town council (ayuntamiento) was established in 1844 and Jacobo Leese was named first alcalde, and Cayetano Juárez second alcalde.

=== Bear Flag Revolt ===
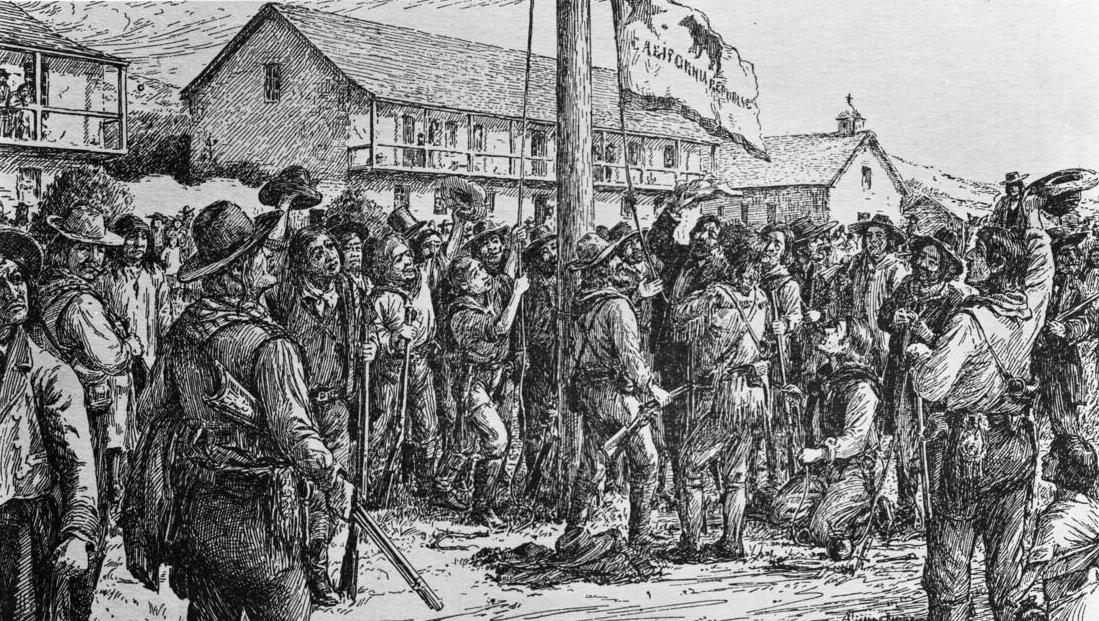
The raising of the Bear Flag and proclamation of the new independent California Republic in Sonoma Plaza, following the so-called Bear Flag Revolt on June 14, 1846

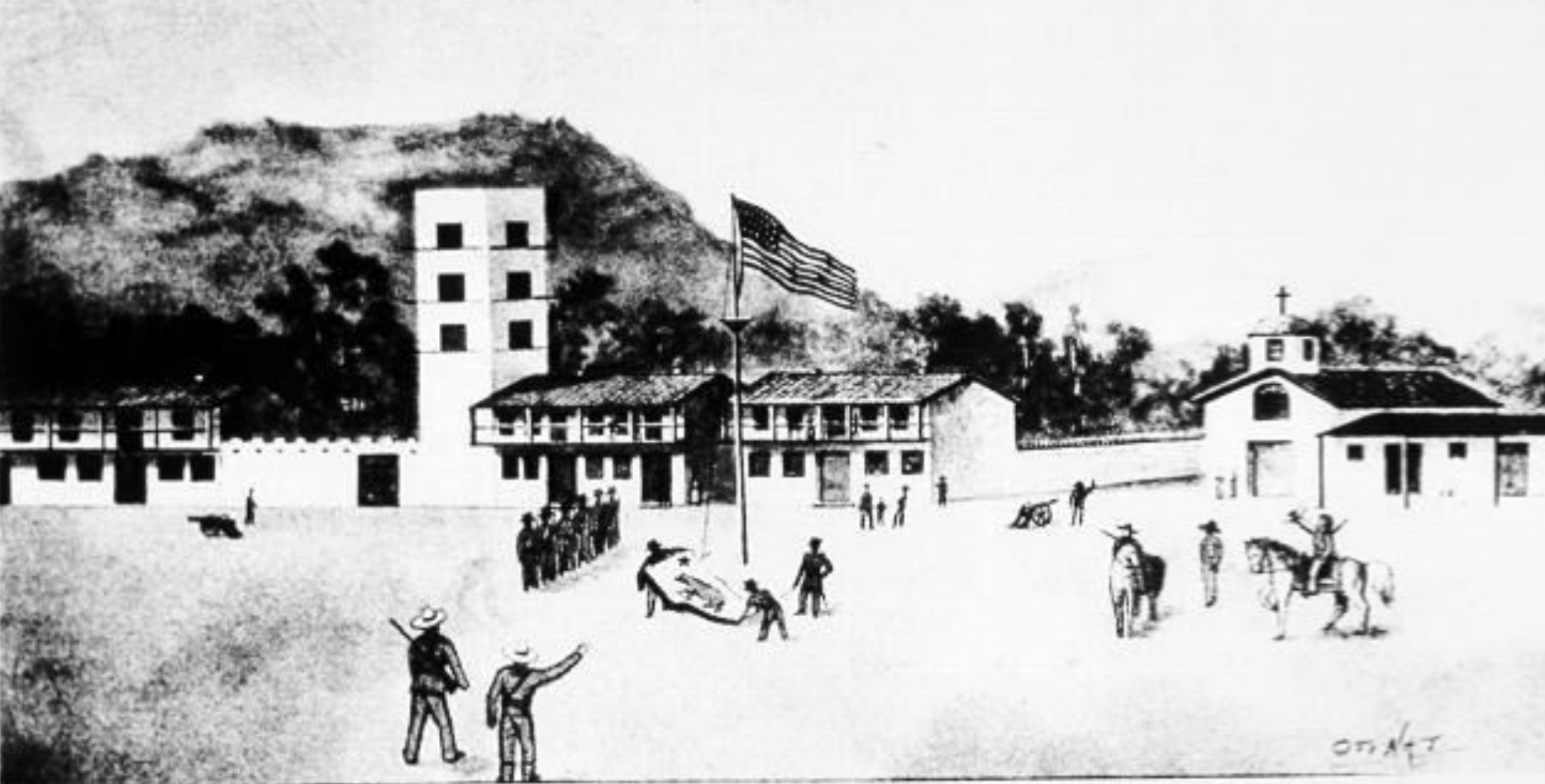
Joseph Revere of the United States Navy lowering the California Republic Bear Flag and raising the United States flag

Before dawn on Sunday, June 14, 1846, thirty-three Americans, already in rebellion against the Alta California provincial government of Mexico, arrived in Sonoma. Some of the group had traveled from the camp of United States Army Brevet Captain John C. Frémont (1813–1890), who had entered California illegally from across the Great Plains and through the Rocky Mountains chain from the east in late 1845 with his exploration and mapping expedition. Others had joined along the way. As the number of immigrants arriving in California had swelled, the Mexican government barred them from buying or renting land and threatened them with expulsion because they had entered without official permission. Mexican officials were concerned about the coming Mexican–American War of 1846–1848, with the United States coupled with the growing influx of American and other European immigrants into California, both by overland wagon trains from the east and by ship on the West Coast and Pacific Ocean.

A group of rebellious Americans had departed from Captain Frémont's military camp on June 10 and captured a herd of 170 Mexican government-owned horses being moved by Californio / Mexican Army soldiers from San Rafael and Sonoma to Alta California's Commandante General José Castro in Santa Clara. The insurgents next determined to seize the weapons, gunpowder and materiel stored in the Sonoma Barracks and to deny Sonoma to the Californios as a rallying point north of the San Francisco Bay.

Meeting no resistance, they approached the home of General Vallejo, who invited the filibusters' leaders into his home to negotiate terms. However, when the agreement was presented to those outside they refused to endorse and accept it. Rather than releasing the Mexican officers under parole, they insisted they be held as hostages. William Ide (1796–1852), gave an impassioned speech urging the rebels to stay in Sonoma and start a new republic. Afterwards, Vallejo and his three associates were taken as prisoners and placed on horseback and taken to Captain Frémont.

The Sonoma Barracks became the headquarters for the remaining twenty-four rebels, who within a few days created their Bear Flag. After the flag was raised Californios called the insurgents Los Osos (The Bears) because of their flag and in derision of their often scruffy appearance. The rebels embraced the expression, and their uprising became known as the Bear Flag Revolt. There were some small unit skirmishes between the Bears and the Californios but no major confrontations.

After hearing reports that General José Castro was preparing to attack Sonoma, Frémont left Sutter's Fort with his forces for Sonoma. There he called a meeting with "the Bears" and united his forces with the revolters to form a single military unit. Frémont then took the majority of the men back to Sutter's Fort and left fifty men to defend Sonoma. The Bear Flag Revolt ended and the California Republic ceased to exist on July 9 when Lieutenant Joseph Warren Revere of the U.S. Navy raised the United States flag in front of the Sonoma Barracks.

=== Post-Conquest era ===
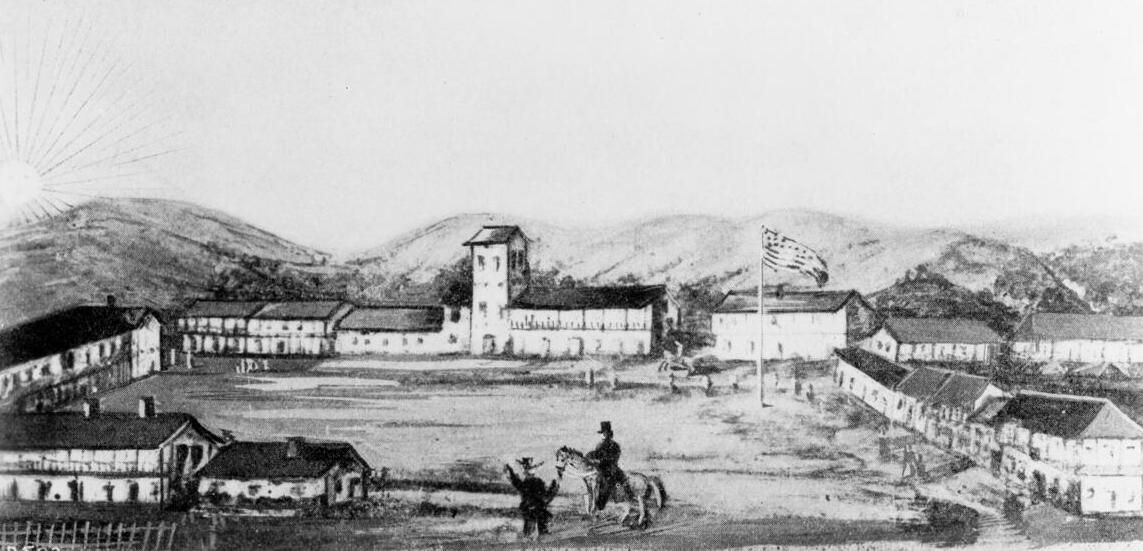
View of Sonoma Plaza, c. 1874

Following the American Conquest of California and the advent of the California Gold Rush, local businesses prospered with the business brought by the soldiers as well as miners traveling to and from the gold fields. The prosperity and optimism about Sonoma's future promoted land speculation which was particularly problematic because of the cloudy records regarding land ownership.

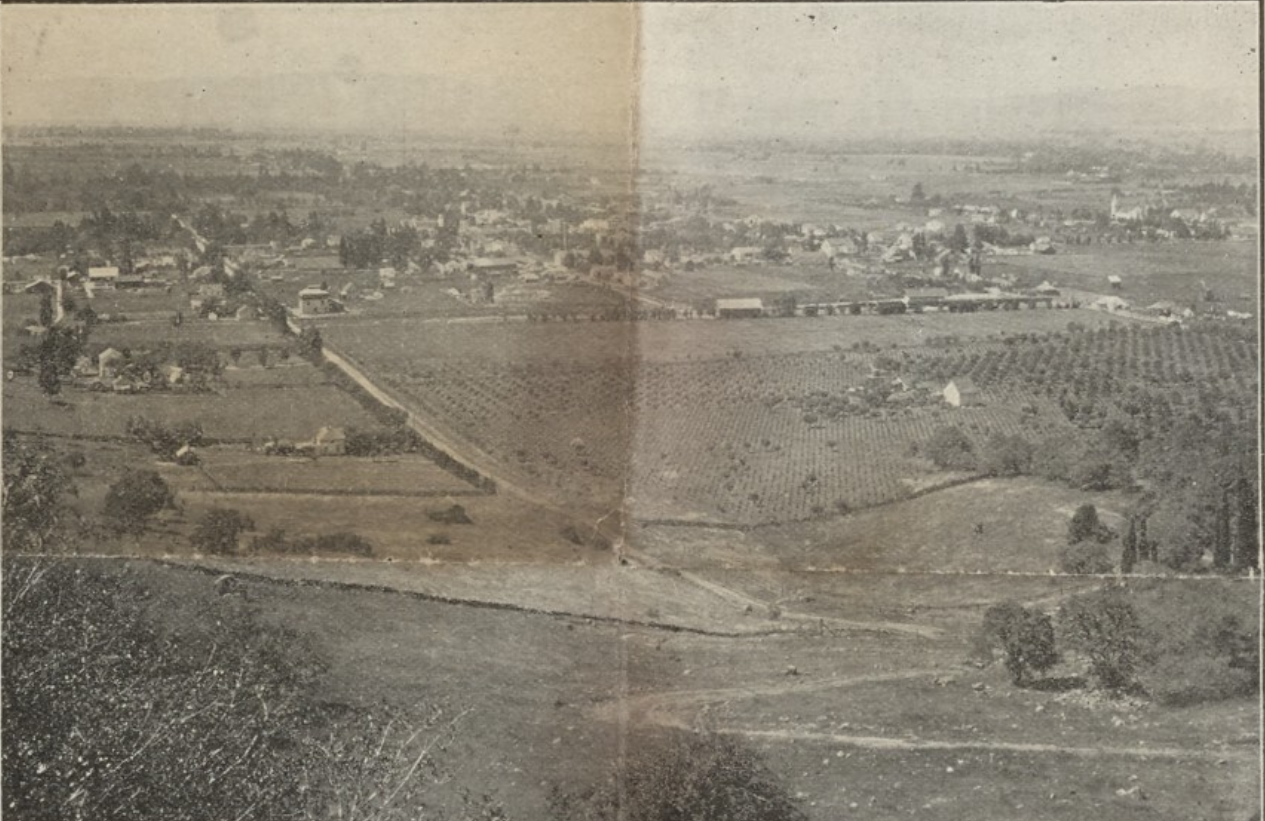
Birds-eye view of Sonoma, 1906

Vallejo had granted land by virtue of his office as Director of Colonization before the pueblo was organized. Among the traditional duties of Alta California's alcaldes was the selling of town lots. Political factions backed different Sonoma alcaldes (John H. Nash, supported by American immigrants, and Lilburn Boggs (1796–1860), supported by Vallejo and the Californios) made the situation more complex. Some property was sold more than once. A valid land sale depended on proof of the seller's chain of title. Over thirty subsequent years of lawsuits and land disputes were required before land owners in Sonoma were able to obtain clear titles.

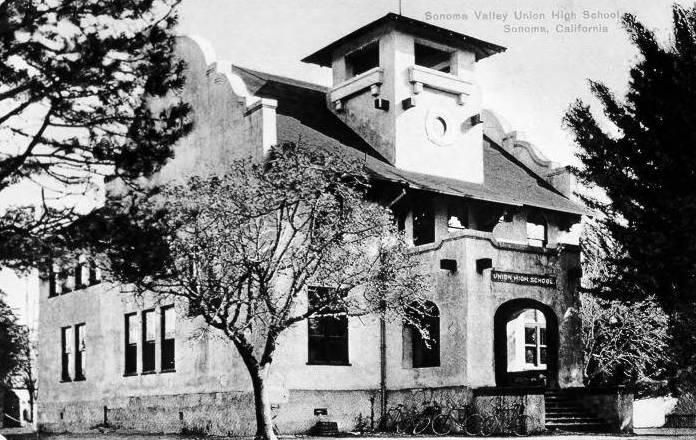
Sonoma Valley High School, 1910

When the California interim government and U.S. military occupation beginning 1846, finally ended after four years in 1850, when California was admitted as the 31st state to the federal Union by act of the U.S. Congress, approved by the President, on September 9, 1850, Sonoma was then named the first county seat town for Sonoma County. About that time, the flow of miners had slowed and the U.S. Army was soon leaving Sonoma. Business in Sonoma moved into an economic recession in 1851. Surrounding towns such as Petaluma and Santa Rosa were developing and gaining population much faster than Sonoma. An 1854 special election then moved the county seat and courthouse and its legal work and entailed economic activity to Santa Rosa.

=== Contemporary era ===
The Sonoma City Hall, located in the center of the Sonoma Plaza, was dedicated on September 9, 1908.

The United States Navy operated a rest center at the Mission Inn through World War II.

Parts of Wes Craven's Scream (1996) were filmed in the city, with shots of the Sonoma Community Center masked as Westboro High School.

The center of town, known as the Plaza, is home to a Farmers Market on Tuesdays during season.

== Geography ==
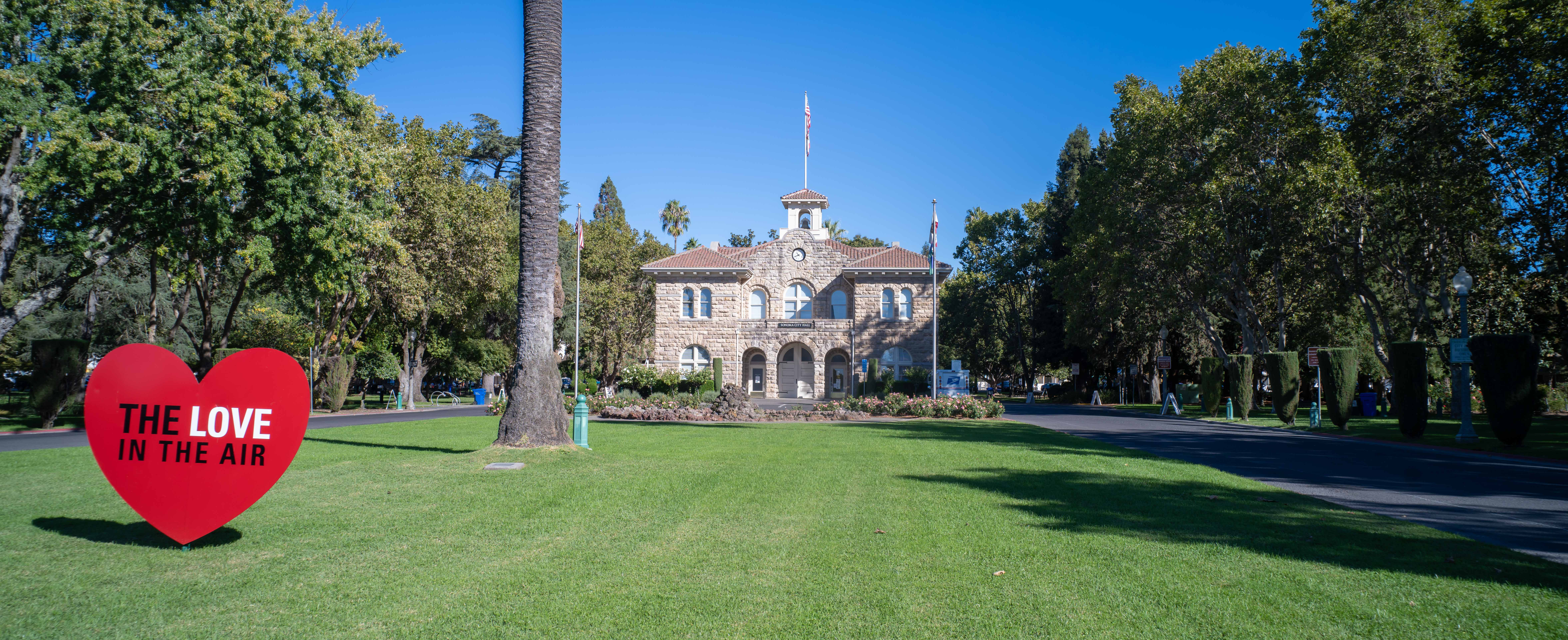
Sonoma Plaza from the south

The city is situated in the Sonoma Valley, with the Mayacamas Mountains to the east and the Sonoma Mountains to the west, with the prominent landform Sears Point to the southwest. Sonoma has an area of 2.7 sq mi (7.0 km^{2}), all land.

The principal watercourse in the town is Sonoma Creek, which flows in a southerly direction to discharge ultimately to the Napa Sonoma Marsh; Arroyo Seco Creek is a tributary to Schell Creek with a confluence in the eastern portion of the town. The active Rodgers Fault lies to the west of Sonoma Creek; however, the risk of major damage is mitigated by the fact that most of the soils beneath the city consist of a slight alluvial terrace underlain by strongly cemented sedimentary and volcanic rock. To the immediate south, west and east are deeper rich, alluvial soils that support valuable agricultural cultivation. The mountain block to the north rises to 1,200 feet (370 m) and provides an important scenic backdrop.

=== Climate ===
Sonoma has a typical lowland near-coastal Californian warm-summer mediterranean climate (Köppen climate classification Csb) with hot, dry summers (although nights are comfortably cool) and cool, wet winters. In January, the normal high is 57.2 °F (14.0 °C) and the typical low is 37.2 °F (2.9 °C). In July, the normal high is 88.6 °F (31.4 °C) and the normal low is 51.2 °F (10.7 °C). There are an average of 58.1 days with highs of 90 °F (32 °C) or higher and 12.1 days with highs of 100 °F (38 °C). The highest temperature on record was 116 °F (47 °C) on July 13, 1972, and the lowest temperature was 13 °F (−11 °C) on December 22, 1990. Normal annual precipitation is 29.43 in (748 mm). The wettest month on record was 20.29 in (515 mm) in January 1995. The greatest 24-hour rainfall was 6.75 in (171 mm) on January 4, 1982. There are an average of 68.6 days with measurable precipitation. Snow has rarely fallen, but 1 in (2.5 cm) fell in January 1907; more recently, snow flurries were observed on February 5, 1976, and in the winter of 2001.

Climate data for Sonoma, California, 1991–2020 normals, extremes 1893–present
Month	Jan	Feb	Mar	Apr	May	Jun	Jul	Aug	Sep	Oct	Nov	Dec	Year
Record high °F (°C)	84 (29)	98 (37)	90 (32)	100 (38)	105 (41)	112 (44)	116 (47)	108 (42)	110 (43)	107 (42)	91 (33)	80 (27)	116 (47)
Mean maximum °F (°C)	67.2 (19.6)	73.0 (22.8)	78.3 (25.7)	85.2 (29.6)	91.1 (32.8)	100.3 (37.9)	101.1 (38.4)	100.4 (38.0)	99.1 (37.3)	91.3 (32.9)	78.6 (25.9)	67.2 (19.6)	104.0 (40.0)
Mean daily maximum °F (°C)	57.0 (13.9)	61.6 (16.4)	65.4 (18.6)	69.2 (20.7)	75.3 (24.1)	82.8 (28.2)	86.0 (30.0)	86.1 (30.1)	84.8 (29.3)	77.5 (25.3)	65.2 (18.4)	56.7 (13.7)	72.3 (22.4)
Daily mean °F (°C)	47.7 (8.7)	50.8 (10.4)	53.7 (12.1)	56.7 (13.7)	61.6 (16.4)	67.1 (19.5)	69.7 (20.9)	69.6 (20.9)	68.0 (20.0)	62.5 (16.9)	53.5 (11.9)	47.4 (8.6)	59.0 (15.0)
Mean daily minimum °F (°C)	38.4 (3.6)	40.1 (4.5)	41.9 (5.5)	44.1 (6.7)	47.8 (8.8)	51.3 (10.7)	53.5 (11.9)	53.2 (11.8)	51.2 (10.7)	47.4 (8.6)	41.8 (5.4)	38.2 (3.4)	45.7 (7.6)
Mean minimum °F (°C)	27.8 (−2.3)	30.0 (−1.1)	32.6 (0.3)	35.1 (1.7)	40.0 (4.4)	44.0 (6.7)	47.3 (8.5)	47.0 (8.3)	44.1 (6.7)	38.0 (3.3)	31.4 (−0.3)	27.7 (−2.4)	25.6 (−3.6)
Record low °F (°C)	20 (−7)	20 (−7)	24 (−4)	20 (−7)	27 (−3)	31 (−1)	35 (2)	36 (2)	34 (1)	30 (−1)	22 (−6)	13 (−11)	13 (−11)
Average precipitation inches (mm)	5.47 (139)	5.42 (138)	3.84 (98)	1.78 (45)	1.03 (26)	0.32 (8.1)	0.00 (0.00)	0.06 (1.5)	0.07 (1.8)	1.52 (39)	3.01 (76)	5.83 (148)	28.35 (720.4)
Average precipitation days (≥ 0.01 in)	11.4	10.9	9.8	6.5	4.0	1.1	0.1	0.2	0.7	3.6	7.5	11.8	67.6
Source 1: NOAA
Source 2: XMACIS2

== Demographics ==
Historical population
Census	Pop.	Note	%±
1890	757		—
1900	652		−13.9%
1910	957		46.8%
1920	801		−16.3%
1930	980		22.3%
1940	1,158		18.2%
1950	2,015		74.0%
1960	3,023		50.0%
1970	4,259		40.9%
1980	6,054		42.1%
1990	8,121		34.1%
2000	9,128		12.4%
2010	10,648		16.7%
2020	10,739		0.9%
U.S. Decennial Census; 1860–1870 1880-1890; 1900 1910 1920; 1930 1940 1950; 1960 1970 1980; 1990 2000 2010; 2020

=== 2020 census ===
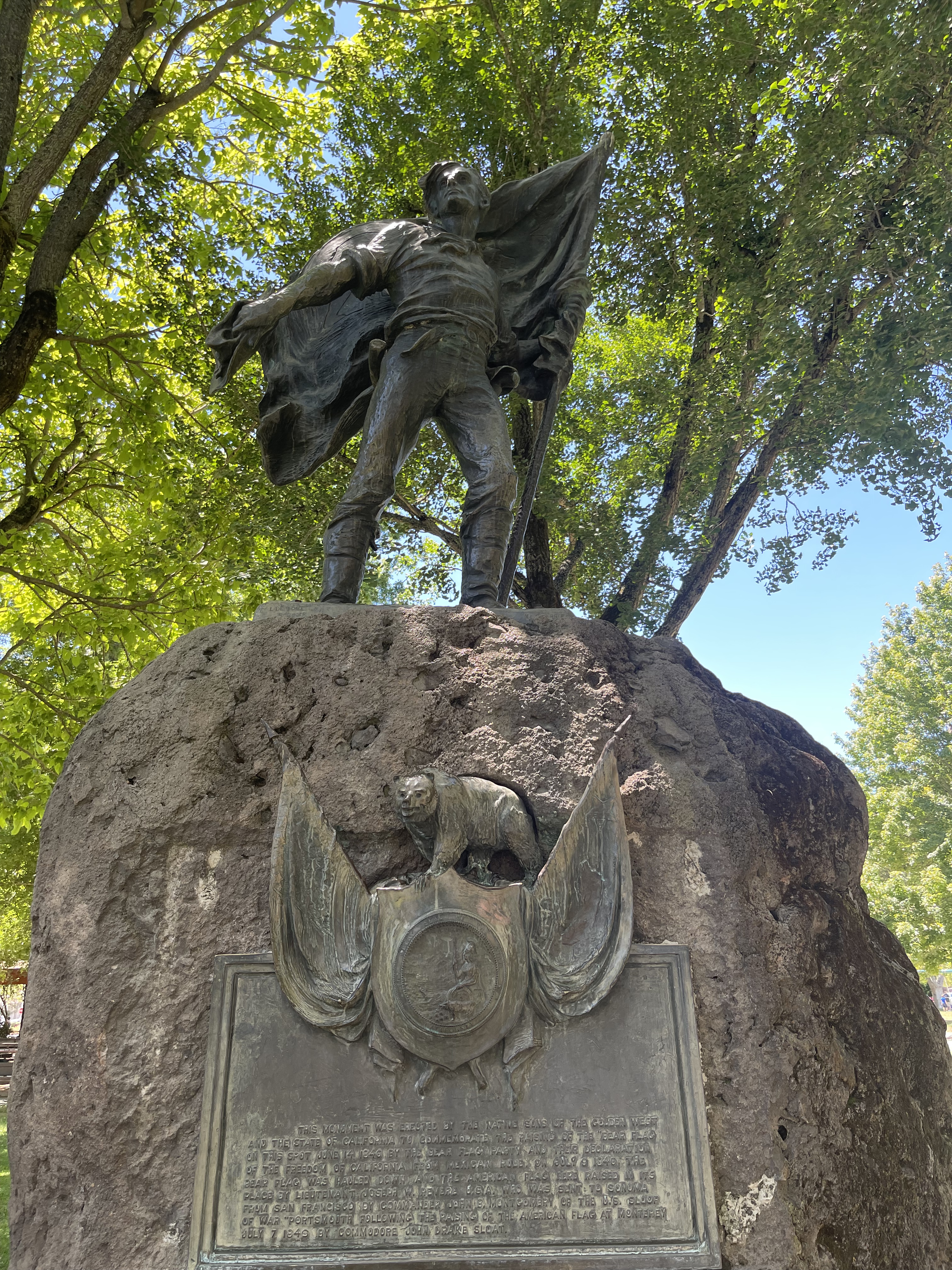
Bear Flag Monument

As of the 2020 census, Sonoma had a population of 10,739 and a population density of 3,913.6 inhabitants per square mile (1,511.0/km^{2}). The median age was 53.4 years. 15.7% of residents were under the age of 18 and 32.5% of residents were 65 years of age or older. For every 100 females, there were 82.4 males, and for every 100 females age 18 and over there were 78.9 males age 18 and over.

The census reported that 98.3% of the population lived in households, 0.2% lived in non-institutionalized group quarters, and 1.5% were institutionalized. 100.0% of residents lived in urban areas, while 0.0% lived in rural areas.

There were 4,957 households, of which 20.9% had children under the age of 18 living in them. Of all households, 43.1% were married-couple households, 6.1% were cohabiting couple households, 15.3% were households with a male householder and no spouse or partner present, and 35.5% were households with a female householder and no spouse or partner present. About 36.7% of all households were made up of individuals and 25.2% had someone living alone who was 65 years of age or older. The average household size was 2.13. There were 2,798 families (56.4% of all households).

There were 5,628 housing units at an average density of 2,051.0 units per square mile (791.9 units/km^{2}), of which 4,957 (88.1%) were occupied. Of occupied units, 57.3% were owner-occupied and 42.7% were occupied by renters. Of all housing units, 11.9% were vacant. The homeowner vacancy rate was 1.3% and the rental vacancy rate was 7.4%.

Racial composition as of the 2020 census
Race	Number	Percent
White	8,023	74.7%
Black or African American	77	0.7%
American Indian and Alaska Native	98	0.9%
Asian	328	3.1%
Native Hawaiian and Other Pacific Islander	24	0.2%
Some other race	931	8.7%
Two or more races	1,258	11.7%
Hispanic or Latino (of any race)	2,072	19.3%

=== 2023 ACS 5-year estimates ===
In 2023, the US Census Bureau estimated that the median household income was $101,281, and the per capita income was $72,127. About 4.5% of families and 8.5% of the population were below the poverty line.

=== 2010 census ===
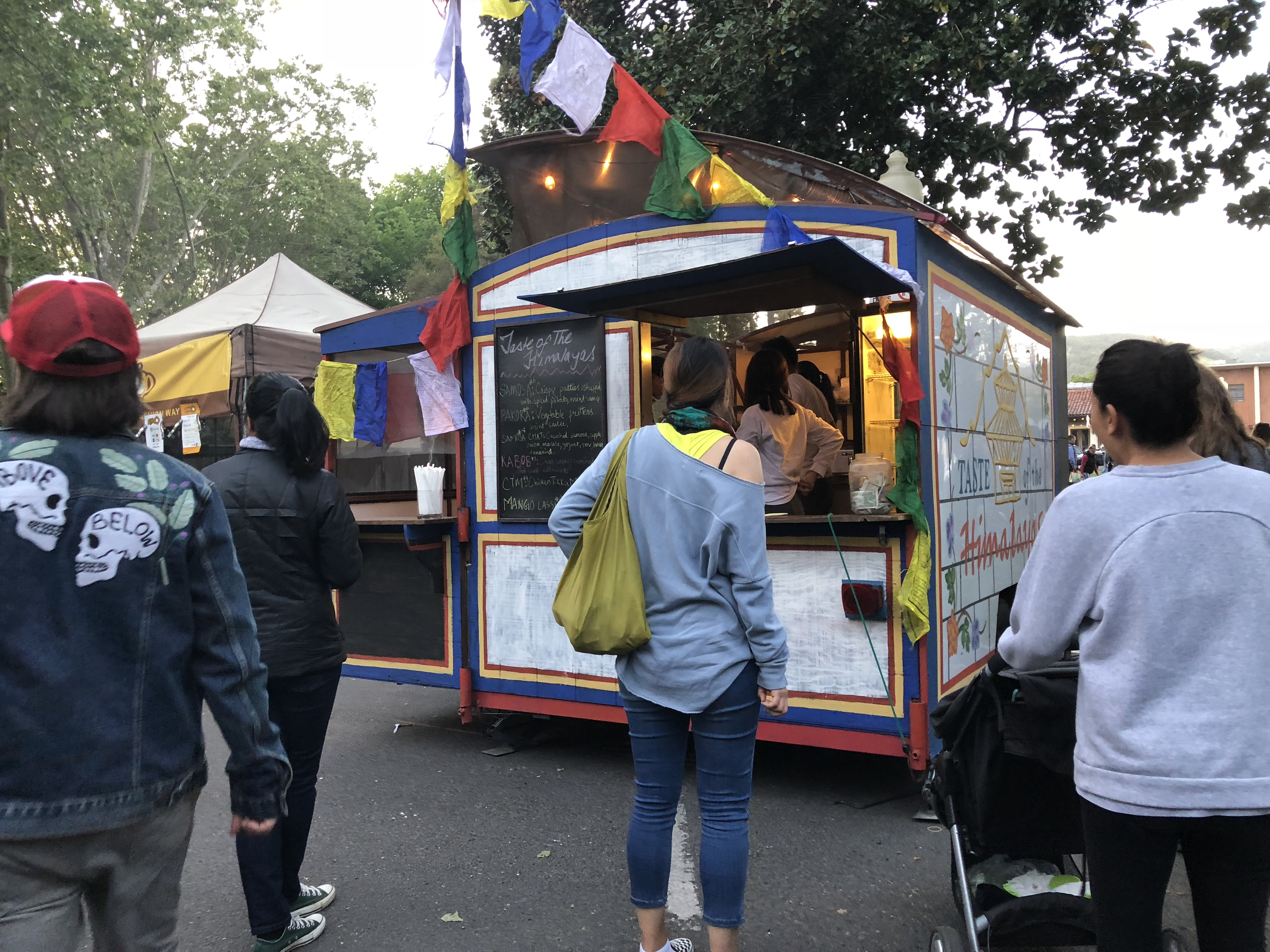
International vendors at Valley of the Moon Farmer's Market

The 2010 United States census reported that Sonoma had a population of 10,648. The population density was 3,883.3 inhabitants per square mile (1,499.4/km^{2}). The racial makeup of Sonoma was 9,242 (86.8%) White, 52 (0.5%) African American, 56 (0.5%) Native American, 300 (2.8%) Asian, 23 (0.2%) Pacific Islander, 711 (6.7%) from other races, and 264 (2.5%) from two or more races. Hispanic or Latino of any race were 1,634 persons (15.3%).

Within the Sonoma Valley, the racial makeup was 46.3% White, 49.1% Hispanic, and 2.7% Native American. The average household income was $96,722. The Census reported that 10,411 people (97.8% of the population) lived in households, 11 (0.1%) lived in non-institutionalized group quarters, and 226 (2.1%) were institutionalized.

There were 4,955 households, out of which 1,135 (22.9%) had children under the age of 18 living in them, 2,094 (42.3%) were married couples living together, 425 (8.6%) had a female householder with no husband present, 174 (3.5%) had a male householder with no wife present. There were 230 (4.6%) unmarried partnerships, and 48 (1.0%) same-sex married couples or partnerships. 1,920 households (38.7%) were made up of individuals, and 1,054 (21.3%) had someone living alone who was 65 years of age or older. The average household size was 2.10. There were 2,693 families (54.3% of all households); the average family size was 2.82.

The population was spread out, with 1,920 people (18.0%) under the age of 18, 559 people (5.2%) aged 18 to 24, 2,252 people (21.1%) aged 25 to 44, 3,250 people (30.5%) aged 45 to 64, and 2,667 people (25.0%) who were 65 years of age or older. The median age was 49.2 years. For every 100 females, there were 83.6 males. For every 100 females age 18 and over, there were 78.8 males.

There were 5,544 housing units at an average density of 2,021.9 units per square mile (780.7 units/km^{2}), of which 2,928 (59.1%) were owner-occupied, and 2,027 (40.9%) were occupied by renters. The homeowner vacancy rate was 2.6%; the rental vacancy rate was 7.0%. 6,294 people (59.1% of the population) lived in owner-occupied housing units and 4,117 people (38.7%) lived in rental housing units.

== Government ==
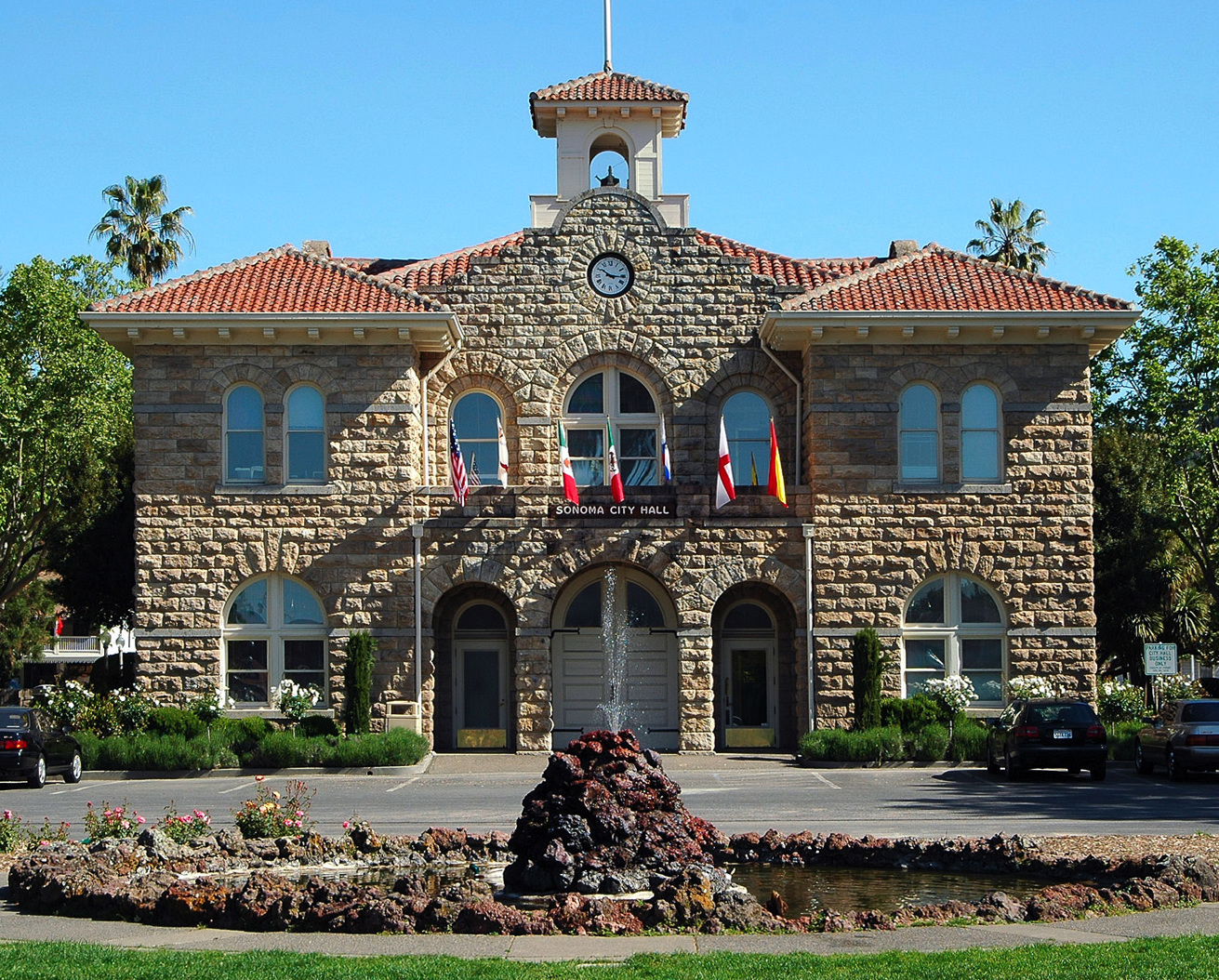
Sonoma City Hall in Sonoma Plaza

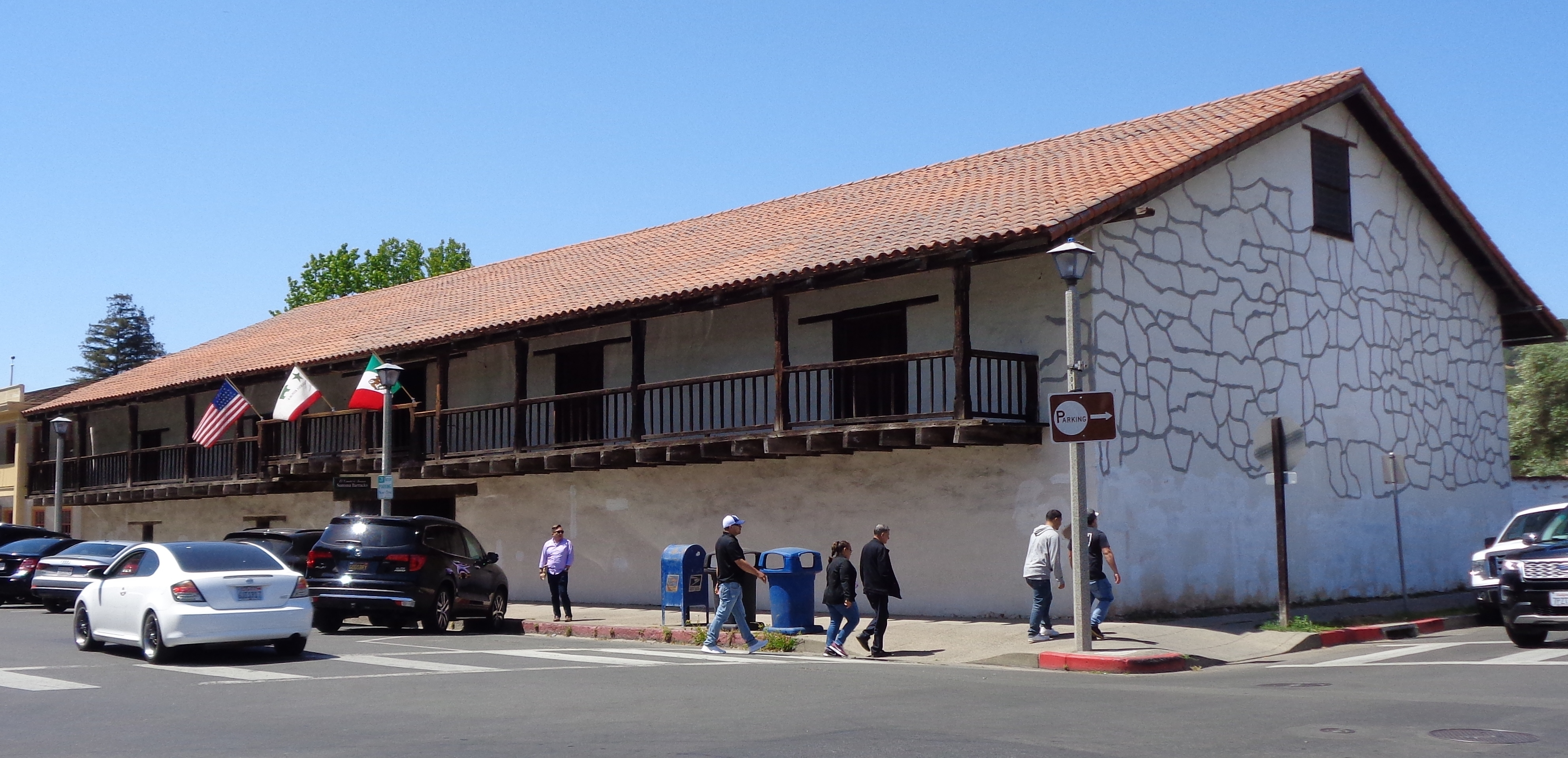
Sonoma Barracks, now part of Sonoma State Historic Park

The City of Sonoma was incorporated on September 3, 1883. It uses a council–manager form of government, wherein a council sets policy and hires staff to implement it. The city council has five members, elected to four-year terms. The city council selects one of its members to serve as mayor.

In addition to the official mayor, Sonoma has a tradition of naming an honorary mayor each year, titled "Alcalde/Alcaldesa". The Alcalde or Alcaldesa presides over ceremonial events for the city.

=== State and federal representation ===
In the California State Legislature, Sonoma is in the 3rd senatorial district, represented by Democrat Christopher Cabaldon, and in the 4th Assembly district, represented by Democrat Cecilia Aguiar-Curry.

In the United States House of Representatives, Sonoma is in California's 4th congressional district, represented by Democrat Mike Thompson.

According to the California Secretary of State, as of February 10, 2019, Sonoma has 7,162 registered voters. Of those, 3,694 (51.6%) are registered Democrats, 1,309 (18.3%) are registered Republicans, and 1,783 (24.9%) have declined to state a political party.

== Culture ==
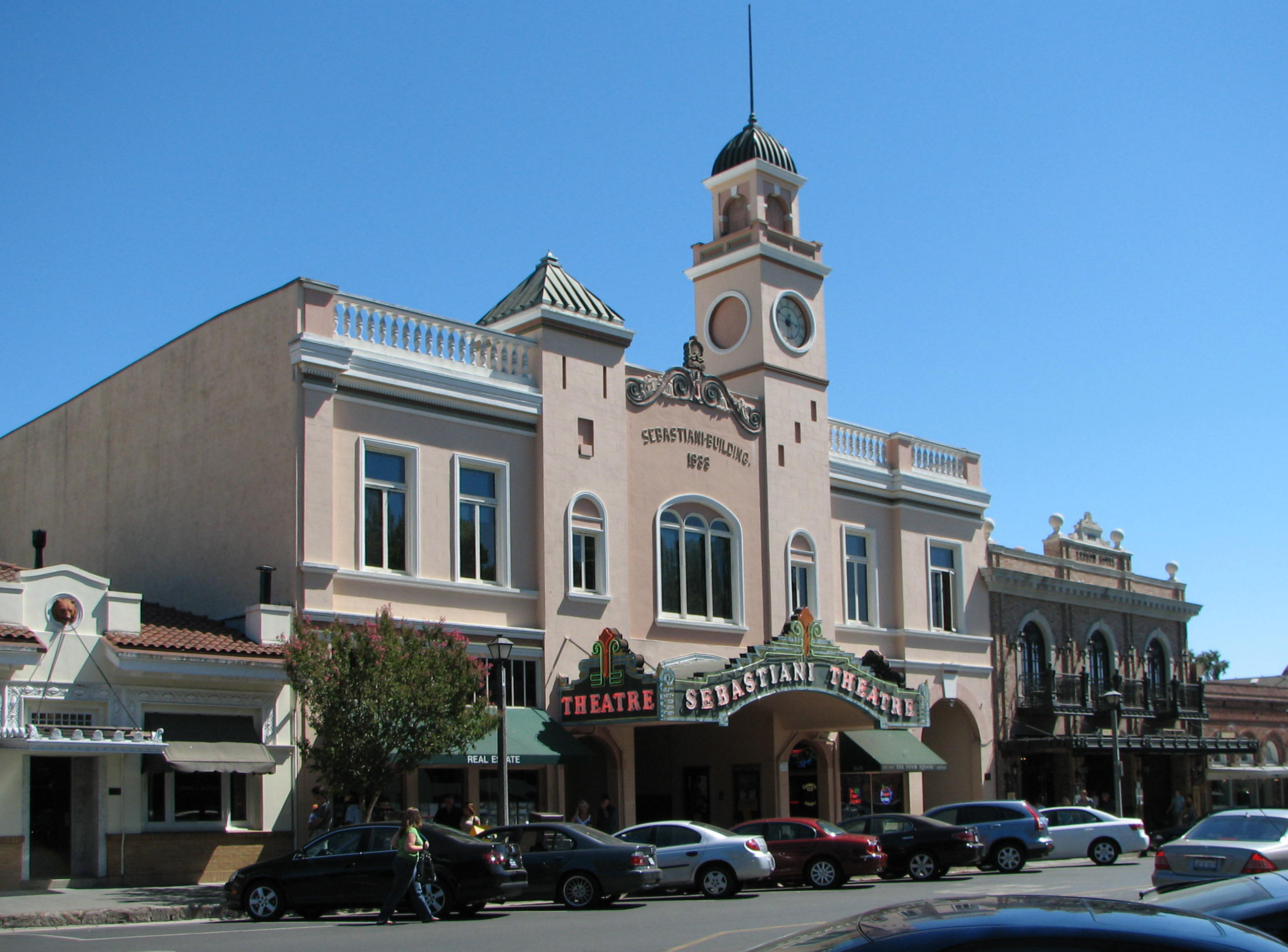
Sebastiani Theatre

The two primary news sources for Sonoma are the Sonoma Index-Tribune and the Sonoma Valley Sun. The Sonoma Index-Tribune publishes twice weekly on Wednesdays and Fridays and has a circulation of 9,000. The Sonoma Valley Sun publishes every other Thursday and is free. The Sun is recognized as the alternative weekly for the Sonoma Valley. It has a circulation of 5,000. Sonoma has a local radio station, KSVY, and a public-access television station, SVTV 27.

Sonoma Raceway is an motorsport racetrack opened in 1969, which currently hosts annual rounds of the NASCAR Cup Series, NASCAR O'Reilly Auto Parts Series, NHRA Mission Foods Drag Racing Series, GT World Challenge America and Sportscar Vintage Racing Association.

Apple's desktop operating system, macOS Sonoma, announced on June 5, 2023, during WWDC, is named after the city.

== Infrastructure ==
=== Transportation ===
California State Route 12 is the main route in Sonoma, passing through the populated areas of the Sonoma Valley and connecting it to Santa Rosa to the north and Napa to the east. State routes 121 and 116 run to the south of town, passing through the unincorporated area of Schellville and connecting Sonoma Valley to Napa, Petaluma to the west, and Marin County to the south. Sonoma County Transit provides bus service from Sonoma to other points in the county. VINE Transit also operates a route between Napa and Sonoma.

The nearest airport with regularly scheduled commercial passenger service is Charles M. Schulz–Sonoma County Airport, about 30 miles (50 km) northwest of Sonoma. San Francisco International Airport and Oakland International Airport are both about 60 miles (100 km) south of Sonoma. Airside shuttle service operated by Landline connects Charles M. Schulz–Sonoma County Airport and San Francisco International Airport.

Sonoma Valley Transit Buses are also available via the 30, 34, and 40 lines.

== Notable people ==
- Hap Arnold, first General of the United States Air Force
- Rod Beaton, journalist and media executive with United Press International
- Phil Coturri, viticulturalist who is recognized as a pioneer of organic and biodynamic farming
- Tommy Everidge, professional Major League Baseball player
- Kirk Hammett, lead guitarist of Metallica and songwriter
- Agoston Haraszthy, the "father of Californian wine"
- Joseph Hooker, politician and Civil War general
- John Lasseter, animator and former chief creative executive of Pixar
- Tony Moll, former NFL player
- Brian Posehn, comedian and actor
- Don Sebastiani, vintner and politician - Sebastiani Vineyards and Winery
- Tim Schafer, computer game designer and founder of Double Fine Productions
- William Smith, American Revolutionary War veteran believed to be buried in California
- Tom Smothers, comedian and musician
- David Ury, actor and comedian
- Mariano Guadalupe Vallejo, the last Mexican military commander of northern California
- Ignazio Vella, American businessman who served on the Sonoma County Board of Supervisors
- Sanford Weill, chairman of Citicorp during the 2008 financial crisis
- Chuck Williams, founder of Williams Sonoma
- Paula Wolfert and husband William Bayer, both authors, have been resident in Sonoma since 1998

== Sister cities ==
- Aswan, Egypt
- Chambolle-Musigny, France
- Greve in Chianti, Italy
- Kaniv, Ukraine
- Pátzcuaro, Mexico
- Penglai (Yantai), China
- Tokaj, Hungary

== See also ==
- Enos v. Snyder (1900)
- Swiss Hotel

== Bibliography ==
- Alexander, James B. (1986). Sonoma Valley Legacy. Sonoma, CA: Sonoma Valley Historical Society.
- Bancroft, Hubert Howe (1886). History of California Vol. II-V. The History Company, San Francisco, CA.
- CIMCC. "San Francisco de Solano - General Information". California Indian Museum and Cultural Center.
- Court of Claims (United States). "Mariano G Vallejo vs. The United States". Case 566.
- CSMM, The California State Military Museum. "Captain John Charles Fremont and the Bear Flag Revolt".
- Fremont, John Charles; Fremont, Jessie Benton (1887). Memoirs of My Life, Vol. 1. Belford, Clarke. ISBN 9780608422800.
- Hague, Harlan & David J. Langum Thomas O. Larkin: A Life of Patriotism and Profit in Old California, University of Oklahoma Press, (1990)
- Harlow, Neal California Conquered: The Annexation of a Mexican Province 1846–1850, ISBN 0-520-06605-7, (1982)
- Parmelee, Robert D (1972). Pioneer Sonoma. Sonoma, CA: The Sonoma Valley Historical Society.
- Richman, Irving B. (1911). California Under Spain and Mexico, 1535-1847. The Riverside Press, Cambridge. ISBN 9781404750784.
- Smilie, Robert A. (1975). The Sonoma Mission, San Francisco Solano de Sonoma: The Founding, Ruin and Restoration of California's 21st Mission. Valley Publishers, Fresno, CA. ISBN 978-0-913548-24-0.
- S/PSHPA - Sonoma/Petaluma State Historic Parks Association. "Mission San Francisco Solano". Archived from the original on August 3, 2017.
- SSHP. "Sonoma State Historic Park - A Short History of Historical Archaeology". California Department of Parks and Recreation.
- SSHP-GP. "Sonoma State Historic Park - General Plan" (PDF). California Department of Parks and Recreation.
- Stammerjohan, George. Sonoma Barracks, A Military View. Department of Parks and Recreation, State of California.
- Walker, Dale L. (1999). Bear Flag Rising: The Conquest of California, 1846. New York: Macmillan. ISBN 978-0312866853.
