= Renaissance Park =

Renaissance Park may refer to:

== Places in the United States ==
Ordered by state name, then by city name

- Renaissance Park, Greenwood, Florida, a site on the Florida Black Heritage Trail
- Renaissance Park (Atlanta), in Georgia
- Central State Hospital (Milledgeville, Georgia) Re-Development Authority & Rennaissance Park
- Renaissance Park, Peoria, Illinois
- Renaissance Park, in Polk County, Iowa
- Renaissance Park Garage, in Boston, Massachusetts, next to the Interdisciplinary Science and Engineering Complex
- Renaissance Park (Charlotte, North Carolina) — https://web.archive.org/web/20190112042149/http://charmeck.org/mecklenburg/county/ParkandRec/Parks/ParksByRegion/SouthRegion/Pages/RenaissancePK.aspx
- Renaissance Park, a neighborhood in South Raleigh, North Carolina
- Renaissance Park at Geauga Lake, an amusement park in Bainbridge Township and Aurora, Ohio
- Renaissance Park, the site of the Bellwether Music Festival at which Soft Sounds from Another Planet toured, in Waynesville, Ohio
- Point State Park, Pittsburgh, Pennsylvania, US
- Renaissance Park, Chattanooga, Tennessee, designed by George Hargreaves, a stop on the North Shore Shuttle bus route of the Chattanooga Area Regional Transportation Authority, and the site of multiple protests, such as Families Belong Together in 2018, and Women's March in 2021 — see also Tennessee Riverwalk
- Renaissance Park Multi Care Center, Benbrook, Texas, US

== Places elsewhere ==
Ordered by country name

- Renaissance Park, near Centro Memoria (TransMilenio), Bogotá, Colombia
- Bedale Renaissance Park, the site of the Bedale Leech House, Bedale, North Yorkshire, England
- Parco della Rinascita, Baronissi, Italy
