= Sonoma historic landmarks =

Significant city sites in California

The city of Sonoma, California has established about 90 sites to represent the significant historic sites and structures.

Separate from the city's list, state and federal government agencies have identified landmarks in the city. Some sites overlap the city's list and others are separate.

== List of Sonoma Historic Landmarks ==
Address Number	Street	Historic Name	Location	Image	Year built	Architectural Style	NRS Number	State Property #	Architectural Style	California Historical Landmark Number	Federal Recognition	Site Location & Other Comments	APN
291	1st St. E	Poultry Production of California Warehouse #2 (at Depot Park)	38.295599°N 122.456243°W		1914	Wood Frame Warehouse	1D	00156	Wood Frame Warehouse		Reported no longer in existence as of 2018.		018-131-006
291	1st St. E	Railroad Depot / Depot Museum	38.295599°N 122.456243°W		1860	Railroad Depot Wood Building	1S	004165	Railroad Depot Wood Building				018-131-006
389	1st St. E	The Barracks (Cuartel de Sonoma)	38.293726°N 122.456634°W		1836	Spanish Colonial	1D	004121	Spanish Colonial			Actual street and situs address is 36 East Spain	018-162-014
400	1st St. E	Old Sonoma Creamery / Vella Cheese Factory	38.293409°N 122.456157°W		1930-S, 1926-L	Mission Revival	1D	004170	Mission Revival				018-221-001
408	1st St. E	Valentine/Building C			1916	Stone Commercial	2D3	004171	Stone Commercial				018-221-035
414	1st St. E	El Paseo De Sonoma/Buildings A, B and D			1891	Brick, stone, wood and stucco	2D3	087431	Brick, stone, wood and stucco				018-221-035
414	1st St. E	Vasquez House (relocated from 541 1st St. W)	38.293229°N 122.456249°W		1850		1D	004139					018-221-035
420	1st St. E	Cantoni's Bakery / Building E	38.293070°N 122.456338°W		1912	Brick Commercial	2D3	004172	Brick Commercial				018-221-035
453	1st St. E	Carnegie Public Library	38.292683°N 122.457009°W		1913	Neo-classical	1D	004164	Neo-classical				018-214-001
488	1st St. E	Grinstead Building / Parmelee Building	38.291914°N 122.456494°W		1911	Spanish Colonial	1D	004173	Spanish Colonial				018-221-013
482	1st St. E	Italianate Commercial Building	38.292242°N 122.456483°W		1933	Italianate style	1D	087432	Italianate style				018-221-042
484	1st St. E	Italianate Commercial Building			1900	Italianate style	1D	087433	Italianate style				018-221-029
498	1st St. E	Duhring General Store	38.291852°N 122.456531°W		1870/1891-S, 1891-L	Italianate False Front	1D	004154	Italianate False Front				018-221-015
525	1st St. E	First Library			1900	Gabled Roof	1D	004278	Gabled Roof				015-212-025
542	1st St. E	First Methodist Episcopal church			1850	Gothic Revival	1D	004148	Gothic Revival				018-261-031
564	1st St. E	Julius Poppe House			1850	Carpenter Gothic Cottage	1D	004147	Carpenter Gothic Cottage				018-261-013
567	1st St. E				1915-S, 1910-L	Hip Roof	1D	087435	Hip Roof				018-212-026
579	1st St. E	Nash-Patten Adobe			1847	Adobe		004146	Adobe				018-212-020
415	1st St. W	Salvadore Vallejo Adobe			1836	Mexican Colonical		004131	Mexican Colonical		Salvadore Vallejo Adobe, Mexican Colonial Revival adobe		018-202-069
437	2nd St. W	Camille Aguillon Building / Ruggles			1875	False Front building		004132	False Front building		Camille Aguillion Building (Ruggles): Formerly a Chinese laundry and employment office for Chinese immigrants. The building was purchased by French expatriate Camille Aguillon in the 1800s for his winery.		018-202-072
447	3rd St. W	Camille Aquillon building / Chinese Laundry			1860	2-Story Gabled Roof		004133	2-Story Gabled Roof			Listed in County record and street map as 445 First Street W	018-202-073
453	4th St. W	Batto Building			1912	Classic Revival		004134	Classic Revival				018-202-070
467-469(465)	5th St. W	Masonic Building, Temple No. 14			1909	Italian Renaissance		004135	Italian Renaissance			Listed in County record and street map as 495 First Street W	081-202-075
481	6th St. W	Bear Flag Realty			1890	Italianate False Front		004209	Italianate False Front				018-202-059
483	7th St. W	Italianate-False Front Commercial Building			1890	Italianate False Front		087439	Italianate False Front				018-202-015
487	8th St. W	Leese-Fitch Adobe			1836	Monterey Colonical		004136	Monterey Colonical			Located on the north side of the site, County and street map list this site as 495 First Street W	018-202-015
unk	2nd St. E & E. Napa St. south of intersection	Stone Bridge at Nathanson Creek			1909	Street Feature	2S2	004265	Street Feature			Located at the northeast edge of site.	018-261-008
531	2nd. St. E	William Clewe Residence			1876	Italianate	1D	004152	Italianate			Located in the center of the site.	018-261-008
532	2nd. St. E	Duhring Home / Pine Lodge			1859	Colonial Revival	1D	004153	Colonial Revival				018-262-014
553	2nd. St. E	William Clewe House			1915	Shingled Bungalow	1D	004264	Shingled Bungalow				018-261-012
558	2nd. St. E	Lutgens House			1910	Shingled Bungalow	1D	004263	Shingled Bungalow				018-262-002
521	Broadway	I.O.O.F. Building			1911-S, 1900-L	2-Story Brick Building	1D	004246	2-Story Brick Building				018-211-003
526	Broadway	Marcy & Clark Building			1870	Italianate False Front	1D	004143	Italianate False Front				018-810-016
530	Broadway	Marcy & Clark Building			1880	Italianate False Front	1D	087411	Italianate False Front				018-810-017
536	Broadway	Dunbar Hardware Store / Sonoma Service Building			1910	Two-Story Commercial	1D	004145	Two-Story Commercial				018-810-018
548	Broadway	One-story shiplap siding residence			1870	Greek Revival	1D	087412	Greek Revival				018-810-021
578	Broadway	Harold Holz Residence			1880	Queen Anne	1D	004249	Queen Anne				018-212-019
124	Church St.	One-story bungalow			unk	Stucco walls / Mission tile cross-gable roof	1D	087414	Stucco walls / Mission tile cross-gable roof				018-202-076
15	E. Napa St.	One-story commercial building			1917-S, 1915-1920-N		1D	087415			Church Mouse building on National Register as "a one-story Mission Revival commercial building"		018-212-004
25	E. Napa St.	One-story commercial building			1910-S,1910-1915-N	Glazed brick building with Mission tile pent roof	1D	087416	Glazed brick building with Mission tile pent roof				018-810-032
29	E. Napa St.	Simmons Pharmacy			1900	Spanish	1D	087417	Spanish				018-810-037
101	E. Napa St.	Post Office / General Store / Boccoli Building			1896	Basalt stone building, built from local quarries in an Italian commercial theme; faced with metal, embossed to resemble stone	1D	004266	Basalt stone building, built from local quarries in an Italian commercial theme; faced with metal, embossed to resemble stone		Boccoli Building; local grocers, the Boccoli family constructed this building that served as Sonoma's Post Office	Listed in County record as 103 East Napa Street	018-261-001
107	E. Napa St.	C. Dal Paggetto Building			1908	Italianate style with rusticated ashlar basalt façade	1D	004267	Italianate style with rusticated ashlar basalt façade		Del Poggetto Building; Charles Dal Poggetto was a businessman who used the building for his barber shop and for the area's hospital facility.	Located on the west side of the street.	018-261-002
111-A & B	E. Napa St.	C. Dal Paggetto Building-1908			1908-S	Italianate commercial building built of locally-quarried basalt	1D	004149	Italianate commercial building built of locally-quarried basalt			Located on the east side of the site: listed in County record as 107 East Napa Street	018-261-002
113	E. Napa St.	C. Dal Paggetto Building			1908	Italianate	1D	004269	Italianate			Located on the east side of the site: listed in County record as 107 East Napa Street	018-261-002
127	E. Napa St.	A. Castex Building			1904	italianate	1D	087418	italianate			Located at center of site	018-261-037
129	E. Napa St.	A. Castex Building			1904	Italianate	1D	004150	Italianate			Located on east side of site; listed with 127 East Napa Street in County record.	018-261-037
139	E. Napa St.	Eastlake Style House			1880	Eastlake style built with clapboard siding and a cross-gable roof	1D	004151	Eastlake style built with clapboard siding and a cross-gable roof				018-261-005
146	E. Napa St.	Former garage			1910	Tin false front	1D	087419	Tin false front			Also includes 140 East Napa Street per street map.	018-221-017
151	E. Napa St.	Small's Home			1900	Gabled roof	1D	004273	Gabled roof				018-261-023
156	E. Napa St.	La Torres Home			1910	Hip roof box	1D	004202	Hip roof box				018-221-037
161	E. Napa St.	Small's Home			1910	California bungalow	1D	087420	California bungalow				018-261-024
168	E. Napa St.	Granice Home / Morning Glory Villas			1880	Queen Anne, best example of Stick Eastlake Victorian residence in Sonoma.	1D	004203	Queen Anne, best example of Stick Eastlake Victorian residence in Sonoma.		H. H. Grancie, founder of the Sonoma Index Tribune, started the paper on his residential property in the early 1880s. This home was originally located at 157 East Napa and was moved to 168 East Napa when the site was developed in 2003.		018-221-039
180	E. Napa St.	Millie Bates Home			1870	Hip roof rect	1D	004201	Hip roof rect				018-221-020
276	E. Napa St.	Sonoma Grammar School			1916	Roman Classic	1S	004197	Roman Classic				018-222-017
20	E. Spain St.	Water Tower			1900		1D	087423				See building footprint map for location; listed as 10 East Spain Street in the County record and on the street map	018-162-021
20	E. Spain St.	Casa Grande Indian Quarters / Servants Quarters			1835	Spanish Colonial	1D	004126	Spanish Colonial			See building footprint map for location; listed as 10 East Spain Street in the County record and on the street map	018-162-021
20	E. Spain St.	Toscano Hotel / Captain Leiding Store			1858	Early Californian	1D	004122	Early Californian			See building footprint map for location; listed as 24 East Spain Street in the County record and on the street map	018-162-021
20	E. Spain St.	Toscano Hotel Dining Hall & Kitchen			1902	Early Californian	1D	004122	Early Californian			See building footprint map for location; listed as 24 East Spain Street in the County record and on the street map	018-162-021
20	E. Spain St.	Toscano Hotel Annex			1870	Greek revival two-story	1D	004124	Greek revival two-story			See building footprint map for location.	018-162-021
114	E. Spain St.	Convento Wing			1824	Mission church	1D	087427	Mission church		The original Mission chapel of palizado construction covered with mud stucco and tile thatch roof	Original building located on east side of site; listed as 140 East Spain street in the County record	018-171-007
114	E. Spain St.	Mission San Francisco De Solano	38.293822°N 122.456116°W		1840	Mission	1D	004158	Mission		Adobe Mission church erected to serve as the area's parish church.	Entire site place point at center of site; listed as 140 East Spain Street in the County record	018-171-007
130	E. Spain St.	Solomon Schocken House			1886	Hip roof cottage	1D	004176	Hip roof cottage				018-171-008
133	E. Spain St.	Blue Wing Inn	38.2934°N 122.4556°W		1840	Monterey Colonial	1D	004157	Monterey Colonial			Listed in the County record as 131 East Spain Street in the County record	018-221-003
146	E. Spain St.	Schocken House			1886	Hip roof cottage	1D	004177	Hip roof cottage				018-171-010
147	E. Spain St.	Pinni / Black House			1906	Rubble cottage	1D	004178	Rubble cottage			Listed as 129 East Spain Street in the County record	018-221-004
165	E. Spain St.	Pinelli Property			1922		1D	087428				Location at east side of site	018-221-005
150	E. Spain St.	Castagnasso Farm			1890	rural property	1D	004180	rural property			Location at west side of site	018-171-011
196	E. Spain St.	Castagnasso Farm			1890	Gambrel roof	1D	004180	Gambrel roof			Location at southeast side of site; also listed as 154 East Spain in County Record	018-171-012
205	E. Spain St.	John Ray / Adler Adobe			1848	Spanish Colonial	1D	004160	Spanish Colonial				018-222-001
206	E. Spain St.	Winkle Home			1902	Hop Roof Box	1D	004181	Hop Roof Box				018-172-004
220	E. Spain St.	Adam Adler Home			1910	California bungalow	1D	004182	California bungalow				018-172-005
227	E. Spain St.	Gaese / Fowler Residence			1900	Gabled roof	1D	004183	Gabled roof				018-222-019
245	E. Spain St.	Cooke / Dr. Clark Taylor House			1857	Monterey Colonial	1D	004161	Monterey Colonial				018-222-013
256	E. Spain St.	Lewis Adler's First House / Castagnasso House			1848-S, 1899-C	Gabled roof box	1D	004162	Gabled roof box				018-560-026
18	W. Spain St.	The Swiss Hotel / Salvador Vallejo Adobe (Casa Grande)			1850-S, 1840-L	Spanish Colonial	1D	087421	Spanish Colonial			Per County records, site listed as 38 East Spain	018-162-020
30	W. Spain St.	Cuneo / Sebastiani Apartments			1938-S, 1937-L	Spanish Revival	1D	087424	Spanish Revival			Per County records, site listed as 50 East Spain	018-162-026
38	W. Spain St.	Sebastiani Depot			1939	Spanish Colonial	1D	087426	Spanish Colonial			Per County records, site listed as 40 West Spain.	018-162-028
110	W. Spain St.	Old Sonoma / Sebastiani Plaza Hotel			1872, 1979 per newspaper clipping from the era	3-story adobe / stucco	1D	004128	3-story adobe / stucco			Location at southeast edge of site.	018-161-040
143	W. Spain St.	La Casa, Castanada / Jones Adobe			1836	Adobe	1D	004129	Adobe				018-202-025
300	W. Spain St.	Vallejo Estate / General Vallejo's Home "Lachryma Montis"			1851	Gothic Revival	1S	004223	Gothic Revival				018-061-002
796	W. Spain St.	Hanson Hatchery			1924	Espanda / Mission	2B4	004221	Espanda / Mission				127-204-005
796	W. Spain St.	Hanson Hatchery Historic District			1921		2S2	080476					127-204-005
800	W. Spain St.	Hanson Hatchery Garage			1921		2D2	080483					127-204-022
800	W. Spain St.	Hanson Hatchery Tank House			1921		2D2	080481					127-204-022
800	W. Spain St.	Hanson Hatchery Residence			1921	1-story bungalow	2D2	080477	1-story bungalow				127-204-022
800	W. Spain St.	Hanson Hatchery (Little Hatchery)			1921		2D2	080482					127-204-022
Number 1	The Plaza	Military Parage grounds / Sonoma Plaza			n/a	open space park	1S	004163	open space park				018-214-001
Number 1	The Plaza	Sonoma City Hall			1906	Mission Revival-stone masonry building	1D	004137	Mission Revival-stone masonry building				018-214-001
Number 1	The Plaza	California Bear Flag Monument and Flagstaff			1913	Stone and brass monument with flagstaff	1D	004138	Stone and brass monument with flagstaff				018-214-001
605	Verano Ave.	Warwick Farmstead District			1910		2D2	089313					127-511-083
605	Verano Ave.	Warwick Barn			1910		2D2	089314					127-511-083
605	Verano Ave.	Warwick Water Tankhouse			1910		2D2	089315					127-511-083
605	Verano Ave.	Warwich Farmhands House			1890	bungalow	2D2	089323	bungalow				127-511-083

== See also ==
- List of National Historic Landmarks in California
- California Historical Landmarks in Sonoma County, California
- List of Landmarks in unincorporated Sonoma County
