= 2021 Women's March =

2021 demonstration in the United States

- Part of the Women's rights movement
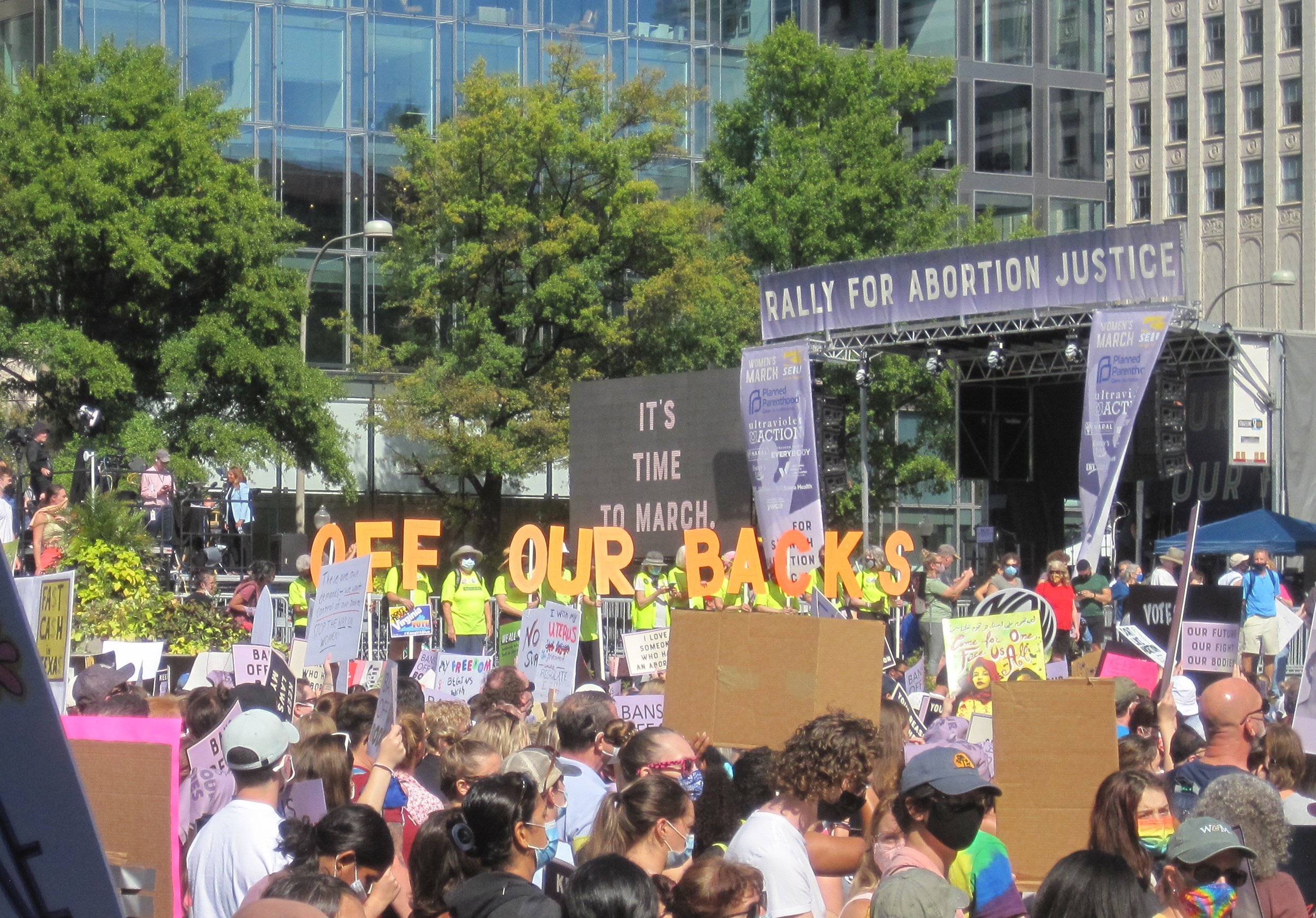
- Date: October 2, 2021
- Location: United States
- Methods: Protest march

A women's march was held on October 2, 2021, in protest of a recent abortion law in the U.S. state of Texas, the Texas Heartbeat Act. The demonstration was announced on September 2. More than 90 organizations participated. Although organizers of the Washington, D.C. march applied for a permit for 10,000 people, actual attendance was around 5,000.

== Participation ==
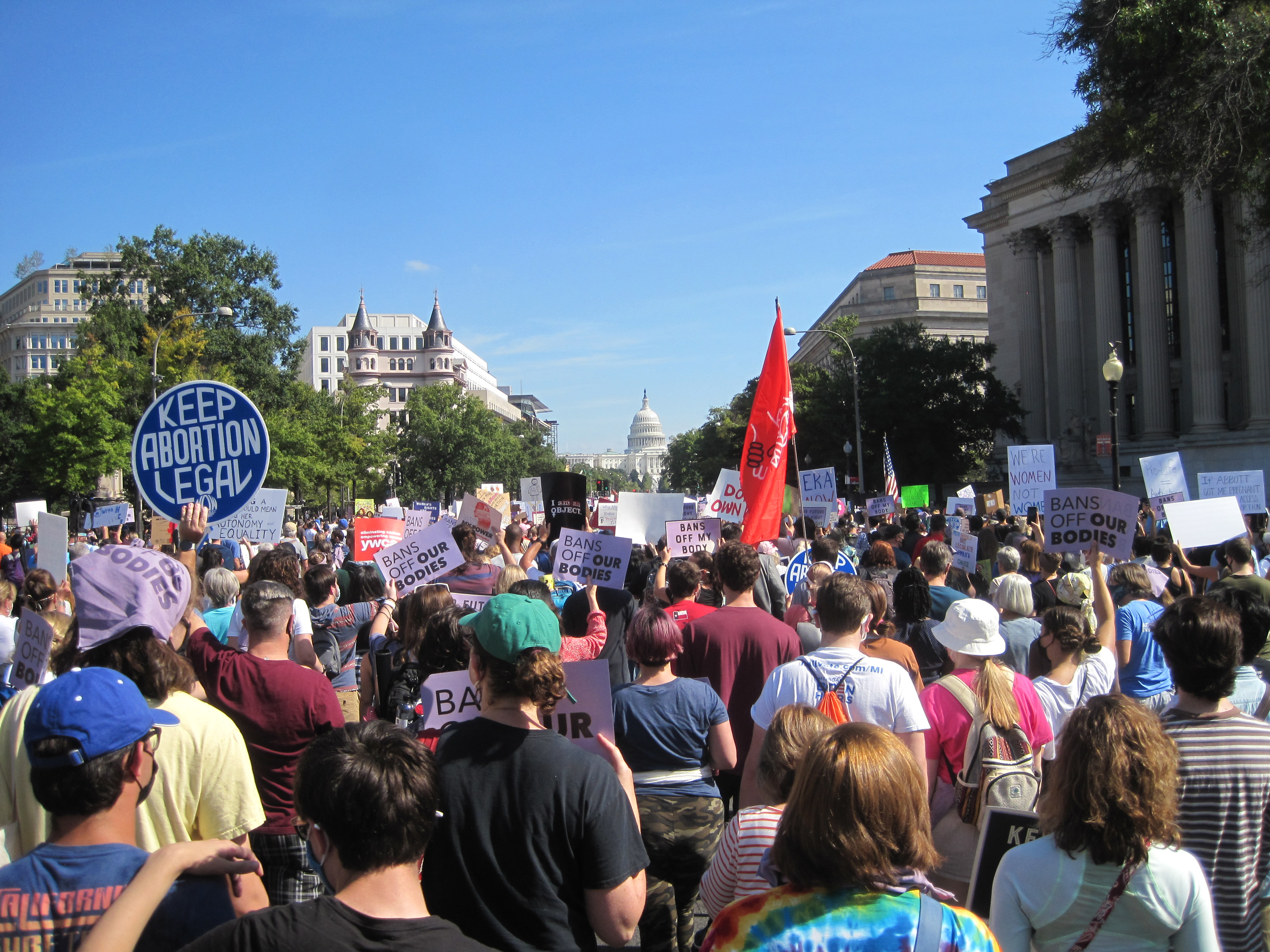
October 2021 Women's March in Washington, D.C.

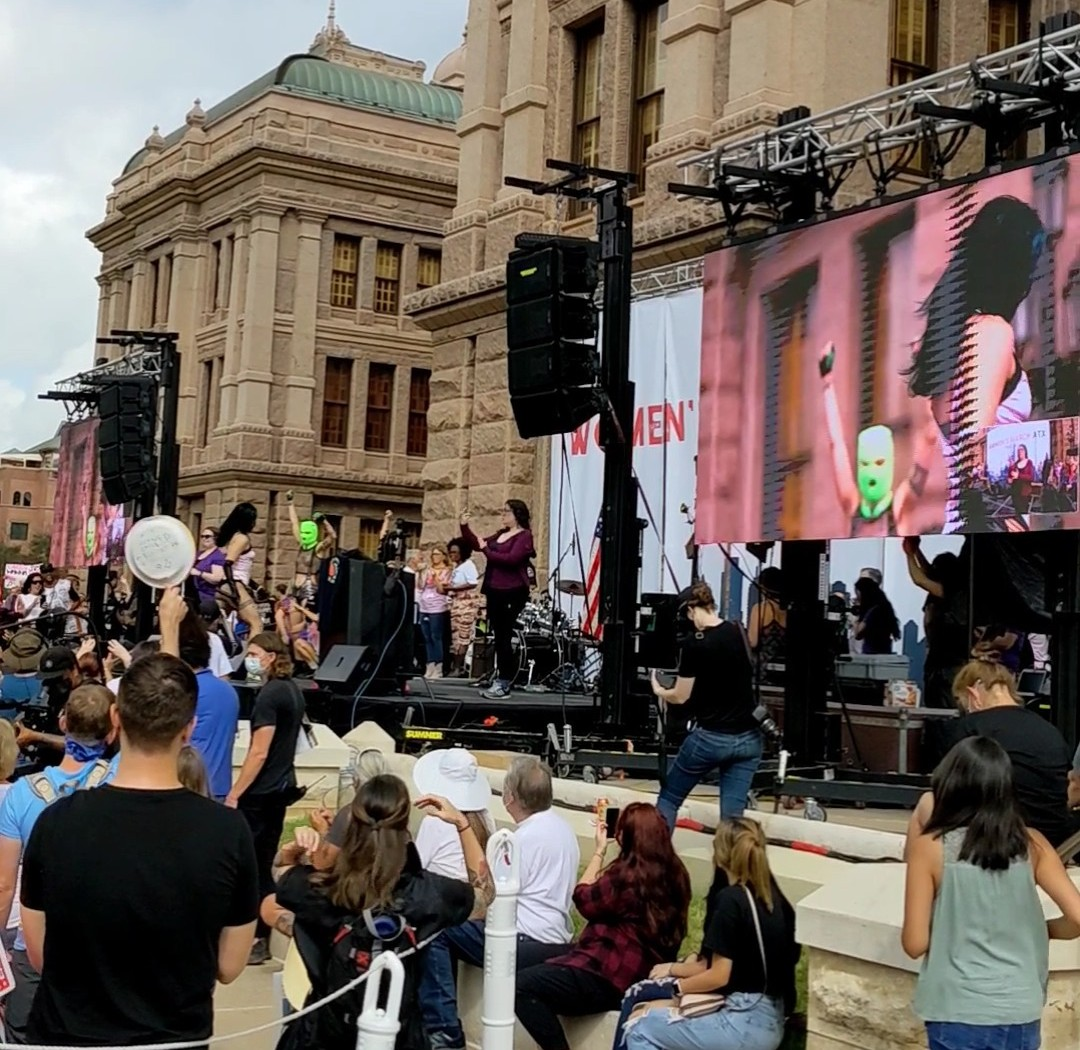
The band Pussy Riot performing in the rally at the Texas Capitol in Austin

Roughly 5,000 attendees in Washington D.C. met in Freedom Plaza and marched to the United States Supreme Court Building. Speakers at the rally included Cristela Alonzo, Schuyler Bailar, activist Monica Simpson, and Planned Parenthood president Alexis McGill Johnson.

Several cities in Texas held events. In Austin thousands gathered on the lawn of the Texas Capitol building, where speakers included Cecile Richards, a Texan and former president of Planned Parenthood.

Marches also took place in New York, Chicago and Los Angeles.

Some attendees wore t-shirts with "1973" printed on them, which is the year of the Roe v. Wade court decision that legalized abortion throughout the United States. Many speakers warned of a looming threat to this court decision.

== See also ==
- List of 2021 Women's March locations
