= List of 2021 Women's March locations =

In protest of a recent abortion law in Texas, the 2021 Women's March took place in all 50 US states on Saturday, October 2, 2021, two days before the United States Supreme Court began its upcoming term on Monday, October 4.

== United States ==
Listed below are over 700 events in the U.S. in support of the 2021 Women's March

- AL
- AK
- AZ
- AR
- CA
- CO
- CT
- DE
- DC
- FL
- GA
- HI
- ID
- IL
- IN
- IA
- KS
- KY
- LA
- ME
- MD
- MA
- MI
- MN
- MS
- MO
- MT
- NE
- NV
- NH
- NJ
- NM
- NY
- NC
- ND
- OH
- OK
- OR
- PA
- RI
- SC
- SD
- TN
- TX
- UT
- VT
- VA
- WA
- WV
- WI
- WY

States	Cities	Photo	Approximate attendance	Location(s)/Notes
Washington, D.C.			5,000 - 10,000	Thousands of supporters for reproductive freedom (some of whom had traveled from states away) gathered at Freedom Plaza before marching down to the Supreme Court Building. Celebrity participants included actors Amy Schumer & Jennifer Lawrence. A group of anti-abortion activists, Students for Life of America, also stood along the same route on the opposite side of Pennsylvania Ave.
Alabama	Anniston		50	sidewalk march from 8th to 12th Street / Federal Court House, 812 Noble St
Alabama	Auburn		17	Toomer's Corner Sit-In hosted a women's event; people gathered at Toomer's Corner Saturday evening and were able to converse with one another for about an hour before the group marched around Samford Hall and made a loop back to Toomer's Corner.
Alabama	Birmingham		almost 1,000	Linn Park - Birmingham City Call, federal courthouse & Jefferson County Courthouse
Alabama	Daphne		TBD	Daphne City Hall - Daphne Civic Center
Alabama	Dothan		TBD	rally held outside Houston County Courthouse
Alabama	Florence			event planned at Wilson Park, 223 East Tuscaloosa St
Alabama	Huntsville		400	St. John AME Church - Madison County Courthouse
Alabama	Mobile		30	Spanish Plaza Park - Mobile County Probate Court House
Alabama	Montgomery		30	rally and march held at Montgomery Fountain downtown, Dexter Avenue
Alaska	Anchorage		150+	rally held at Delaney Park Strip
Alaska	Bethel			event planned at Yupiit Piciryarait Cultural Center (YPCC) parking lot
Alaska	Fairbanks		25+	Despite continuous snowfall, an event was held at Taku Parking Lot (UAF campus, off Farmer's Loop Rd) that included speakers and a car parade; a group of counter-protesters also showed up.
Alaska	Homer		100-130	rally at HERC Campus; march to WKFL Park
Alaska	Juneau		111	Rainy weather on Saturday, October 2 forced a rescheduling of one event at the Alaska State Capitol and cancellation of another at The Whale Project on Harris Harbor Way; a handful of people showed up at both locations anyway. On Monday, October 4, an official rally of 100 took place at Court Plaza near the William H. Seward statue. Speakers included former Democratic state Rep Les Gara, now running for Governor, and Heidi Drygas, running mate of former Independent Gov. Bill Walker, now campaigning for a second term.
Alaska	Ketchikan			event planned at "The Rock," Berth 2, Tongass Avenue
Alaska	Kodiak			event planned at Kodiak High School Auditorium parking lot
Alaska	Palmer			event planned at Palmer City Hall
Alaska	Petersburg			(Mon, Oct 4) event planned at Buschmann Park
Alaska	Seward		12	march from Rae Building lawn into downtown Seward
Alaska	Sitka			event planned at Totem Square, 200 Katlian St.
Alaska	Soldotna		50	Soldotna Sports Center - Soldotna Creek Park. 15 counter-protesters greeted the marchers along Sterling Highway.
Alaska	Utqiagvik		12	march held at Brower's Cafe (Point Barrow Refuge Station), near the Whale Bone Arch
Alaska	Valdez			event planned at Valdez City Hall
Arizona	Casa Grande			event planned at City Hall
Arizona	Flagstaff		300	Several hundred people, half of whom marched through Flagstaff from the campus of Northern Arizona University, rallied at Flagstaff City Hall Lawn.
Arizona	Green Valley		30-35	corner of Esperanza & La Canada
Arizona	Kingman		12+	Mohave County Rally for Women's Rights held at Firefighter's Memorial Park
Arizona	Mesa		100-150	sign-holding protesters lined the sidewalks of Main St, outside Mesa Courthouse, Mesa Police Station, Mesa Arts Center, several museums and businesses.
Arizona	Payson		27	A sign-holding protest was held along the sidewalks fronting the intersection of Hwys 87 & 260, outside McDonald's and The Beverage Place parking lot.
Arizona	Phoenix		2,000 - 3,000	(Sat, Oct 2) Thousands gathered for a rally and march around the Arizona State Capitol Building; counter-protesters were also present. / (Sun, Oct 3) a candlelight vigil for Rosaura "Rosie" Jiménez was held at First Church UCC Phoenix.
Arizona	Prescott		few dozen	rally & march held at Granite Creek Park
Arizona	Scottsdale			event planned at Scottsdale City Hall
Arizona	Sedona			event planned at Corner Democracy, 89A and Coffeepot Drive
Arizona	Tuba City			event planned at Trading Post parking lot area, Main St
Arizona	Tucson		2,000+	Armory Park - Jacome Plaza
Arkansas	Bentonville			event planned at Bentonville City Square
Arkansas	Fayetteville		400+	rally & march held at Fayetteville Town Square
Arkansas	Fort Smith		150	rally held at County Courthouse, Garrison Avenue
Arkansas	Jonesboro		60-80	march through downtown, starting at City Hall and ending at the Rotary Club of Jonesboro Centennial Plaza for a rally
Arkansas	Little Rock		nearly 500	rally held on the steps of Arkansas State Capitol. State Senator Joyce Elliott & state Rep Jamie Scott spoke at the event.
Arkansas	Mountain Home		60-70	rally at Baxter County Courthouse Square - march to intersection of US Highway 62/412 & state Highway 5 N
California	Alameda		200	Washington Park - Alameda City Hall
California	Anaheim			virtual event planned: "Raise Your Voice for Freedom of Choice"
California	Bakersfield		100+	Kern County Veterans Memorial - Liberty Bell
California	Beaumont		dozens	rally held at intersection of Oak Valley Parkway and Beaumont Ave
California	Beverly Hills		300	rally held at Beverly Gardens Park, Santa Monica Blvd. Speakers included Beverly Hills Mayor Robert Wunderlich and attorney Gloria Allred.
California	Big Sur			event planned at Gem Cove
California	California City			march planned: City Hall - Central Park
California	Cambria			event planned at Peace Corner, Main Street and Cambria Drive
California	Carlsbad		couple hundred	march held at Holiday Park, 1055 Chestnut Avenue
California	Castro Valley			event planned at Castro Valley Blvd and Redwood Road intersection
California	Chico		50+	Women's March Chico joined up with the Chico Peace Endeavor Vigil at City Plaza, then marched through downtown Chico; a car and bike caravan also took place.
California	Claremont		150+	(Sun, Oct 3) intersection of Foothill Blvd and Indian Hill Blvd - Memorial Park
California	Crescent City			event planned at Del Norte County Courthouse
California	Danville		60-100	rally at Danville Green, in front of Danville Library - march through downtown
California	El Cerrito		80-120	Central Park - El Cerrito Plaza
California	Eureka		350	Demonstrators occupied the steps of the Humboldt County Courthouse
California	Fairfax			sign holding event planned at Fairfax Parkade
California	Folsom		60+	rally held at Folsom City Hall
California	Fort Bragg			event planned at Town Hall, Main & Laurel Streets
California	Fountain Valley		hundreds	Mile Square Park
California	Fresno		500	A vigil was held at Blackstone Avenue and Nees Avenue, near the River Park Shopping Center.
California	Fullerton		240+	Hundreds gathered outside North Justice Center and marched down Harbor Boulevard.
California	Granite Bay			event planned at Douglas Blvd and Sierra College intersection
California	Half Moon Bay			event planned at Mac Dutra Park
California	Healdsburg			event planned at Healdsburg Plaza
California	Hermosa Beach			event planned at Hermosa Beach Pier, Pier Avenue at Sepulveda Blvd
California	Hollister		dozen	rally outside San Benito County Superior Court
California	Idyllwild			event planned at Center of Town Flag Pole
California	Irvine		500	four-corner rally at intersection of Alton Pkwy & Culver Dr
California	Julian			event planned at Pioneer Park
California	Laguna Beach		400	Main Beach, corner of Broadway and Coast Highway. Assemblywoman Cottie Petrie-Norris joined in the protest.
California	Laguna Woods		TBD	street rally held at El Toro Road, near Laguna Woods City Hall
California	Lakeport			(Fri, Oct 1) event planned at Lake County Courthouse
California	Long Beach		200	Governor George Deukmejian Courthouse - Harvey Milk Promenade Park
California	Los Angeles		20,000	Thousands gathered at Pershing Square and marched to L.A. City Hall. Speakers included attorney Gloria Allred, journalist & former California first lady Maria Shriver, & actors Alyssa Milano, Christine Lahti, Debbie Allen, Raven-Symoné and sisters Rosanna & Patricia Arquette.
California	Malibu		18	Malibu locals stood near the intersection of Pacific Coast Highway (State Route 1) & Webb Way, holding signs as cars passed by.
California	Martinez		~50	Susana Park, Estudillo St - City Hall
California	Modesto		100	rally at Graceada Park (near Mancini Bowl), followed by march around adjacent Graceada and Enslen parks.
California	Monterey		500	rally & march held at Window on the Bay Park Seaside Mayor Ian Oglesby took part in the event.
California	Mount Shasta			event planned at Parker Plaza
California	Mountain View		500	El Camino & Castro Streets - Mountain View City Hall Plaza. State Sen. Josh Becker was present.
California	Napa		250-300	rally at Veterans Memorial Park (march not included). Napa Mayor Scott Sedgley spoke at the rally.
California	Nevada City			event planned at Robinson Plaza
California	North Hollywood		30+	San Fernando Valley Women's March started with a rally near Ross Allen Lumber on Vineland Ave, with a speech given by US Congressional candidate Angelica Dueñas. People then marched down NoHo Metro Station towards Tujunga Ave.
California	Oakland			virtual event planned
California	Oceanside			event planned at Oceanside City Hall
California	Ojai			event planned at Libby Park
California	Ontario			event planned near City Hall and Ontario Town Square
California	Orinda		100-150	Downtown Orinda Theatre - City Hall
California	Pacifica			event planned at Pacifica State Beach
California	Pasadena		hundreds	Instead of a march, Pasadena held a "Caravan for Choice," in which people could travel by car or bike from the Rosebowl to Centennial Square outside Pasadena City Hall, with supporters on the sidewalks cheering them on. Elected officials present at the rally to greet the riders included Pasadena Mayor Victor Gordo, US Rep Judy Chu, State Senator Anthony Portantino and Councilmember Steve Madison.
California	Point Reyes Station		50+	protest held in front of the Wells Fargo Bank on the main drag
California	Poway			event planned at intersection of Pomerado Rd & Twin Peaks Rd
California	Quincy		200+	rally & march at Plumas County Courthouse
California	Redding		several dozen	rally at Riverfront Park
California	Redlands			march planned: Redlands City Hall - downtown Historic Redlands
California	Redondo Beach		couple hundred	Hundreds gathered at Veterans Park, south end of the Esplanade, then marched south on Catalina. State Assemblyman Al Muratsuchi (D-Torrance) was a speaker and marcher; Torrance Mayor Pat Furey also participated.
California	Redwood City		150	(Sun, Oct 3) four-corner rally held at intersection of El Camino Real & Jefferson Ave; event hosted by the Raging Grannies
California	Riverside		thousands	Inland Empire March for Reproductive Rights began with a rally at Riverside City Hall, and ran through downtown; at Main Street Mall, marchers were serenaded by the Riverside Resistance Revival Chorus.
California	Roseville			event planned at Planned Parenthood Roseville
California	Sacramento		60+	A COVID-safe virtual rally and car caravan was held, starting at the Amtrak parking lot at 5th and I Street, cruising by the US Courthouse & Federal Building and ending at the California State Capitol.
California	San Diego		thousands	A massive rally took place at Waterfront Park, followed by a march down Harbor Drive to Dead Mans Point and back via Pacific Hwy. San Diego Police estimated between 1,500 and 2,000 participants, while organizers felt "it was probably 8,000 to 10,000." Speakers included San Diego County Supervisor Nora Vargas and state Sen. pro tempore Toni Atkins.
California	San Francisco		thousands	A rally took place outside San Francisco City Hall at Civic Center Area, followed by a march along Market Street to Embarcadero.
California	San Jose		300	protesters marched to San Jose City Hall
California	San Luis Obispo		few hundred	A rally was held outside San Luis Obispo Superior Court followed by a march downtown. A separate march was planned in Mission Plaza, on Chorro St.
California	San Pedro		22	rally held at sidewalks of 25th and Western Avenue. US Rep Nanette Barragán stood with the protesters.
California	Santa Barbara		hundreds	rally held at De La Guerra Plaza
California	Santa Clarita		130	corner of McBean Pkwy at Valencia Blvd - Santa Clarita City Hall
California	Santa Cruz		hundreds	Santa Cruz Clock Tower - Santa Cruz County Courthouse steps on Water Street
California	Santa Maria		dozens	rally at Santa Maria City Hall, followed by a march down Broadway
California	Santa Rosa		500	rally held at Old Courthouse Square
California	Seal Beach		125-150	rally/march at NE Corner of Main St and Electric Ave
California	Simi Valley			event planned at Simi Valley Civic Center
California	Sonoma			event planned at Sonoma City Hall
California	Stockton		50	rally at Stockton City Hall, march down El Dorado Street
California	Temecula			march planned: Temecula Duck Pond - Temecula City Hall
California	Truckee			event planned at Eagle Statue, Spring St and Donner Pass Rd
California	Tustin		TBD	event held at Peppertree Park
California	Twentynine Palms			event planned at Bucklin Park
California	Ukiah			event planned at Mendocino County Courthouse
California	Upland			event planned at Planned Parenthood, W. Foothill Rd
California	Vallejo		100	Vallejo City Hall - Farmer's Market
California	Van Nuys			march planned: Van Nuys City Hall - Los Angeles Valley College
California	Ventura		hundreds	rally & march at Ventura City Hall
California	Walnut Creek		308	At Civic Park, Women's March Contra Costa organized a "PRO ROE" human banner event, where hundreds of protesters spelled out the words "SAVE ROE" for aerial photos.
California	Weaverville			event planned at Downtown Gazebo on Main
California	West Hollywood		few hundred	March down Santa Monica Blvd, rally at West Hollywood Park. Speakers included Santa Monica Mayor Sue Himmelrich, West Hollywood Mayor Lauren Meister, West Hollywood Mayor Pro Tem Sepi Shyne, and actress Patricia Arquette.
California	Westchester		300+	rally held at corner of La Tijera and Sepulveda Blvd. A statement by US Rep. Maxine Waters was read to the crowd.
California	Willits			event planned at Willits City Park
Colorado	Aspen		12+	Paepcke Park - Wagner Park
Colorado	Boulder		200+	Boulder County Courthouse - downtown Boulder
Colorado	Breckenridge			event planned at Stephen C West Ice Arena
Colorado	Castle Rock			march planned: Douglas County Fairgrounds - Douglas County Municipal Building
Colorado	Colorado Springs		couple hundred	America The Beautiful Park - downtown Colorado Springs
Colorado	Cortez			event planned at Parque de Vida Amphitheater
Colorado	Denver		5,000	Womxn's March Denver held a rally outside the Colorado State Capitol. US. Rep Diana DeGette spoke at the rally.
Colorado	Durango		400	Hundreds demonstrated at Buckley Park, over 250 of whom had marched from Durango & Silverton Railroad Depot.
Colorado	Eagle			event planned at Color Coffee, Sylvan Lake Rd
Colorado	Estes Park			march planned: Estes Park Visitors Center - Bond Park
Colorado	Fort Collins		hundreds	rally at Library Park in Old Town, followed by a march through the streets
Colorado	Grand Junction		200	event held at Old County Courthouse
Colorado	Greeley		100+	Weld County Courthouse - Lincoln Park
Colorado	Gunnison			march and rally planned at Jorgensen Park Gazebo
Colorado	Longmont		200+	Roosevelt Park - 5th Avenue & back. State Rep. Karen McCormick (D-Longmont) spoke to the crowd and also marched.
Colorado	Lyons			event planned at Sandstone Park
Colorado	Montrose		dozens	US Congressional candidate Kellie Rhodes spoke at a rally outside the Montrose County Old Courthouse.
Colorado	Pagosa Springs			event planned at Pagosa Springs Clock Tower
Colorado	Pueblo		several dozen	rally held at Old Pueblo County Courthouse; Colorado House Majority Leader Daneya Esgar spoke to the crowd.
Colorado	Salida		70+	Chaffee County Women's March; Alpine Park - Riverside Park
Colorado	Steamboat Springs		200	West Lincoln Park - Routt County Courthouse
Colorado	Telluride			event planned at 300 W Colorado Ave
Colorado	Trinidad			sign holding event planned at street corner, Main Street and Santa Fe Trail Road
Colorado	Walsenburg			event planned at Huerfano County Courthouse
Connecticut	Hartford		hundreds	rally held at Connecticut State Capitol
Connecticut	Kent		300+	The Women's March in Kent began at Town Hall and stretched along both sides of North Main Street. Lt. Gov. Susan Bysiewicz participated.
Connecticut	Litchfield			event planned at Litchfield Green
Connecticut	New London		300	Soldiers & Sailors Monument, Parade Plaza - Court House. New London Mayor Michael Passero spoke at the rally.
Connecticut	Pawcatuck		100	rally held at Pawcatuck-Westerly Bridge
Connecticut	Redding		~dozens	rally held at Redding Roadhouse; US Sen. Richard Blumenthal spoke at this rally after Stamford.
Connecticut	Salisbury		250+	rally held at the town green in front of White Hart Inn
Connecticut	Stamford		200	rally held outside Stamford-Norwalk Judicial District Courthouse; US Sen. Richard Blumenthal spoke at both this rally and one in Redding, CT.
Connecticut	Westport		300	rally held at Ruth Steinkraus Cohen Bridge
Connecticut	Wilton			event planned at Wilton Town Hall
Delaware	Dover			event planned at Delaware Legislative Hall
Delaware	Seaford		100	Near the site of a new Planned Parenthood clinic, pro-choice demonstrators stood along one side of Bridgeville Highway, while twice as many pro-life counter-protesters stood on the opposite side.
Delaware	Wilmington		70+	rally held at Rodney Square
Florida	Boynton Beach			event planned at Hurricane Grill
Florida	Bradenton		1,000+	Hundreds marched along the Riverwalk from Rossi Park to the Manatee County Commissioners Office. Speakers at said destination included US senatorial candidate Ken Russell (who also marched) and US Congressman & former Republican Gov. Charlie Crist, now running for Governor again (as a Democrat).
Florida	Brooksville			candlelight vigil planned at Brooksville Courthouse steps
Florida	Cape Coral		TBD	event held at corner of Del Prado and Cape Pkwy
Florida	Clermont			event planned at Cagan Crossing Community Library
Florida	Defuniak Springs			event planned at Defuniak Springs Courthouse
Florida	Delray Beach		200	rally held at Old School Square; speakers included Delray Beach Mayor Shelly Petrolia & State Sen. Lori Berman. People then marched to South Palm Beach County Courthouse.
Florida	Flagler Beach		100	rally held at Wadsworth Park Entrance (State Road 100 Bridge)
Florida	Fort Lauderdale		hundreds	rally at Huizenga Park - march along East Las Olas Blvd
Florida	Fort Myers		600	People lined the sidewalks of MLK Boulevard outside Lee County Justice Center.
Florida	Fort Pierce		150	rally held at Alto Lee Adams, Sr. U.S. Courthouse.
Florida	Fort Walton Beach		100	The first Women's March in Oklaloosa County began at City Hall and ended in Liza Jackson Park.
Florida	Gainesville		several thousand	Two separate marches, starting at Depot Park and the corner of University Ave & 13th St, merged into a rally at Cora P. Roberson Park
Florida	Inverness			event planned at Old Courthouse
Florida	Jacksonville		hundreds	Car caravans converged at a rally at Duval County Courthouse, whereupon people marched to Jacksonville City Hall.
Florida	Key West		150+	Duval Street Pocket Park - Mallory Square
Florida	Kissimmee			event planned at The Loop Shopping Center, corner of John Young Pkwy & Osceola Pkwy
Florida	Lake Worth			event planned at Lake Worth City Hall
Florida	Lakeland			march planned: RP Funding Center, W. Lime Street - Francis Langford Promenade
Florida	Leesburg			event planned at Leesburg Main Street
Florida	Melbourne		400	The Space Coast Women's March of Melbourne started at Pineapple Park Pavilion.
Florida	Miami		250	rally & march begun at Colonial Drive Park
Florida	Naples		300	Hundreds came to rally outside Collier County Courthouse, only to surround and clash with 40 counter-protesters at the same spot. Adam Gentle, a candidate running for the House seat of Rep. Mario Diaz-Balart, was present.
Florida	Niceville			rally planned at Saint Kitts Cove
Florida	Ocala		dozens	At the corners of two adjacent intersections (Silver Springs Blvd & SW 10th St) of S. Pine Ave (near the US Federal Courthouse), both supporters and opponents of abortion rights gathered, waved signs and at times shouted at each other. In some instances, people from either side crossed the street to mingle and argue with the other, prompting cops to come quell disagreements between both sides.
Florida	Orange City			event planned at State Rep. Webster Barnaby's office
Florida	Orlando		1,000+	Orlando City Hall - federal courthouse in Parramore. State Rep. Anna Eskamani (D-Orlando) spoke to the crowd.
Florida	Ormond Beach		300	march across Granada Bridge and back
Florida	Palatka		~20	Groups both for and against abortion gathered near Millennium Clock Tower.
Florida	Palmetto Bay		~100	rally held at Coral Reef Park
Florida	Panama City		100	Dozens gathered at Carl Gray Park, then marched over Hathaway Bridge.
Florida	Pensacola		60+	The Pensacola Chapter of Women's March Florida and The Workers World Party organized a car caravan through downtown, starting at Open Books Bookstore & Prison Book Project and ending with a Rally for Choice at Graffiti Bridge. Several counter-protesters showed up at the rally.
Florida	Port Charlotte		250+	People gathered at Live Oak Point Park in Charlotte Harbor for a march down to the center of the U.S. 41 bridge and back
Florida	Port Orange		70	rally held at intersection at Dunlawton Ave and Nova Rd
Florida	Punta Gorda			event planned at Live Oak Point Park, 5100 Tamiami Trail
Florida	Sebastian			event planned at Riverview Park
Florida	Spring Hill			sign holding event; corner of Mariner and Cortez
Florida	St. Augustine		200	march from Plaza De La Constitucion to the lawn of the Castillo de San Marcos
Florida	St. Petersburg		1,000+	march from Vinoy Park to the end of St. Petersburg Pier
Florida	Stuart		300	Hundreds stood along the northeast side of the Roosevelt Bridge.
Florida	Tallahassee		200+	Over 100 activists marched from Railroad Square Art District to join 100 more at the Florida State Capitol Building.
Florida	Tampa		200	marches began at MacDill Park on the Riverwalk and Perry Harvey Park
Florida	Tarpon Springs		500-750	A rally took place outside US Rep. Gus Bilirakis's office, followed by a caravan of 150 cars down Rte 19 to a protest outside the ofiice of Florida House Speaker Chris Sprowls.
Florida	The Villages		2,000	Heald Way parking lot across from Colony Plaza - Lake Sumter Landing. The marchers were accompanied and cheered on by more supporters in a caravan of golf carts.
Florida	West Palm Beach		hundreds	rally held on Great Lawn on Flagler Park
(Georgia (U.S. state)) Georgia	Alpharetta		TBD	march held at intersection of Encore Pkwy & Northpoint Pkwy
(Georgia (U.S. state)) Georgia	Athens		60+	(Sun, Oct 3) Prior to the pro-choice gathering beside The Arch at the University of Georgia, a pro-life crowd of almost equal size stood at the same spot until 3 pm. The former then marched to the courthouse and city hall.
(Georgia (U.S. state)) Georgia	Atlanta		5,000 - 10,000	Thousands rallied at Liberty Plaza, across from the Georgia State Capitol, then marched down Piedmont Ave.
(Georgia (U.S. state)) Georgia	Augusta		100+	Women's March Augusta gathered at the Augusta Common, then marched down Reynolds St. to the Federal Courthouse. Two dozen pro-life counter demonstrators also showed up across the street from the Common.
(Georgia (U.S. state)) Georgia	Brunswick			event planned at Brunswick City Hall
(Georgia (U.S. state)) Georgia	Decatur			event planned at Decatur City Hall
(Georgia (U.S. state)) Georgia	Duluth		130+	rally held outside Duluth Municipal Court
(Georgia (U.S. state)) Georgia	Macon		100+	rally held at Rosa Parks Square
(Georgia (U.S. state)) Georgia	Rome			event planned at Floyd County Courthouse
(Georgia (U.S. state)) Georgia	Savannah		400+	Protesters gathered around the fountain at Forsyth Park, then marched down Bull Street to Johnson Square. Among the speakers was former Savannah Mayor Edna Jackson.
(Georgia (U.S. state)) Georgia	Smyrna			sign rally planned at intersection of Spring And Atlanta Roads, Newks Corner
(Georgia (U.S. state)) Georgia	Statesboro		40	Sweetheart Circle, Southern Drive - Bulloch County Judicial Annex
(Georgia (U.S. state)) Georgia	Valdosta			event planned at Old Lowndes County Courthouse
Hawaii	Hilo		70-100	A sign-waving event was held on Kamehameha Ave at Bayfront; over 100 signs were left on display along the fence.
Hawaii	Honolulu		hundreds	Protesters lined South Beretania Street outside the Hawaii State Capitol.
Hawaii	Kailua-Kona			event planned at 4 corner intersection of Makala Blvd. and Queen Ka’ahumanu Hwy
Hawaii	Kaunakakai (Molokai)			event planned at Paddlers Inn out front, 10 Mohala St
Hawaii	Paauilo			march planned from bottom of Waikaalulu to Pohakea Mauka and back
Idaho	Boise			events planned at Julia Davis Park Gene Harris Bandshell and Idaho State Capitol
Idaho	Coeur d'Alene		300	Kootenai County Women's March & rally was held at Riverstone Park Amphitheater.
Idaho	Grangeville			event planned at Idaho County court house
Idaho	Idaho Falls			event planned at Green belt, Broadway
Idaho	Moscow		dozens	Moscow City Hall - East City Park
Idaho	Pocatello		dozens	rally held outside Pocatello City Hall
Illinois	Aurora		150+	A rally and march took place at Simmons Park (in the rain). State Rep. Barbara Hernandez addressed the crowd.
Illinois	Belleville			event planned at Belleville Loop
Illinois	Buffalo Grove			event planned at Mike Rylko Community Park
Illinois	Carbondale		dozens	rally held inside Carbondale Civic Center, followed by a march downtown
Illinois	Champaign-Urbana		hundreds	A rally was held near the UIUC Alma Mater statue, followed by a march to Champaign County State Courthouse.
Illinois	Chicago		3,000	Thousands of demonstrators gathered at Daley Plaza for a "Defend Abortion Access" rally; Chicago Mayor Lori Lightfoot was present. Protesters then marched through the Loop. A small counter-protest formed in the southwest corner of Daley Plaza, and tailed the march.
Illinois	Edwardsville		13+	A march downtown began at Madison County Courthouse.
Illinois	Elgin			event planned at corner intersection of Kimball Street at Grove Avenue
Illinois	Glenview		nearly 300	rally at Jackman Park; march down Lehigh Ave to Glenview Ave intersection outside the library
Illinois	Highland Park			event planned at Port Clinton
Illinois	Joliet			event planned at Larkin Ave & Jefferson St parking lot
Illinois	Kankakee			event planned at Kankakee County Courthouse
Illinois	Lemont			sign holding event planned at corner of 127th St & State St
Illinois	Mt. Vernon			march planned: City Hall - Mt. Vernon court house
Illinois	Naperville		dozens	(Sun, Oct 3) rally held at Naperville Riverwalk Free Speech Pavilion
Illinois	Normal		dozens(?)	(Sat, Oct 9; rain date) Students at Illinois State University led a march from the Quad into Uptown, through the Sugar Creek Arts Festival.
Illinois	Ottawa		15	(Thur, Oct 7; rescheduled due to weather) Stand with Planned Parenthood Ottawa held a small rally at Washington Square Park, which was countered by 15 pro-life supporters.
Illinois	Palatine			event planned at Volunteer Plaza & Clock Tower
Illinois	Rock Island		hundreds	Schweibert Park - Rock Island County Courthouse/Justice Center
Illinois	Rockford		200	Hundreds rallied at Davis Park, then marched to the Federal Building and back. State Reps Maurice West and Dave Vella and state Sen. Steve Stadelman addressed the crowd.
Illinois	Springfield		several hundred	rally held at Old State Capitol Plaza; prominent among the crowd were the Illinois Handmaids, a group of women in red robes and white bonnets as depicted in Margaret Atwood's novel.
Illinois	Sterling			event planned at YWCA, 412 1st Avenue
Illinois	Woodstock		50+	McHenry County NOW's Women's March started with a rally at Woodstock Square. State Rep Suzanne Ness (D-Crystal Lake) addressed the crowd.
Illinois	Yorkville		~30	sign-waving line-up on the sidewalk at Town Square Park
Indiana	Bloomington		dozens	Students of Indiana University and community members gathered at the Sample Gates, waving signs along Indiana Ave.
Indiana	Columbus		dozens	march held at Bartholomew County Courthouse
Indiana	Evansville		~60	rally held at Four Freedoms Monument
Indiana	Fort Wayne		30+	Protesters gathered outside the Allen County Courthouse.
Indiana	Greencastle		TBD	event held at Greencastle Courthouse Square
Indiana	Indianapolis		hundreds	Protesters braved pouring rain as they stood for a rally outside the City-County Building at Lugar Plaza. State Rep. Sue Errington (D-Muncie) and comedian Chelsea Handler spoke at the event. At the perimeter of the rally area, a small group of counter-protesters lined East Washington St.
Indiana	Madison			event planned at Jefferson County Courthouse
Indiana	Muncie		36	gathering at Beneficence statue planned for a caravan to Indianapolis; State Rep. Sue Errington (D-Muncie) was present.
Indiana	Noblesville			event planned at Noblesville Square
Indiana	Notre Dame			event planned at Hesburgh Library Lawn
Indiana	Plymouth			virtual event planned at Marshall County Courthouse
Indiana	Rushville			event planned at Rush County Courthouse
Indiana	South Bend		50	rally held at John R. Hunt Plaza, in front of the Morris Performing Arts Theatre.
Indiana	Terre Haute		80	The Wabash Valley Rally for Reproductive Rights was held at Fairbanks Park (march included). After the rally, some attendees went to the Vigo County Courthouse to display their signs to passing motorists.
Indiana	Valparaiso			event planned at Porter County Courthouse
Iowa	Ames		30+	Protesters stood on the sidewalks along Lincoln Way.
Iowa	Ankeny			event planned at Ankeny City Hall
Iowa	Burlington			march planned: Jefferson St. - River Front
Iowa	Cedar Rapids		150+	rally held at Greene Square Park, march to 1st Ave & back. State Rep. Molly Donahue attended the event.
Iowa	Decorah			bake sale planned at Water Street Park
Iowa	Des Moines		1,000+	Hundreds rallies and march outside at Iowa State Capitol.
Iowa	Dubuque			event planned at Alison's Henderson University
Iowa	Fairfield			event planned at Central Park, West Burlington at North Main Street in Fairfield's town square
Iowa	Forest City			event planned at City Hall
Iowa	Iowa City		few dozen	rally at Iowa City Pedestrian Mall, Dubuque Street - Old Capitol building
Iowa	Mason City			event planned at Central Park
Iowa	Sioux City		25+	Pearl Street Park - Sioux City Public Museum
Iowa	Spirit Lake			event planned at Dickinson County Courthouse
Iowa	Waterloo		100+	Protesters gathered outside the offices of US Sen. Chuck Grassley and US Rep. Ashley Hinson.
Kansas	Garden City			event planned at Stevens Park
Kansas	Hays			march to the corner of 27th and Vine
Kansas	Hutchinson			event planned outside Hutchinson City Accounting
Kansas	Lawrence		several hundred	A rally was held at Watson Park, followed by a march up & down Massachusetts St. State Sen. Marci Francisco and state Rep. Barbara Ballard spoke at the event.
Kansas	Manhattan		30+	A rally was held at Triangle Park, followed by a march through Aggieville; several counter-protesters were met along the way.
Kansas	Pittsburg		dozens	Pittsburg State University's Altruistic Alliance of University Women started a march at Immigrant Park, going from 2nd Street to 11th Street and back, and ending with a rally at Pritchett Pavilion.
Kansas	Salina		35	City-County Building on Ash St - march down S. Santa Fe Ave to W. Prescott Ave and back
Kansas	Topeka		250	A few hundred people marched from Evergy Plaza to the Kansas Statehouse for a rally. Three anti-abortion advocates also showed up, but mostly kept their distance.
Kansas	Wichita		several hundred	Women's March Air Capital held its rally at Old Town Square and marched (through rain) to Wichita City Hall.
Kentucky	Covington		hundreds	rally in front of US District Court Clerk Building
Kentucky	Elizabethtown			event planned at Hardin County Courthouse
Kentucky	Frankfort			event planned at Kentucky State Capitol
Kentucky	Glasgow		20	rally held outside the Barren County Courthouse
Kentucky	Lexington		hundreds	event held at Fayette County Courthouse
Kentucky	Louisville		150+	A rally was held on the steps of Louisville Metro Hall and both sides of Jefferson St. Demonstrators then marched downtown, but not before having to argue with a group of counter-protesters.
Kentucky	Marion			event planned at Crittenden County CourtHouse Pagoda
Kentucky	Paducah		50	rally held indoors (due to rain) at the W.C. Young Community Center
Louisiana	Baton Rouge			event planned at Louisiana State Capitol Building
Louisiana	Denham Springs			event planned at Denham Springs City Hall
Louisiana	New Orleans		200	In spite of a little rain, protesters rallied at Louis Armstrong Park, then marched to City Hall.
Maine	Augusta			event planned at Capitol Park, Union St
Maine	Bangor		25	event held at Pierce Park (next to the Bangor Library)
Maine	Bar Harbor		18+	event held at Village Green, corner of Main Street and Mt. Desert Street
Maine	Belfast		25	march along Market St from Belfast District Court to Belfast City Hall
Maine	Belgrade		60+	march held at Belgrade Village Green
Maine	Blue Hill		60	march and gathering at Blue Hill Town Hall
Maine	Brunswick		at least 3	event held near gazebo at Brunswick Town Mall
Maine	Eastport			event planned at The Breakwater, 1 Sullivan Pier
Maine	Houlton			event planned at Peace Pole at Monument Park, Military Street, across from UU Church
Maine	Kennebunk			event planned at corner of Main St. and Summer St
Maine	Lubec			event planned at Flatiron Park
Maine	Milbridge			event planned at Milbridge Commons and down Maine Street
Maine	North Haven			event planned at Ball Field, Church Street
Maine	Portland		200+	rally held at Congress Square Park. State Sen. Cathy Breen (D-Cumberland) spoke at the event.
Maine	Rockland		60	Chapman Park - 294 Main Street (corner of Park & Main)
Maine	Waterville		150	Pleasant Street United Methodist Church - Waterville Unitarian Universalist Church
Maryland	Annapolis		hundreds	rally at Lawyers Mall in front of Maryland State House
Maryland	Baltimore		100+	rally at Baltimore City Hall - march down Fayette Street
Maryland	Cumberland		30	"Silence in Solidarity" held at City Hall Plaza.
Maryland	Delmar			march planned at Wood Creek Community Center
Maryland	Frederick			sign holding rally planned at Square Corner (corner of Patrick and Market Streets)
Maryland	Ocean City			(Sat, Oct 23) event planned at the Boardwalk between Trimpers & the Ripley's Museum
Maryland	Salisbury		100	rally held at plaza in front of Salisbury City County Government Building
Massachusetts	Acton		75	Acton Indivisible held its first women's rally outside Acton Town Hall on Main Street.
Massachusetts	Amesbury		75+	rally held at Market Square; State Rep. Tram Nguyen was present.
Massachusetts	Amherst			event planned at sidewalk near Town Hall
Massachusetts	Boston		1,000+	More than 1,000 people rallied at Franklin Park's Playstead Park (near Franklin Park Zoo) in Roxbury. Speakers included Mass. Atty General Maura Healey, US Rep. Ayanna Pressley & US Sen. Ed Markey. Also present were Boston mayoral candidates Michelle Wu & Annissa Essaibi George.
Massachusetts	Falmouth			event planned at Peg Noonan Park
Massachusetts	Hyannis			event planned at Hyannis Rotary
Massachusetts	Ipswich			event planned at Center Green Hall Haskell Lawn
Massachusetts	Martha's Vineyard		dozens	rally held at Five Corners, Vineyard Haven
Massachusetts	Mashpee		30	sign-holding event held at Mashpee Rotary
Massachusetts	Melrose		18	State Rep. Kate Lipper-Garabedian stood with others outside Melrose City Hall.
Massachusetts	Nantucket			event planned at Nantucket Courthouse
Massachusetts	New Bedford		~100	rally and march held at Buttonwood Park
Massachusetts	Northampton		800+	Hundreds rallied at Northampton City Hall and marched down Main Street.
Massachusetts	Orleans		25	sign-holding event held around the Orleans rotary
Massachusetts	Plymouth		300	event held at Plymouth Town Hall
Massachusetts	Quincy		50	A rally in Hancock-Adams Common took place several hours before the Boston rally, allowing people to attend both.
Massachusetts	Sandwich			event planned at Mill Creek Park
Massachusetts	Shrewsbury			event planned at Shrewsbury Town Common, across from the library
Massachusetts	Southwick			event planned at Southwick Center, College Highway
Massachusetts	Wareham		30	Protesters stood outside Wareham Town Tall along Marion Road.
Michigan	Adrian			event planned at Lenawee County Old Courthouse
Michigan	Ann Arbor		hundreds	A protest was held in front of the Federal Building, followed by a march downtown. US Reps. Haley Stevens & Debbie Dingell spoke at the rally.
Michigan	Battle Creek			event planned at Monument Park, East Michigan Ave
Michigan	Big Rapids		30-50	rally held at Mitchell Creek Park, followed by a march downtown
Michigan	Birmingham			event planned at Shain Park
Michigan	Cheboygan			event planned at Washington Park
Michigan	Detroit		500+	A rally was held outside and 36th District Court on Madison St, followed by a march downtown.
Michigan	Flint		150	march held on the sidewalk of Saginaw Street, between the downtown flat lot and courthouse.
Michigan	Grand Rapids		hundreds	Crowds gathered on the Blue Bridge.
Michigan	Harrisville			march planned at Pocket Park, Main Street
Michigan	Holland		100+	rally held at Centennial Park
Michigan	Houghton/Hancock		80	march across Portage Lake Life Bridge
Michigan	Iron Mountain			event planned at parking lot behind Iron Mountain City Hall
Michigan	Kalamazoo		2,500	rally held at Bronson Park, followed by a march downtown, stopping traffic to protest the Texas abortion ban, and ending at West Michigan Ave.
Michigan	Lansing		hundreds	The "MI Body MI Choice" rally was held at the Michigan State Capitol. Speakers included U.S. Sen. Debbie Stabenow, state Rep. Sarah Anthony and state Sen. Erika Geiss. One particular issue of concern was an anti-abortion ordinance in the town of Hillsdale, similar to Texas' recent ban, that would affect all of Michigan should Roe v. Wade be overturned.
Michigan	Livonia			event planned at Livonia City Hall
Michigan	Ludington			event planned at Rotary Park, W Ludington Avenue
Michigan	Manistee		80	rally held at Manistee City Hall
Michigan	Marquette		TBD	event held at Marquette post office on Washington St
Michigan	Monroe			event planned at General Custer Equestrian Monument
Michigan	Muskegon			event planned at Hackley Park
Michigan	Petoskey			event planned at Big Hole on US-31, 200 East Lake St.
Michigan	Pontiac			event planned at Oakland County Court House
Michigan	Port Huron			event planned at Pine Grove Park
Michigan	Richmond			event planned at Old K-mart parking lot
Michigan	Rochester Hills			event planned at Rochester Municipal Park
Michigan	Royal Oak			event planned at Downtown Royal Oak/Ferndale, West 7th St
Michigan	Sault Ste. Marie			march planned: Farmer's Market, Ashmun & Portage - City Hall - County Court House
Michigan	Southgate			virtual event planned
Michigan	Traverse City		100+	People stretched up and down Grandview Parkway, in front of the Open Space, with posters and signs to make their voices heard.
Michigan	West Bloomfield			event planned at Shir Shalom, Walnut Lake Road
Minnesota	Anoka			event planned at First Congregational Church, 3rd Ave
Minnesota	Bemidji			event planned at Paul Bunyan and Babe the Blue Ox statues
Minnesota	Brainerd			event planned at historic watertower intersection at Washington St
Minnesota	Duluth		100	Women's March of Duluth began at St. Louis County Courthouse and concluded at the Clayton Jackson McGhie Memorial on First Street, where it joined up with Duluth NAACP's "decriminalize color" rally (referring to racial profiling by police).
Minnesota	Grand Marais			event planned at Harbor Park
Minnesota	International Falls			event planned at Smokey Bear Park
Minnesota	Minneapolis		2,000 - 10,000	Thousands rallied at Minneapolis Sculpture Garden, then marched to Loring Park. Elected officials in attendance included Sen. Amy Klobuchar, Lt. Gov. Peggy Flanagan, and state Reps. Sydney Jordan, Emma Greenman and Kaohly Her.
Minnesota	Morris			march planned: Stevens County District Courthouse parking lot - downtown on 4th St
Minnesota	Red Wing			kick-off event planned at Ignite, 419 Bush Street
Minnesota	Rochester		140-150	Olmsted County Government Center - Soldiers Field Veterans Memorial
Minnesota	Saint Louis Park			event planned at Walking Bridge, Minnetonka Blvd
Minnesota	St. Cloud		50+	rally held at Barden Park, St Cloud State University
Mississippi	Biloxi		25	rally and march around Biloxi City Hall
Mississippi	Jackson		three dozen	rally held outside Smith-Wills Stadium on the side walk of Lakeland Drive. A few pro-life protesters also showed up.
Mississippi	Oxford		40-50	rally held at RSVP Plaza, next to City Hall
Missouri	Cape Girardeau		(dozen)	march held at Freedom Corner, Capaha Park, on Broadway Street (in the pouring rain)
Missouri	Columbia		200	rally held at Boone County Courthouse Plaza (with a little rain). Speakers included state Rep. Martha Stevens.
Missouri	Farmington			event planned at 110 Columbia St
Missouri	Festus			event planned at intersection, Hwy A & 61/67
Missouri	Independence			event planned at west parking lot of The Pharaoh Cinema
Missouri	Jefferson City			event planned at Missouri State Capitol
Missouri	Joplin		30-40	A small sign-holding rally for women's reproductive rights was held outside the North Point Shopping Mall parking lot, at the northwest corner of 7th & Rangeline Rd. At the southeast corner, counter-protesters showed up to oppose the event. Some from the original event decided to go over, leading to a fight and resulting in one male pro-lifer's arrest for misdemeanor assault upon one of the female activists.
Missouri	Kansas City		1,400+	Two women's rights events took place in Missouri's largest city, each with hundreds of people. Reale Justice Network and ACLU of Missouri held a rally at Milk Creek Park and a march to the streets of Country Club Plaza. Another much larger rally & march, from the Crossroads to the City Market, was organized by Women's March Kansas City 2021.
Missouri	Kirksville			sign holding event planned at Rotary Park, along Baltimore Street
Missouri	Springfield		hundreds	Me Too Springfield hosted a rally in Park Central Square
Missouri	St. Charles			event planned at Lewis and Clark Boathouse and Museum
Missouri	St. Louis		300	Hundreds rallied at Luther Ely Smith Square near the Gateway Arch; State Senator Karla May (D-St. Louis) addressed the crowd. Protesters then crossed 4th Street to the Old Courthouse, where they stood with their signs raised to block those held by a small group of anti-abortion counter-demonstrators.
Montana	Billings		100	North Park - Yellowstone County Courthouse
Montana	Bozeman		TBD	Gallatin County March: Haufbrau, South 8th Ave - Law & Justice Center
Montana	Great Falls		200	Gibson Park bandshell, River's Edge Trail
Montana	Helena		400+	People marched around the grounds of the Montana State Capitol prior to a rally on the lawn. Speakers included state Reps. Mary Ann Dunwell & Laurie Bishop, the latter of whom is running for a US congressional seat.
Montana	Missoula		200+	rally held at Missoula County Courthouse. Counter-protesters were present c/o anti-COVID-mask activists that convened at the courthouse every Saturday.
Montana	Whitefish		300	rally held outside Whitefish City Hall
Nebraska	Alliance			event planned at Box Butte County Court House
Nebraska	Lincoln		hundreds	march around the Nebraska State Capitol, starting with a rally on the north side
Nebraska	Omaha		hundreds	rally held outside Omaha City Hall
Nevada	Carson City		hundreds	rally at Nevada State Legislature
Nevada	Henderson		(300)	Nichole Beer, a teacher running for Nevada Senate District 20, organized a rally & march at The Shoppes on the Parkway parking lot.
Nevada	Las Vegas		700	Hundreds marched down South Las Vegas Boulevard past the Lloyd D. George Federal Courthouse.
Nevada	Pahrump			event planned at Nugget Corner, Hwy 160 & Hwy 372
Nevada	Reno		hundreds	rally at Locomotion Plaza
New Hampshire	Center Harbor		30+	sign-holding event at corner of NH-25 and Main St
New Hampshire	Claremont			event planned at Broad Street Park
New Hampshire	Concord		hundreds	At a morning rally outside the New Hampshire Statehouse, speakers addressed recent abortion restrictions signed into law by New Hampshire Gov. Chris Sununu.
New Hampshire	Durham			event planned at The University of New Hampshire, on Main Street
New Hampshire	Keene		50+	rally held at Central Square
New Hampshire	Lancaster		50	rally at Great North Woods Welcome Center, followed by a march downtown (in the rain)
New Hampshire	Lebanon		100+	rally & march at Colburn Park
New Hampshire	Nashua			event planned at Greeley Park
New Hampshire	New London		~60	rally & march held at New London Town Green
New Hampshire	Plaistow			event planned at Plaistow Town Hall
New Hampshire	Portsmouth		several hundred	A rally was held at Market Square outside North Church, followed by a march down Congress St to State Street and back.
New Jersey	Basking Ridge		200	rally held at Allen Street Gazebo near corner of Allen and Finley
New Jersey	Bridgeton			event planned in front of Courthouse on West Broad St
New Jersey	Cliffside Park		TBD	sign holding venue & march along Anderson Ave & Lafayette Ave
New Jersey	Fair Lawn		TBD	sign holding event held outside Fair Lawn Municipal Building
New Jersey	Flemington			event planned at Hunterdon County Court House
New Jersey	Haddon Heights		240	sign holding rally & march held at McLaughlin & Norcross Memorial Dell Park, near Rowan University
New Jersey	Hoboken		50-60	march down Washington Street
New Jersey	Jersey City			(Sun, Oct 3) event planned at City Hall Plaza, Grove Street
New Jersey	Keyport			(Sun, Oct 3) event planned at Keyport police station
New Jersey	Montclair		800	A massive rally was held outside Montclair's Municipal Building on Claremont Ave, followed by a march along North Fullerton Ave & Bloomfield Ave. Rally speakers (and marchers) included US Rep. Mikie Sherrill, Montclair Mayor Sean Spiller and NJ Governor & First Lady Phil & Tammy Murphy.
New Jersey	Morristown		40+	Scores of women rallied at Morristown Town Hall, then marched to the Green
New Jersey	Newton			events planned at Newton Green and Veteran's Park
New Jersey	Red Bank		1,000	Red Bank Train Station - Riverside Gardens Park
New Jersey	Rio Grande			event planned at corner of Routes 9 & 47
New Jersey	Ship Bottom			event planned at Causeway Bridge, 8th St
New Jersey	Springfield			event planned at Springfield Town Hall Lawn
New Jersey	Toms River		200	rally held at Huddy Park
New Jersey	Trenton			event planned at New Jersey Captiol Complex
New Jersey	Warren			event planned at Warren Township Municipal Complex
New Jersey	Willingboro		300+	South Jersey Women's March (the first in Willingboro) began with a 90-minute rally outside the JFK Recreation Center; NJ Gov. Phil Murphy and First Lady Tammy Murphy led the march.
New Mexico	Albuquerque		1,000	rally held at Tiguex Park, followed by a march to Old Town Plaza. Albuquerque Mayor Tim Keller attended the march.
New Mexico	Cloudcroft		dozen	Two opposite rallies, each with a dozen people, stood across from each other along James Canyon Hwy at Zenith Park.
New Mexico	Farmington			event planned at Farmington Museum
New Mexico	Las Cruces		40+	rally at Albert Johnson Park, outside Las Cruces City Hall
New Mexico	Santa Fe		hundreds	rally at New Mexico State Capitol. Speakers included NM Gov. Michelle Lujan Grisham, US Rep. Teresa Leger Fernandez and state Reps. Linda Serrato, Tara Lujan and Nancy Rodriguez.
New Mexico	Silver City		100+	Murray Ryan Visitor Center - Gough Park
New Mexico	Socorro		at least 4	Socorro Historic Plaza
New Mexico	Taos		30+	rally held on intersection sidewalks in front of the World Cup Coffee Shop, at Paseo Del Pueblo Norte
New York	Albany		1,000+	Hundreds of attendees filled West Capitol Park. Acting NY Gov. Kathy Hochul, who had previously attended a rally in Seneca Falls, addressed the crowd, as did Albany Mayor Kathy Sheehan.
New York	Beacon			march planned at Memorial Park, Robert Cahill Drive
New York	Binghamton		100+	rally held on the steps of Broome County Courthouse
New York	Bronx		18+	rally held at Van Cortland Park; hosted by Northwest Bronx Indivisible
New York	Brooklyn		~2,000	Thousands gathered at Cadman Plaza Park, then marched across the Brooklyn Bridge to join another rally at Foley Square in Manhattan.
New York	Buffalo		hundreds	Demonstrators rallied at Prospect Park, then marched down Niagara Street to Buffalo City Hall.
New York	Canton		dozens	Planned Parenthood of the North Country on Miner Street - St. Lawrence County Courthouse
New York	Corning		55	Denison Park - Park Avenue - Denison Parkway
New York	Elmira		50	rally held at Wisner Park
New York	Glens Falls		150	rally held at Crandall Park; 15 counter-protesters stood across Glen Street.
New York	Gowanda / Persia			march planned: Gowanda Village Town Hall (Erie County) - Persia Town Hall (Cattaraugus County)
New York	Great Neck		hundreds	rally held at Firefighters Park; Senate Majority Leader Chuck Schumer joined the event.
New York	Hopewell Junction			event planned at Hopewell Recreation Park
New York	Hudson			event planned at 7th Street Park
New York	Hudson Valley			TBA
New York	Huntington Station		hundreds	event held at Walt Whitman Shops
New York	Ithaca		100+	rally held at Ho Plaza, Cornell University
New York	Jamestown		40+	The first Women's March of Jamestown, NY started in Dow Park and ended at City Hall.
New York	Kingston		350	A rally took place at Academy Green Park, followed by a 12-minute march through Uptown Kingston. State Sen. Michelle Hinchey attended the rally.
New York	Lindenhurst		hundreds	event held at Babylon Town Hall
New York	Mineola		200 - 300	Nassau County Courthouse - Nassau County Legislature
New York	Narrowsburg		~30	Women's March of Sullivan County was held at Narrowsburg-Darbytown Bridge.
New York	New Paltz		~60	A vigil was held on both sides of Main Street outside Elting Library.
New York	New York City		4,000 - 5,000	(Sat, Oct 2) an estimated 2,000 demonstrators rallied at Foley Square, soon to be joined by thousands more coming from Brooklyn. The combined groups then marched to Washington Square Park and Union Square. Speakers at Foley Square included US Reps Jerry Nadler & Carolyn Maloney. (Sun, Oct 3) rally planned on 5th Ave across from St. Patrick's Cathedral
New York	Newburgh		50+	A rally was held at Newburgh City Courthouse, followed by a march down Broadway to People's Park.
New York	Oneonta		100	rally at Muller Plaza
New York	Plattsburgh			event planned at Plattsburgh Harborside Stage
New York	Port Jefferson Station		hundreds	rally held at Resistance Corner
New York	Poughkeepsie			event planned at Poughkeepsie City Hall
New York	Queens		50	rally held on the steps of Queens Borough Hall
New York	Rochester		hundreds	A rally and march was held at Martin Luther King Jr Memorial Park. A counter-protest was held just a few feet away.
New York	Rome			event planned at Rome City Hall
New York	Saratoga Springs		170+	A rally was held near the Spirit of Life fountain in Congress Park, followed by a march down Broadway to City Hall and back; voter registration was provided by the League of Women Voters of Saratoga County.
New York	Seneca Falls		hundreds	At 10 am, people gathered at First Amendment Space in Women's Rights National Historical Park. Among the speakers was Kathy Hochul, New York's first female [acting] governor, who shortly thereafter headed to a bigger rally in Albany.
New York	Smithtown		hundreds	Smithtown Bull - Smithtown Town Hall
New York	Somers / Yorktown			rally for residents of both towns planned outside the Elephant Hotel in Somers
New York	Staten Island		nearly 100	Nearly 100 marched up Bay Street from the Alice Austin House to Borough Hall.
New York	Syracuse		150	Planned Parenthood's Syracuse Health Center - James M. Hanley Federal Building
New York	Utica		200	YWCA, Rutger Park - Nurses Candlelight Park (near Planned Parenthood)
New York	Watertown			event planned at Planned Parenthood of the North Country on Stone St
New York	White Plains		hundreds	The Westchester Women's March rally took place outside Westchester County Courthouse, on Martin Luther King Jr Boulevard. Speakers included US Reps. Mondaire Jones & Jamaal Bowman.
New York	Woodstock		~20	rally held at The Village Green
North Carolina	Angier			"On the Line 4 Womankind" event planned along Highway 401, from Raleigh to Fayetteville at Angier & five other NC cities
North Carolina	Asheville		100+	rally held at Pack Square Park
North Carolina	Charlotte		400	The march through downtown Charlotte began with a rally at First Ward Park.
North Carolina	Clayton			event planned at Clayton Town Hall
North Carolina	Durham		450+	rally held at CCB Plaza, march through downtown Durham
North Carolina	Fayetteville		100	Cross Creek Park - Cumberland County courthouse
North Carolina	Greensboro			rally planned at Governmental Plaza
North Carolina	Greenville		18	(Fri, Oct 1) Students at East Carolina University held a small rally and march at Student Center Lawn.
North Carolina	Hendersonville			event planned at all four corners of King St and 6th Ave intersection
North Carolina	Nags Head		100	rally held at Dowdy Park
North Carolina	New Bern		200+	Craven County Courthouse - Union Point Park
North Carolina	Raleigh		800 - 1,000	Hundreds of people filled Bicentennial Plaza, across from the State Legislative Building, for a women's rights rally. A handful of counter-demonstrators also stood by.
North Carolina	Sanford			event planned at Lee County Courthouse
North Carolina	Shallotte			event planned at Shallotte Town Hall
North Carolina	Sylva		75	rally at the Sylva Fountain followed by a march downtown
North Carolina	Weaverville			event planned at Weaverville Clock on Main Street
North Carolina	Wilmington		hundreds	rally held at Innes Park
North Carolina	Winston-Salem		130	Over 100 people marched from a parking deck on West 4th St to a rally at Winston-Salem City Hall.
North Dakota	Bismarck			events planned at ND State Capitol and United Tribes Technical College Veteran's Circle
North Dakota	Fargo		hundreds	Despite rain, a march through downtown went on as planned, starting at Island Park, and stopping by the Red River Women's clinic.
North Dakota	Minot			event planned at clerk of district court office
Ohio	Akron			event planned at Hardesty Park
Ohio	Cincinnati		260+	The Cincinnati Women's March took place at Fountain Square Plaza, City Hall, and the Hamilton County Courthouse
Ohio	Cleveland		1,000+	rally at Market Square Park, march to Carnegie Bridge
Ohio	Columbus		1,000+	Hundreds rallied at the Ohio Statehouse, then marched downtown. State Rep Allison Russo spoke at the rally.
Ohio	Dayton		250	march held at Courthouse Square
Ohio	Delaware			march planned: Delaware Historic Courthouse - City Hall
Ohio	Findlay			event planned at Dorney Plaza (in front of Court House)
Ohio	Gallipolis			event planned at Gallipolis City Park
Ohio	Lorain		50+	rally & march at Gazebo #5 near Lakeview Park/Beach
Ohio	Marietta			rally & march planned at Muskingum Park
Ohio	Mason		200	march held at Pine Hill Lakes Park
Ohio	Massillon			march planned downtown at corner of Wales and Lincoln Way
Ohio	Powell			event planned at Powell City Hall
Ohio	St. Marys			march planned: St. Marys clock tower, S Chestnut St - Spring St
Ohio	Toledo		hundreds	demonstration at sidewalks in front of Elder-Beerman, corner of Central and Secor Rd
Ohio	Wellington			event planned at Rte 58 / N. Main & Herrick Ave, in front of library
Ohio	Wilmington		10	gathering at 69 North South St.
Ohio	Xenia			event planned at Xenia Courthouse and corners of Detroit St and Main St
Ohio	Youngstown		few hundred	Old Board of Education, Wick Ave. & Wood St. - Mahoning County Courthouse on Market St
Oklahoma	Ardmore			event planned at Central Park
Oklahoma	Bethany			event planned at College and NW 39th St
Oklahoma	Choctaw			event planned at City Hall Choctaw
Oklahoma	Norman		20-25	(Wed, Oct 6) At the University of Oklahoma, Students for Reproductive Justice marched around campus, starting at the South Oval.
Oklahoma	Oklahoma City		1,000	Hundreds rallied and marched around the Oklahoma State Capitol. Former state Senator and [2nd time] Democratic candidate for Governor Connie Johnson spoke at the event.
Oklahoma	Tahlequah		40+	Tahlequah Women's "March Against the Madness" began with a silent protest at Norris Park; many were dressed in "Handmaid's Tale" costume.
Oklahoma	Tulsa		hundreds	Tulsa Federal building - Guthrie Green
Oregon	Ashland		90+	sign-holding rally along E Main St, across from Ashland Plaza Mall
Oregon	Bend		300	Harmon Park - Drake Park - Deschutes County Circuit Court
Oregon	Brookings			rally & march planned at 619 Chetco Avenue
Oregon	Condon			march planned: Condon City Park, Main Street - City Hall
Oregon	Coos Bay		60+	rally held at Coos Bay Boardwalk
Oregon	Corvallis		hundreds	Central Park, SW Monroe Ave - Benton County Courthouse
Oregon	Cottage Grove			event planned at All American City Square/Opal Whiteley Park
Oregon	Eugene		several hundred	sign holding rally held outside Wayne Lyman Morse US Courthouse, at intersection of E. 8th Ave and Coburg Rd.
Oregon	Florence			event planned at Florence City Hall
Oregon	Grants Pass		TBD	rally & march planned: Josephine County Courthouse lawn - City Hall
Oregon	Hood River		100+	rally held at Hood River County Library and Georgiana Smith Park
Oregon	Klamath Falls		21	rally & march at City Hall on Klamath Avenue
Oregon	La Grande		44	La Grande City Hall - march down Adams Ave
Oregon	Lincoln City			event planned at "D" River Wayside, Highway 101
Oregon	McMinnville		225	Edward Gormley Civic Plaza on 2nd St, next to McMinnville City Hall - march up Adams St to 8th & back via Baker St
Oregon	Medford			event planned at Medford Planned Parenthood
Oregon	Nehalem		dozens	Corner of Hwy 101 & 7th St - Nehalem Lumber store
Oregon	Pendleton		25+	Women's March Car Caravan (25 cars) was launched at Pendleton Round-Up parking lot (changed from Roy Raley Park)
Oregon	Port Orford		~33	Battle Rock Park - Highway 101 at 16th
Oregon	Portland		1,000+	PDX March for Reproductive Rights began with a rally outside Revolution Hall.
Oregon	Prineville			event planned at Pioneer Park
Oregon	Redmond			event planned at Centennial Park, SW Evergreen Ave
Oregon	Roseburg			event planned at corner of Garden Valley and Stewart Parkway
Oregon	Salem			events planned: march from Salem City Hall to Oregon Capitol Building and rally at Pringle Park
Oregon	Sandy			event planned at Centennial Plaza, Pioneer Blvd
Oregon	Scappoose			event planned at Heritage Park
Oregon	Sherwood		80+	rally held at Sherwood City Hall, followed by a march slong Sherwood Blvd to Hwy 99
Oregon	Springfield			event planned at Springfield City Hall, 225 5th Street
Oregon	Talent		5	small gathering at corner of Wagner and Talent Ave
Oregon	Tigard			march planned, starting at Public Works building/parking lot, Burnham St
Pennsylvania	Allentown		50	march planned at Allentown City Hall; a block away, pro-choicers stood outside the Edward N. Cain Courthouse & Federal Building on the southwest corner of Hamilton & N 5th St. On the opposite corner, a smaller pro-life crowd stood outside Lehigh County Courthouse.
Pennsylvania	Bellefonte			event planned at State Senator Jake Corman's district office
Pennsylvania	Bethlehem		200 - 1,000	At least several hundred people gathered at Payrow Plaza outside at Bethlehem City Hall.
Pennsylvania	Brookville			event planned at Jefferson County Courthouse, Main & Pickering
Pennsylvania	Doylestown			event planned at Bucks County Courthouse lawn
Pennsylvania	Dubois			event planned at Dubois City Park, Liberty Boulevard
Pennsylvania	Easton		100	Scott Park - Riverside Park
Pennsylvania	Erie		dozens	march through Perry Square and State St.
Pennsylvania	Greensburg			event planned at Westmoreland County Courthouse
Pennsylvania	Hanover			event planned at Hanover Square
Pennsylvania	Harrisburg		several hundred	A rally was held at the front steps of the Capitol Complex; Penn. Attorney General and likely 2022 Democratic candidate for Governor Josh Shapiro spoke to the crowd. Days earlier, thousands of abortion opponents had shown up on the Capitol steps for a pro-life march.
Pennsylvania	Hilltown			march planned on Creamery Rd
Pennsylvania	Indiana			march planned on 13th St & Philadelphia St
Pennsylvania	King of Prussia			march planned at intersection of Dekalb Pike (202) & Henderson Road
Pennsylvania	Lancaster			event planned at Penn Square
Pennsylvania	Lafayette Hill			Whitemarsh Women's March; location TBD
Pennsylvania	Lewisburg			peace vigil planned outside the post office at Market and 3rd Streets
Pennsylvania	Media		hundreds	rally at Delaware County courthouse
Pennsylvania	Palmerton			march planned around Palmerton Park
Pennsylvania	Philadelphia		1,000	Washington Monument, across from Philadelphia Art Museum - Philadelphia City Hall
Pennsylvania	Pittsburgh		few hundred	Hundreds gathered outside Pittsburgh City County Building and marched through downtown. Speakers included US Rep. Mike Doyle and state Rep. & Pittsburgh mayoral candidate Ed Gainey.
Pennsylvania	Reading		200	rally held at Reading City Park; guest speakers included Pennsylvania Lt. Gov. (and senatorial candidate) John Fetterman, his wife, Gisele, state Reps. Manny Guzman Jr. and Brian Sims, and state Sens. Katie Muth and Judy Schwank.
Pennsylvania	Scranton		~50	NEPA's Women's March was held at Lackawanna County Courthouse and John Mitchell Monument.
Pennsylvania	Summit Hill			event planned at Ludlow Park
Pennsylvania	Warren		50	rally held outside Warren County Courthouse
Pennsylvania	Washington			event planned at corner of Maiden St & South Main St
Pennsylvania	West Chester			event planned at the steps of The Historic Chester County Courthouse
Pennsylvania	Whitehall			event planned at Whitehall Township Building
Pennsylvania	Williamsport		50	gathering at intersection at Market & Third (all 4 corners)
Rhode Island	Block Island		40+	BI Histocial Society, Bridgegate Square - Statue of Rebecca at rotary near Nichols Park.
Rhode Island	Narragansett			event planned at Memorial Square
Rhode Island	North Kingstown		100+	rally held at North Kingstown town beach
Rhode Island	Providence		800+	march held at Providence Place Mall, Francis St
South Carolina	Charleston		600+	Charleston City Hall - U.S. Customs House
South Carolina	Columbia		at least 12	People marched at Martin Luther King Jr. Park.
South Carolina	Florence			event planned outside US Sen. Lindsey Graham's office
South Carolina	Greenville		300+	rally held at One City Plaza
South Carolina	Mauldin			event planned at Mauldin City Hall (to merge w/ Greenville event)
South Carolina	Myrtle Beach		90+	Dozens of people gathered for a rally within Chapin Memorial Park. Outside the park fence, a few pro-lifers lingered.
South Dakota	Aberdeen			event planned at Courthouse, 22 Court Street
South Dakota	Pierre			event planned at South Dakota State Capitol
South Dakota	Rapid City			event planned at Memorial Park, Omaha St
South Dakota	Sioux Falls		400	Carnegie Town Hall - Minnehaha County Court House
Tennessee	Bristol		70+	Sullivan County Women's March began with a rally by the Bristol Sign, then headed up and down State St.
Tennessee	Chattanooga		hundreds	A pro-choice rally and march happened at Renaissance Park, while at the same time a pro-life call to prayer took place on the steps of the Hamilton County Courthouse, across the Tennessee River. Another women's event was also scheduled at Miller Park.
Tennessee	Clarksville		15	sidewalk event held at corner of Wilma Rudolph Blvd & Needmore Rd (outside Hobby Lobby)
Tennessee	Cookeville			Dogwood Park Amphitheater - Historical Courthouse
Tennessee	Elizabethton			event planned at covered bridge, East Elk Avenue
Tennessee	Gatlinburg		dozens	In spite of it being labelled online as "cancelled", a peaceful march was held on River Road, outside Ripley's Aquarium of the Smokies; a clash with counter-protesters was recorded on video.
Tennessee	Johnson City		~150	Tri-Cities Women's March began with a rally in King Commons park, then took a path through downtown and ended at Founders Park.
Tennessee	Knoxville		hundreds	Women's March in Downtown Knoxville began with a rally at Krutch Park, near Market Square.
Tennessee	Memphis		162	event held at Ida B. Wells Statue and Plaza, with a little rain to boot.
Tennessee	Murfreesboro		200	event held at Civic Plaza
Tennessee	Nashville		2,000	Hundreds gathered for a massive rally at the Tennessee State Capitol, then marched downtown to the Estes Kefauver Federal Building & Courthouse. Along the way, marchers rallied outside AT&T, a major corporate donor to anti-abortion legislators and a sponsor of Texas Law SB8.
Texas	Abilene		80	The march to Abilene City Hall began with a rally outside Taylor County Courthouse; 50 counter-protesters stood across the street. Nolan County Attorney Samantha Morrow, the lone elected Republican invited to speak, had a broad message for both sides: as a traditional pro-life conservative, she strongly disagreed with the new Texas abortion ban, and encouraged both liberals and conservatives to work together on the issue.
Texas	Amarillo		300	Ellwood Park - court house
Texas	Arlington		30+	At the campus of the University of Texas at Arlington, demonstrators gathered on the pedestrian bridges above Cooper Street to protest the restrictive abortion bill recently signed into law by Gov. Greg Abbott.
Texas	Austin		1,000 - 25,000	Thousands rallied and marched at the Texas State Capitol; event organized by Women's March ATX. Speakers included Travis County Judge Andy Brown, US Rep Lloyd Doggett, state Sen Sarah Eckhardt and former state Sen. Wendy Davis. 30 counter-protesters also showed up.
Texas	Beaumont			virtual event planned
Texas	Bedford			event planned at Courthouse 6
Texas	Brenham			event planned at Washington County Courthouse
Texas	Brownsville		100	March from South Linear Park to Washington Park and back
Texas	Bryan		100+	Bryan/College Station March for Reproductive Rights took off from Bryan City Hall.
Texas	College Station			(Sun, Oct 3) demonstration planned at Rudder Plaza on the campus of Texas A&M University
Texas	Conroe			march planned: Heritage Park - City Hall - Court House
Texas	Copperas Cove		25-30	march held at Cove City Park
Texas	Corpus Christi		50	march held along Seawall in front of the Federal Courthouse
Texas	Corsicana			event planned at Navarro County Courthouse steps
Texas	Dallas		2,500 - 3,000	The BIPOC-led Reproductive Liberation March and Rally in Dallas took place at Main Street Gardens.
Texas	Del Rio			event planned at Civic Center on Veterans Blvd
Texas	Denton		500	Denton County Courthouse on the Square
Texas	Eagle Pass			march planned: Maverick County Lake - Shelby Park
Texas	Edinburg			event planned at Hidalgo County Courthouse
Texas	El Paso		hundreds	Marchers gathers at Chamizal National Memorial Park and marched down Delta along the 375 and under the international bridge.
Texas	Fort Worth		2,000	Tarrant County Courthouse - Fort Worth Convention Center
Texas	Frisco		250 - 400	Hundreds lined both sides of Main St, east of Toyota Stadium.
Texas	Galveston		30+	rally & march held in front of the Galveston Courthouse (in the rain)
Texas	Granbury			event planned at Hood County Courthouse
Texas	Grand Prairie		35+	event held at Grand Prairie City Hall
Texas	Grapevine			event planned at Grapevine Municipal Court
Texas	Houston		10,000+	Thousands marched from Discovery Green to Houston City Hall. Speakers included Houston Mayor Sylvester Turner & "Top Chef" actress Padma Lakshmi.
Texas	Huntsville			march: Sam Houston State University - Walker County Courthouse
Texas	Laredo		18+	march & rally held at Texas A&M International University, Zaffirini Green; US congressional candidates Tannya Benavides & Jessica Cisneros participated.
Texas	Lubbock		120+	Timothy Cole Memorial Park
Texas	Lufkin			event planned at Lufkin Courthouse
Texas	McAllen			event planned at Archer Park
Texas	McKinney			event planned at Glenn Mitchell Park
Texas	Nacogdoches		18+	rally held outside Nacogdoches County Courthouse
Texas	New Braunfels		200+	event at downtown Main Plaza; sponsored by the Democratic Women of Comal County (DWCC).
Texas	Palestine			event planned at Court House Annex
Texas	Richmond			event planned at Fort Bend County Courthouse
Texas	Rockport		150	corner of Austin and Market - Concho St, Veterans Memorial Park (with a voter registration booth set up)
Texas	San Angelo		25-30	march to City Hall & Tom Green County Courthouse
Texas	San Antonio		thousands	A march began and ended at Milam Park.
Texas	San Benito			event planned at 430 N Bonham St
Texas	Sherman			event planned at Grayson County Courthouse
Texas	Spring			event planned at Woodwinds Shopping Center
Texas	Temple		40+	downtown march begun at Temple City Hall
Texas	Texarkana		4	Several Northeast Texas members of Pro Choice with Heart stood on the steps of the Texarkana federal courthouse (Texas side).
Texas	Texas City			event planned at Texas City City Hall
Texas	Tomball			event planned at Downtown Tomball, 201 South Elm
Texas	Tyler		400+	march held at T.B. Butler Fountain Plaza; participants included Joe Jaworski, a candidate for Texas Attorney General.
Texas	Vernon			event planned at Wilbarger County Court House
Texas	Waco		400	march launched at Indian Spring Park on University Parks Drive
Texas	Wichita Falls		15-20	march near Wichita Co. Courthouse
Utah	Hurricane			march planned: Dixie College - downtown
Utah	Ogden		dozens	Ogden Municipal Building, Washington Blvd - march down 25th Street
Utah	Park City			event planned at Park City Old Town, Main Street (pending)
Utah	Salt Lake City		1,000+	The rally outside Salt Lake City Hall grew from a few hundred Saturday morning to more than a thousand when the group started its march up State Street to the Utah State Capitol.
Utah	St. George			march planned from courthouse to city hall
Vermont	Brattleboro		125	rally held at Pliny Park, corner of High and Main Streets
Vermont	Middlebury			march planned: College Park (across from Shafers) - Cross Street Bridge
Vermont	Montpelier		hundreds	rally at Vermont State House lawn. Speakers included Lt. Gov. Molly Gray.
Vermont	Pawlet			sign holding event planned at Mach's Corner, Route 30
Vermont	Wilmington			event planned at Eco Spa, North Main St
Virginia	Blacksburg			march planned at Henderson Lawn, College Avenue
Virginia	Bristol		70+	Sullivan County Women's March began with a rally by the Bristol Sign, then headed up and down State St.
Virginia	Charlottesville			march planned: Charlottesville City Hall - Downtown Mall
Virginia	Independence / Galax			march planned at Old Courthouse in Independence
Virginia	Norfolk		300	a rally was held at Norfolk City Hall, followed by a march to the Chrysler Museum of Art
Virginia	Norton		40	rally at Norton City Park, followed by march down Park Ave
Virginia	Richmond		800 - 1,000	A four-mile march across the city began and ended at Diversity Richmond, on Sherwood Ave; state Sen. Jennifer McClellan (D-Richmond) spoke at the rally.
Virginia	Roanoke		150	At River's Edge Park (Open Space - South), supporters of women's rights stood along the sidewalk of Franklin Road waving signs to passing cars.
Virginia	Staunton		30	rally held at Staunton Courthouse Square.
Virginia	Virginia Beach			march planned: Mt. Trashmore Park - Town center
Virginia	Williamsburg			(Fri, Oct 1) rally planned at Williamsburg James City County Courthouse
Virginia	Winchester		dozens	Winchester-Frederick County Democrats held a Women's March Assembly outside the Shenandoah Valley Civil War Museum. Speakers included Virginia House delegate Wendy Gooditis and candidates Paul Siker and Deetzie Bayliss.
Virginia	Woodstock		100+	Northern Shenandoah Valley Women's March: Las Trancas Mexican restaurant - Historic Courthouse
Washington	Bainbridge Island		100	rally held at Waypoint Park, at the traffic lights by the ferry terminal
Washington	Bellingham		1,000	rally held at Bellingham City Hall, followed by a short march loop through downtown; 20 counter-protesters stood along the way.
Washington	Bothell			event planned at Aeipathy Patisserie, Bothell Way NE
Washington	Bremerton		40+	rally at east end of the Manette Bridge
Washington	Cheney			event planned at Safeway parking lot
Washington	Ellensburg		75	Barge Hall, Central Washington University campus - Ellensburg Lower District Courthouse - Ellensburgh City Hall
Washington	Everett		400	The march, coined as "B*tches Against Bullsh*t," ran the length of Everett Mall Way from the parking lot to 4th Avenue West & back.
Washington	Kennewick		dozens	Tri-Cities Womexn's March rally held in front of Winco, along West Clearwater Ave
Washington	Kirkland		hundreds	march begun at Kirkland City Hall
Washington	La Conner			event planned at 106 1st Street
Washington	Longview			event planned at Longview City Hall
Washington	Lynnwood		450	sign waving rally held on 196th Street SW, from 64th Ave W westward
Washington	Monroe			event planned at Lake Tye Park & Trail
Washington	Moses Lake			event planned at Vista Park I
Washington	Mount Vernon			event planned at Mount Vernon Planned Parenthood
Washington	Nanaimo			virtual event planned (on east coast of Vancouver Island in British Columbia)
Washington	Oak Harbor		96	march/protest at Beeksma-Gateway Park
Washington	Olympia		250+	Hundreds marched to the Washington State Capitol.
Washington	Port Angeles		126	vigil held at Clallam County Courthouse
Washington	Port Ludlow			event planned at grassy area at street corner of Oak Bay Road & Breaker Lane
Washington	Port Orchard			event planned at Port Orchard Waterfront Park
Washington	Port Townsend			event planned at Mountain View Commons, Blaine Street
Washington	Poulsbo		40	rally held near CVS and the Brown Bear Carwash, Hwy 305
Washington	Seattle		2,100+	Two pro-choice events were held in Seattle during the first weekend of October 2021. On Saturday, 2,000 people rallied and marched at Westlake Park; speakers included former state Rep. Kristine Reeves and former Seattle mayoral candidate Nikkita Oliver. On Sunday, a second march made its way from St. James Cathedral to the Federal Courthouse in remembrance of Rosie Jimenez; a small group of counter-protestors with loudspeakers awaited the second march.
Washington	Seaview			event planned at parking lot, corner of 39th Place and Pacific Hwy
Washington	Sequim		113	four-corner vigil held at intersection of Washington Ave & Sequim-Dungeness Way
Washington	Spokane		hundreds	Several events were held: a car rally at Tomato Street parking lot on North Division St, and a rally outside Spokane City Hall.
Washington	Stevenson			event planned at Skamania County Courthouse
Washington	Sunnyside			event planned at Fiesta Foods, Yakima Valley Hwy
Washington	Tacoma		hundreds	Wrights Park - Pierce County Superior Court
Washington	Vancouver		dozens	Women's March Vancouver WA held a car rally at Clark Community College, with a massive turnout that filled three parking lots. The procession from Fort Vancouver Way to Main Street attracted many supporters cheering and waving from the sidewalks.
Washington	Vashon			event planned at Vashon Theater parking lot
Washington	Walla Walla		100	rally held at Land Title Plaza
Washington	Wenatchee		200	rally at Memorial Park, followed by a march down Chelan Ave & North Mission Street; about 10 counter-protesters carrying anti-abortion signs arrived part way through the rally, only to be blocked by the other signs.
Washington	Yakima		100	rally at Miller Park; march through downtown Yakima
West Virginia	Charleston		227	rally held at West Virginia State Capitol
West Virginia	Clarksburg			event planned at Clarksburg courthouse, Main Street
West Virginia	Elkins			event planned at Randolph County Courthouse
West Virginia	Lewisburg			virtual event planned
West Virginia	Martinsburg		16	A march took place between City Hall and the Courthouse, followed by a rally at Aikens Center.
West Virginia	Morgantown		100+	A rally was held outside Monongalia County Courthouse, followed by a brief march downtown.
West Virginia	Wheeling		dozens	rally at Heritage Port & Veterans Memorial Amphitheater
Wisconsin	Ashland			event planned at Ashland County Courthouse
Wisconsin	Delavan			(Fri, Oct 1) candlelight vigil, Culver's restaurant
Wisconsin	Green Bay		400+	Hundreds marched from Leicht Memorial Park to Brown County Courthouse, where state Reps Lee Snodgrass and Kristina Shelton and state treasurer Sarah Godlewski (currently running for US Senate) gave speeches.
Wisconsin	Hayward			march planned: Democracy Corner - Courthouse
Wisconsin	La Crosse		150	rally held at Weigent Park (no march due to Oktoberfest festivities). State Rep. Jill Billings spoke at the event. Other attendees (not speaking) included Lt. Gov. Mandela Barnes (running for US Senate) and state Sen. Brad Pfaff (running for US Congress). US Sen. Tammy Baldwin could not attend, but sent a statement read during the program, which said the U.S. "cannot allow the clock to be turned back 50 years," referring to Roe vs. Wade.
Wisconsin	La Pointe			event planned at Joni's Beach, Main Street, Madeline Island
Wisconsin	Madison		thousands	Two opposing rallies took place at the Wisconsin State Capitol. Pro Life Wisconsin held its first ever 'March for Life Wisconsin' on the capitol steps, with advocates from every corner of the state. Hours later, Indivisible Madison led a march of more than 1,000 protesters from UW-Madison Library Mall to the Capitol.
Wisconsin	Milwaukee		hundreds	The official Women's March of Milwaukee ran along Wells Street from City Hall to the Milwaukee Courthouse. Ahead of this march, the Freedom Road Socialist Organization and several other groups launched another one downtown, from Planned Parenthood to a rally outside US Sen. Ron Johnson's office.
Wisconsin	Minocqua		~50	A sign-waving event was held at Minocqua Veterans Park, followed by a march to the bridge.
Wisconsin	Muskego		150+	sign-holding event held along Janesville Rd, near intersection with Moorland Rd. US Senate candidate Dr. Gillian Battino took part in the event.
Wisconsin	New London			event planned at New London City Hall
Wisconsin	Oshkosh		150	rally at Leach Amphitheater - march to Roe Park, where US Senatorial candidates Tom Nelson & Sarah Godlewski gave speeches.
Wisconsin	Racine		100	Racine County Courthouse - Racine City Hall. State Rep. Greta Neubauer (D-Racine) attended the event.
Wisconsin	Reedsburg			event planned at Lions/Jaycees Building, Nishan Park
Wisconsin	Sheboygan			event planned at Fountain Park
Wisconsin	Sister Bay			event planned at Waterfront Park
Wisconsin	Stevens Point			event planned at Debot Field
Wisconsin	Wausau		at least 5	rally and march held near Marathon County Courthouse
Wyoming	Casper		100	rally at David Street Station
Wyoming	Cheyenne		~50	rally held at Wyoming Supreme Court
Wyoming	Jackson			march planned: Home Ranch - Town Square
Wyoming	Lander		120	Dairyland - Centennial Park
Wyoming	Laramie			event held at Down Town Plaza
Wyoming	Riverton			event planned at City Park, 901 E Fremont
Wyoming	Torrington			sign holding event planned near the train tracks / City Hall
