= Sonoma Depot =

Museum in Sonoma, California

Sonoma
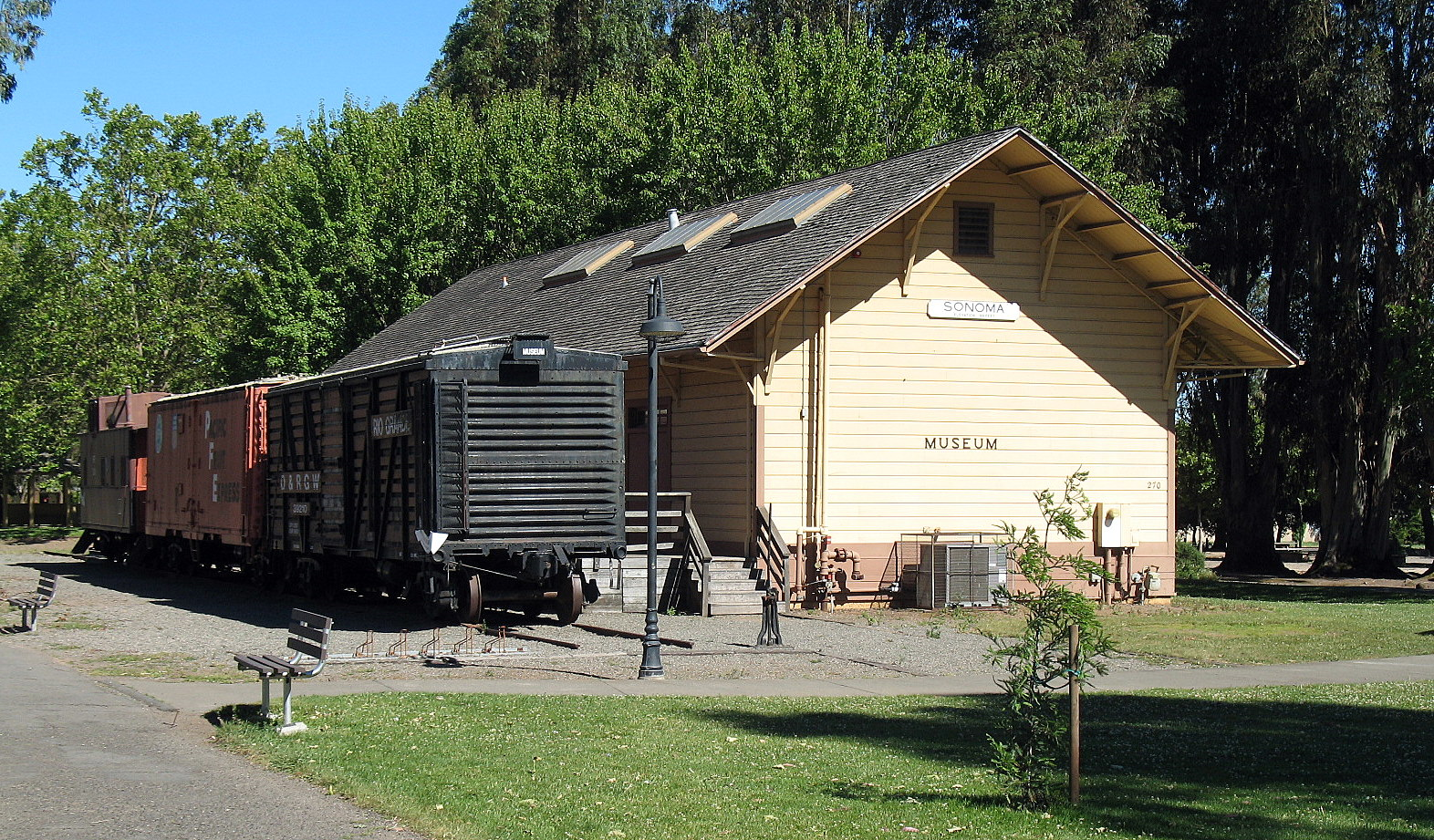

General information
- Location: 284 1st Street W, Sonoma, California

History
- Opened: c. 1875–1880
- Closed: 1942 (passenger) c. 1970 (crew operations)
- Rebuilt: 1979
- Sonoma Depot
- U.S. National Register of Historic Places
- Location within California Location within the United States
- Coordinates: 38°17′46.18″N 122°27′26.86″W
- Area: 2.82 acres (1 ha)
- Built: c. 1875–1880
- Built by: Sonoma Valley Railroad
- Architectural style: Board-and-batten
- NRHP reference No.: 75000488
- Added to NRHP: April 3, 1975
Location

Sonoma Depot was a railway station in Sonoma, California.

== History ==
Built by the Sonoma Valley Railroad some time between 1875 and 1880, (Note: The NRHP form lists a construction date as early as 1875, but many sources state 1880) the station served the narrow-gauge railway from a location on the northwest corner of Sonoma Plaza. Local pressure eventually led to relocation of the rail line and depot off of Spain Street. In 1890 the line, then owned by San Francisco and North Pacific Railroad, was diverted around town and the station building was moved to the current location, about 1,000 feet (300 m) north of its original site. Passenger service ended in 1942.

The depot was added to the National Register of Historic Places on April 3, 1975, only having been retired from serving as crew quarters a few years prior. The original building was destroyed in a fire in 1976 and was completely rebuilt in 1979. Despite this, it remains on the register. Sonoma Depot is the centerpiece of Sonoma Depot Park, and has been reopened as a museum. It is a Sonoma historic landmark.
