= Sonoma City Hall =

Historic building in Sonoma, California, U.S.

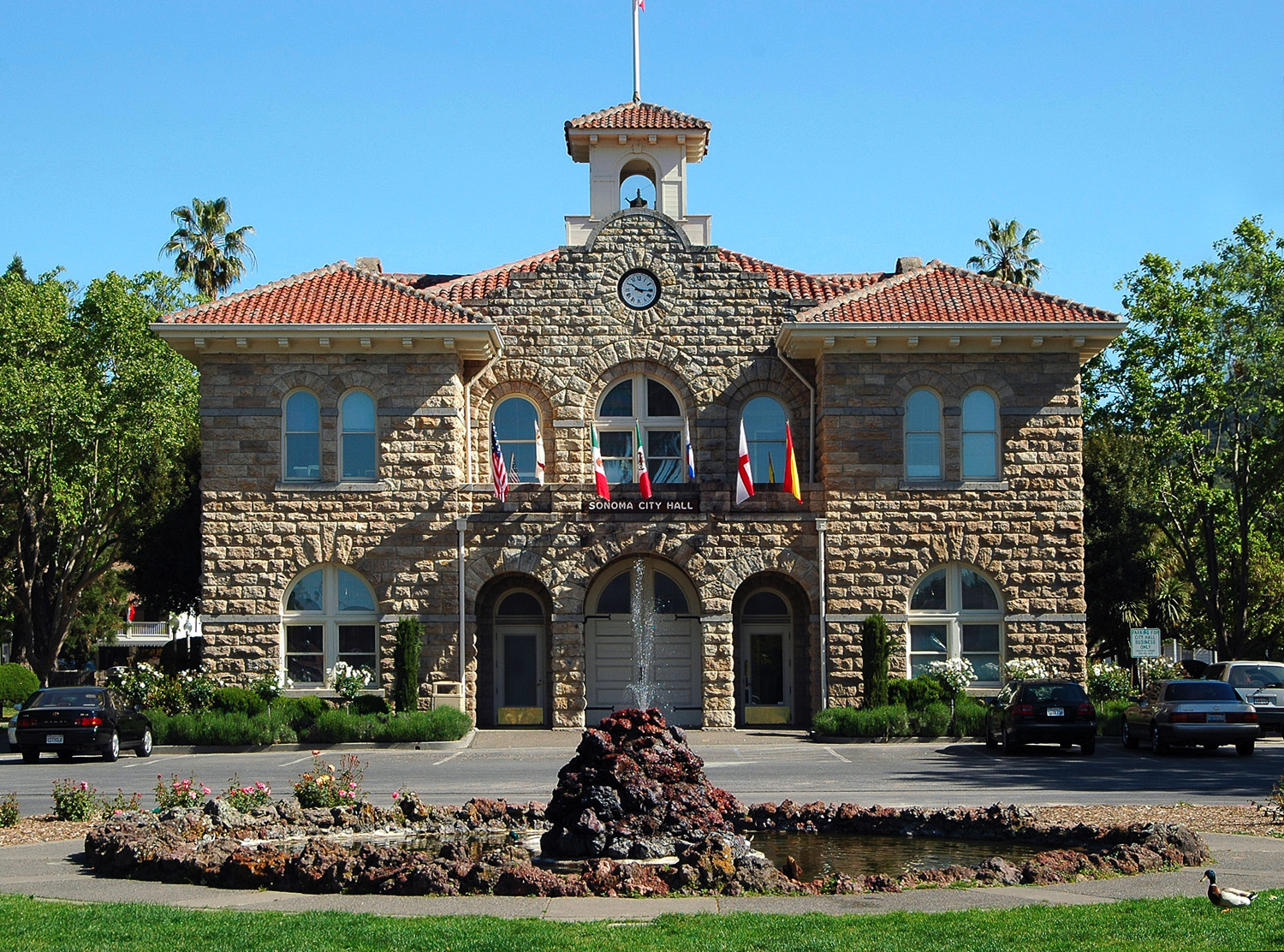
- Sonoma City Hall in Sonoma Plaza

- Location in Sonoma, California
- 38°17′18″N 122°27′27″W
- Location: 1 The Plaza, Sonoma, California, U.S.

History
- Built: 1908; 118 years ago
- Built by: W. E. Greene

Site notes
- Area: 4,689 square feet (435.6 m^{2})
- Architect: Adolph C. Lutgens
- Architectural style: Mission Revival
- Website: www.sonomacity.org/location/city-hall/
- Sonoma City Hall
- U.S. National Historic Landmark District – Contributing property
- Part of: Sonoma Plaza (ID75000489)

Sonoma City Hall is a historic municipal government building located in the Sonoma Plaza in Sonoma, California. Dedicated on September 9, 1908, the building is the city's administrative center.

== History ==
Plans for a new Sonoma City Hall began in June 1904 when architect Adolph C. Lutgens of San Francisco, was commissioned by the city trustees to design the City Hall and plans for the Sonoma Plaza.

Construction started in 1906 after the approval of a $10,000 (equivalent to $358,333 in 2025) bond issue. The cornerstone was laid on February 22, 1906.

The Sonoma fire department was once located on the first floor, with horse-drawn wagons able to exit from any side of the building. lookouts stationed at the building's tower would ring a bell to alert the town of a fire.

The Sonoma City Hall is at the center of the 8 acre Sonoma Plaza.

== Design ==
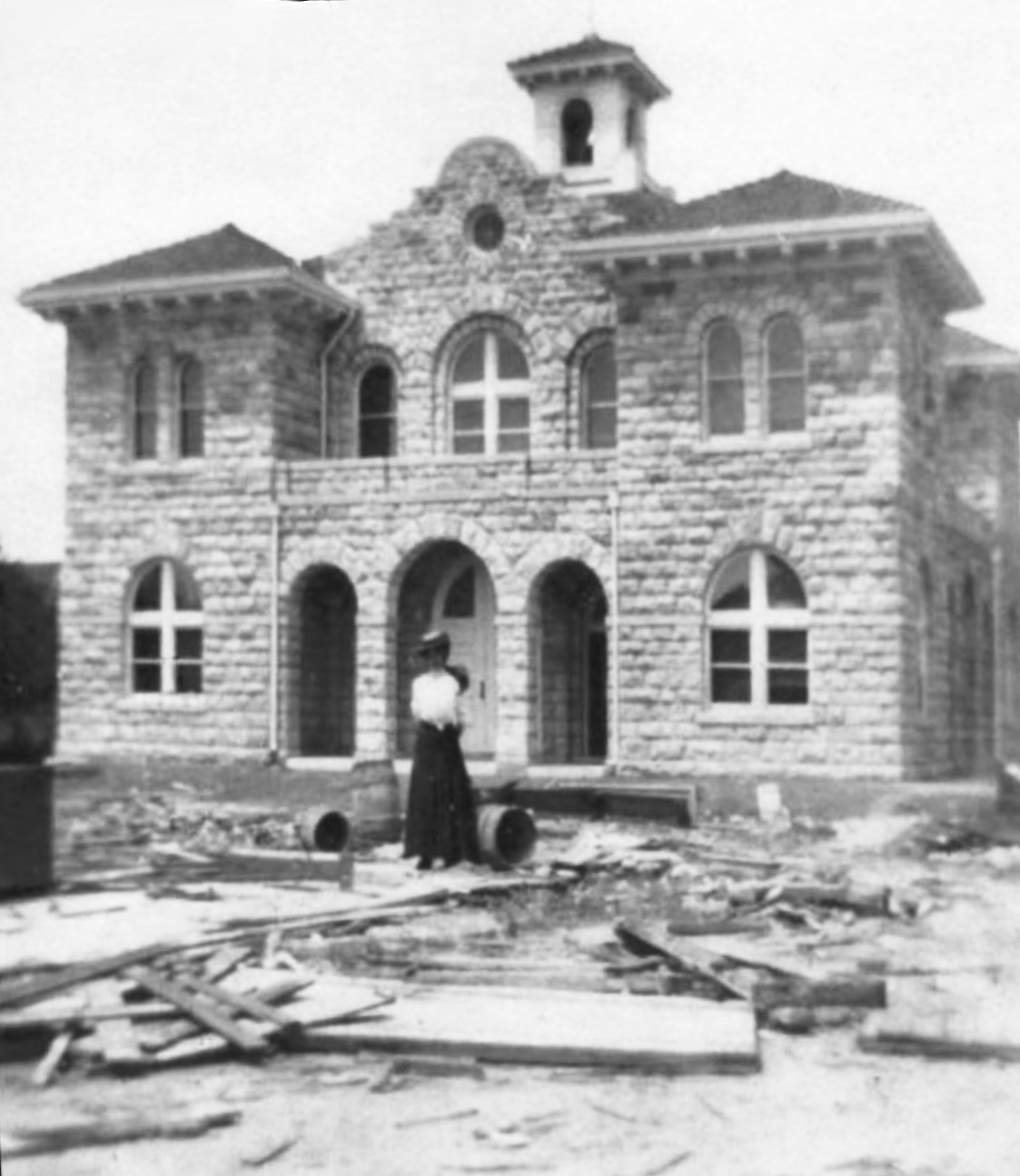
Sonoma City Hall during construction in 1906

On September 12, 1904, the Board of Trustees of Sonoma approved plans submitted by architect A. C. Lutgens for the new city hall. The Mission Revival building was designed to be constructed from basalt stone, featuring two stories, a tower, and a tiled roof. The interior was planned to be made of white pine and would house rooms for the city officials. The design included four identical sides, each with an arched doorway with tall windows.

== Public demonstrations ==
On May 30, 2020 more than 100 protesters gathered in Sonoma Plaza, marched around town, and laid face down with their hands behind their backs in front of the Sonoma City Hall to protest the murder of George Floyd.

== See also ==
- Sonoma historic landmarks
