= Gundlach Bundschu =

Historic winery in California

Coordinates: 38°16′51″N 122°25′1″W

Gundlach Bundschu Winery
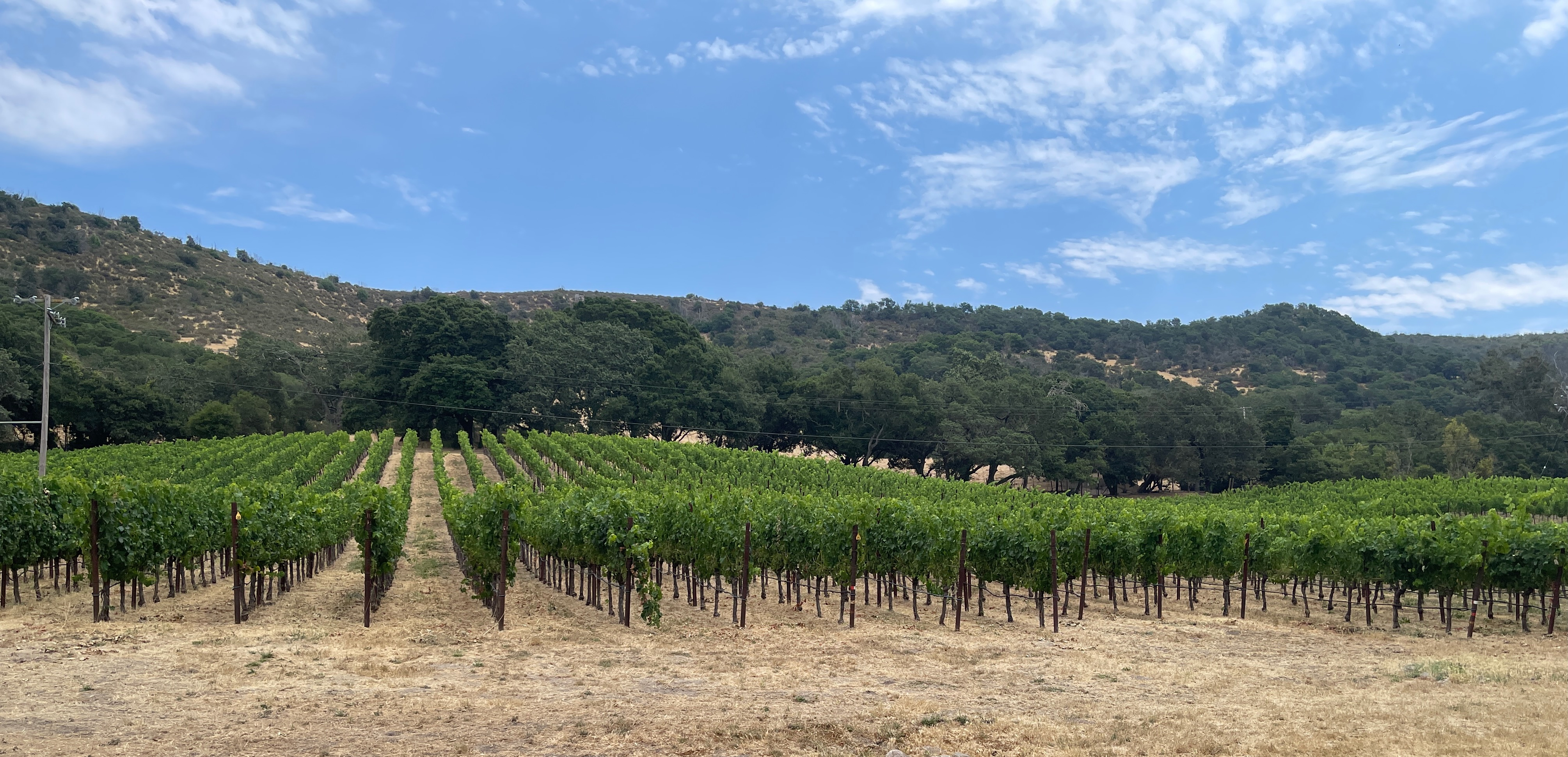
- Gundlach Bundschu Vineyard
- Location: Sonoma, California, USA
- Appellation: Sonoma County AVA
- Formerly: J. Gundlach & Co., Gundlach Bundschu Wine Company
- Founded: 1858
- Cases/yr: 40,000
- Varietals: Gewurztraminer, Cabernet Sauvignon, Chardonnay
- Distribution: national
- Tasting: open to the public
- Website: www.gunbun.com

Gundlach Bundschu Winery is a historic winery and an outdoor concert venue located in Sonoma County. It is California's oldest continuously family-owned winery, and is the second oldest winery after Buena Vista Winery (established months earlier by Agoston Haraszthy). It is still owned and operated by the founder's heirs and today led by the sixth generation, Jeff Bundschu. The winery's 320-acre (130 ha) regenerative organic certified estate vineyard, named Rhinefarm by Bavarian-born Jacob Gundlach in 1858, is located within the Sonoma Valley AVA of Sonoma County, at the crossroads of the Sonoma Valley, Los Carneros AVA and Napa Valley AVA, along the Mayacamas Mountains. They specialize in estate-driven, organically farmed Bordeaux reds and cool climate varietal wines.

== History ==
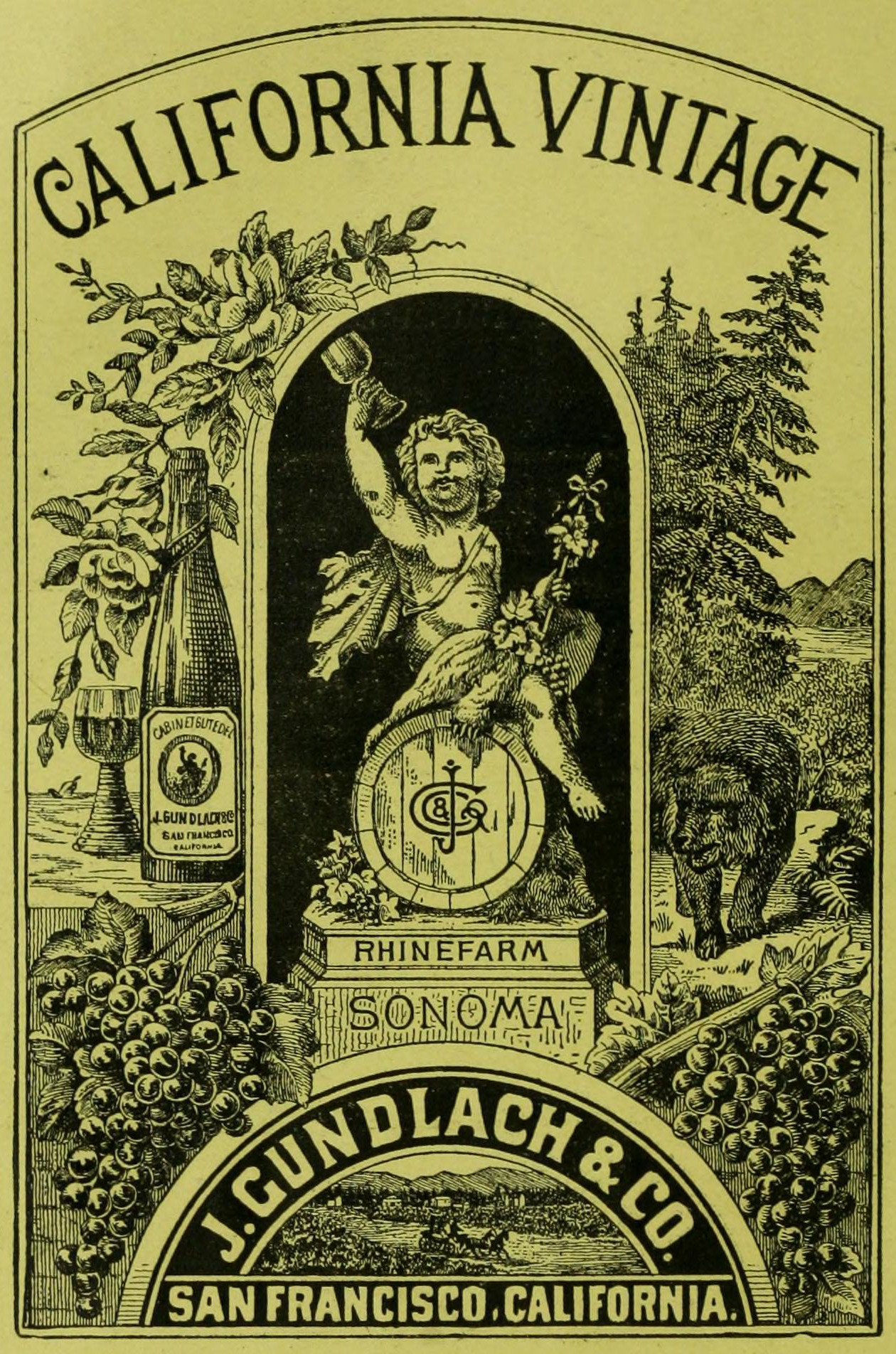
1889 advertisement for wine by J. Gundlach & Co.

The company was founded by Jacob Gundlach in 1858. Charles Bundschu, from Mannheim, Germany, joined the company in 1868, and became part of the family when he married Jacob Gundlach’s daughter Francisca in 1875. J. Gundlach & Co. grew significantly over the next 30 years, distributing Rhine wines from its factory at the corner of Second Street and Bryant Street in what is now the Soma District in San Francisco, California and its headquarters nearby on Market Street at Second. There was a New York branch as well. After Jacob’s death in 1894, the company was renamed Gundlach Bundschu. By the time of the great earthquake of 1906 the company was a major international wine producer, distributing over 250,000 cases of mostly fortified wine per year.

The earthquake destroyed the winery's production facilities, one million gallons of wine, and even Charles Bundschu's home. The winery never regained its earlier stature as a major producer of bulk wine. Instead the company regrouped and moved operations to its vineyards in Sonoma County. The company suffered another setback during Prohibition, when alcohol was made illegal in the United States. Unable to sell wine, the company sold grapes to other wineries for sacramental wine use and raised cattle instead under Towle Bundschu, the grandson of the founder. Walter, of the fourth generation of Bundschus, planted more grapes after the repeal of Prohibition, but the company did not begin producing wine again until the early 1970s.

Fifth-generation Jim Bundschu developed a plan to restore the family winery in 1969, with the first modern vintage in 1973. Unable to obtain premium prices for Sonoma County grapes at the time despite their high quality (and correspondingly lower yield), he decided that the only way to capitalize on the vineyards' value was to produce his own premium-level wine. Production was initially 70,000 bottles per year but dropped in the late 1990s, as the company focused on the quality of estate-grown Rhinefarm wines. In 1997, the Bundschu family acquired 140 acres (0.57 km^{2}) of land adjacent to the existing historic Rhinefarm Vineyard. Jeff became president of the winery in 2000. Production was also decreased and is today, around 40,000 cases per year.

The also serve as a music venue, with two performance stages. Gundlach Bundschu has hosted the Huichica Festival, and have partnered with music promoter (((folkYEAH))).

In September 2026, the winery filed for Chapter 11 bankruptcy protection, citing over $37 million in debt.

== Winery and estate ==
Approximately 150 acres (0.61 km^{2}) of Rhinefarm estate have been planted over the last 10 years, including 25 acres (100,000 m^{2}) of Pommard 5, Dijon 115, 667 and 777 clone Pinot Noir on the valley floor and 110 acres (0.45 km^{2}) of Bordeaux varieties planted on the rocky slopes of Arrowhead Mountain, part of the Mayacamas. Rhinefarm Vineyard now has 320 acres (1.3 km^{2}) under vine, organically farmed in more than 50 distinct blocks. Joe Uhr has been the winemaker since 2017.
