= Charles Bundschu =

German winemaker (1842–1910)

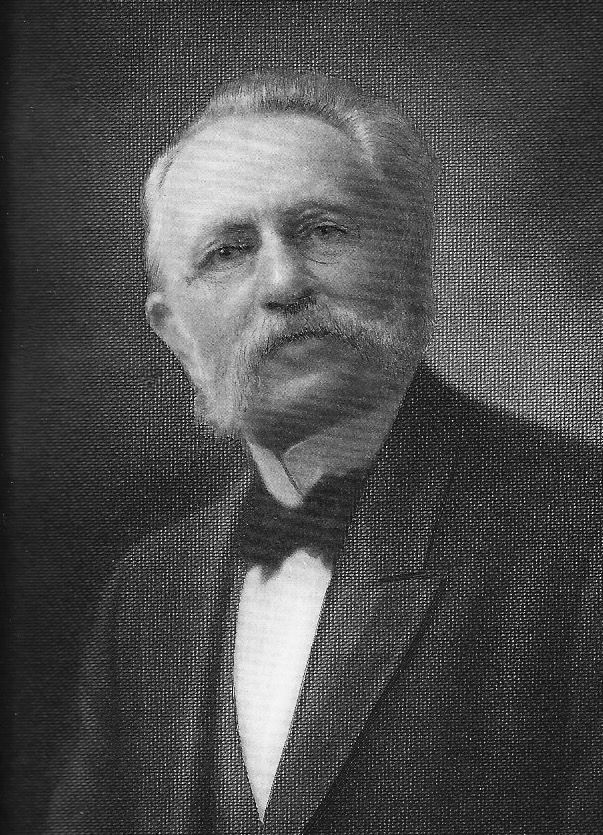
- Born: 1842; Mannheim, Germany
- Died: September 30, 1910 (aged 68); San Francisco, California, U.S.
- Occupation: Viticulture
- Known for: Gundlach Bundschu
- Spouse: Frances Gundlach
- Children: 6

Charles Bundschu (1842 – September 30, 1910) was a German-born winemaker in San Francisco. Bundschu was part of the family that owns and operates the Gundlach Bundschu winery, located in Sonoma, California. The winery, established in 1858, is one of the oldest continuously family-owned wineries in California. Bundschu played an important role in maintaining and developing the winery through challenging times, including the 1906 San Francisco earthquake.

== Early life ==
Bundschu was born in 1842, in Mannheim, North Baden, Germany. He went to a university in Germany.

== Career ==
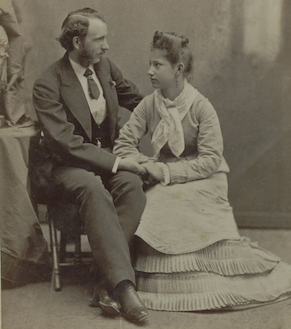
Charles Bundschu and Frances Gundlach, ca. 1868

In 1862, Bundschu immigrated from Mannheim, Germany to San Francisco, California and was employed in the produce business. He met Jacob Gundlach (1850-1894), who had purchased 400 acres (160 ha) of Rancho Huichica in Sonoma, California and established "Rhinefarm" vineyard and winery in 1858.

Bundschu joined the company in 1868. On September 9, 1875, he married Francisca, the daughter of Jacob Gundlach. The couple had six children.

Gundlach and Bundschu emerged as early vintners in California's winemaking industry. Bundschu studied the science of viticulture and applied it to the Rhinefarm winery.

In 1890, Bundschu was appointed by the Governor to the Board of State Viticultural Commissioners, and later the California Promotion Committee. He helped found the Altenheim (German for Elder’s Home or old people’s home), in Fruitvale, Oakland, California, and was a member of the Bohemian Club. He was president of the Loring Singing Society and one of the founders and vice-president and director of the San Francisco Merchants' Association. He became a leader among German-American citizens in San Francisco, and was president of the German Benevolent Society. One of his last civic activities took place in July 1895, when he organize the German festival and ceremony at the installation of the Goethe–Schiller Monument in San Francisco's Golden Gate Park.

Bundschu founded the Bacchus Club, a wine and literary society. In 1896, the club staged a play near Rhinefarm called The Vitage Festival, written by Ben Weed. Today, the club allows members to receive discounts on wine.

Bundschu published articles and periodicals on the cultivation of the California grapes. He was later known for his creative writings. The San Francisco Chronicle described him as "a poet of international fame, having written poems of real genius in both the English and German languages."

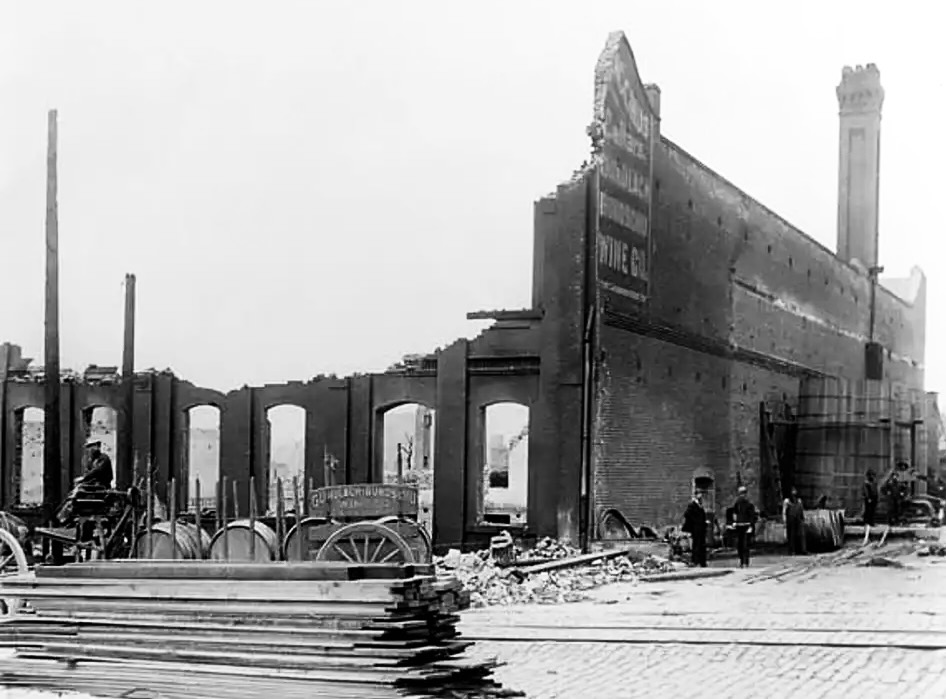
Gundlach Bundschu winery building destroyed in 1906 San Francisco earthquake

On April 18, 1906, the 1906 San Francisco earthquake destroyed the winery's production facilities in San Francisco, including the million-gallon winery warehouse, and Bundschu's home and library on Telegraph Hill. On April 22, Bundschu wrote a letter to his brother that described the fire. He said, "Less than an hour after the quake a crew at their great cellar on Bryant Street was able to fill two wagons with books, business papers and other items. Before the sun had set the huge building was destroyed by the advancing inferno." Bundschu moved the winery operations from San Francisco to its vineyards in Sonoma. He spent the last years of his life building the business back to its former prominence.

== Death ==
Bundschu died on September 30, 1910, at his home in San Francisco, from an illness he developed during the 1906 fire. His legacy endures in the Gundlach Bundschu Winery that carries his name.

== See also ==
- List of Bohemian Club members
