= Bartholomew Park Winery =

Winery in California

Coordinates: 38.30177°N 122.42484°W

- Location: Sonoma, California, United States
- Founded: 1994
- Cases/yr: 4,500
- Varietals: Cabernet Sauvignon, Merlot
- Website: http://www.bartpark.com

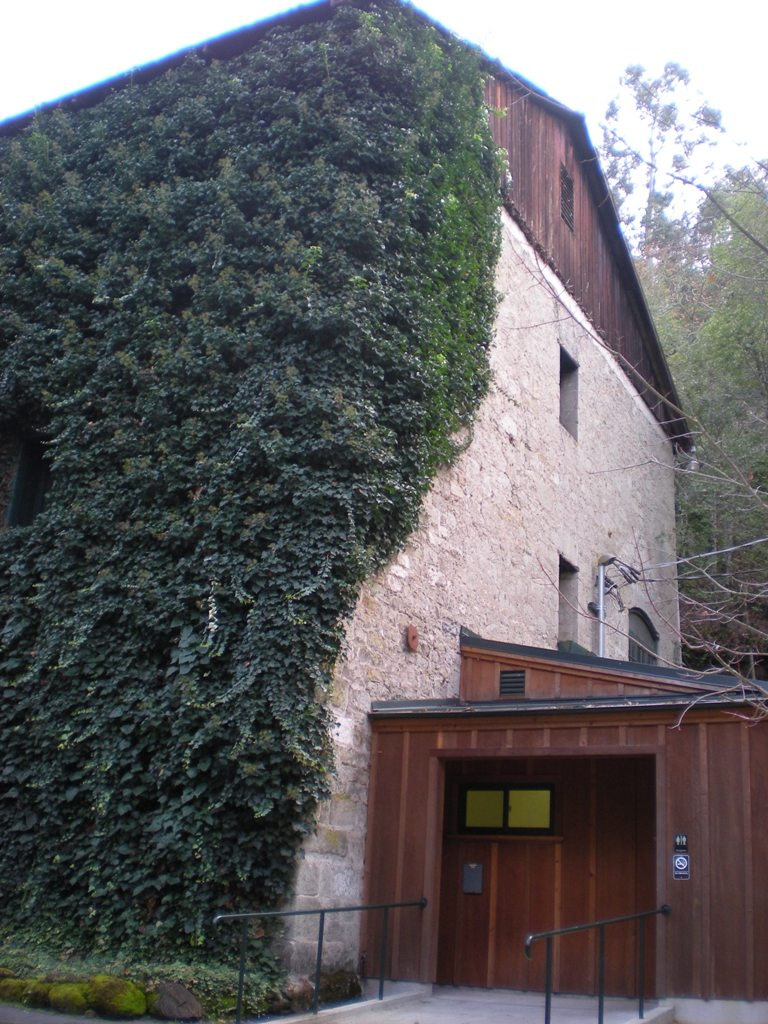
Bartholomew Park Winery

Bartholomew Park Winery is a winery located in Sonoma, California, United States. The winery is located on the former site of Agoston Haraszthy's Buena Vista Winery and eventually, in the 1920s, Sonoma Valley Hospital. In 1941 the site was purchased by Frank Bartholomew. He eventually sold his portion of Buena Vista Winery and retained the majority of his vineyard land around the area. In 1973 he opened Hacienda Wine Cellars on the property. That brand was sold in 1973 and the former Hacienda building (which was the former hospital) was turned into Bartholomew Park Winery and the Sonoma Valley Wine Museum, by 1994. Today, the winery produces about 4,500 cases of wine a year and focuses primarily on Cabernet Sauvignon and Merlot wines.
