= Wisconsin Ledge AVA =

American Viticultural Area in Wisconsin

Coordinates: 44°25′36″N 87°40′01″W

Wisconsin Ledge
- Wine region
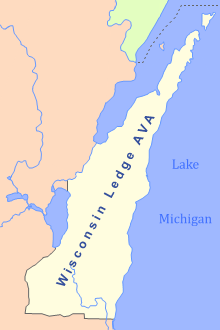
- Door Peninsula region of eastern Wisconsin
- Type: American Viticultural Area
- Year established: 2012
- Country: United States
- Part of: Wisconsin
- Other regions in Wisconsin: Lake Wisconsin AVA, Upper Mississippi River Valley AVA
- Growing season: 164 days
- Climate region: Region II
- Heat units: 2,612 GDD units
- Precipitation (annual average): 28 to 35 in (710–890 mm)
- Soil conditions: Unsorted till and stratified gravel, sand, and clay
- Total area: 3,800 sq mi (2,400,000 acres)
- Size of planted vineyards: 500 acres (200 ha)
- No. of vineyards: 14
- Grapes produced: Brianna, Edelweiss, Frontenac, La Crescent, Maréchal Foch, Marquette, Niagara, Petite Pearl, Seyval Blanc, St. Croix, St. Pepin
- No. of wineries: 24

Wisconsin Ledge is an American Viticultural Area (AVA) located in northeast Wisconsin along the western end of the Niagara Escarpment (locally referred to as "The Ledge") within Door, Kewaunee, Manitowoc, Sheboygan, Ozaukee, Washington, Dodge, Fond du Lac, Calumet, Outagamie, and Brown counties. It was established as the nation's 203^{rd} and the state's third appellation on March 22, 2012 by the Alcohol and Tobacco Tax and Trade Bureau (TTB), Treasury after reviewing the petition submitted by Steven J. DeBaker of Trout Springs Winery in Greenleaf, Wisconsin, on behalf of himself and local vintners, proposing the viticultural area named "Wisconsin Ledge."

The AVA lies on the Door Peninsula, a 138-mile-long (222 km) by 55-mile-wide (89 km) landform, encompassing 2.4 million acres (3,800 sq mi) within the state borders. It is also ranked as the nation's 12th largest viticultural area. Wisconsin Ledge's formation follows the state's second AVA, the gargantuan 19.1 million acres (29,914 sq mi) multi-state Upper Mississippi River Valley, established in 2009, expanding across Minnesota, Iowa, Illinois and Wisconsin. The state's initial AVA, Lake Wisconsin, was established in 1994. At the outset, Wisconsin Ledge had 320 acres (130 ha) under vine with plans for an additional 70 acres (28 ha). Currently, there are 500 acres (200 ha) of cultivation and 24 bonded wineries.
Wisconsin Ledge's glacial soils are made up of gravel, sand and clay over limestone bedrock. An aquifer below the AVA provides mineral-rich ground water to the vines, encouraging deep root growth. The plant hardiness zone ranges from 5a to 6a.

== History ==
In the early interval between the Jurassic period, about 201.4 million years ago and today, all the forces of erosion were at work creating much of our scenery. In the Paleozoic Era, the edges of the rock layers (Michigan Basin bowls) were leveled off and their rocks exposed. The thin edges of the hard resistant formations were worn away so that the outer edges are now high cliffs and escarpments. Such a structure, a short steep slope over the exposed edges of rock layers and a long gentle slope in the opposite direction down the top of the strata, is called a cuesta. The summit of the cuesta can be miles in length. Although this land mass was formed prior to glaciations, it was dramatically altered by the ice cover and melt water. The visible effects of the glaciation of the Cuesta were generated during the most recent of the stages of Wisconsin glaciation. During this period, the Cuesta was covered by an ice sheet 6,600 feet (2,000 m) thick and as the glaciers receded, large rock and boulders with fragments were carried away, sometimes for miles and found in rural areas at a long distance from this event. These limestone deposits, along with finely ground particles, called till, were deposited in great sheets, called till plains. This deposition of a mix of till and large rock fragments result in massive moraines along the landscape sometime rising up to 66 ft (20 m) above the surrounding landscape. These areas were occupied by several Native American tribes throughout history including the Winnebago, Oneida, and Algonquin prior to European settlement beginning in the 1630s. Historic sites abound within the area surrounding the Wisconsin Ledge in Wisconsin, with as many as 500 sites being identified by the State Historical Society and National Register of Historic Places. Additionally, numerous archeological sites revealing "a rich and varied cultural heritage of the region" such as the Red Banks district, with regard to the historic Indians, and Euro-American contact with the landfall of Jean Nicolet, and the sites of the Point au Sable region, make this area very special.
Historically the northern portion of the Ledge area has been primarily used agriculturally for crops ranging from grains, to fruits, with cherry and apple orchards dominating the peninsular landscape. At the outset, over 200 acres (81 ha) of vineyards were yielding fruit, with another 100 acres (40 ha) proposed for the following year. Many of the wines produced have already won prestigious national recognition, including a Silver at the San Diego International Wine Competition; a Silver at the San Francisco International Wine Competition; a Gold at the Michigan Culinary Classic; and Gold at the Indy Invitational Wine Lover's Classic. Articles from The Country Today refer to the area as "Napa North" and "Wine Country."

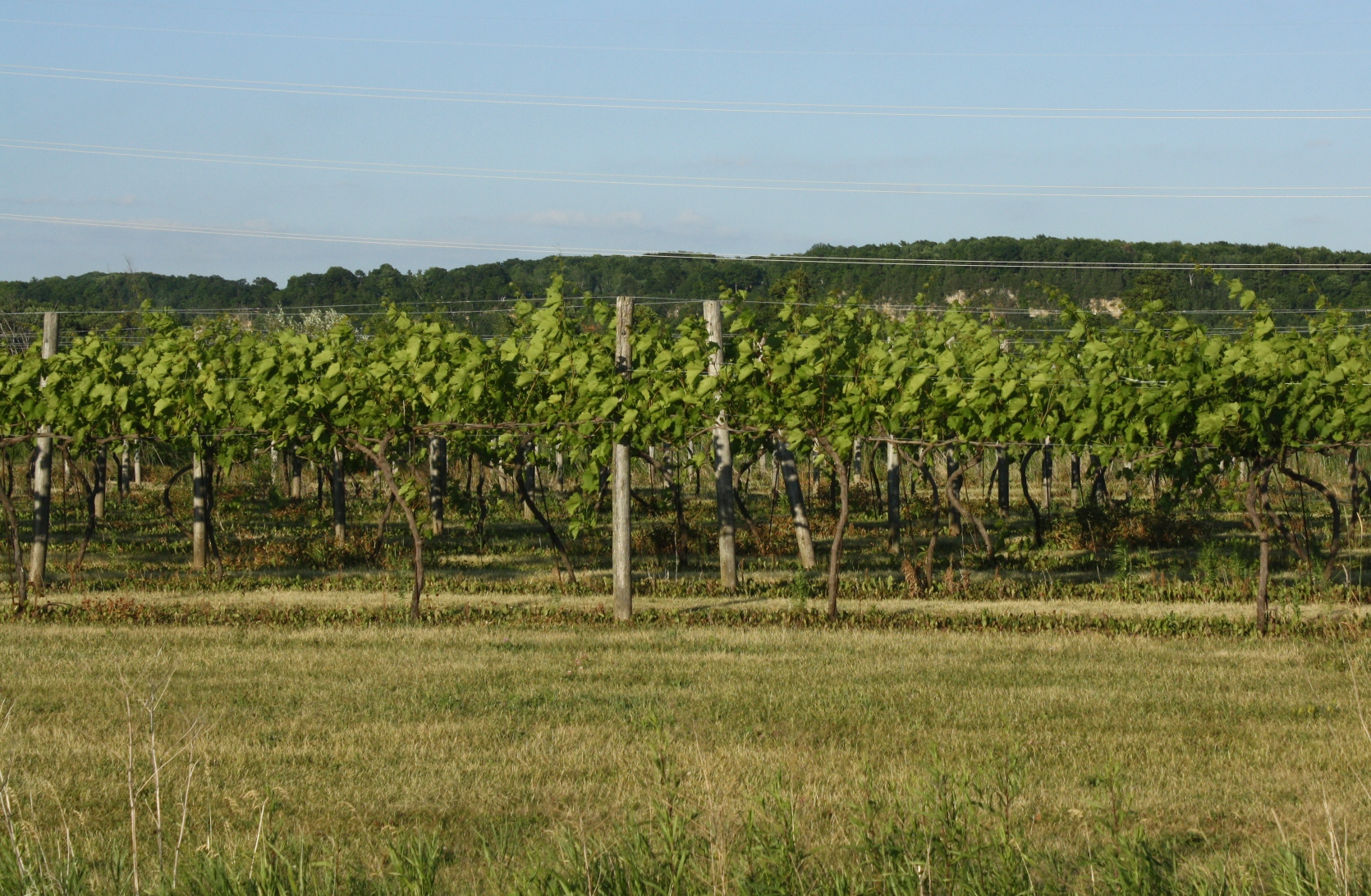
Brown County vineyards

== Terroir ==
The distinguishing features of the Wisconsin Ledge viticultural area are its geology, geography, climate, hydrology, and soils. Given that the viticultural area is surrounded by water to the east, north, and northwest, TTB noted that the sections below only contrast the distinguishing features of the viticultural area to the surrounding areas to the south, southwest, and west.

=== Topography ===
The topography of Wisconsin Ledge is the result of ancient glacial movement over the region. The land on the peninsula slopes gently upward from the shores of Lake Michigan to the top of the Ledge, before dropping sharply off into Green Bay. Most of the vineyards lie on these eastern-facing slopes that benefit from constant air movement from Lake Michigan, which stores warmth during the summer. The presence of the lake produces a vacuum of sorts during the growing season: warm air over the lake rises, drawing colder air off the land creating offshore breezes. Cold air cannot settle over the vineyards with the constant flow of warmer air, making the growing season here longer than in other parts of Wisconsin.

=== Geography ===
The Wisconsin Ledge viticultural area has a gently rolling landscape of drifted, mantled plains broken by areas of steep slope. The upland elevations mostly contain dolomitic limestone and layers of glacial till, which are beneficial for grape-growing, according to the petition. In addition, the higher elevations of the Ledge region prevent other sediments from the lower north, south, and west elevations from spreading to the upland area. The Niagara Cuesta, which includes the Ledge region, ends at Lake Winnebago, Green Bay, and the Fox River, which generally form the western portion of the boundary line of the viticultural area. To the west is the lower Magnesian Cuesta, which has flat and swampy lowland features, according to the petition. The USGS maps submitted with the petition show that elevations vary by approximately 600 feet (180 m) within the Wisconsin Ledge viticultural area. TTB notes that the lowest elevations, at about 580 feet (180 m), are along the shorelines of Green Bay, which forms much of the western portion of the boundary line, and Lake Michigan, which forms all of the northern and eastern portions of the boundary line. The highest elevations, at approximately 1,060 feet (320 m), are located in the southwest interior part of the Wisconsin Ledge viticultural area, near Herman Center in Dodge County, according to USGS maps. The petition states that the upland part of the Niagara Cuesta landform, which is a geological mass of thick, hard, continuous limestone bedrock, extends from the northern tip of Door County southward toward the state line. As noted above, the Wisconsin Ledge viticultural area is in the northern, higher elevation part of the Niagara Cuesta, and the viticultural area includes most of the Wisconsin portion of the Niagara Escarpment ridgeline. The Niagara Escarpment crest, at 1,060 feet (320 m) in elevation, distinguishes the Ledge region. To the south of the viticultural area, the Niagara Escarpment decreases in elevation so that it is no longer a conspicuous topographical feature near Waukesha and Oconomowoc. The petition adds that the broad sloping portion of the Niagara Cuesta that is within the viticultural area is the portion that is best suited for viticulture, largely because of the glacial till covering in the area. According to the petition, the land in the surrounding regions does not contain the dolomitic limestone and thin layers of glacial till that are found in the Wisconsin Ledge viticultural area due to the decreased glaciations and differing geological history in the lower elevation regions to the west and south. The petition further explains that the topography changes significantly at Cedarburg which is to the south of the Wisconsin Ledge viticultural area. From that point, the landscape slowly declines in elevation to a near- flat, dissected topography that includes urban areas. The petition also states that the southwestern portion of the boundary line separates the Wisconsin Ledge viticultural area from the relatively flat lowlands of the Rock River, Lake Winnebago, and the Green Bay area to the west of the Wisconsin Ledge viticultural area.

=== Climate ===
The Wisconsin Ledge viticultural area has a significant marine influence, which results in moderated climatic conditions that are conducive to viticulture. The marine influence from Lake Michigan, Lake Winnebago, and Green Bay, along with the elevated ledge landform, creates a growing season that is generally longer and warmer than in areas outside of the viticultural area, the petition explains. As described in the petition, the large bodies of water that surround much of the Wisconsin Ledge viticultural area serve as heat storage tanks that moderate the near-shore land climates ("Confront Climate Change in the Great Lakes Region," a consensus opinion by the Union of Concerned Scientists–The Ecological Society of America). The petition further explains that the waters of the lakes and Green Bay warm and cool more slowly with the changing seasons than the surrounding land, moderating the summer mean maximum and winter mean minimum temperatures in the Wisconsin Ledge viticultural area. The petition notes that climatic conditions to the west of the Wisconsin Ledge viticultural area are not temperature-moderated by the warm winds from Lake Michigan, Lake Winnebago, and Green Bay because the wind speeds west of the Ledge region drop significantly further inland to the west of Lake Winnebago and Green Bay. The petition also states that the slow seasonal changes in water temperatures surrounding the Ledge region reduce the chance for late spring frosts or early fall freezes. In addition, according to the petition, the slope and elevation changes of the Ledge create an air circulation movement pattern that reduces frost damage occurrences, mildew, and other humidity-related grape-growing problems. By contrast, to the south of the Ledge area, cold air masses pool on the flat, low terrain and are unable to drain eastward into Lake Michigan, and the areas to the west of the viticultural area lack the elevational differences that are necessary for climate migration, according to the petition. The climate in the Wisconsin Ledge viticultural area provides an average annual temperature that is only about 2 °F (−17 °C) higher than the other listed locations in the State, but the temperatures in the viticultural area are significantly warmer than the surrounding areas in September, with an average of 54 GDD units more than the locations outside of the viticultural area during the month. The petition explains that the cumulative effect of the moderated climate and warm September temperatures in the viticultural area creates an average grape growing season that is longer than in other parts of Wisconsin. The petition states that the data, with an average growing season in the viticultural area of 164 days that on average runs from May 3 to October 11 annually, whereas in the rest of Wisconsin, the growing season averages only 136 days, running on average from May 18 to September 22 annually. As a result, the growing season continues in the Wisconsin Ledge viticultural area for an average of three weeks longer than in other areas, resulting in additional hang time for grapes to reach maturity prior to harvest.

=== Hydrology ===
The Wisconsin Ledge viticultural area is primarily underlain by the Eastern Dolomite Aquifer. The petition states that Dolomite resembles limestone and contains ground water. The yield of water from the aquifer depends on the porosity of the carbonate rock and frequency of cracks or fractures. The unique rock formations and water patterns of the Eastern Dolomite Aquifer vary from other areas of the state, which are primarily covered by the Sand and Gravel Aquifer, according to the petition. In addition, mineral rich water and dolomite limestone, which the petition notes are important factors for viticulture, are common in the Wisconsin Ledge region. The petition explains that the carbonate rock and porous karst features of the Eastern Dolomite Aquifer enhance the delivery and availability of water and nutrients to grapevines because nutrients are added to the water as it travels through the porous rock, which then enriches area soils and grapevines. Further, according to the petition, the Eastern Dolomite Aquifer has a constant 50 °F (10 °C) water temperature, which provides a moderating effect that yields more consistent soil temperatures. The petition also notes that early spring and late fall fogs form from the constant 50 °F (10 °C) groundwater that reacts to the much colder air temperatures; those fogs blanket the area and help protect the vineyards from damaging freezes and frosts. The petition states that the Eastern Dolomite Aquifer is unique to the eastern-most part of Wisconsin, including the Wisconsin Ledge region and the adjacent parts of Lake Michigan. As described in the petition, the aquifer rock formation rises to the Earth's surface in the Ledge region and then eventually dips eastward under the waters of Lake Michigan. By comparison, the Sand and Gravel Aquifer that covers most of Wisconsin is easily contaminated because the top of the aquifer is also the land surface, according to the petition. In addition, the petition notes that water flow in the Sand and Gravel Aquifer is highly variable due to the spatial variability of the sand and gravel deposits, and water from the aquifer contains fewer nutrients because it has a short residence time in the aquifer and discharges close to the recharge point of the aquifer.

=== Geology ===
The Wisconsin Ledge viticultural area is a geomorphologic land mass that formed over 420 million years ago. The area was shaped by repeated glaciations, including a 6,600-foot-thick (2,000 m) ice sheet and climatic erosion that altered the landform and brought in igneous and metamorphic rocks from other places. The petition explains that, in the time between the Jurassic Era and today, erosion created much of the Ledge region landscape. During the Paleozoic Era, the edges of rock layers (Michigan Basin bowls) were leveled off and exposed. The thin outer edges of the hard, resistant formations eventually wore away, leaving high cliffs and escarpments, according to the petition. The petition further explains that the glacial ice sheet left deposits of unsorted till (finely ground particles), or boulder clay, and stratified gravel, sand, and clay throughout the region. The glacial deposition of till and rock fragments created massive moraines that rise up to 66 feet (20 m) above the surrounding landscape. As the glaciers slowly receded, limestone and till were deposited on the surface to form till plains. The petition states that the resulting broad sloping cuesta is viticulturally beneficial because the glacial till and well-drained strata are well-suited for grape-growing, especially when combined with the light breezes and moderated climate due to the surrounding bodies of water. South of the Wisconsin Ledge viticultural area are the Southeast Glacial Plains. The petition states that, although the southeast plains area received glacial deposits, its topography is more discontinuous and its soils are more fertile than those of the Wisconsin Ledge region because it is covered with silt-loam loess cap. The USGS maps submitted with the petition show that the lowlands around the Rock River, Lake Winnebago, and Green Bay are to the west of the Wisconsin Ledge viticultural area. The floor of the lowlands is composed of the back slope of Galena- Black River limestone. The limestone is mainly buried beneath glacial drift, but it is evident in some surface areas near quarries. The area to the west of the Wisconsin Ledge viticultural area is generally flat and includes Green Bay, several lakes, and many small ponds and streams, according to the USGS maps. Further west of the Ledge region and the lowlands, lakes, and Green Bay are the Magnesian and Black River Cuestas. These cuestas are a part of the driftless area of southwest Wisconsin, which escaped the most recent glaciations and residual drift. The petition notes that the lack of glacial activity to the west contrasts with the geological history to the east in the Ledge region.

=== Soil ===
The soils deposited in the Ledge region by the glacial drift are unsorted till and stratified gravel, sand, and clay which are well-suited for viticulture. As stated in the petition, these soils have ample permeability with average to steep slopes and contain fragments of local limestone, shale, and igneous and metamorphic rocks that the glacial ice sheet brought to the region. Although the soils in the Ledge region vary somewhat, they generally come from glacial drift, with Miami and Coloma loams as the two general soil types in the Wisconsin Ledge viticultural area, according to the petition. The petition further states that the ground moraine that covers most of the Wisconsin Ledge viticultural area has a variable, slightly rolling topography of drift-mantled plains. Composed largely of till, the ground moraine also contains small amounts of stratified sand, gravel, and a base of dolomite bedrock. The petition explains that the soils to the south and west of the Wisconsin Ledge viticultural area have less glacial till and fewer rock formations. Those soils are sandier with less limestone and more organic composition (generally rich fertile black loam) as compared to the prairie soils and sandy plains that are common in the Wisconsin Ledge.

== See also ==
- American wine
- List of American Viticultural Areas
- Wisconsin (wine)
