= Phil Coturri =

American viticulturalist and vineyard manager

- Born: California, United States
- Occupation: Viticulturalist
- Years active: 1967-present
- Known for: Pioneering organic and biodynamic farming in California

Phil Coturri is an American viticulturalist. As a vineyard manager, Coturri has been recognized as pioneering organic and biodynamic farming in California. He is the chief executive officer of Enterprise Vineyard Management and co-owner of Winery Sixteen 600.

== Early life ==
Phil Coturri grew up in San Francisco, California. His family also had a weekend home in Glen Ellen, California. An Italian-American, Coturri's grandfather was from Lucca, Italy. Coturri made wine with his grandfather as a young man. Coturri met Arden Kremer, his future wife, in 1976, while the two were working the wine harvest, picking grapes, in Kenwood, California.

== Career ==
In 1967, Coturri, alongside his brother Tony, assisted their father in planting 2-acres of vines at the family's Glen Ellen house. That first planting triggered his interest in viticulture. During his early career in viticulture, in the 1970s, he used fertilizers, pesticides and herbicides. While farming, he was poisoned by a herbicide called paraquat. He became sick from the toxins. This poisoning was another contributing factor in Coturri exploring organic viticulture and agriculture. He left behind conventional agriculture and dedicated his work to organic practices.

=== Philosophy ===
"If an organic tomato is going to taste better than a hot-house tomato, an organic grape is going to taste better than a conventionally-grown grape." -Phil Coturri

He believes that the way he farms the vineyards he manages impacts the ecological systems of the surrounding environment, including the San Francisco Bay. He also believes that organic grapes produce better quality wine. He is a staunch proponent against RoundUp.

Coturri utilizes organic farming practices in his vineyard management. No fertilizer or synthetic herbicides or pesticides are used in the planting and management process. He utilizes cover crops and encourages the use of integrated pest management with the installation of beehives, for pollinating, and bird boxes, to house owls and hawks. Other examples of organic practices include distributing oyster shells throughout rocky soil vineyards to add calcium to the soil. Additionally, Coturri participates in biodynamic farming, even though he does not believe in the spiritual belief system associated with the biodynamic process.

=== Vineyard management ===
The first organic vineyard that Coturri managed was Dos Limones Vineyard, owned by Myron Freiberg, in 1974. Coturri founded Enterprise Vineyard Management in 1979 and is chief executive officer. In 1983, Coturri planted Cabernet Sauvignon on 40 acres of property owned by Robert Kamen, organically. After a third of Kamen's vines died because of fire-damaged irrigation equipment, Coturri replanted the vineyard with more Cabernet Sauvignon, in addition to Cabernet Franc, Merlot, Petit Verdot and Syrah. In 2013, Coturri oversaw the replanting for the Mayacamas Vineyards. That same year, the Moon Mountain District AVA was certified as an American Viticultural Area. Coturri has been recognized for helping with the certification. Of the 1,500 acres of vineyards in the AVA, Coturri manages 400 acres. He planted the initial vineyards for John Lasseter's winery, Lasseter Family Winery. As of 2016, Coturri manages 800 acres of vineyards. Clients include Bartholomew Park Winery, Landmark Vineyards, Laurel Glen Vineyard, Bedrock Wine Co., Amapola Creek, Harlan Estate, and Moon Mountain Vineyard.

=== Wine production ===
==== Winery Sixteen 600 ====
Coturri co-operates Winery Sixteen 600 with his sons, Sam and Max. Winery Sixteen 600 produces "terroir-driven single-vineyard wines." The winery produces wines from Coturri's home vineyard and additional vineyards that Coturri manages. In 2012, the winery produced 700 cases. Varietals include Syrah, Cabernet Sauvignon, Sauvignon Blanc, Viognier, Grenache, and estate grown Zinfandel. They have a tasting room in downtown Sonoma. The winery has limited distribution, with wines being available at local restaurants in Sonoma, California and the Lake Tahoe area. The wine label used on the bottles was designed by Stanley Mouse.

==== Coturri Winery ====
In 1979, Coturri co-founded Coturri Winery with brother, Tony and their father, Harry. Today, Tony is the winemaker. They produce small lot natural wines using estate grapes on Sonoma Mountain. They produce primarily red wines.

=== Olive oil ===
Coturri also co-produces an olive oil which is made with fruit from organic Italian olive trees planted on Coturri's home property. Coturri, alongside Lorenzo Petroni and Robert Cannard, imported thousands of trees. They were some of the first people in California to import and plant olive trees from Italy. Coturri and his wife, Arden Kremer, produce the olive oil, producing approximately 30 to 60 gallons annually.

== Recognition ==
Coturri was named an honorary chair for Sonoma Wine Country Weekend in 2013. In 2016, Coturri was recognized for his water conservation practices by the Golden Gate Salmon Association.

== Personal life ==
Coturri resides in Sonoma, California. He is married to olive oil specialist and producer Arden Kremer. The couple have two sons, Sam and Max.
