= Lake Wisconsin AVA =

American Viticultural Area in south central Wisconsin

Coordinates: 43°18′04″N 89°42′21″W

Lake Wisconsin
- Wine region
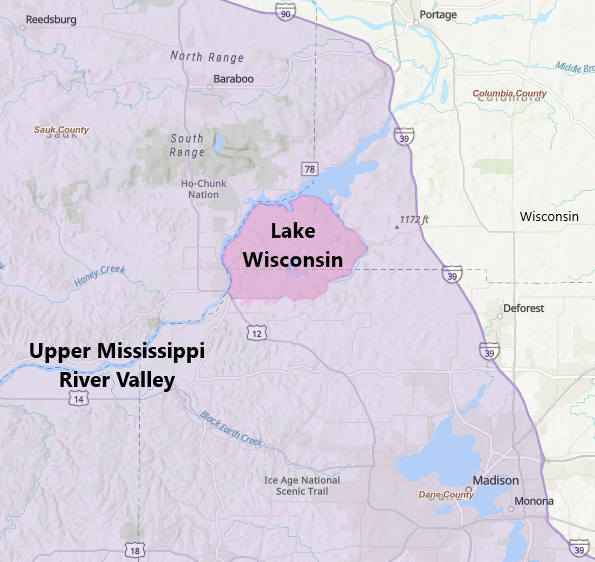
- Type: American Viticultural Area
- Year established: 1994
- Country: United States
- Part of: Wisconsin, Upper Mississippi River Valley AVA
- Growing season: 140–160 days
- Climate region: Continental (Dbf and Daf)
- Precipitation (annual average): 29 in (740 mm)
- Soil conditions: Mixed mineral material, silty or loamy texture underlain by gravelly or sandy loam glacial till or by dolomitic bedrock
- Total area: 28,000 acres (44 sq mi)
- Size of planted vineyards: 23+ acres (9.3+ ha)
- No. of vineyards: 1
- Grapes produced: La Crosse, Léon Millot, Marechal Foch, St. Pepin, Seyval Blanc
- No. of wineries: 1

Lake Wisconsin is the first American Viticultural Area (AVA) designated in the State of Wisconsin located in its south-central region within Columbia and Dane Counties. The appellation was established as the nation's 123^{rd} and the state's initial AVA on January 5, 1994 by the Bureau of Alcohol, Tobacco and Firearms (ATF), Treasury after reviewing the petition submitted by Charles W. Dean, Viticultural Area Consultant, on behalf of Robert P. Wollersheim and JoAnn I. Wollersheim, proprietors and landowners of Wollersheim Winery near Prairie du Sac, proposing a viticultural area known as "Lake Wisconsin."

The Wisconsin River and Lake Wisconsin outline the wine appellation's western and northern borders. The first grapes were planted in the area by Agoston Haraszthy in 1847, before he migrated to California. Most vineyards in the area are planted at elevations between 800 and 900 feet (240–270 m) above sea level. The area soils are gravel and sandy loam from glacial deposits. French hybrid grapes have had the most success in the Lake Wisconsin viticultural area, and the most important grape varietal grown in the area is Marechal Foch.

In 2009, Lake Wisconsin became a sub-appellation within the vast 19 million acres (29,914 sq mi) Upper Mississippi River Valley viticultural area which currently is the largest AVA in the nation. Wollersheim Winery is the sole winery with vintages whose labels bear the Lake Wisconsin appellation name.

== History ==
The place-name "Lake Wisconsin" was first used in 1917 to describe a widened section of the Wisconsin River that was submerged when the Baraboo hydroelectric dam was constructed one mile (1.6 km) upriver from the town of Prairie du Sac. The petitioner submitted a travel brochure and map produced by the Lake Wisconsin Chamber of Commerce in 1989, entitled Lake Wisconsin Chamber Recreation Area Vacationland showing various recreational and tourist facilities in the Lake Wisconsin viticultural area. The viticultural area has a long history of wine grape growing and wine making activity. Agoston Haraszthy, a Hungarian immigrant, well known as an early pioneer in the American wine industry, first planted European wine grapes on the Wollersheim Winery property in 1847. Cold winter temperatures frustrated this initial attempt to establish grapevines and two years later Haraszthy moved to California. The petitioner submitted other information to show that wine grape growing and wine making continued until 1900. Because of its role in the early history of Wisconsin, Wollersheim Winery and the adjacent homestead were listed on the National Register of Historic Places in 1976.

== Terroir ==
The Wisconsin River, that outlines the viticultural area's northern and western border, is a major natural feature of the State and of the region. It is the largest river in the State after the Mississippi River, of which it is a major tributary. Roads and highways define the southern boundary of the Lake Wisconsin viticultural area. The landscape of the viticultural area consists of discontinuous end moraines interspersed with ground moraines and occasional outwash plains. The landscape outside the southern boundary is of higher elevation and consists of rolling, hummocky upland with some outwash material. The eastern boundary, which closely approximates Spring Creek, identifies an area of low relief, continuous and intermittent stream drainage, and marsh. To the east of Spring Creek and outside the area is a glaciated upland plain where the landscape is generally of higher elevations and consists of end moraines with little or no outwash material.

=== Topography ===
The petitioner states that the vineyards are located at an elevation of 800 to 900 feet (240–270 m) along south and southwest facing slopes of 10–40 percent gradient. According to the petitioner, this combination of elevation, aspect, and relief contributes to the well-drained quality of the vineyard soils, the free circulation of air in summer and winter, and the locally longer growing season. Outside the area to the north and west, higher elevations of 900 to 1,200 feet (270–370 m) increase the risk of wind damage to grapevines, or the soils become too shallow for successful grape cultivation where bedrock is nearer the surface or exposed. The petitioner states that, outside the area to the east, elevations between 720 feet (220 m), the Wisconsin River level, and 800 feet (240 m) are generally less well drained or are saturated during periods of rainfall or snow melt.

=== Climate ===
The petitioner states that the Lake Wisconsin viticultural area benefits from the micro-climate effects of the lower Wisconsin River valley. The river moderates winter temperatures in the area several degrees higher than areas north and west of the river or further south. Air circulation within the river valley helps prevent cold air accumulation and frost pockets from forming in the vineyards. In summer, the river valley and limestone bluffs along the river's edge serve to channel air currents and increase localized air circulation, protecting the vineyards from mildew and rot in hot, humid weather. The petitioner states that the viticultural area has a mean precipitation of 29 inches (737 mm), one inch (25 mm) less than the average rainfall in the area north and east, three inches (76 mm) less than the average rainfall in the area to the west, and two inches (51 mm) less than the state average. The petitioner describes the viticultural area as an "island" of locally below-average rainfall and drier soils conducive to the grapevines concentrating their vigor in ripening fruit. According to the petitioner, the viticultural area has a growing season of 140–160 days, ten to twenty days longer than across the river to the west and to the north. The additional frost-free period allows the grapes to reach maturity before the onset of winter cold. The USDA plant hardiness zone is 5a to 5b.

=== Soil ===
The petitioner states that the Wisconsin River forms an approximate dividing line between the glaciated and unglaciated regions of south-central Wisconsin. Soils primarily of glacial till and outwash material are found east of the river valley and characterize the soils in the viticultural area. According to the petitioner, the unglaciated "driftless" soils west of the valley result from significant differences in soil parent materials, microrelief, and drainage. The soils that support viticulture within the area are Typic Hapludalfs of mixed mineral material and silty or loamy texture. All are underlain by gravelly or sandy loam glacial till or by dolomitic bedrock. The soils are typically well drained and about 36–60 inches (910–1,520 mm) deep on slopes and rolling areas of 2–45 percent gradient. The petitioner states that the soils outside the viticultural area to the north and west are predominately unglaciated, and so are not underlain by glacial till and contain less outwash material. The soils outside the area to the south and east, although glacially derived, are found on topography of rolling upland with fewer limestone outcrops and no outwash plains. The soils there have formed on slightly higher elevations over discontinuous end and ground moraines.
