= Arpad Haraszthy =

American winemaker (1840–1900)

- Haraszthy Árpád
- Born: June 28, 1840; Futtak, Hungary
- Died: November 15, 1900 (aged 60); San Francisco, California

Arpad Haraszthy (Hungarian: Haraszthy Árpád; June 28, 1840, Futtak, Hungary – November 15, 1900, San Francisco, California) was a pioneer California winemaker best known as the creator of Eclipse champagne, the first commercially successful sparkling wine produced in the state. He was the first president of the California State Board of Viticultural Commissioners, one of the founding members and first officers of San Francisco's world-famous Bohemian Club, and a frequent and articulate writer on wine, winemaking, and viticulture. He has been criticized by some modern wine historians for his claims that his father, Agoston Haraszthy (often called "The Father of California Viticulture"), imported the first Zinfandel grape vines to California in the early 1850s. Zinfandel later became famous as California's best grape for the production of red table wine. Arpad Haraszthy's claims about his father's importations of Zinfandel have neither been proved nor disproved, and they remain a subject of controversy (see discussion below).

== Birth ==
Arpad Haraszthy was born in 1840 in Futtak, Hungary, (now Futog, Serbia), the third son of the pioneer Hungarian-American winemaker Agoston Haraszthy and his wife, Eleonóra Dedinszky Haraszthy. He belonged to the Mokcsai branch of the Haraszthy family, a Hungarian noble family that traced its roots to Ung County in northeastern Hungary, now part of Hungary, Slovakia and Ukraine. The pronunciation of the family name in Hungarian is [ˈhɒrɒsti ˈaːɡoʃton]. In American English, it is pronounced / ˈhærəsti/. Haraszthy's maternal grandfather was Ferencz Dedinszky, the superintendent of the 34,000-acre Futtak estate on the banks of the Danube River about eight miles west of Újvidék (today Novi Sad, Serbia).

== To Wisconsin ==
With his father and other family members, Haraszthy came to Wisconsin in 1842, where his father had founded a village on the banks of the Wisconsin River about twenty-five miles northwest of Madison. First called Széptáj (Hungarian for "beautiful place"), later Haraszthy (or Haraszthyville or Haraszthopolis), the village was finally named Sauk City.

== To California ==
The Haraszthys remained in Wisconsin until 1849, when Agoston led them and a company of emigrants across the plains to California. With other members of his family, Haraszthy traveled in a covered wagon train via the Santa Fe Trail and arrived in San Diego, California, in December, 1849. Agoston Haraszthy settled the family on the San Diego Plaza and became prominent in the civic and commercial life of the town.

== To New York and New Jersey ==
After Agoston Haraszthy was elected to the California State Legislature in September, 1851, Arpad Haraszthy joined his mother, his younger brother Bela, and his sisters Ida and Otelia, on an ocean voyage to New York. They traveled by ship from San Diego to Panama, crossed the Isthmus to the Caribbean coast, then boarded another ship for New York City, where they arrived in 1852. Haraszthy attended school in New York while his mother established a home in nearby Plainfield, New Jersey. In New Jersey the family became good friends with an exiled Hungarian patriot named Lázár Mészáros, former secretary of war in the Hungarian government of Lajos Kossuth. An avid horticulturalist, Mészáros established a nursery at his farm in Scotch Plains, New Jersey, near the Haraszthy home. In New Jersey, Haraszthy became acquainted with the grape vines in Mészáros's nursery, cuttings of which Mészáros was then sending by ship to Agoston Haraszthy in California. Haraszthy later claimed that Mészáros helped his father obtain cuttings of Zinfandel.

== Return to California ==
After finishing his studies in New York, Haraszthy traveled through the United States, then returned to California by steamship. There he visited his father's vineyard properties at Crystal Springs, south of San Francisco, and in Sonoma, north of the city. Agoston Haraszthy was then in the process of transferring vines and vine cuttings from Crystal Springs to his new Sonoma property, which he called Buena Vista (now the Buena Vista Winery). After two months in California, Haraszthy returned to the East Coast, then set out across the Atlantic to France.

== French champagne studies ==
Reaching Paris in the latter part of 1857, Haraszthy enrolled in the École Polytechnique, France's most prestigious engineering school. Two years later, he went north to Épernay in Champagne, where he studied Champagne-making in the house of De Venoge. He was in Paris in late 1861, when his father, mother, and sister Ida arrived there to begin a vine-gathering tour of Europe. Haraszthy traveled with his father through France, Germany, Switzerland, Italy, and Spain, helping him gather vines which were sent back to San Francisco. After Agoston Haraszthy returned to San Francisco at the end of 1861, he had more than 100,000 vine cuttings representing more than 300 European grape varieties. In New York, Harper & Brothers (now Harper) published his book about his European tour, called Grape Culture, Vines, and Wine-Making. When Haraszthy's Champagne studies were complete, he returned to California in the fall of 1862.

== In Sonoma ==
Haraszthy began to make wine at his father's new Buena Vista property in Sonoma, California, in the fall of 1862. As cellarmaster of Buena Vista, he produced both still and sparkling wines. His first sparkling wines (then called champagne) were failures, but later efforts were successful. On June 1, 1863, Haraszthy married Jovita Vallejo, daughter of Mariano Guadalupe Vallejo, the founder of Sonoma, and his brother Attila Haraszthy married Natalia Vallejo, Jovita's sister.

This double-wedding united two of the leading winemaking families in Sonoma, for Vallejo was himself a prominent winemaker in the town. Agoston Haraszthy incorporated the Buena Vista property under the name of the Buena Vista Vinicultural Society in 1863. Toward the end of 1864, Haraszthy resigned from Buena Vista and formed a partnership with Pietro Giovanari, overseer of Vallejo's vineyards. The two men produced wine on their own account and for other vineyard owners under the name of Haraszthy and Giovanari.

== In San Francisco ==
In 1866, Haraszthy moved to San Francisco, where he joined Isidor Landsberger, one of the trustees of the Buena Vista Vinicultural Society, in forming a new firm called I. Landsberger. Soon Haraszthy became a partner in the company, which was renamed I. Landsberger & Co. Under his direction, the partnership made and sold still and sparkling wines from cellars located in San Francisco. Following the traditional French champagne methods he had learned in Épernay, France, Haraszthy produced bottle-fermented sparkling wines. Beginning in 1867, the wine was sold under the name of Sparkling California. In 1875, Landsberger & Co. introduced the sparkling wine called Eclipse Extra Dry. This was a superior, semi-dry, bottle-fermented sparkling wine made in accordance with the French champagne method. Eclipse was exhibited at the Centennial Exhibition in Philadelphia in 1876. In the following years, its reputation spread to the East Coast and eventually to Mexico, England, Japan, and the South Pacific. The wine won medals at expositions in California, New York, England, France, and other countries. Cases were purchased by Andrew Carnegie, Henry Clay Frick, and Robert Louis Stevenson.

In 1880, Landsberger withdrew from his partnership with Haraszthy and was succeeded by Henry Epstein. Epstein and Haraszthy operated the business under the name of Arpad Haraszthy & Co. until 1894, when the newly formed California Wine Association took over some of its operations. After first agreeing and later declining to join the California Wine Association, Haraszthy continued the production of his sparkling wine under his own name until about 1899.

== Bohemian Club ==
Haraszthy was one of the founding members of San Francisco's world-famous Bohemian Club. In 1872, he was elected as the first treasurer of the club. He was subsequently elected as its vice president. His membership in the club continued until his death.

== Orleans Vineyard ==
When Henry Epstein became a partner in Arpad Haraszthy & Co., he contributed the Orleans Vineyard (originally called the Orleans Hill Vineyard) to the firm. Embracing more than 800 acres of foothill land in Yolo County at the eastern edge of the Sacramento Valley, the Orleans Vineyard was planted to Johannisberg Riesling, Zinfandel, Feher Szagos, Early Madeleine, Folle Blanche, Burger, West's White Prolific (also known as French Colombard), and Black Burgundy grapes. Until 1885, grapes from the Orleans Vineyard were transported to the cellars of Arpad Haraszthy and Co. in San Francisco for crushing, fermentation, blending, aging, and bottling. After 1885, the grapes were crushed and fermented in a winery erected on the Orleans Vineyard property. Grapes from the Orleans Vineyard were used to produce both still and sparkling wines. In 1895, Epstein transferred the Orleans Vineyard to the California Wine Association. The vine louse called phylloxera had by that time infested the property, and by 1902 the vineyard was completely destroyed by the pest.

== Board of State Viticultural Commissioners ==
In 1880, the California Legislature created the California Board of State Viticultural Commissioners "to adopt such measures as may best promote the progress of the viticultural industries of the State." With nine commissioners appointed by the governor, the Board was the first state agency created to promote California's viticultural efforts. Haraszthy was elected as president of the Board. While he was president, the Board established an office in San Francisco, created a wine library (later transferred to the University of California), adopted measures to control the phylloxera, held conventions of vineyardists and winemakers in different parts of the state, recommended legislation for the adoption of the California Legislature and Congress (including pure wine laws), and worked with Eugene W. Hilgard, the first professor of agriculture at the University of California, Berkeley, to promote good viticultural practices. Haraszthy continued to serve as president of the state board until 1888.

== Zinfandel ==
Haraszthy planted Zinfandel grape vines in his vineyards and frequently used Zinfandel grapes in the production of his wines, both still and sparkling. He claimed that his father, Agoston Haraszthy, imported the Zinfandel vine to California. His most explicit claims about the Zinfandel were made in the 1870s and 1880s, when he asserted that Agoston Haraszthy brought the first Zinfandels to California in the early 1850s, possibly as early as 1852, and that he did so with the help of his Hungarian friend, Lázár Mészáros. A century later, California wine historian Charles L. Sullivan began to challenge Haraszthy's statement. In two books, Strong Wine: The Life and Legend of Agoston Haraszthy and A Toast to Eclipse: Arpad Haraszthy and the Sparkling Wine of Old San Francisco, McGinty has presented evidence that Agoston may well have obtained Zinfandel vines as early as 1852 with the help of Mészáros. The issue remains a subject of controversy.

== As wine writer ==
Haraszthy was a frequent writer about wine, winemaking, and vineyard practices. His first articles were a series of letters written from France and published in the San Francisco-based California Farmer in 1861 and 1862. He continued with another series of articles published in the California Wine, Wool, and Stock Journal in 1863 and 1864. In 1864, his article titled "Wine-Making in California" was published in the New York-based Harper's New Monthly Magazine. The San Francisco-based Overland Monthly published four of his articles under the same title of "Wine-Making in California" in 1871 and 1872. In 1888, he contributed an essay on "Early Viticulture in Sonoma" to a book titled Sonoma County and Russian River Valley Illustrated. The essay was reprinted in the San Francisco Merchant in the same year. While he served as president of the State Board of Viticultural Commissioners, Haraszthy made written reports to the California governor and gave speeches that were published in the State Board's official reports. His long speech-essay titled "How to Drink Wine" was published by the State Board in 1888 and reprinted the following year in Frona Eunice Waite's Wines and Vines of California: A Treatise on the Ethics of Wine Drinking. In 1978, the Book Club of California reissued Haraszthy's Overland Monthly essays of 1871 and 1872 as a separate volume under the title Wine-Making in California. The bibliography of McGinty's A Toast to Eclipse lists 40 publications by Arpad Haraszthy.

== Last years ==
Haraszthy continued to produce sparkling wine in San Francisco until about 1899. In early 1900, he went to Nome, Alaska, with his brother Bela Haraszthy, seeking to strike gold in the northern territory. He returned to San Francisco in November of the year in ill health. After visiting some friends on November 15, he collapsed on the street in a rainstorm and was taken to the San Francisco Receiving Hospital, where he was pronounced dead. He was 60 years old.

== Eclipse Champagne Building ==
Isidore Landsberger's original wine depot was located in the 400 block of Jackson Street. When Haraszthy became an associate of I. Landsberger and Co., the company moved to a location on the corner Jones Alley (present day Hotaling Alley) and Washington Street. When Isidore Landsberger sold his interest in the company, Haraszthy moved his storefront to the same corner, but on the Washington Street side. The present building there, the Eclipse Champagne Building, is a 1940's building and not the same building as Haraszthy's original cellars.

== Family ==
Haraszthy's marriage to Jovita Vallejo continued until her death on May 5, 1878. He did not remarry. They were the parents of two children: a daughter, Agostine (April 11, 1864 – June 13, 1913), and a son, Carlos (June 2, 1867 – September 19, 1903). Neither left any descendants.
