= Hacienda Wine Cellars =

Coordinates: 38.27093°N 122.43639°W

- Location: Sonoma, California, United States
- Founded: 1973
- Key people: Frank Bartholomew

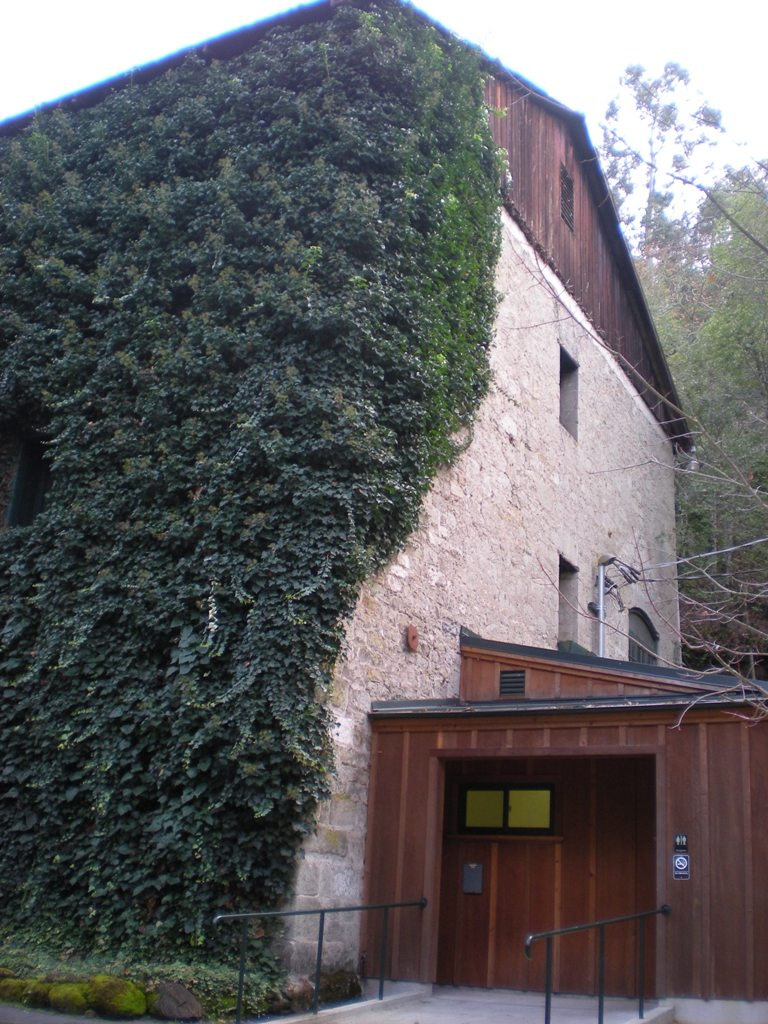
Bartholomew Park Winery, the former home of Hacienda Wine Cellars

Hacienda Wine Cellars is a former winery once owned by Frank Bartholomew, that was located in Sonoma, California, United States. Hacienda was founded in 1973 after Bartholomew sold his ownership of Buena Vista Winery in 1968. After the sale, he retained the majority of his original vineyard land, and proceeded to acquire a former hospital located near the vineyard land and developed it into a winery. By 1977, it was operated by A. Crawford Cooley, producing 25,000 cases a year. JFJ Bronco purchased Hacienda by 1992, as well as Hacienda's sister label, Antares.

Frank Bartholomew died in 1985. After his death, his wife, Antonia Bartholomew, built a replica of Agoston Haraszthy's former villa on the property. The building that once housed Hacienda became Bartholomew Park Winery in 1994.
