= Wisconsin wine =

American Viticultural Areas in Wisconsin

Wisconsin
- Wine region
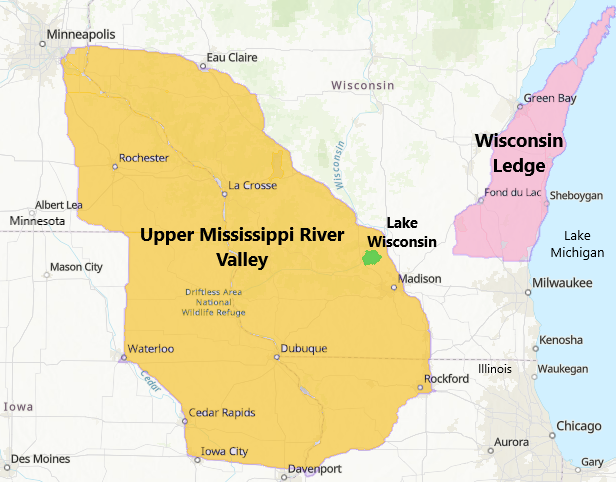
- Official name: State of Wisconsin
- Type: U.S. State Appellation
- Year established: 1848
- Country: United States
- Other regions in vicinity: Michigan, Minnesota
- Sub-regions: Lake Wisconsin AVA, Wisconsin Ledge AVA, Upper Mississippi River Valley AVA
- Climate region: Continental
- Total area: 34.7 million acres (54,158 sq mi)
- Grapes produced: Baco noir, Chardonnay, Concord, Frontenac, Leon Millot, Marechal Foch, Seyval blanc, St. Croix
- No. of wineries: 60

Wisconsin wine refers to wine made from grapes grown in the U.S. state appellation of Wisconsin. State names in the United States automatically qualify as legal appellations of origin for wine produced from grapes grown in that state and do not require registration with the Alcohol and Tobacco Tax and Trade Bureau (TTB) of the Treasury Department. TTB was created in January 2003, when the Bureau of Alcohol, Tobacco and Firearms, or ATF, was extensively reorganized under the provisions of the Homeland Security Act of 2002.

Wisconsin shares acreage of the nation's largest American Viticultural Area (AVA), the Upper Mississippi Valley AVA, that encompasses southwest Wisconsin, southeast Minnesota, northeast Iowa, and northwest Illinois. The state also entirely contains two established viticultural areas, the Lake Wisconsin AVA and the Wisconsin Ledge AVA.
The Wisconsin Winery Association is a statewide organization that promotes wine making in the state.

== History ==
The first wine grapes were planted in Wisconsin by Agoston Haraszthy in the mid-19th century. Before he migrated to California and helped to found the wine industry there, he established a vineyard, winery and wine cellars overlooking the Wisconsin River at what is today the Wollersheim Winery near Prairie du Sac. Although Haraszthy found the climate of Wisconsin difficult for wine grape production, later German settlers produced wine using both European and native American grape varieties.

The first modern winery in Wisconsin, the von Stiehl Winery in Algoma, opened in 1967. Today over 110 wineries have commercial operations in Wisconsin, with most making wines from other fruits in addition to grapes. Some Wisconsin wineries rely upon vineyards in other states for all or part of their grape sources.

The first annual professional wine competition in Wisconsin was held at the Wisconsin State Fair in 2011.

== See also ==
- American wine
- Lake Wisconsin AVA
- Upper Mississippi Valley AVA
- Wisconsin Ledge AVA
