= Board of State Viticultural Commissioners =

Board of State Viticultural Commissioners was established in 1880 in the U.S. state of California. The board's office was located 526 Montgomery Street, San Francisco.

== Responsibilities ==
It was the responsibility of the Board to meet semi-annually to consult and to adopt such measures as may best promote the progress of the viticultural industries of the State. It was their duty to select and appoint competent and qualified persons to deliver at least one lecture each year in each of the viticultural districts, for the purpose of illustrating practical viticultural topics, and imparting instruction in methods of culture, pruning, fertilizing, fermenting, distilling, and rectifying, treating diseases of the vine, raisin drying, and others, and to disseminate useful knowledge relating to viticulture by printed documents or correspondence. The Board devoted especial attention to the study of the phylloxera and other diseases of the vine, and made recommendations in their semi-annual reports regarding the protection of vineyards.

== Representation ==
The nine members included two members-at-large and seven others representing the seven viticultural districts:

1. Sonoma District (Counties of Sonoma, Marin, Lake, Mendocino, Humboldt, Del Norte, Trinity, and Siskiyou)
2. Napa District (Counties of Napa, Solano, and Contra Costa)
3. San Francisco District (City and County of San Francisco, and the Counties of San Mateo, Alameda, Santa Clara, Santa Cruz, San Benito and Monterey)
4. Los Angeles District (Counties of Los Angeles, Ventura, Santa Barbara, San Luis Obispo, San Bernardino and San Diego)
5. Sacramento District (Counties of Sacramento, Yolo, Sutter, Colusa, Butte, Tehama, and Shasta)
6. San Joaquin District (Counties of San Joaquin, Stanislaus, Merced, Fresno, Tulare, and Kern)
7. El Dorado District (Counties of El Dorado, Amador, Calaveras, Tuolumne, Mariposa, Placer, Nevada, Yuba, Sierra, Plumas, Lassen, Modoc, Alpine, Mono, and Inyo)

== Commissioners ==
The first appointed commissioners were:

- Arpad Haraszthy, President, Commissioner for the San Francisco District
- Charles A. Wetmore, Vice-President, Commissioner for the State at Large
- Charles Krug, Treasurer, Commissioner for the Napa District
- I. Deturk, Commissioner for the Sonoma District
- R. B. Blowers, Commissioner for the Sacramento District
- George West, Commissioner for the San Joaquin District
- L. J. Rose, Commissioner for the Los Angeles District
- G. G. Blanchard, Commissioner for the El Dorado District
- J. Debarth Shorb, Commissioner for the State at Large
