= Wollersheim Winery =

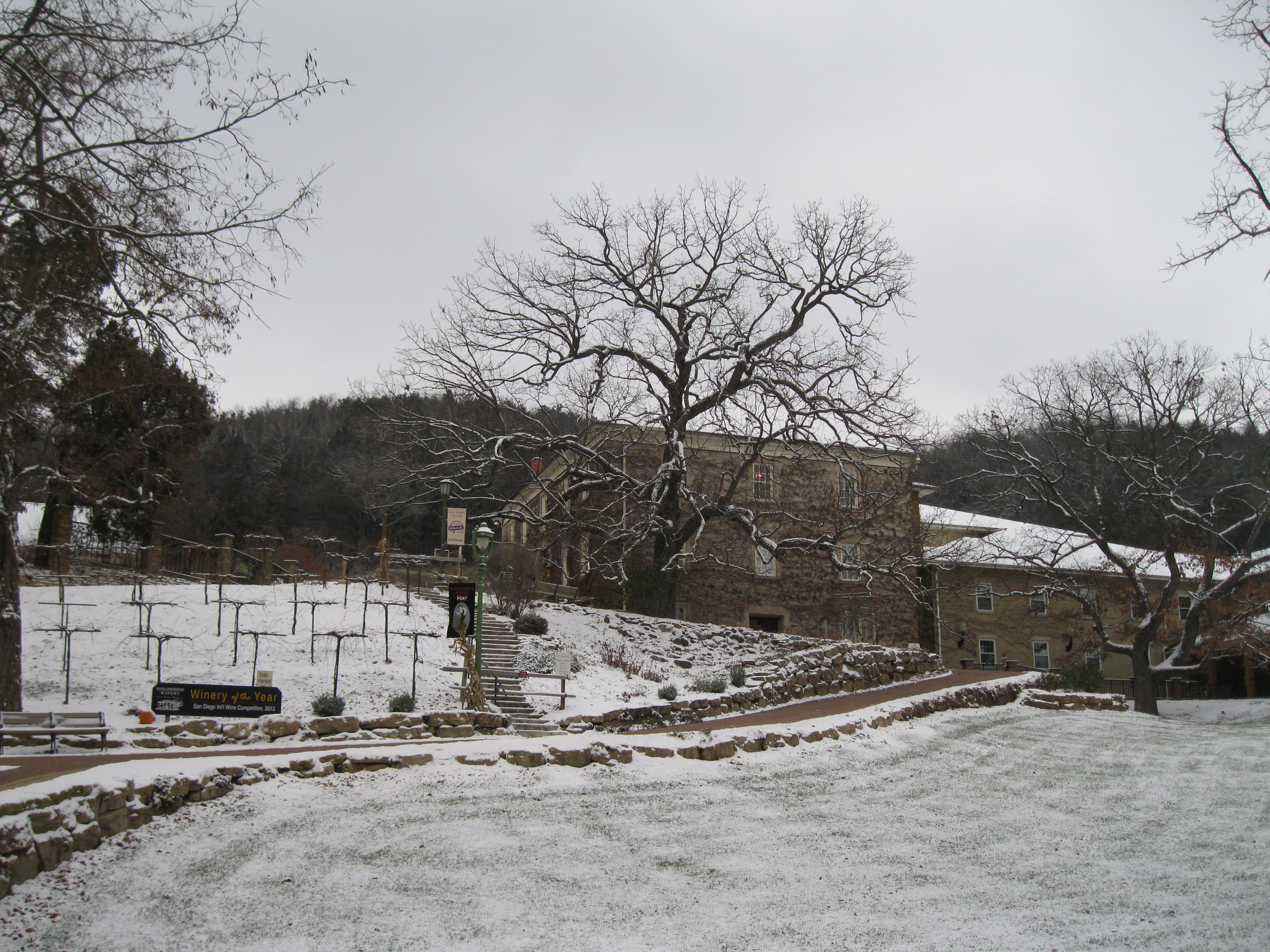
- Wollersheim Winery in 2014
- Location: Prairie du Sac, Wisconsin, United States
- Formerly: Kehl Winery
- Founded: 1847
- Key people: Agoston Haraszthy, founder Robert Wollersheim; Philippe Coquard, winemaker
- Cases/yr: 100000 (as of 2016)
- Known for: Prairie Fume
- Distribution: limited
- Tasting: Open to public
- Website: www.wollersheim.com

- Wollersheim Winery
- U.S. National Register of Historic Places
- Location within Wisconsin
- Coordinates: 43.288125°N 89.707283°W
- NRHP reference No.: 76000056
- Added to NRHP: 1/12/1976

The Wollersheim Winery (formerly Kehl Winery) is a winery, distillery, and restaurant just east of the twin cities of Sauk City and Prairie du Sac, Wisconsin in Dane County, Wisconsin, United States.

In the 1840s, the Hungarian nobleman Agoston Haraszthy came across sloped land across the Wisconsin River from what would be Prairie du Sac and planted it with grapevines for wine making. During his short time in Wisconsin, Haraszthy also incorporated the state's first village, Sauk City, across the Wisconsin River from his winery. The area's winters were too harsh for the grape plants that he brought. In December 1849, he followed the gold rush to California, where he would also have a hand in developing the state's wine industry.

Peter Kehl, a German immigrant, took over the property after Haraszthy left, Kehl built many structures on the property, and planted American grapes to make wine. After Peter Kehl's death, his son Jacob continued the family winery and started making brandy. In 1899, after Jacob Kehl's death and a difficult winter, the Kehl family stopped making wine and converted the property into a conventional farm. When Prohibition passed in 1919, any remaining wine was sold, and leftover barrels were used as firewood.

In 1972, Robert and JoAnn Wollersheim bought the farm from Peter Kehl's great-grandson, Russell Kehl, to restore it to a working winery. They planted the hills with grapevines, furnished the limestone cellars with oak barrels and converted the old carriage house into a store. Soon after in 1976 the property was added to the National Register of Historic Places. In 1984, Philippe Coquard arrived at the winery from the Beaujolais region of France on an agricultural exchange to become Wollersheim Winery's winemaker. He later married Wollersheim's daughter Julie and they eventually started running the winery.

Wollersheim Winery grew rapidly and garnered national media attention with the introduction of its Prairie Fumé wine in 1989. In 1990, Wollersheim Winery bought Cedar Creek Winery, located in the Hilgen and Wittenberg Woolen Mill in Cedarburg, Wisconsin. The sister wineries share family ownership and a winemaker, but the two brands are distinct.

As Wollersheim Winery's wine list grew, so did the Prairie du Sac winery. In 1994, a fermentation room was built, allowing the fermentation tanks to move out of an old barn, and also adding a bottling room and case storage space. In 2008, the Coquards added a new building that mimicked the historic winery allowing more visitor space, as well as tasting and shopping areas, with beautiful views of the hillside vineyards. In 2013, they renovated the historic hillside wine cave – originally started by Harazsthy and completed by the Kehls – into an exhibit dedicated to the winery's history. In 2015, the Coquards added a distillery to the property which allowed not only dedicated space to distill spirits, but also more fermentation space to make wine to be distilled into brandy.

As of 2016, the winery produced about 1.1 million bottles of wine per year. Wollersheim brings in about 85 percent of its fruit from out of state and grows the rest on its 30-acre (12 ha) vineyard.

== Awards ==
In 2012, Wollersheim won the Winery of the year in the San Diego International Wine Competition over 1700 wineries. In 2013, Wollersheim's Dry Riesling was awarded the Wine of the Year. Riverside International Wine Competition named Wollersheim Winery its Small Winery of the Year in 2015.
