= Spring Creek (Waupaca River tributary) =

Stream in Wisconsin, U.S.

Coordinates: 44°23′47″N 89°16′33″W

Spring Creek is a stream in the U.S. state of Wisconsin. It is a tributary to the Waupaca River.

The stream's name appears on older maps as "Spring Lake Creek".
