= Buena Vista Winery =

Winery in California

- U.S. National Register of Historic Places
- California Historical Landmark
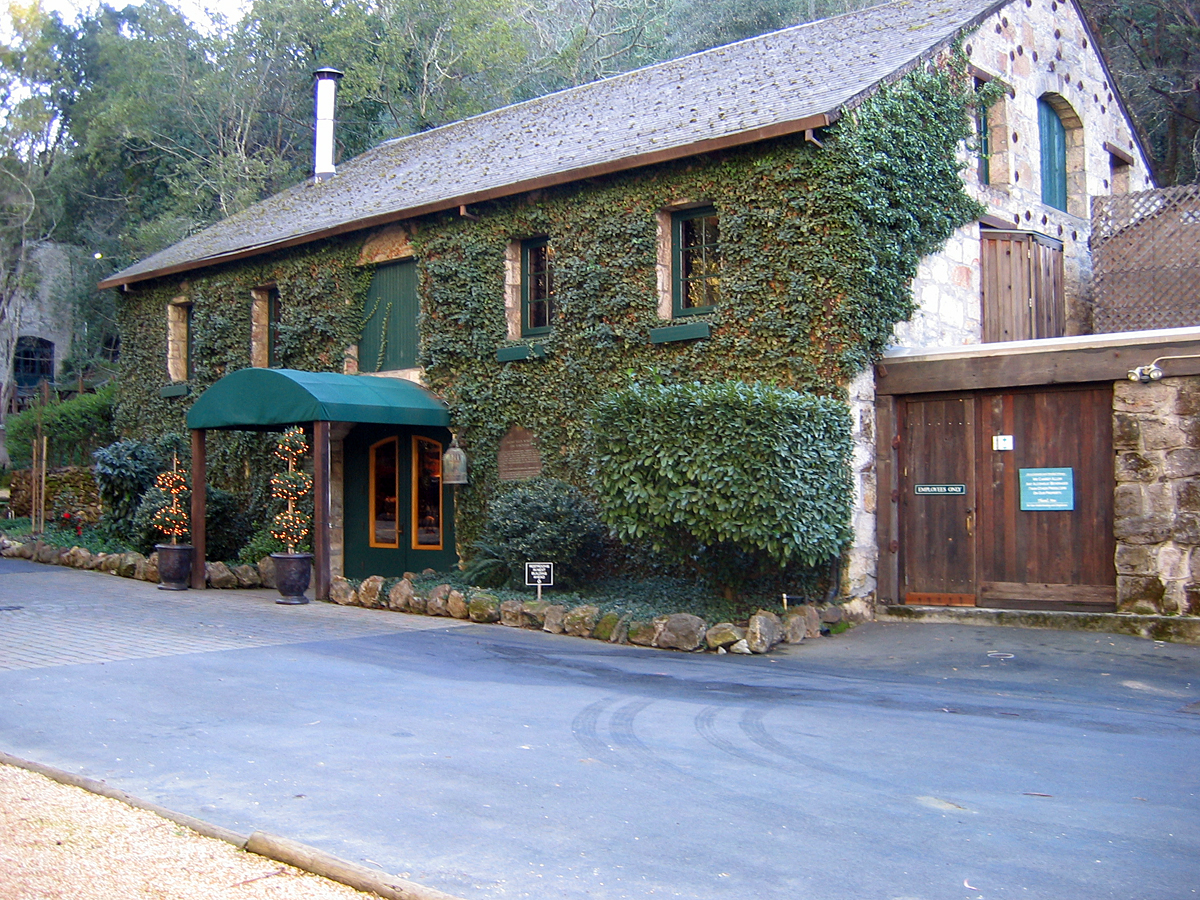

- Location within California Location within the United States
- Location: 18000 Old Winery Rd., Sonoma, California
- Coordinates: 38°17′58″N 122°25′23″W
- Built: 1857
- Architect: Agoston Haraszthy
- NRHP reference No.: 86001902
- CHISL No.: 392
- Added to NRHP: July 24, 1986

Buena Vista Winery is a winery located in Sonoma, California, United States. It is the second oldest winery in California after the D'Agostini Winery, which was founded a year prior in 1856. It was founded by Agoston Haraszthy in 1857. The winery is located on its original grounds, just east of Sonoma, California.

== History ==
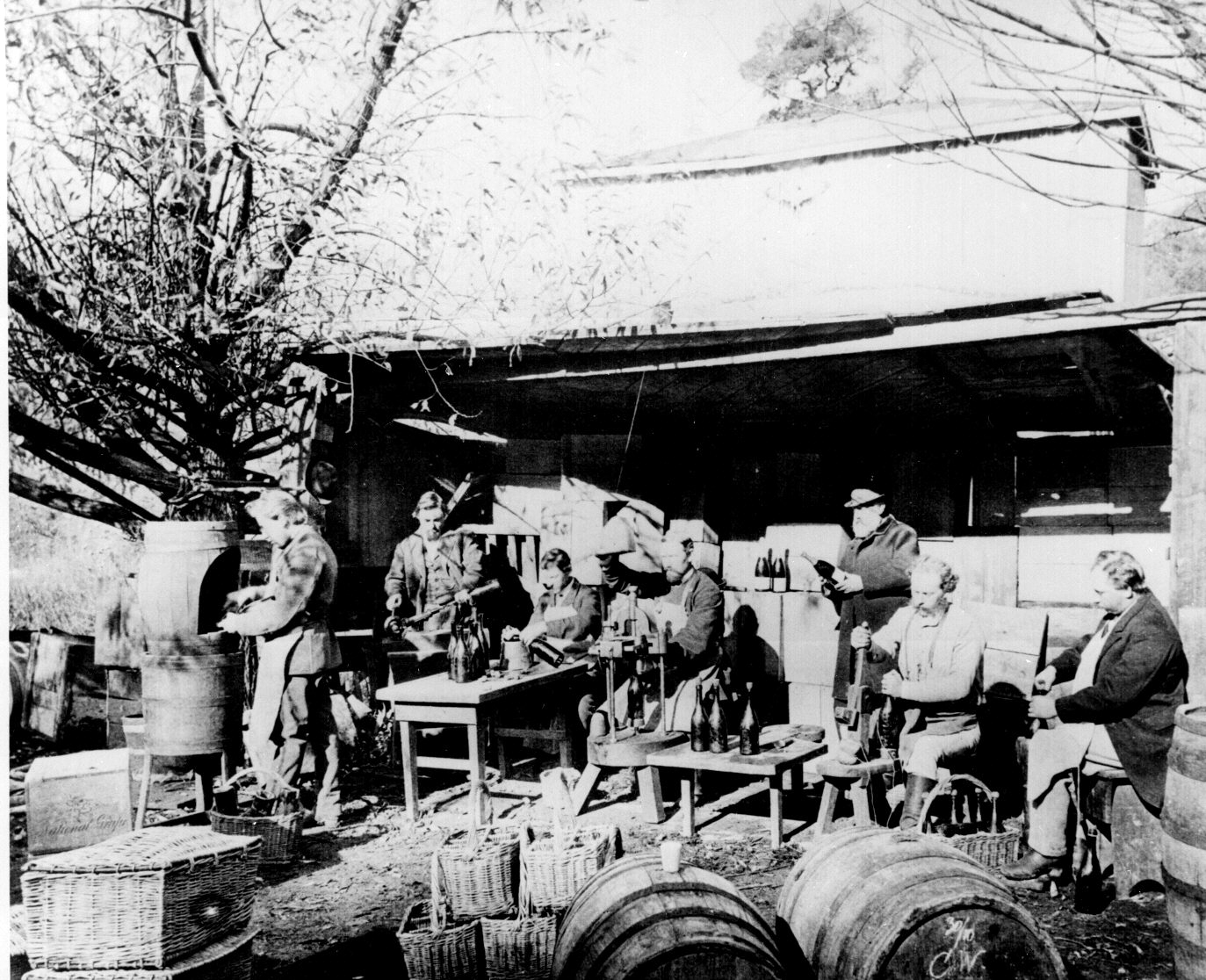
Sparkling wine being bottled during the early 1870s at Buena Vista, as photographed by Eadweard Muybridge

Buena Vista Winery was founded in 1857 by Agoston Haraszthy a Hungarian from Budapest. Haraszthy was unable to sustain the estate financially, and in 1863 financial support came by way of the Buena Vista Vinicultural Society; a group of financiers led by San Francisco banker William Ralston. Within two years of the society's founding, Buena Vista was producing two million gallons of wine a year. The success of the budding wine industry in California led to wine prices dropping dramatically as expenses rose. In 1866 Haraszthy was forced to resign from his position of superintendent of the winery. During the 1870s the winery would produce about 100,000 gallons of wine a year from approximately 500 acres of vineyards. Sparkling wine was a popular seller. During the depression of 1873-77 the society was forced to liquidate its assets and file for bankruptcy. The estate, in the 1880s, would become the home of businessman Robert C. Johnson.

Phylloxera would destroy the vineyards just before World War I and Prohibition would postpone any hopes of reopening the winery. In 1941, 435-acres of Buena Vista land was acquired by United Press news executive Frank Bartholomew at auction. He replanted some of the original vineyards and in 1943 he bonded the winery and became one of the first entrepreneurs to invest in the California wine industry after Prohibition. He would sell the property in 1968 to Vernon Underwood of Young's Market. Bartholomew would retain most of the original vineyards, which would form the basis for Hacienda Wine Cellars.

Underwood planted a large vineyard in the Carneros region and built a new modern winery facility. The West German wine and spirits company A. Racke purchased Buena Vista in 1979. In 1984 they acquired 1,000 acres, making Buena Vista the largest vineyard estate in the area. Today, the winery sits on its original property, and is owned by the Boisset Collection, led by Jean-Charles Boisset, who purchased the winery and the historic property in May 2011. The original hand-dug caves are still on site, and have been re-opened to visitors for tours after a reconstruction effort led by Boisset. The visitor center, located inside the original wine press house, provides access to the original champagne cellar.

Buena Vista is listed on the National Register of Historic Places and is a California Historical Landmark. It is additionally a Sonoma County Historic Landmark and is included on the Sonoma County Historical Society list of landmarks.

== Wine ==
The winery produces 100,000 cases of wine from such grape varieties as cabernet sauvignon, syrah, pinot noir, merlot, sauvignon blanc, zinfandel and chardonnay, as well as a host of wines from unique historical varietals under the "Vinicultural Society" label. The winemaker is Brian Maloney, with Consulting Winemaker David Ramey.

== Haraszthy Villa ==
Buena Vista Winery
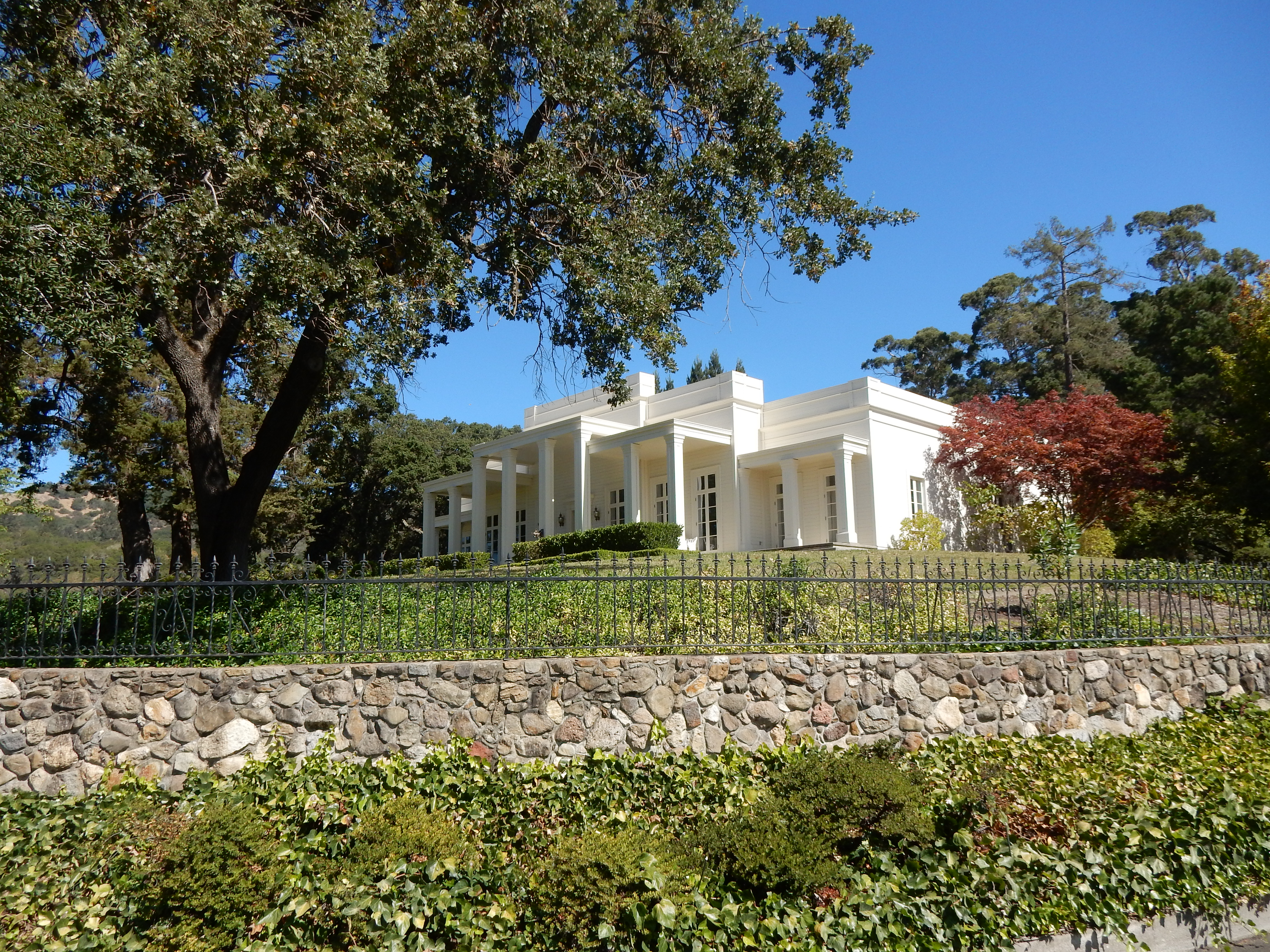
- Haraszthy Villa in 2016
- Interactive map of Buena Vista Winery
- Location: Sonoma, Sonoma County

California Historical Landmark
- Official name: Site of Haraszthy Villa
- Reference no.: 392-1

A reconstruction of Haraszthy Villa (also called the Palladian Villa) is located on Castle Road near Buena Vista Winery. The building, a part of the Buena Vista Winery California Historical Landmark title as #892-1, is a reconstruction of the original villa built by Haraszthy in 1857. It looks over the original Haraszthy planted vineyards. The property was the site of the first masquerade ball to celebrate the wine harvest in California. It was held October 23, 1864. Mariano Guadalupe Vallejo and Francisca Benicia Carrillo were the guests of honor at the ball. The reconstructed villa was commissioned by Antonia Bartholomew in 1988. It was completed in 1990. The architecture was based on photographs of the original building. As of its completion, it was owned and maintained by the Frank H. Bartholomew Trust. It was also maintained by Gundlach Bundschu for a period of time. A museum was also located on site which examined the life of Bartholomew.

== Gallery ==
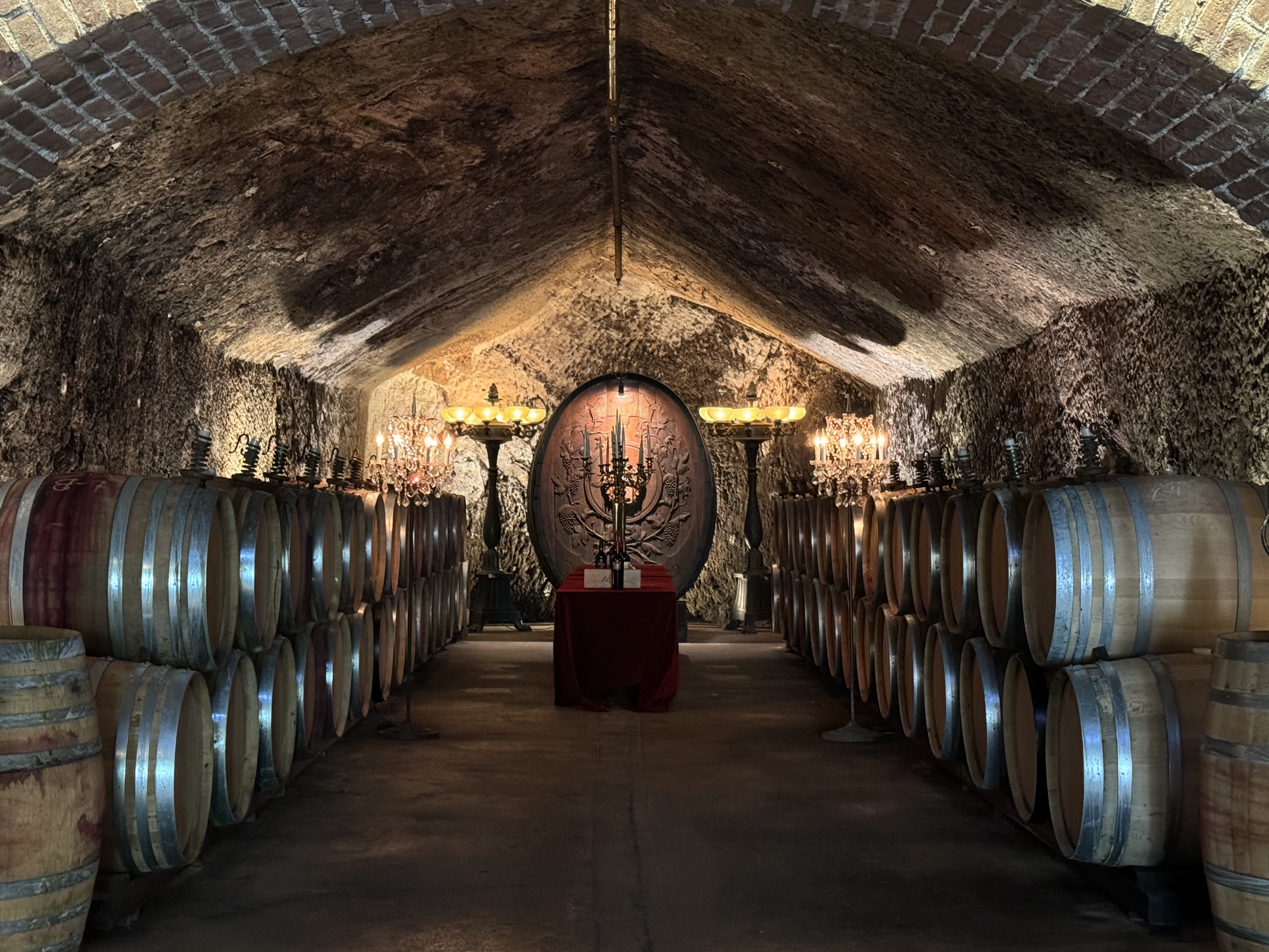
A historic wine cave at Buena Vista Winery in September 2024.

== See also ==
- Sonoma County wine
