= Agoston Haraszthy =

Hungarian-American winemaker (1812–1869)

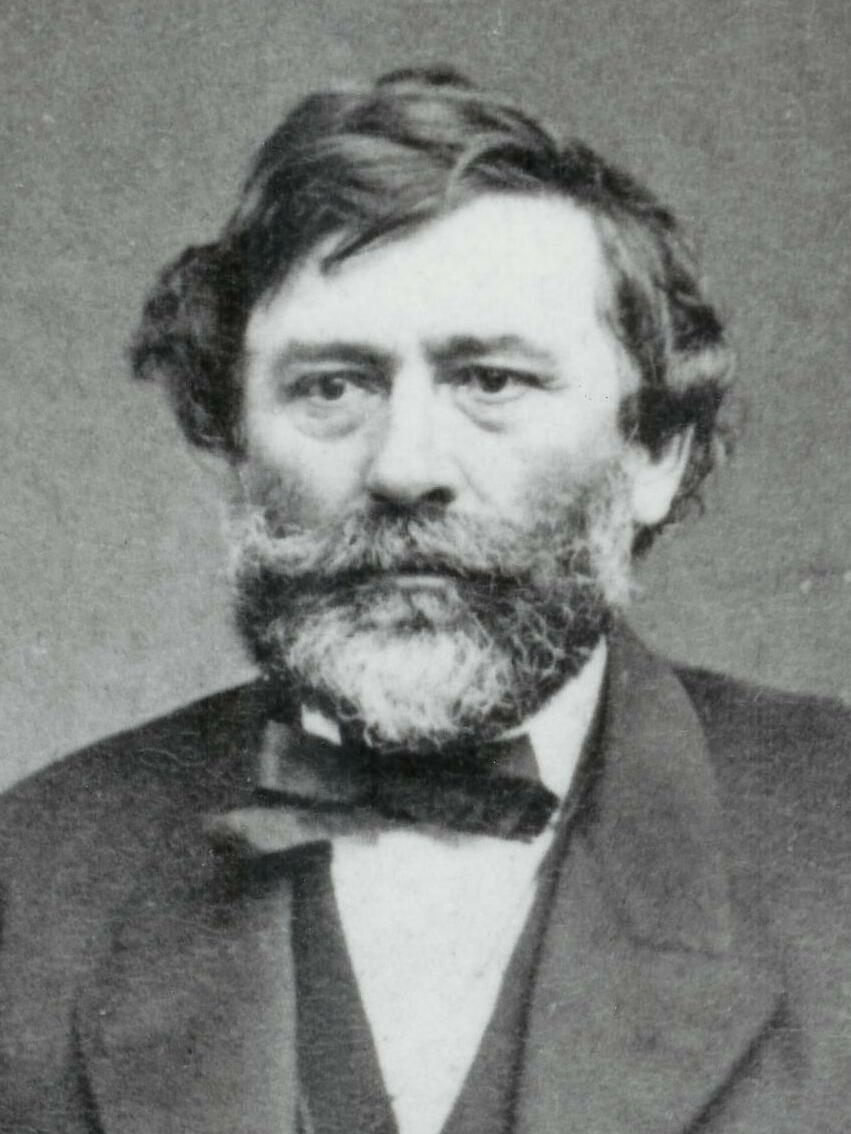
- Born: Haraszthy Ágoston; August 30, 1812; Pest, Kingdom of Hungary, Austrian Empire
- Died: July 6, 1869 (aged 56); Corinto, Nicaragua
- Other names: Count Haraszthy, Father of California Viticulture, Father of Modern Winemaking in California
- Occupations: Nobleman, writer, vintner, town-builder, farmer, livestock owner, store owner, brick maker, steamboat operator, ferryman, wagon master, livery stable operator, stagecoach operator, state legislator, land speculator, refinery owner, assayer, sugar plantation owner, distiller
- Known for: Pioneer winemaker in California
- Spouse: Elenora Dedinszky

Agoston Haraszthy (/ˈɑːɡəstən ˈhærəsti/; Hungarian: Haraszthy Ágoston, Spanish: Agustín Haraszthy; August 30, 1812 – July 6, 1869) was a Hungarian American nobleman, adventurer, traveler, writer, town-builder, and pioneer winemaker in Wisconsin and California, often referred to as the "Father of California Wine", alongside Junípero Serra, as well as the "Father of California Viticulture," or the "Father of Modern Winemaking in California". One of the first men to plant vineyards in Wisconsin, he was the founder of the Buena Vista Winery in Sonoma, California, and an early writer on California wine and viticulture.

He was the first Hungarian to settle permanently in the United States and only the second to write a book about the country in his native language. He is remembered in Wisconsin as the founder of the oldest incorporated village in the state. In San Diego, he is remembered as the first town marshal and the first county sheriff. In California he introduced more than three hundred varieties of European grapes.

== Birth ==
Haraszthy was born in 1812, in Pest, Hungary. He was the only child of Károly Haraszthy and his wife, Anna Mária (née Fischer). It had been previously claimed that he was born in Futak, Hungary, but that was disproved in 1995.

== Nobility ==
The Haraszthys were a Hungarian noble family who traced their roots to Ung county in northeastern Hungary, now part of Hungary, Slovakia and Ukraine. Agoston Haraszthy belonged to the Mokcsai branch of the Haraszthy family, signifying that at one time or another his ancestors owned estates at places called Mokcsa and Haraszth (today villages in Slovakia: Krišovská Liesková, Chrasť nad Hornádom). In Hungary, he was formally known as Mokcsai Haraszthy Ágoston. (In Hungary, family names are written first and given names last. See Hungarian names.) The name has sometimes been written as Agoston Haraszthy de Mokcsa. This is the Latin form of the name, which was used in official government business and in Catholic Church records in Hungary. In the United States, Haraszthy was known as Agoston Haraszthy.

As a Hungarian nobleman, Haraszthy was entitled to be addressed as Spectabilis Dominus (in Latin) or Tekintetes Úr (in Hungarian). These titles were the equivalent of Honorable Sir or Noble Lord in English. When he lived in Wisconsin in the 1840s, the local settlers, mostly German-speaking immigrants, called him "Count" Haraszthy, although he was never addressed by that title in Hungary, California, or Nicaragua. In California, he was addressed as "Colonel" Haraszthy, an honorary designation commonly given to distinguished "gentlemen" and vaguely derived from his military service in Hungary.

== Life in Hungary ==
Both Ágoston and Károly Haraszthy owned estates in a part of southern Hungary called the Bácska, now a part of Serbia. Ágoston's father-in-law was Ferenc Dedinszky, the superintendent of a large estate at Futak on the Danube River where, among other things, vines were cultivated and wine was produced. Both of the Haraszthys were engaged in the wine business in and around Futak.

On January 6, 1833, Ágoston Haraszthy married Eleonóra Dedinszky in Bács-Bodrog County, Hungary. The Dedinszkys were originally a Polish family, though they had lived in Hungary for many centuries and in 1272 were accepted into the Hungarian nobility. Ágoston and Eleonóra Haraszthy were the parents of six children: Géza, Attila, Árpád, Ida (later wife of lawyer Henry Hancock who owned Rancho La Brea), Béla, and Otélia.

== To America ==
Traveling with a maternal cousin named Károly Fischer, Haraszthy left Hungary for the United States in March 1840. Moving through Austria, Germany, and England, Haraszthy and his cousin crossed the Atlantic to New York, then proceeded by way of the Hudson River, the Erie Canal, and the Great Lakes to Wisconsin, eventually settling there. In Haraszthy's own words, he came to America "for one reason only–namely, to see this blessed country for myself."

== Travels in North America ==
Haraszthy was a writer in his native Hungarian, in German (which he spoke from birth as his mother descended from a German family of Old Buda/Altofen), and later in English. When he returned to Hungary in 1842, he made arrangements to write a Hungarian-language book about the United States. He traveled widely through the United States to gather material for the book, which praised American life and enterprise. The two-volume book was published at Pest in 1844 under the title of Utazás Éjszakamerikában (Travels in North America). A second edition was published in 1850. This was the second book about the United States to be published in Hungarian.

== Wisconsin ==
In Wisconsin, Haraszthy and his cousin attempted to settle on some land at Lake Koshkonong. This effort was unsuccessful, however, so they went on to the Sauk Prairie, on the Wisconsin River northwest of Madison. There Haraszthy purchased a large tract of property on the west bank of the river and laid out a town. First called Széptáj (Hungarian for "beautiful place"), later Haraszthy (or Haraszthyville or Haraszthopolis), the town was renamed Westfield and finally Sauk City after Haraszthy left for California in 1849. In 1842, Haraszthy returned to Hungary to bring his parents, wife and children to Wisconsin as permanent residents of the United States. The Haraszthys became United States citizens and never returned to Hungary.

Haraszthy formed a partnership with an Englishman named Robert Bryant and threw himself into a myriad of ambitious projects. Besides the town that he laid out, he built mills, raised corn and other grains, and kept sheep, pigs, and horses. He kept a store and opened a brickyard. Many of the oldest houses still standing in Sauk City were built with bricks from Haraszthy’s brickyard. He owned and operated a steamboat that carried passengers and freight on the Wisconsin and Mississippi Rivers. He donated land on which the first Roman Catholic church and school in Sauk City were built.

On the east side of the Wisconsin River, in what became the Town of Roxbury, Haraszthy planted grapes and dug wine cellars into hillside slopes above the river. The cellars and slopes are today home to the Lake Wisconsin AVA and the Wollersheim Winery, the second oldest winery in the United States, after the Brotherhood Winery in Washingtonville, New York in one of Wisconsin's best-known wine producing regions. Haraszthy, a legendary hunter, built a hunting lodge opposite his home, on a bluff in Roxbury overlooking the river. He also donated 100 acres (40 ha) of land in the town for the founding of a church and for sale at cost to immigrants.

Haraszthy established a ferry that crossed the river, connecting Roxbury with Sauk City. Although he obtained the approval of the Wisconsin Legislature to build a bridge across the river, it was not built, for before he could get the project under way he left Wisconsin for California.

== California ==
=== Across the plains ===
Like many others, Haraszthy was excited by news of the discovery of gold in California in 1848, and by the end of that year he completed plans to leave Wisconsin. Early in 1849, he was elected captain of a train of wagons destined for California via the Santa Fe Trail. Although most California-bound travelers were lured westward by dreams of gold, Haraszthy said that he was going to California "to settle, not for the gold", and that he intended to plant a vineyard near San Diego. Traveling with his entire family, he left Wisconsin in March 1849 and arrived in San Diego the following December.

=== San Diego ===
In San Diego, he formed a partnership with Juan Bandini, a prominent Spanish-Californian, and launched a host of business and agricultural projects. He planted fruit orchards, operated a livery stable and stagecoach line, opened a butcher shop, and organized a syndicate to subdivide a large section of the San Diego Bay shore into streets, parks, and building lots. The land lay between Old Town and New San Diego and was called Middle San Diego, or Middletown. It was informally known in San Diego as “Haraszthyville”. While in San Diego, Haraszthy imported grape vines by mail. Some came from the eastern United States, others from Europe. He planted a vineyard on a tract of land near the San Diego River. On April 1, 1850, in the first election held under the new American administration of California, Haraszthy was elected sheriff of San Diego County. He also served as city marshal. In his capacity as a private contractor, he built a jail for the city of San Diego, which was completed in 1851.

=== California State Assembly ===
Haraszthy was elected to the California State Assembly from San Diego in September 1851. He served from January 5 to May 4, 1852, advancing proposals to relieve flooding on the San Diego River, build a state hospital in San Diego, ease tax burdens on Southern California landowners, replace the debt-ridden San Diego city council with a board of trustees, and provide relief for the indigent in San Diego. He also led an unsuccessful movement to divide California into two states.

=== San Francisco and San Mateo ===
While attending the legislature, Haraszthy began to buy real estate near Mission San Francisco de Asís (Mission Dolores) in San Francisco. His first purchase there was made on March 25, 1852. He tried to raise grapes in San Francisco but found the climate too foggy. He acquired a large tract of land near Crystal Springs on the San Francisco Peninsula (now part of San Mateo County) and planted it to vineyards, but eventually gave up the effort to make wine there, again finding the climate too foggy to ripen the grapes. In both San Francisco and Crystal Springs, Haraszthy continued to import a wide variety of European grape vines and experimented with their planting and cultivation.

In San Francisco, Haraszthy became friendly with a group of Hungarian metallurgists. He formed a partnership under the name of Haraszthy and Uznay and built a large private refinery facility, called the Eureka Gold and Silver Refinery. When a branch of the United States Mint opened in San Francisco in April 1854, Haraszthy became the first U.S. assayer. In August 1855, he became melter and refiner at the Mint. A grand jury investigation of alleged defalcations of gold from the Mint led in September, 1857, to a federal indictment charging Haraszthy with the embezzlement of $151,550 in gold. A long investigation led to the dismissal of the criminal charges. A civil trial then followed, which fully exonerated Haraszthy in February 1861.

=== Sonoma ===
While the mint investigation was pending, Haraszthy moved to Sonoma, about fifty miles north of San Francisco. In 1856, he bought a small vineyard northeast of the town and renamed it Buena Vista. He moved his vines there from Crystal Springs and began to expand the vineyards and hire Charles Krug as his winemaker.

In 1857, he began to bore tunnels into the sides of a nearby mountain and build stone cellars at their entrance. He eventually had two large stone winery buildings, equipped with tunnels and the latest wine-making equipment in California. Haraszthy’s cellars at Buena Vista were the first stone wineries in the state. He added acreage to his original purchase, eventually holding more than 5,000 acres (20 km^{2}) of valley and hillside. He was a proponent of hillside plantings, arguing that vines should be permitted to grow without irrigation. He divided some of his acreage into smaller plots, inducing prominent Californians to come to Sonoma, where he planted vineyards for them. He was a vocal advocate of Chinese immigration, arguing that Chinese should be permitted to come to California and provide much-needed labor. He built a villa in the middle of the Buena Vista vineyards, in which he lived with his family.

=== "Report on Grapes and Wine of California" ===
In 1858, Haraszthy wrote a 19-page “Report on Grapes and Wine of California,” which was published by the California State Agricultural Society. With practical advice for planting vines and making wines, it encouraged the planting of grapes throughout the state. In later years, Haraszthy’s “Report” was recognized as the first treatise on winemaking written and published in California, and praised as the “first American explication of traditional European winemaking practices.”

=== President of State Agricultural Society ===
Haraszthy contributed articles to newspapers and made speeches to gatherings of agriculturalists. He entered his wines in the competition of the California State Fair and received the highest awards. On April 23, 1862, he was elected president of the California State Agricultural Society.

=== Buena Vista Vinicultural Society ===
In 1863, Haraszthy incorporated the Buena Vista Vinicultural Society, the first large corporation in California (perhaps in the United States) organized for the express purpose of engaging in agriculture. With the support of prominent investors, he greatly expanded his vineyards in Sonoma, making wine which was sold as far away as New York. In 1864, an article in Harper's Magazine proclaimed that Buena Vista was “the largest establishment of the kind in the world.

=== Mission to Europe ===
In 1861, Haraszthy was appointed by California Governor John G. Downey as a commissioner to report to the Legislature on the “ways and means best adapted to promote the improvement and growth of the grape-vine in California”. He decided to make a trip to Europe to investigate the best European vine-planting and winemaking practices and to gather cuttings of European vines. He traveled through France, Germany, Switzerland, Spain and also his native Hungary before returning to California in December 1861 with more than 100,000 cuttings of more than 350 different varieties of vines. He offered to sell the vines to the state, propagate them in his Sonoma nursery, test them to determine which were best suited to the California soil and climate, and distribute them to would-be winemakers throughout California. The Legislature refused the offer, leaving Haraszthy to distribute the vines at his own expense. It was a financial setback, as Haraszthy had expended large sums of money in gathering the vines and bringing them back to California.

=== Haraszthy-Vallejo wedding ===
In Sonoma, Haraszthy became friendly with Mariano Guadalupe Vallejo, the former comandante general of Mexican California, founder of Sonoma, and a neighboring landowner and well-respected winemaker.

On June 1, 1863, the Haraszthy and Vallejo families were united in a double wedding, with two of the Haraszthy sons marrying two of the Vallejo daughters. In that wedding, Natalia Vallejo became Mrs. Attila Haraszthy, and Jovita Vallejo became Mrs. Arpad Haraszthy.

One of Agoston Haraszthy's great-grandchildren was actress Natalie Kingston.

=== Phylloxera ===
Haraszthy's management of the Buena Vista Vinicultural Society was both visionary and reckless. He borrowed large sums of money to expand the vineyards and cellars. He employed layering as a planting technique. This resulted in quicker propagation of vines but also exposed the plants to soil diseases. By the middle of the 1860s, the vines at Buena Vista were growing brown and weak. Haraszthy’s critics believed this was due to his layering. In fact, it was the result of the first infestation of the phylloxera ever known in California. Almost unknown before it made its appearance in Sonoma, the phylloxera spread in subsequent years throughout the California vineyards and even crossed the Atlantic to France, where it caused devastation. With production lagging, profits from Buena Vista wine were inadequate to pay the Society’s debt. Shareholders forced Haraszthy out of the Vinicultural Society in 1867 and replaced him with another manager, who tore out all of his layered vines. Haraszthy left Buena Vista for another vineyard in Sonoma owned by his wife. While living there, he filed for bankruptcy.

== In Nicaragua ==
In 1868, Haraszthy left California for Nicaragua. He formed a partnership with a German-born physician and surgeon named Theodore Wassmer and began to develop a large sugar plantation near the seaside port of Corinto, Nicaragua, where he planned to produce rum and sell it in American markets. On July 6, 1869, he disappeared in a river on his Nicaraguan property. Whether he fell into the river and was thereafter washed out to sea, or was dragged under the water by alligators which infested the area, was never finally established. His body was never found.

== Zinfandel controversy ==
The claim that Haraszthy brought the first Zinfandel vines to California is a subject of controversy. In the 1870s and 1880s, Haraszthy's son Arpad Haraszthy stated that his father brought the first Zinfandels to California in the early 1850s, possibly as early as 1852. Arpad was then a well-known sparkling wine producer in San Francisco and President of the California State Board of Viticultural Commissioners, and his statement was widely accepted. A century later, however, California wine historian Charles L. Sullivan began to challenge Arpad's statement.

In 2003, Sullivan published a book in which he showed that other men brought the Zinfandel to the East Coast of the United States as early as the 1820s and to California at unspecified dates in the 1850s. Although Sullivan praised Agoston Haraszthy as a "truly important figure in the history of the American West" and "an important force in the history of California winegrowing", he argues that there is no credible evidence that Haraszthy brought the Zinfandel to California and that Arpad Haraszthy's claim about it was a "myth". In his biography of Haraszthy, however, historian Brian McGinty presents evidence that Haraszthy may well have obtained Zinfandel vines as early as 1852 with the help of Lázár Mészáros, former Hungarian Minister of War and an avid horticulturalist who was then operating a nursery in New Jersey. This evidence would tend to corroborate Arpad Haraszthy's recollections. Sullivan does not discuss it in his book, thus leaving the issue in controversy.

== Vintners Hall of Fame ==
In March 2007, Haraszthy was inducted into the Vintners Hall of Fame by the Culinary Institute of America. Seventy wine journalists cast ballots, honoring Haraszthy for his contributions to the early development of the wine industry in California. The award was accepted in Haraszthy's behalf by his great-great grandson, Vallejo Haraszthy.

== See also ==
- History of California wine
- History of San Diego, California
- Hungarian Americans
- List of California Historical Landmarks
- List of people who disappeared
- National Register of Historic Places listings in Sonoma County, California
- Sonoma County wine
- Wisconsin wine

== Works consulted ==
- Balzer, Robert Lawrence. Wines of California. New York: Harry N. Abrams, 1978. ISBN 978-0-8109-0750-8
- Beard, James A. “Shopping for California Wines,” House and Garden, August 1956.
- Carosso, Vincent P. The California Wine Industry. Berkeley: University of California Press, 1951, 408.
- Darlington, David. Angel’s Visits: An Inquiry into the Mystery of Zinfandel. New York, Henry Holt, 1991.
- Feleky, Charles. “Agoston Haraszthy de Mokcsa,” in Allen Johnson and Dumas Malone (eds.) Dictionary of American Biography, Vol. 4. New York: Charles Scribner’s Sons, 1931, 236–237.
- Haraszthy, Agoston. Grape Culture, Wines, and Wine-Making, with Notes Upon Agriculture and Horticulture. New York: Harper & Brothers, 1862.
- Haraszthy, Agoston. “Report on Grapes and Wine of California.” In Transactions of the California State Agricultural Society During the Year 1858. Sacramento: John O’Meara, State Printer, 1859, pp. 311–329.
- “The Haraszthy Family,” manuscript, Bancroft Library, University of California, Berkeley.
- Hutchinson, John N. “The Astonishing Hungarian.” Wine and Food [London], No. 137 (Spring 1968).
- Johnson, Hugh. Vintage: The Story of Wine. New York: Simon and Schuster, 1989.
- Jones, Idwal. Vines in the Sun. New York: William Morrow, 1949.
- McGinty, Brian. Haraszthy at the Mint. Los Angeles: Dawson’s Book Shop, 1975.
- McGinty, Brian. Strong Wine: The Life and Legend of Agoston Haraszthy. Stanford University Press, 1998. ISBN 978-0-8047-3145-4
- Mokcsai Haraszthy Ágoston, Utazas Éjszakamerikában. Pest [Hungary]: Heckenast Gusztáv, 1844. 2 vols.
- Parish of Futtak. Marriage Register, January 6, 1833.
- Penhinou, Ernest P., and Sidney S. Greenleaf. A Dictionary of Wine Growers and Wine Makers in 1860. Berkeley: Tamalapais Press, 1967.
- Pinney, Thomas. A History of Wine in America. Berkeley: University of California Press, 1989.
- Sullivan, Charles L. “A Man Named Agoston Haraszthy.” Parts 1–3. Vintage Magazine, February–April, 1980.
- Sullivan, Charles L. A Companion to California Wine. Berkeley and Los Angeles: University of California Press, 1998.
- Sullivan, Charles L. Zinfandel: A History of a Grape and Its Wine. Berkeley and Los Angeles: University of California Press, 2003.
- St. Francis Solano Church, Sonoma, California. Register of Marriages.
- Wait, Frona Eunice. Wines and Vines of California. San Francisco: Bancroft Company, 1889.
- ”Wine-Making in California,” Harper’s New Monthly Magazine 29 (1864).

Preceded by	Sheriff of San Diego County; 1850–1851	Succeeded by George F. Hooper, 1852–1853
