= Sonoma Barracks =

19th century adobe barracks in California

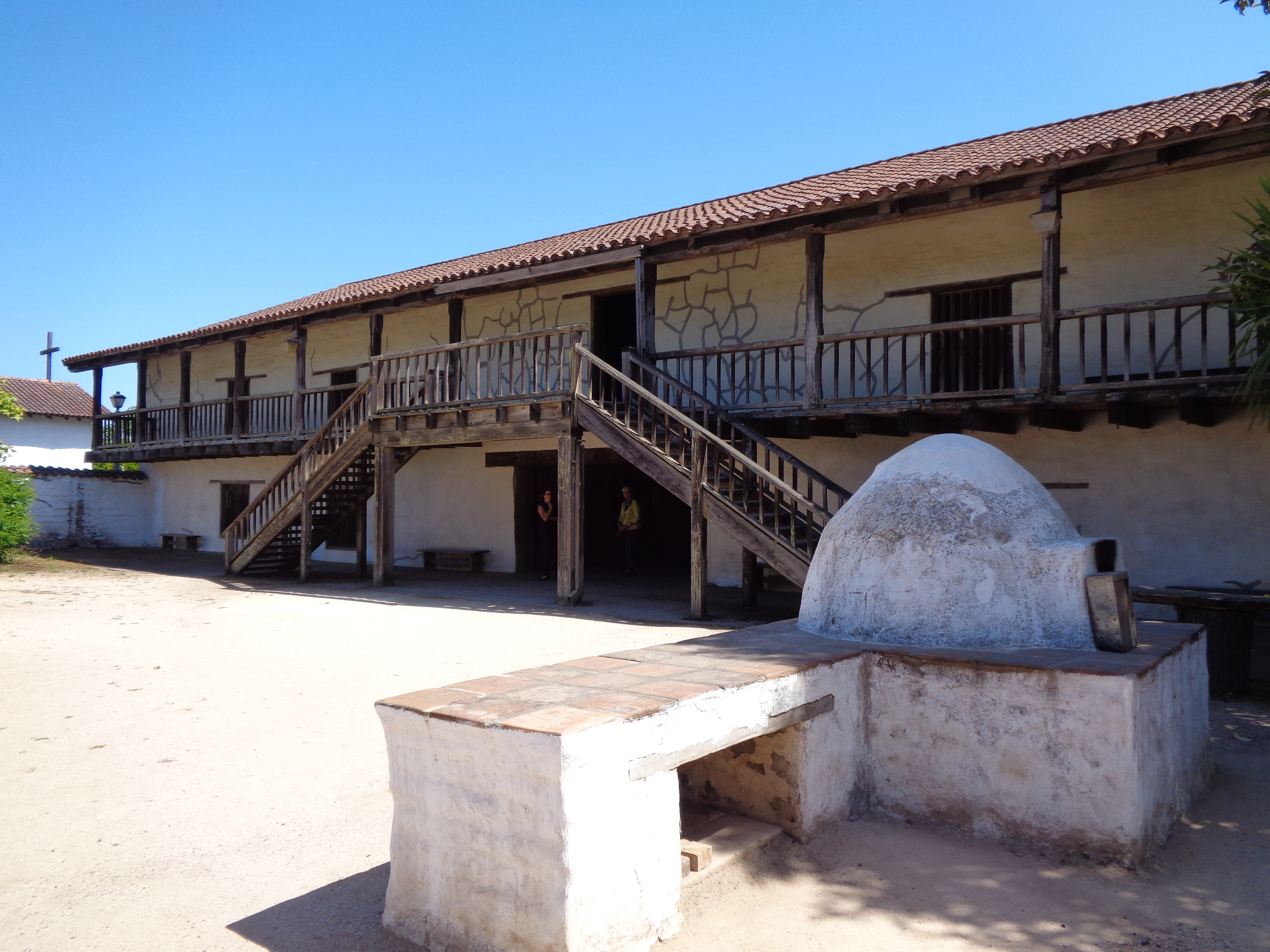
- Sonoma Barracks in 2018

- Location within California
- 38.2937°N 122.4566°W
- Location: Spain Street & First Street East, Sonoma, California

History
- Built: 1836

California Historical Landmark
- Reference no.: 316

The Sonoma Barracks (Spanish: Cuartel de Sonoma) is a two-story, wide-balconied, adobe building facing the central plaza of the City of Sonoma, California. It was built by order of Mariano Guadalupe Vallejo to house the Mexican soldiers that had been transferred from the Presidio of San Francisco in 1835. The Presidio Company and their commander, Vallejo, were also responsible for controlling the Native Americans living on the northern border of Mexican California.

On June 14, 1846, the Pueblo of Sonoma was taken over by a group of American immigrants seeking to establish their own California Republic. The barracks became the headquarters of this short-lived insurrection later known as the Bear Flag Revolt.

Believing that war with Mexico had been declared, ships of the U.S. Pacific Squadron took over Monterey on July 7 and Yerba Buena (now San Francisco) on July 9, 1846. The U.S. flag was raised at the barracks that same day – ending the California Republic and the Bear Flag Revolt. After that, the barracks was used by U.S. forces until 1852. Throughout the Mexican–American War and the subsequent California Gold Rush these forces continued to confront Native Americans hostile to invaders occupying their lands.

When the military left, the building was used for a number of civilian purposes until being acquired by the State of California in 1957. The Sonoma Barracks is now part of Sonoma State Historic Park.

== Mexican Military ==
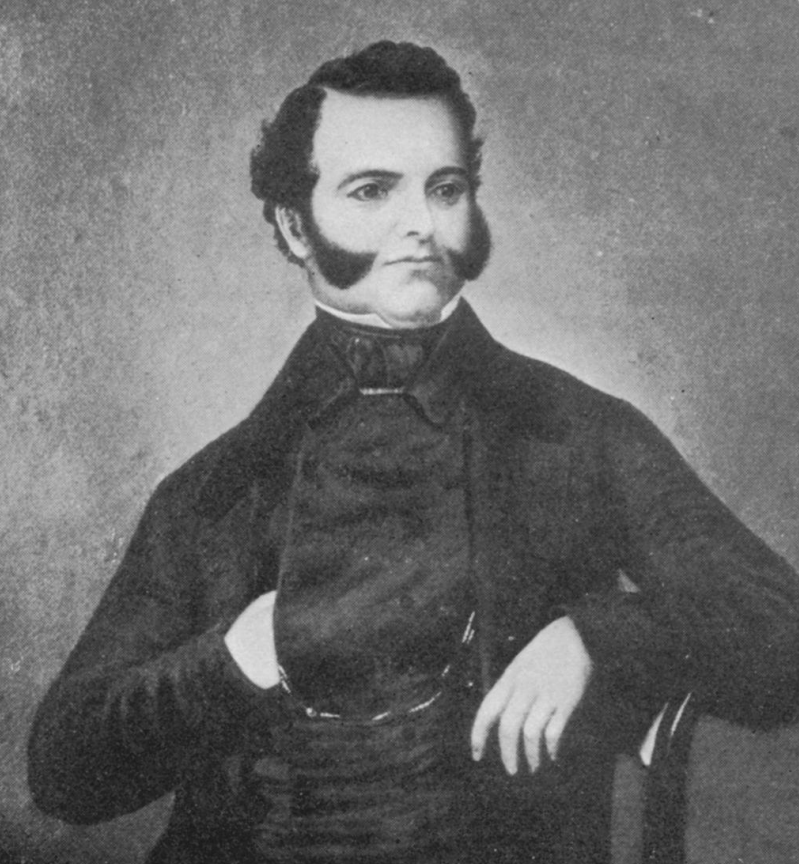
Mariano Vallejo as a Young Man

Soldiers of the Company of the National Presidio at San Francisco (Compania de Presidio Nacional de San Francisco) moved to the site of the recently secularized Mission San Francisco Solano in 1835. California Governor Jose Figueroa had ordered the Company north from the Presidio of San Francisco as part of his plan to comply with instructions from the national government to establish a strong garrison in the region north of the San Francisco Bay to protect the area from encroachments of foreigners. An immediate concern was further eastward movement of the Russian America Company from their settlements on the California coast. Construction of the barracks was episodic: digging the foundation began in 1837, construction of the adobe walls in 1839 and the building was more or less completed in 1840 to '41. Until the building was habitable the troops were housed in the buildings of the old Mission. While the barracks was built to house troops, most of the space was used as a headquarters and for supply, equipment and weapons storage.

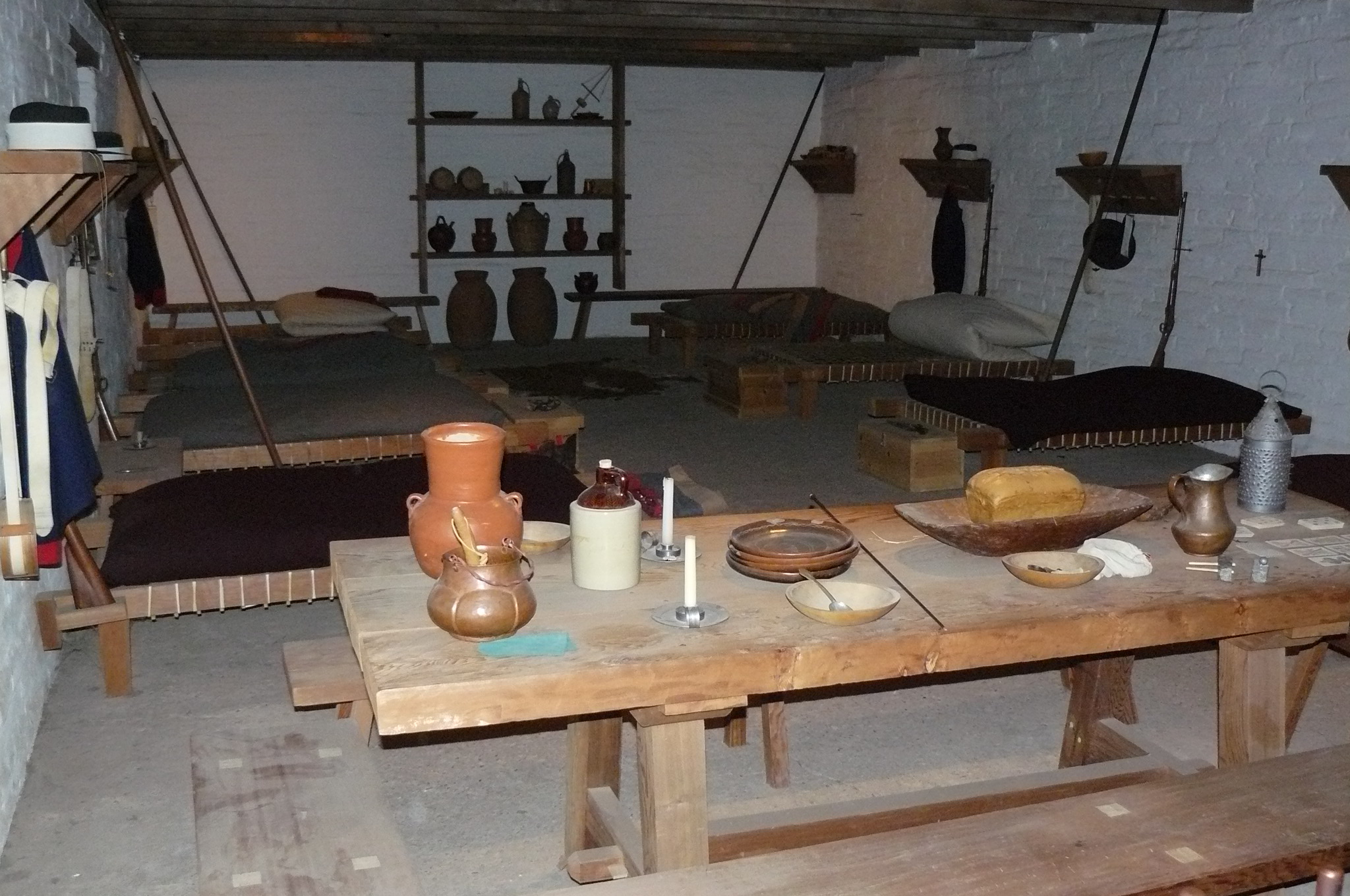
Interior of the barracks.

The company's commander, Lieutenant Mariano Guadalupe Vallejo, was named military commander of the Northern Frontier, thus taking responsibility for maintaining control over the Native population north of the Bay. Vallejo's approach to controlling the border region combined direct military action, treaties with native groups, and by forming alliances with Indian leaders on the west (Chief Marin) and east (Chief Solano - who provided auxiliary men when the Company was fighting other Native groups). While based in Sonoma, the Company participated in over 100 activities to maintain control over the areas Native peoples. Bancroft opines that “…Vallejo’s Indian policy must be regarded as excellent and effective when compared to any other policy ever followed in California.”

The Company did receive support in money and materiel from the Mexican and California governments, but Vallejo absorbed the deficits out of his own funds. All the other presidial companies in Alta California had been replaced by civilian militias by the time the San Francisco Company moved to Sonoma.

Lieutenant Colonel Vallejo disbanded the Presidial Company on November 28, 1844, with the plea that he could not longer afford paying for them. Among his other reasons may have been avoiding being drawn into a rebellion against Governor Micheltorena by his nephew Juan Alvarado and childhood friend José Castro. After releasing the soldiers, Vallejo retained the weapons and military supplies stored in the barracks for the use of the civilian militia. (Nine old cannon of various sizes, two hundred long infantry muskets, fifty carbines, cannon and musket balls and a small amount of black powder.) The Sonoma Barracks was also, for a short period, the home and headquarters of the Compania de Infanteria Permanente de Sonoma, a regular Mexican Infantry Company composed of young, not-so-willing Californio draftees.

== Bear Flag Revolt ==
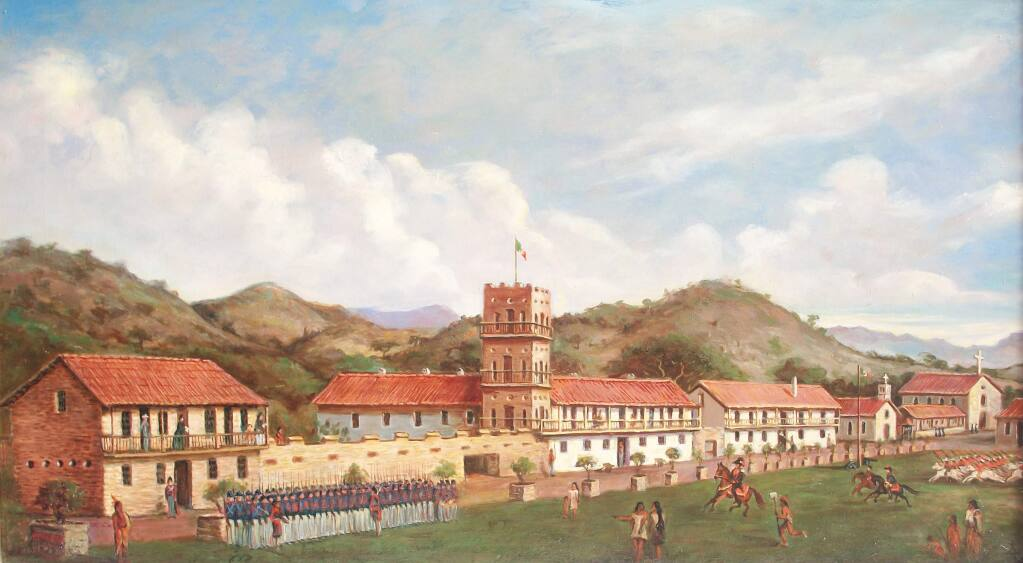
General Mariano Guadalupe Vallejo reviewing his troops outside of the barracks, 1846.

On June 10, 1846, a group of dissatisfied and fearful American immigrants with a murky relationship to U.S. Army Brevet Captain John Charles Frémont had captured a herd of Californian government horses which they feared would be used against them. They next determined to seize the Pueblo of Sonoma to deny the Californians a rallying point north of San Francisco Bay. Capturing the arms and military materiel (stored in the barracks) and Lieutenant Colonel Vallejo would delay any military response from the Californians.

Before dawn on Sunday, June 14, 1846, thirty-three of the American rebels arrived in Sonoma. They accomplished their objectives, without ever firing a shot, by 11:00 AM. At that time, Vallejo and three of his associates were placed on horseback and taken to Frémont near Sacramento with eight or nine of the insurgents who did not favor forming a new republic. The barracks became the headquarters for the remaining twenty-five, who founded the new California Republic and created its Bear Flag. The rebellion subsequently became known as the Bear Flag Revolt.

Other immigrants and their families began moving into Sonoma to be under the protection of the muskets and cannon taken from the barracks. Some families were housed in the barracks – others in the homes of the Californians.

Emblem of the Bear Flag used at Sonoma

Captain John Charles Frémont and his mapping expedition group arrived in Sonoma on June 24, throwing off any pretense of neutrality. On July 5 Frémont proposed to the Bears that they unite with his party and form a single military group under his command. A compact was drawn up which all volunteers of the California Battalion signed or made their mark. The next day Frémont, leaving the fifty men of Company B at the barracks, left with the rest of the Battalion for Sutter's Fort. They took with them two of the captured field pieces as well as muskets, a supply of ammunition, blankets, horses, and cattle.

== United States Military ==
27 Star US Flag

Seven weeks after war with Mexico had been declared in Washington, D.C., Commodore John D. Sloat, commander of the U.S. Navy's Pacific Squadron, after being assured that war with Mexico had been declared, instructed the captains of his ships to occupy Monterey on July 7 and Yerba Buena (now San Francisco) on July 9. Early on July 9 - Navy Lt. Joseph Revere was sent to Sonoma carrying two 27-star United States flags for the Sonoma Barracks and Sutter's Fort (the squadron had run out of new flags that reflected Texas’ admittance to the Union). Raising the Stars and Stripes in front of the barracks marked the end of the Bear Flag Revolt and the California Republic.

The majority of the California Battalion was transported to San Diego by the U.S. Navy to assist in securing California for the United States. The barracks served as housing for a number of former Bears and their families after the California Battalion left. Most of those remaining Bears eventually returned to their homes. The Sonoma Alcalde complained to the U.S. Navy about the lack of protection for the town and a detachment of U.S. Marines was assigned to the Sonoma Barracks. The Navy completed the planking of the second floor, raised the roof and replaced the roof tile with shingles.

In March, 1847, the Marines were replaced by Company C of the 1st Regiment of New York Volunteers, known as Stevenson's Regiment. The enlistments of the New York Volunteers ended with the war, and they were replaced in May 1849, by 37 men of Company C, 1st U.S. Dragoons, moved arrived with Stephen W. Kearny's famous 2,000-mile march from Fort Leavenworth to San Diego. After a temporary posting in Los Angeles, Company C moved into the barracks and established Camp Sonoma. Additional units that were posted to the barracks from 1849 to 1852 included Companies A and K of the 1st U.S. Dragoons, Company E of the U.S. Regiment of Mounted Rifles, and small detachments from the 2nd U.S. Infantry, the 1st U.S. Artillery, and the 3rd U.S. Artillery. Sonoma lost its military population in January 1852, when the troops moved to Benicia and other assignments in California and Oregon. The Army continued to use part of the barracks as a supply depot until August 1853.

Soon after the military left the building Vallejo filed a claim of $20,600 with the U.S. Army for back-rent. After several years the claim reached the Court of Claims where it was contested by the U.S. Solicitor General on a number of bases. The Court awarded Vallejo a reduced amount ($12,600) based upon a lower rental rate and shorter rental period than was originally claimed.

== Civilian Uses ==
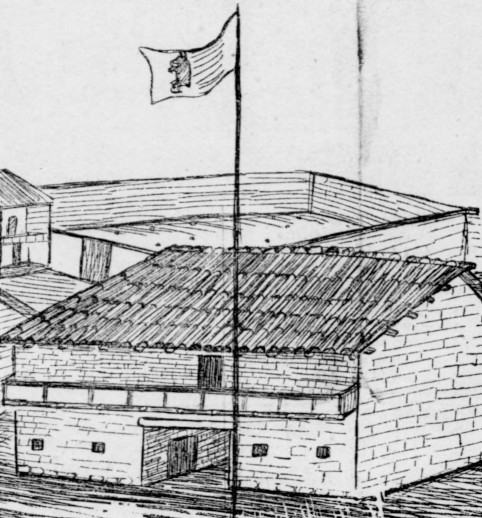
The barracks in 1896

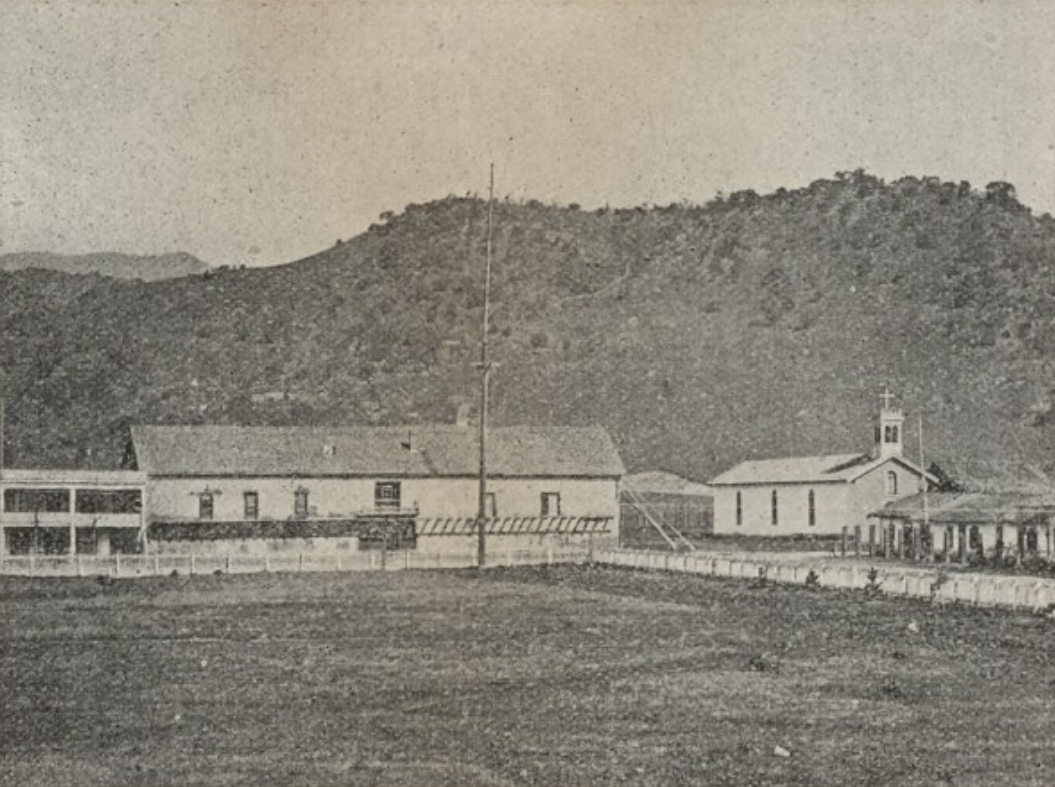
Photograph in 1867

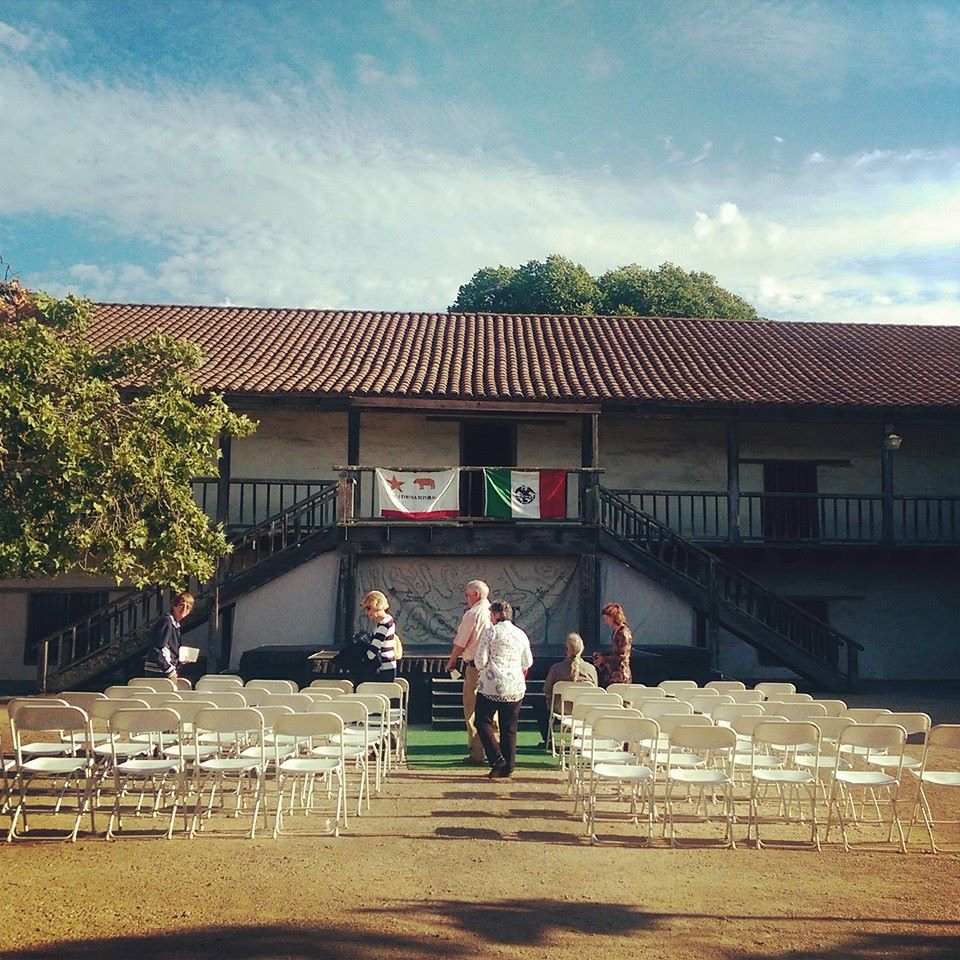
In July 2014, the barracks was used as the location for a play.

Alexander J. Cox rented the two eastern rooms of the first floor from Vallejo and published the Sonoma Bulletin from 1852 to 1855. Shortly after Cox left, Vallejo established a winery in the building. In 1862, he leased wine-making equipment in the building to Dr. Victor Faure for $50 per month for a five-year period. Vallejo retained the right to use the equipment and store wine in the cellar. Other parts of the building were leased in 1865 to the Aguillon family as a residence. Vallejo's two sons, Uladislao and Napoleon, leased part of the building in 1872-73 for their winemaking operation in exchange for one quarter of the profits. Mr. Newman rented part of the building in 1877 to grow silk worms experimentally.

Vallejo sold the barracks building to Solomon Shocken, June 15, 1879. Shocken remodeled the exterior, including a Victorian facade, and sold agricultural implements and groceries. The building retained the Victorian image until the 1930s when it was purchased and refurbished by Walter and Celeste Murphy, owners of the Sonoma Index-Tribune, who lived in the building until 1957. It was then acquired and restored to its appearance at the time of the Bear Flag Revolt by the State of California and made part of the Sonoma State Historic Park.

== California Historical Landmark ==
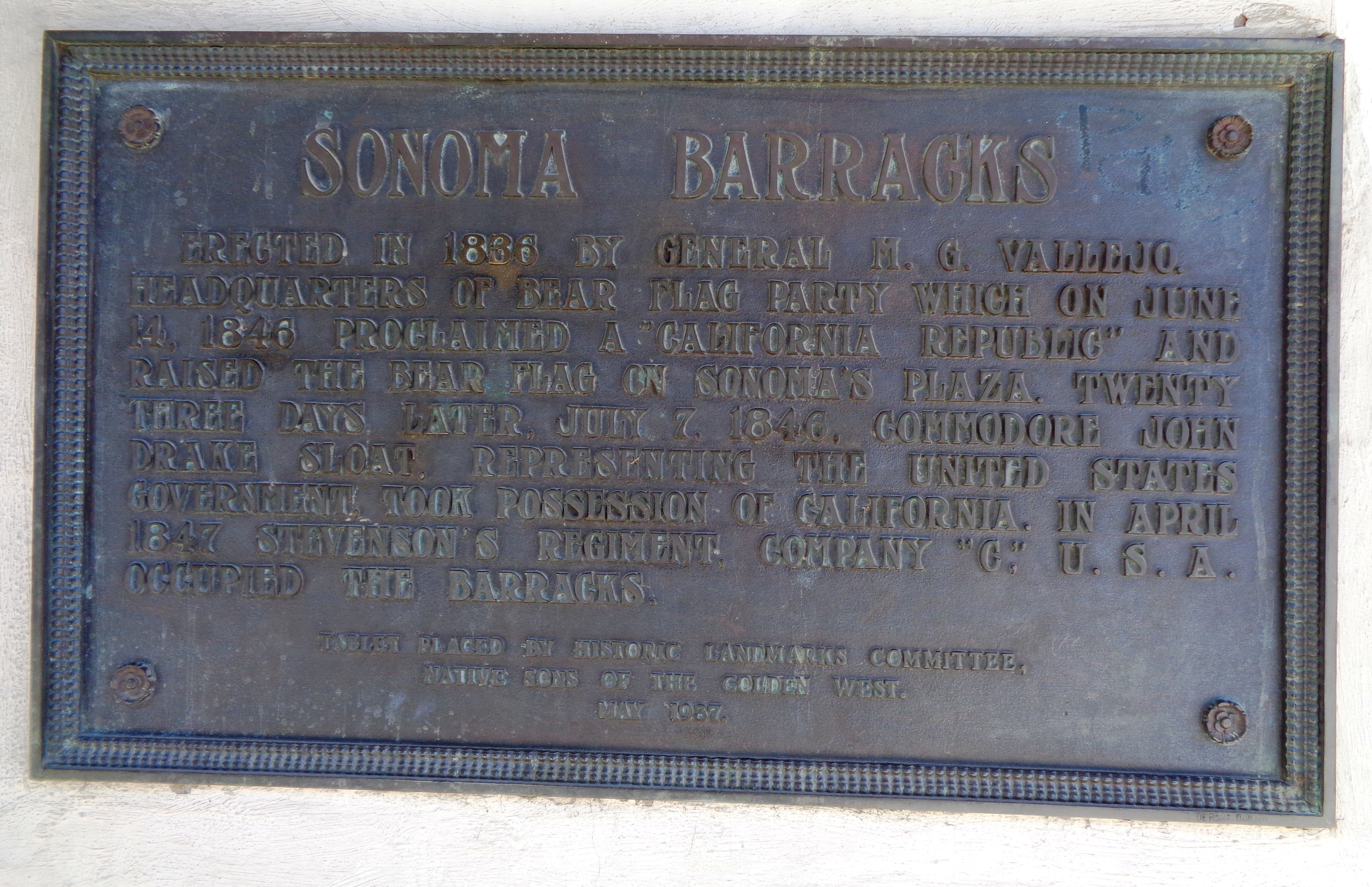
Sonoma Barracks. A Commemorative plaque

On May 19, 1937, the Native Sons of the Golden West placed a bronze commemorative plaque in the adobe wall of the barracks, marking the building, erected in 1836, as the spot in which the Bear Flag was designed and made.

The Presidio Of Sonoma (Sonoma Barracks) is listed as California Historical Landmark No. 316.

== See also ==
- Mission San Francisco Solano
- Rancho Petaluma Adobe
