= Blue Wing Inn =

Historic hotel in Sonoma County, California

Coordinates: 38.2934°N 122.4556°W

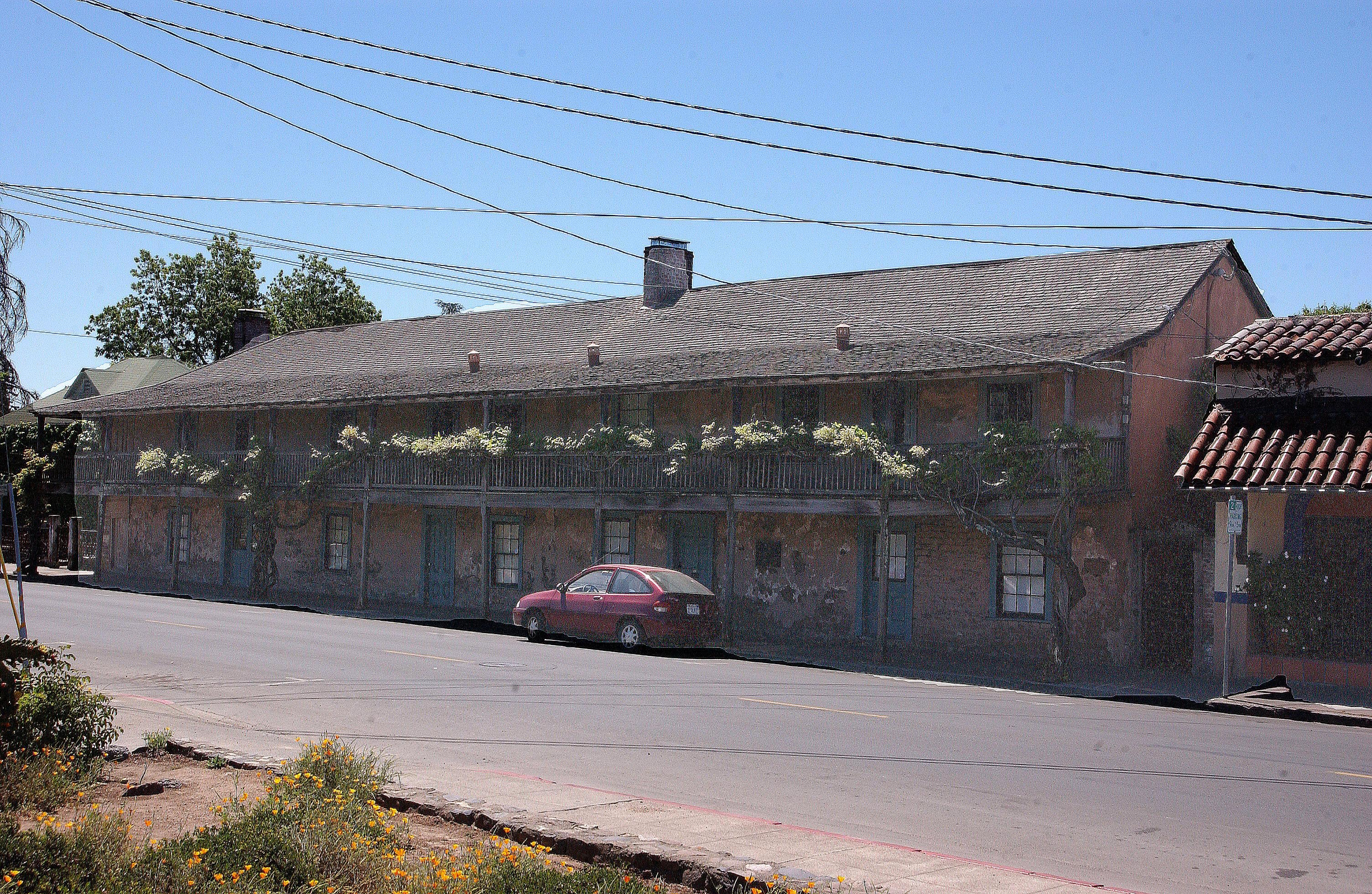
- Blue Wing Inn
- Interactive map of Blue Wing Inn
- Location: Sonoma, California

California Historical Landmark
- Official name: Blue Wing Inn
- Designated: 1932
- Reference no.: 17

The Blue Wing Inn in Sonoma, California, was one of the first hotels built in the state north of San Francisco. What began as the first property transfer in the new Pueblo de Sonoma and a simple adobe residence transformed with time and the addition of more rooms into a storied landmark. During the California Gold Rush, it was used by miners going to and from the gold fields and by the U.S. Army soldiers stationed in Sonoma. After many years, owners, and uses, the Blue Wing Inn was purchased by the State of California in 1968 and is currently under study for its best use as part of Sonoma State Historic Park.

== Majordomo's residence ==
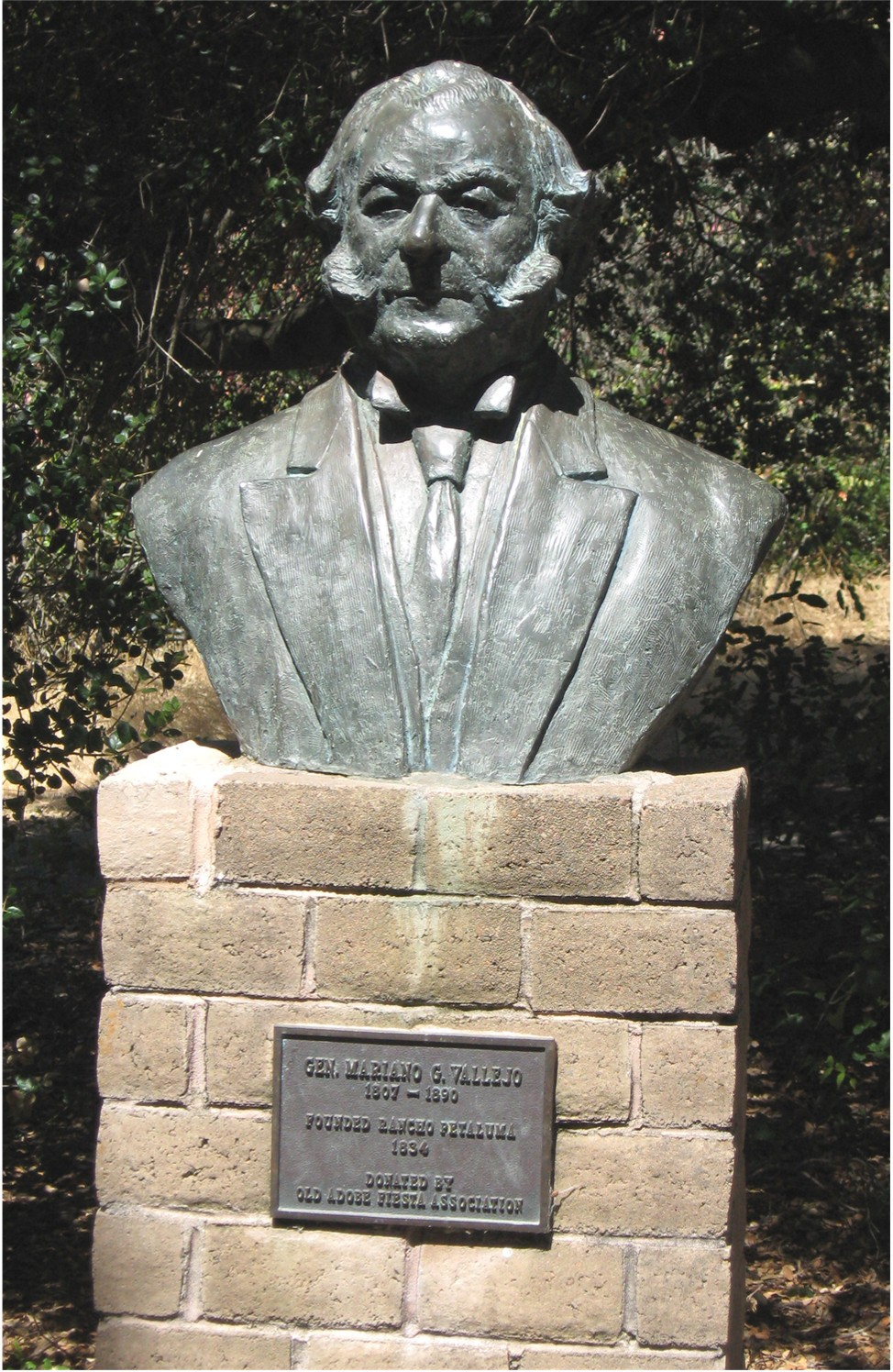
Mariano G. Vallejo

Mariano Vallejo was named administrator (comisionado) to oversee the closing of Mission San Francisco Solano. With the assistance of William A. Richardson he laid out, in accordance with the Spanish Laws of the Indies, the streets and lots of the new Pueblo de Sonoma. The first recorded property transaction was Vallejo's granting of the east half of the lot 35 to Antonio Ortega, Vallejo's new majordomo, to whom Vallejo had delegated the day-to-day work of secularization of the Mission. This lot was across the street from the front of the old Mission's main building. It isn't known if there was already an adobe structure on lot 35. Other California missions had a dwelling for their majordomo located close to both their neophytes ranchería and the padre's quarters. Fr. Quijas, the parish priest, soon complained about Ortega's treatment of the Native Americans. It wasn't until the summer of 1837, because of new scandals and unsatisfactory accounts, that Vallejo removed Ortega as majordomo. Ortega continued to live in the adobe and established a tavern (pulqueria) that continued to operate until August 1848.

== Sonoma House / Blue Wing Inn ==
The property was purchased from Ortega by James C. Cooper and Thomas Spriggs on August 15, 1849 (the transfer was witnessed by Vallejo). Cooper and Spriggs soon expanded the hotel to incorporate a gambling hall and a saloon. They added a second story with a wood-frame balcony and stairway to provide access to the second floor rooms. The building had the appearance of a typical Monterey Style adobe. In 1852, they completed a 35’ by 35’ two story adobe addition abutting the west end of the original structure. According to reports of travelers, the dining room and kitchen were located in the east room of the first floor. The central room served as the gambling room and the westernmost housed the saloon and business office. On the second floor, the west and central rooms housed overnight guests. For a time, Cooper housed his family in the eastern room.

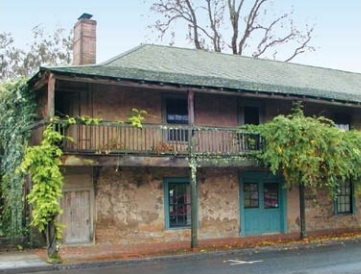
Blue Wing Inn (front)

The hotel was known as Sonoma House. This was the name of an earlier business that Cooper and a different partner had operated near the southeastern corner of the Sonoma's plaza. Thomas Spriggs died in May 1851 and soon thereafter the name of the inn was changed to Blue Wing Inn. The reason for the change isn't clearly known but there was a very popular saloon at 138 Montgomery Street in San Francisco and Cooper may have been wanting to take advantage of that popularity. Stories and myths about goings on at Sonoma House and the Blue Wing Inn are plentiful. Among the notables said to have stayed, gambled, or drank there are Joseph Hooker, Philip Kearny, Ulysses S. Grant, William T. Sherman, John C. Fremont, Lotta Crabtree, and Joaquin Murrieta.

Cooper and his family lived on a ranch he had purchased from Mariano Vallejo. He prospered from both the Inn and the ranch and became the second wealthiest man in Sonoma (after Vallejo). He was stabbed and killed on September 5, 1856, in a fight with D. M. Graham, the local schoolmaster. Graham had administered a severe whipping to Cooper's two sons. According to the San Francisco newspaper Daily Alta California, in stories published on September 8 and 13, the killing was determined to be in self-defense.

Shortly before his death, Cooper sold the Blue Wing Inn to his attorney, State Senator Martin E. Cooke. After Cooke's death in 1858 the Inn went through a succession of owners. Patrick Hayne owned and operated the property as the "Blue Wing Tavern" until 1863 when the tavern was sold to Margaret Hayne who, with her husband, sold it to John Tivnen in 1867.

== Later uses ==
The uses of the building during John Tivnen's twenty-five years of ownership are unclear. It did not remain a hotel or gambling hall past 1880 and may have functioned as a stagecoach depot. The 1888 Sanborn fire insurance map indicates the building had been enlarged by a wood-frame addition on the west end and most of the building was used for making and storing wine. The same map shows that the central room on the first floor was occupied by a grocer named Monferdini and the east room housed a clothing store. Eva Rideout inherited the property when Tivnen died in 1892. She sold the property to Agostino Pinelli for $425 on February 4, 1895. He was a vintner and probably had been the main tenant in the building. He continued to make wine in the building until the 1919 Volstead Act brought Prohibition. Italian workers, employed by the family, were housed on the second floor.

Some histories record that the Blue Wing figured in Pinelli's famous use of the contents of his wine tank to help put out the Sonoma fire of September 23, 1911. The tank was held in a cellar of a building adjacent to the Blue Wing but Pinelli did help stop the fire and the Blue Wing only suffered a scorched roof.

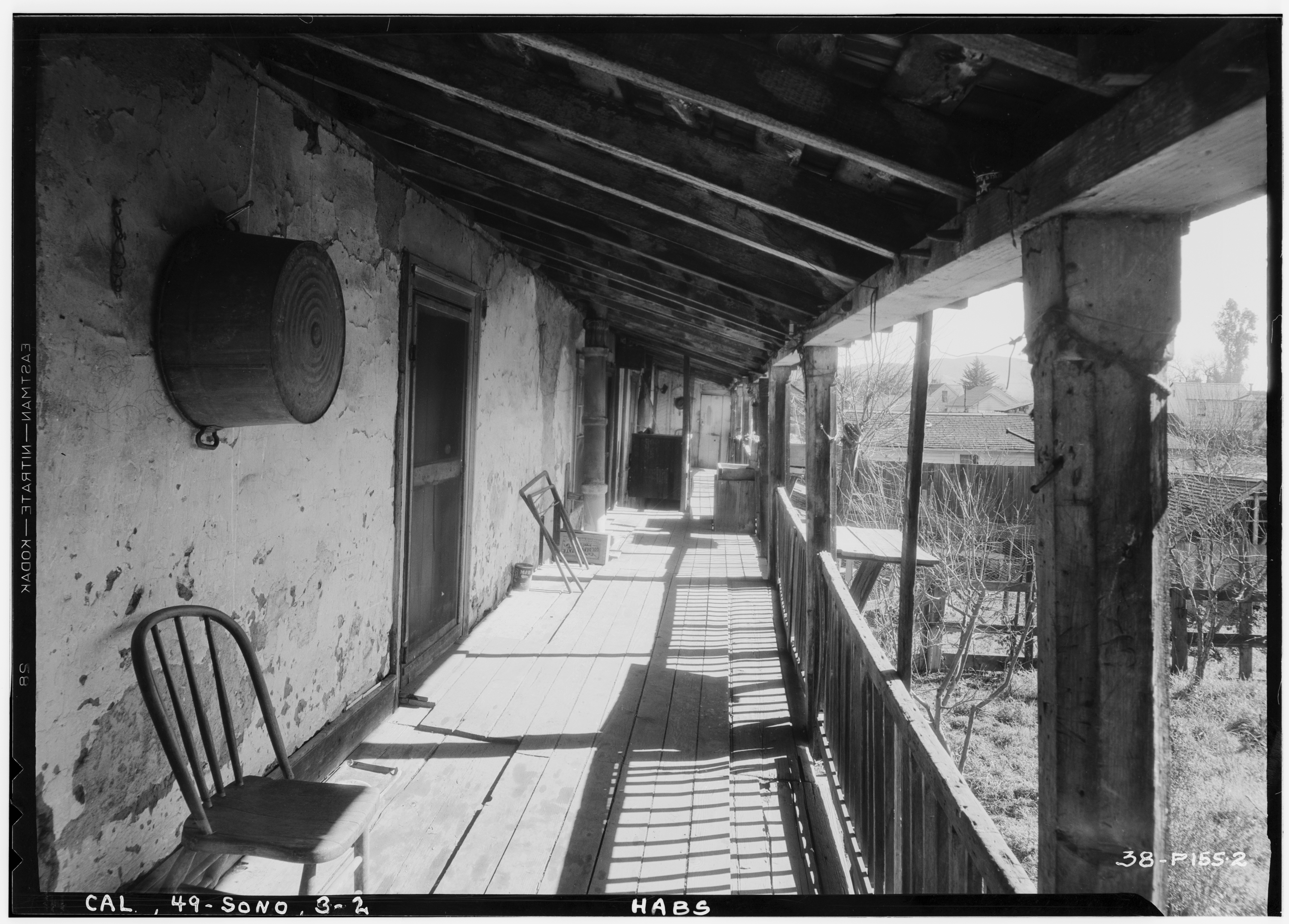
South Balcony - Second Story (Rear) - 1934

Agostino Pinelli died in 1925 and left the property to his wife Rosa. During this period the Sonoma Chamber of Commerce moved into the first floor where the ‘Blue Wing Museum’ began operating. The long-neglected building fell into disrepair. In 1939, a writer for the Federal Writers' Project described the Blue Wing as "shabby". By then, it was in part used as a museum that contained various memorabilia, including a music box that "still tinkles when fed coins" and a fire engine, Sonoma's first, whose painted decorations were described as "faded birds and flowers".

The Pinelli family was considering tearing the Blue Wing building down until Rosa Pinelli, on September 15, 1941, sold it for $2,500 to San Francisco socialite Alma de Bretteville Spreckels and her second husband Elmer M. Awl. The headline on the August 29, 1941 edition of the Sonoma Index-Tribune read “Sonoma’s Old Landmark is Saved by Elmer Awl”. The Awls did some much-needed repairs to the building and demolished the wooden western addition but soon divorced. The building was sold in 1945 to Walter and Celeste Murphy and three years later to William Henry and Eleanora Bosworth Black.

The Blacks, who owned the Blue Wing for over twenty years, began a succession of restoration projects. They patched missing adobe brick then applied stucco and whitewash to the walls. They added a new concrete slab and converted several exterior openings - windows to doors and vice versa. They converted the second floor into residential units and installed new wood floors to the ground floor rooms. After restorative work, the Blue Wing became a retail center on the first floor with residential rentals on the second.

In 1968, the California Department of Parks and Recreation acquired it, intending to make it into a house museum, but funding problems prevented this. The state repaired and re-roofed it in 1984. The Blue Wing Adobe Trust was founded in 2010 and the following year formed a partnership with Parks and Recreation to fully restore it and find an appropriate reuse.
