= Sonoma State Historic Park =

State park in California

Coordinates: 38°17′48″N 122°27′47″W

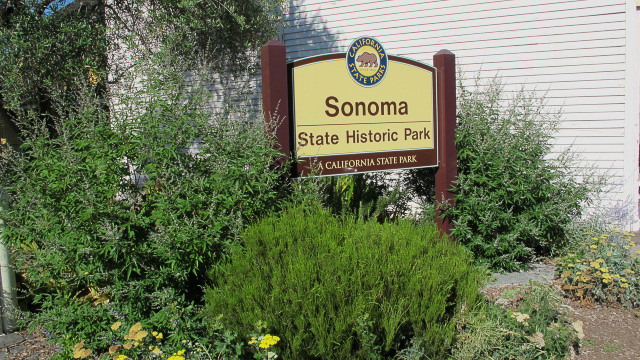
Sonoma State Historic Park

Sonoma State Historic Park is a California State Park located in the center of Sonoma, California. The park consists of six sites: the Mission San Francisco Solano, the Sonoma Barracks (sometimes called the Presidio of Sonoma), the Blue Wing Inn, La Casa Grande, Lachryma Montis, and the Toscano Hotel.

The park was founded in 1909 and originally contained only the Mission San Francisco Solano. The State of California has, over the years, added additional historic locations to the Park. Many of the added venues were associated with the life of Mariano Guadalupe Vallejo who was central to secularization of the Mission; the founding and improvement of the Mexican pueblo of Sonoma; and, the development of Sonoma as an American city.

== Historic Sites ==
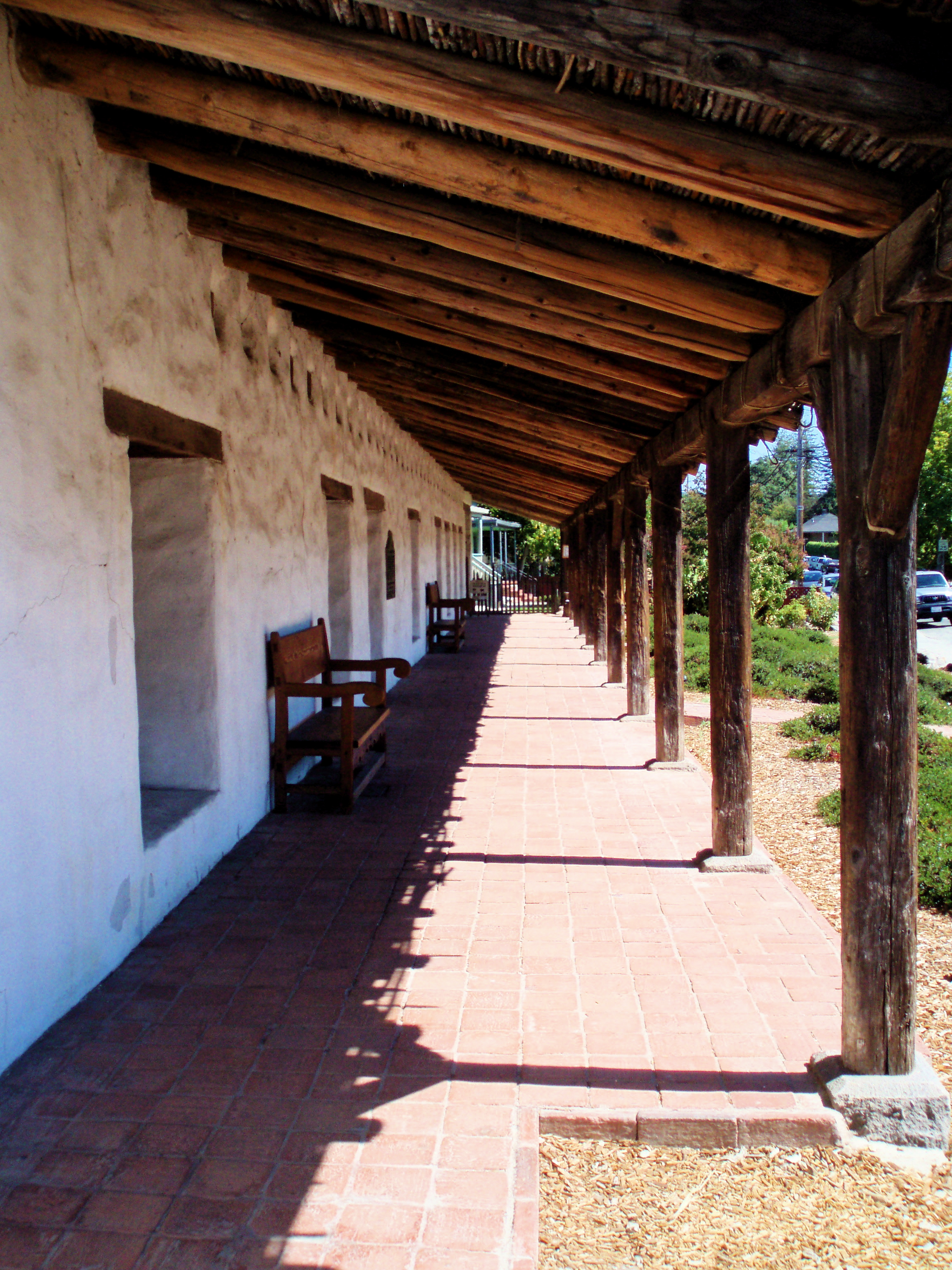
The Mission San Francisco Solano

=== Mission San Francisco Solano ===
Mission San Francisco Solano was the 21st, last (founded in 1823) and northernmost mission in Alta California. It was the only mission built in Alta California after Mexico gained independence from Spain. The California Governor wanted a robust Mexican presence north of the San Francisco Bay to keep the Russians who had established Fort Ross on the Pacific coast from moving further inland. A young Franciscan friar from Mission San Francisco de Asis wanted to move to a location with a better climate and access to a larger number of potential converts.

In 1833 the Mexican Congress decided to close all of the missions in Alta California. Governor Figueroa issued a regulation (Reglamento Provisional para la secularizacion de las Misiones) on August 9, 1834, outlining the requirements for the distribution of property (land, cattle and equipment) to each mission's neophytes. Mariano Vallejo was appointed administrator (comisionado) to oversee the closing of the Mission.

The Mission was successful given its short eleven year life but was smaller in number of converts and with lower productivity and diversity of industries than the older California missions.

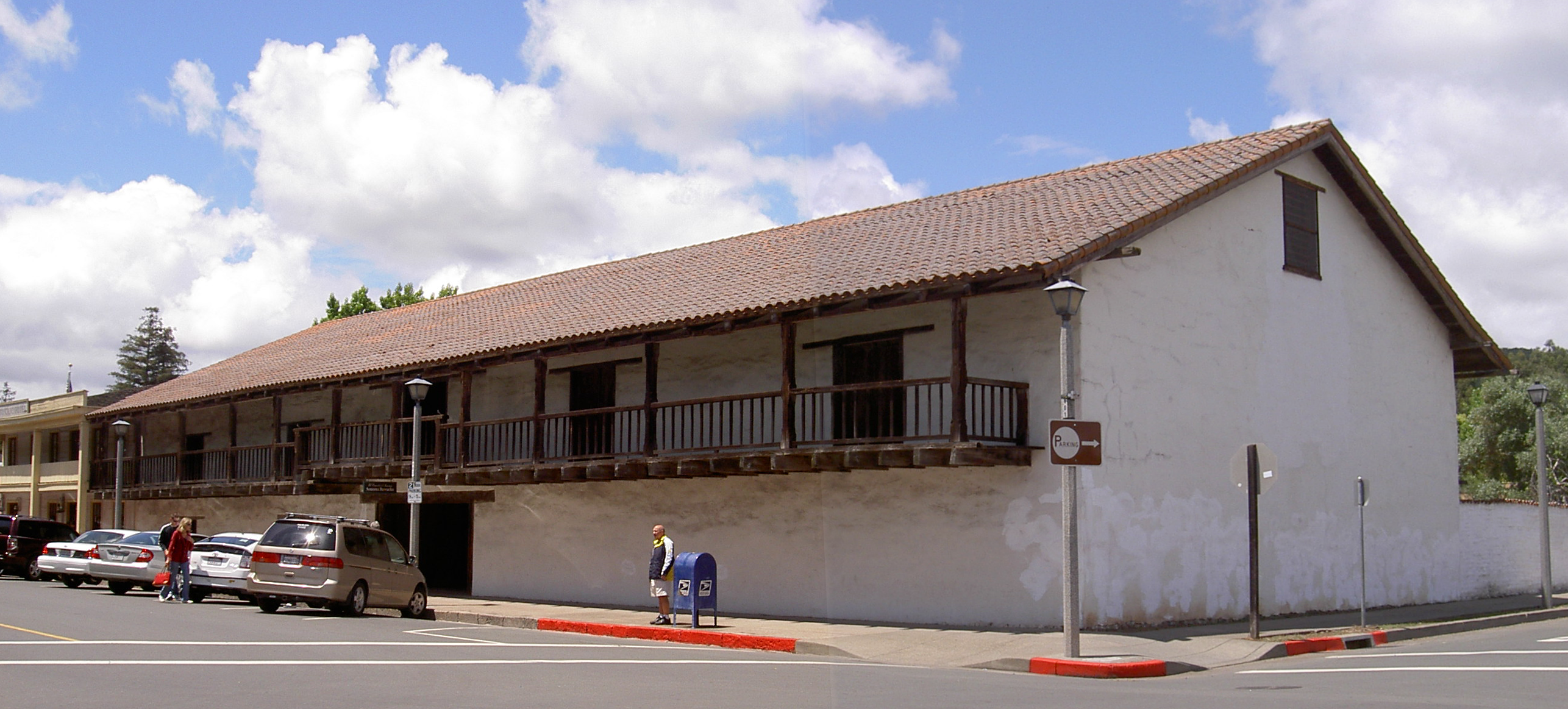
Sonoma Barracks

=== Sonoma Barracks (El Cuartel de Sonoma) ===
The Sonoma Barracks (El Cuartel de Sonoma) is a two-story, wide-balconied, adobe building facing the central plaza of the City of Sonoma, California. It was built by order of Lieutenant (Teniente) Mariano Guadalupe Vallejo to house the Mexican soldiers that had been transferred from the Presidio of San Francisco in 1835 as part of the secularization of the Mission. The Presidial Company and its commander, Lieutenant Vallejo, were also responsible for controlling the Native Americans living on the northern border of Mexican California.

On June 14, 1846, the Pueblo of Sonoma was taken over by a group of American immigrants seeking to establish their own California Republic. The Barracks became the headquarters for this short-lived insurrection that later became known as the Bear Flag Revolt.

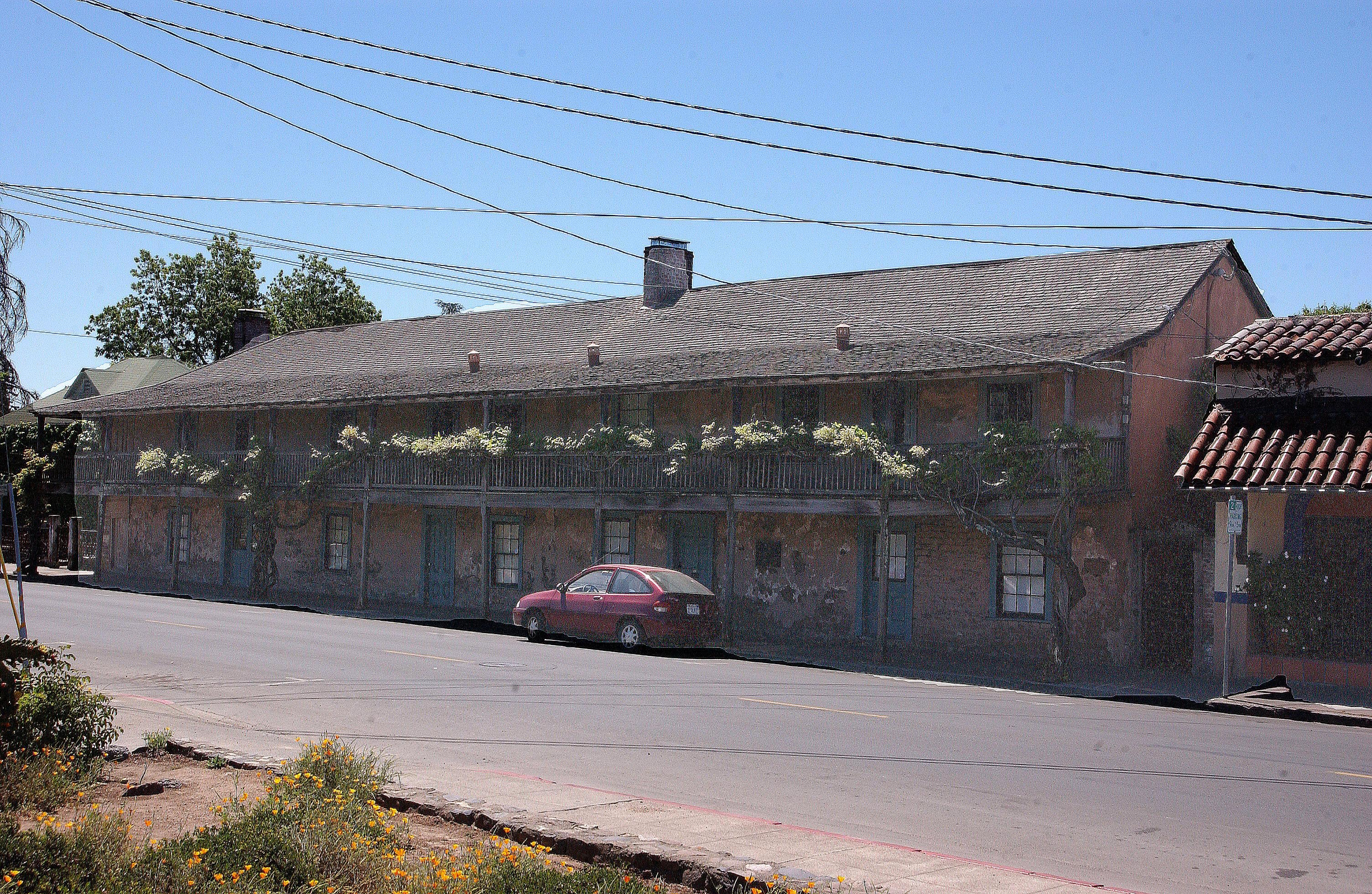
Blue Wing Inn

=== Blue Wing Inn ===
The Blue Wing Inn was one of the first hotels, reputedly the first hotel, in California north of San Francisco. The original building, constructed in 1836, was a simple one-story adobe home. However, in 1848 during the California Gold Rush it was purchased by seafarer James Cooper and ship's carpenter Thomas Spriggs, who together expanded the hotel to incorporate a saloon. They added an upper floor and expanded the ground floor from one room to three; further expansion in 1852 included balconies and two more rooms on the second floor. Up to that point, the hotel had been known as Sonoma House. It was Spriggs who named it the Blue Wing, in July 1853.

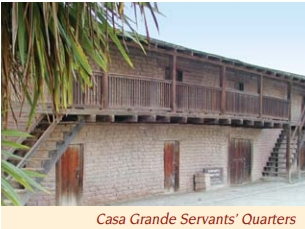
Casa Grande Servants' Quarters

=== La Casa Grande ===
La Casa Grande was the Vallejo family's first home. At the time one of the most imposing and well-furnished private residences in California. It stood with its wide second-story balcony overlooking the town's plaza. Although the house was not finished until 1840, there is reason to believe that a portion of it was completed in time for Vallejo's second daughter to be born there on January 3, 1837. In all, eleven Vallejo children were born in the house. Over the years La Casa Grande became the center of social and diplomatic life north of San Francisco Bay. About 1843, Mariano Vallejo added a three-story adobe tower to the southwestern corner of the house. From this vantage point it was possible to look out over several miles of the Sonoma Valley. An adobe wall connected the tower and Salvadore Vallejo's house to the west. Built in an L-shape, the rear section contained a kitchen and sleeping quarters for Vallejo's staff of Native Indian servants.

It was in La Casa Grande on the morning of June 14, 1846 that Vallejo, his brother Salvadore, and his brother-in-law Jacob Leese, were confronted by leaders of the Bear Flag Revolt, and following several hours of negotiations, were taken prisoner and sent to Sutter's Fort for detention.

Vallejo's family lived at La Casa Grande until 1852, when their new residence, Lachryma Montis, was completed. Vallejo, however, maintained an office at La Casa Grande, where in the 1860s he worked on his history of California. Vallejo also leased rooms to other residents and army officers. In 1853, a Dr. John Van Mehr established his boarding school, St. Mary's Hall for Young Ladies, in La Casa Grande, expanding into the Servants’ Quarters building the following year. Unfortunately, a diphtheria epidemic broke out in the late summer of 1856 killing four of Van Mehr's students and resulting in the permanent closure of the school in December.

The main wing of the house was destroyed by fire on February 12, 1867, leaving only the low two-story servants' wing which is still standing today.

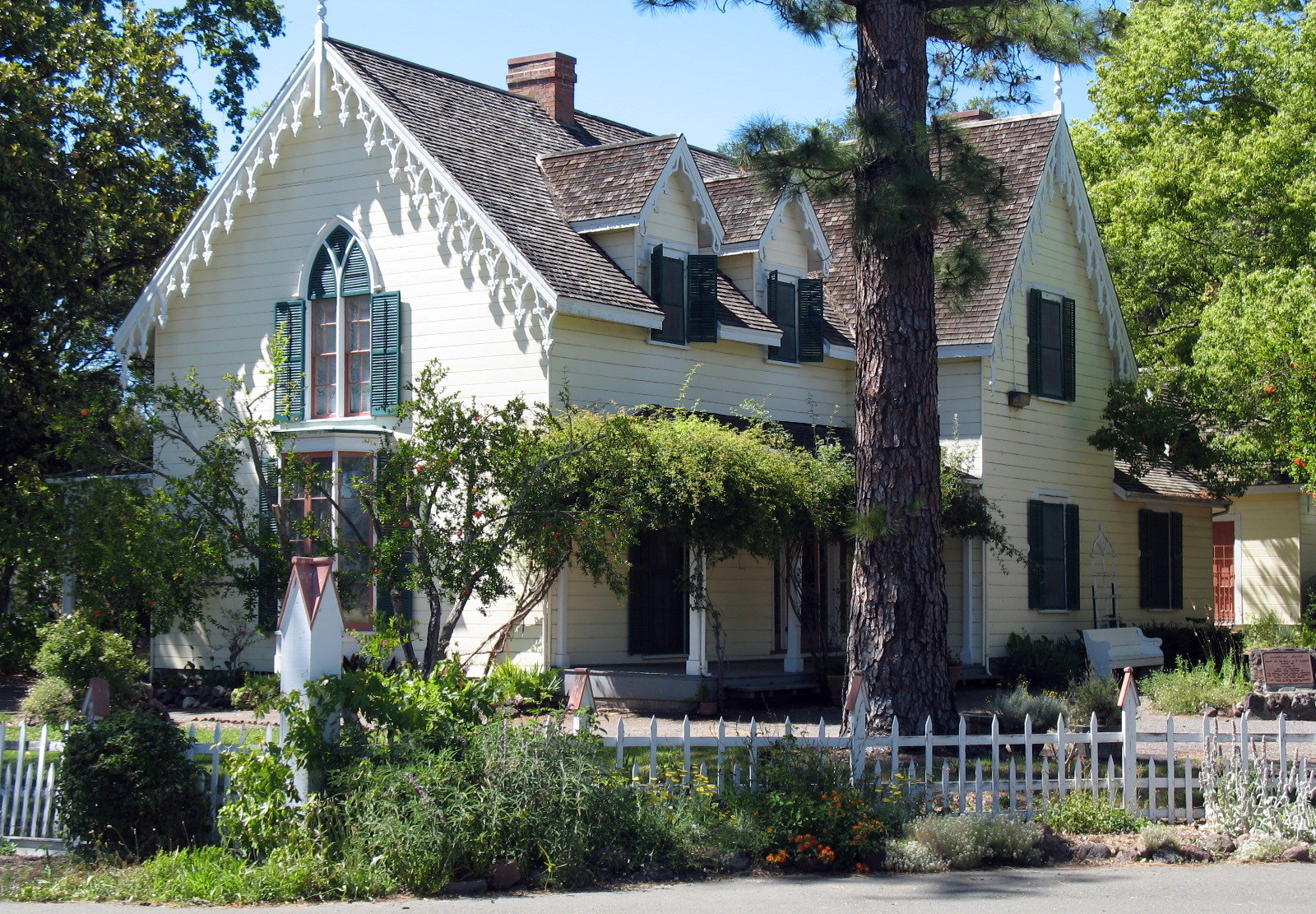
Vallejo Home

=== Lachryma Montis ===
Mariano Guadalupe Vallejo began purchasing acreage for the Vallejo Estate during November 1849. He named it Lachryma Montis (mountain tear) a rough Latin translation of Chiucuyem (crying mountain) - the Native American name for the free-flowing spring on the property. The estate was located at the foot of the hills half-a-mile west and north of Sonoma's central plaza. Vallejo determined to move his growing family from La Casa Grande after returning from Monterey and California's 1849 Constitutional Convention.

Vallejo's home was built beside the spring and its pool in 1851–1852. The two-story, wood-frame house was prefabricated, designed and built on the east coast of United States. It was shipped around Cape Horn on a sailing ship and then assembled at its present site. The design was Victorian Carpenter Gothic highlighted by a large Gothic window in the master bedroom, twin porches, dormer windows, and elaborate carved wooden trim along the eaves. Bricks were placed inside the walls of the house in order to keep it warm in winter and cool in summer. Each room had its own white marble fireplace. Crystal chandeliers, lace curtains, and many other furnishings including the handsome, rosewood, concert-grand piano, were imported from Europe.

The estate included pavilions and other outbuildings, a large barn and houses for the working staff. The Cook House was a three-room rectangular wooden building behind the main house. The cook lived in one room while the other two rooms were used for food preparation and cooking. El Delirio is a small wooden structure in the garden next to the main house It served as a retreat for the Vallejo family and guests. A special warehouse was erected in 1852 in order to store wine, fruit, and other produce. The original timbers were cut and numbered in Europe and shipped to California. Eventually the building was converted to residential use and became known as the "Swiss Chalet".

Grapevines were transplanted to the new site along with a wonderful assortment of fruit decorative trees and shrubs. The quarter-mile-long driveway lined with cottonwood trees and Castilian roses. A vine-covered arbor shaded a wide pathway around the pool into which the spring flowed, and a number of decorative fountains and delightful little outbuildings also graced the grounds.

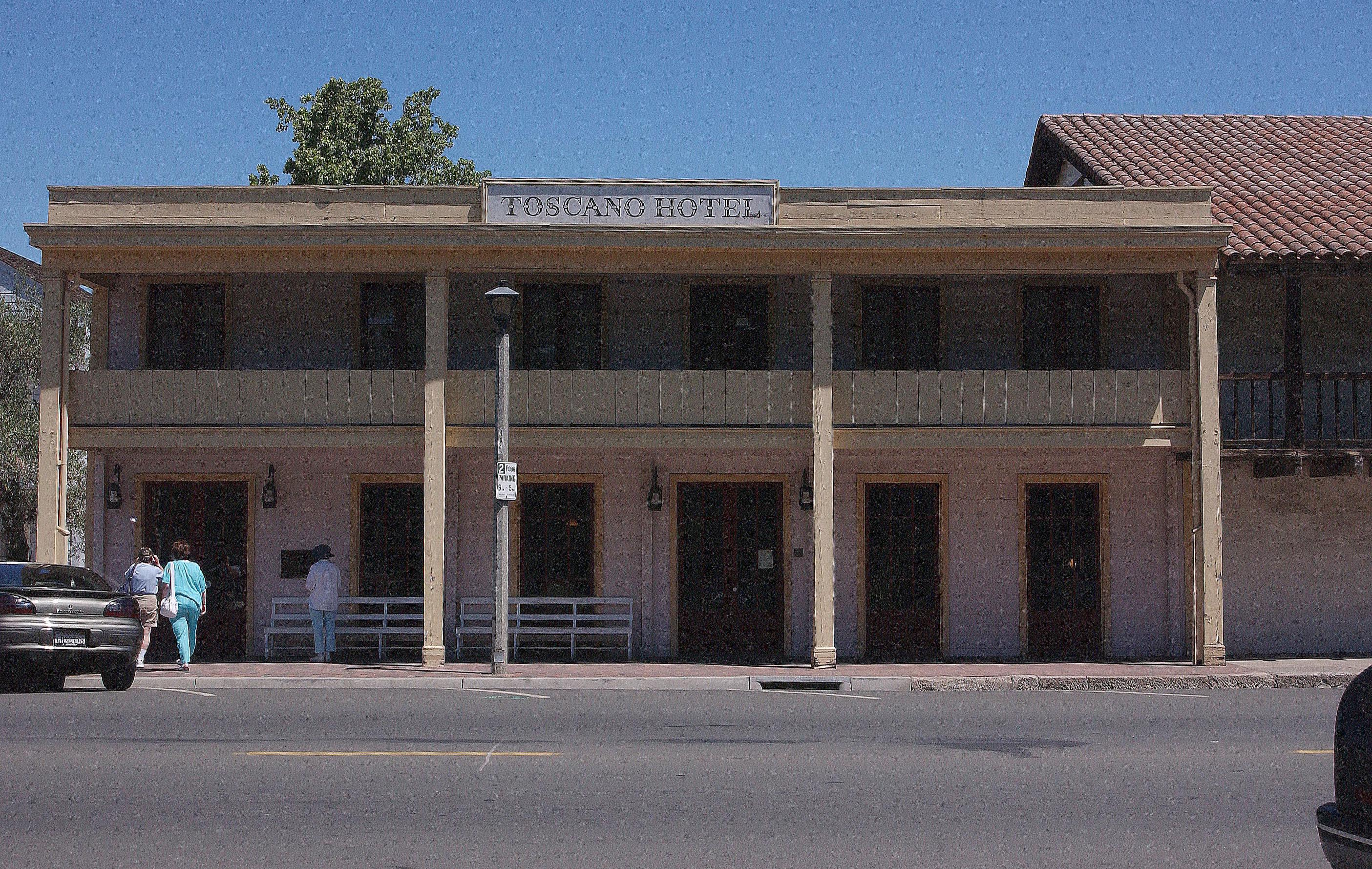
Toscano Hotel

=== Toscano Hotel ===
The land, between the Sonoma Barracks and La Casa Grande, that houses the Toscano Hotel complex was sold by Mariano Vallejo to Mrs. M.M. (Dorothea) Nathanson in 1852. Shortly after the purchase, Mrs. Nathanson constructed a two-story building with surplus lumber from the new Methodist church in Sonoma. The building was first used as a retail store and rental library called Nathanson's. In September 1859, Mrs. Nathanson sold the property to Henry Carl of San Francisco, who sold it to Christian Frederick Leiding the following March. Leiding's Store operated from 1860 to 1877.

Following a fire that destroyed the nearby Eureka Hotel in 1877, proprietor Frank McKeague leased the Leiding building as the location for the new Eureka Hotel. A notice for the hotel placed in the Index Tribune advertised that German was spoken and all employees were white (not Chinese). For fire safety reasons, a second stairway was added to the building, enclosed within an 11-foot extension to the building's west end. A new front façade and balcony were also constructed. Between 1880 and 1886 Leiding leased the building to other tenants including John and Maggie Phelan who ran it as a hotel and boarding house for laborers at Solomon Schocken's nearby quarries. Historical accounts indicate that, at least for a time, the Phelans ran it as a temperance hotel, advertising "no alcoholic beverages on the premises."

An 1886, directory lists the hotel's name as Tuscano - the proprietors as Settimo Ciucci and Leonido Quatoroli. In 1891, Ciucci is listed as the hotel's proprietor and the 1897 Sanborn Map indicates that the name of the hotel had changed to the Toscano. In November 1898, Stefano Martinoni, Settimo Ciucci's father-in-law, purchased the Toscano for $10.00 in gold coin. The site at this time held the hotel with two one-story rear additions, a small two-story dwelling (now called the Tank House) and a one-story dwelling at the front lot line (now the 2nd floor of the Hotel Annex). In 1902 Settimo Ciucci constructed the Kitchen Annex, which housed a kitchen, dining room, and additional boarding house accommodations upstairs.

The Ciucci's daughter, Amelia, married Jack Walton, a railroad worker, in 1914. When Settimo Ciucci died in 1922, she and her husband assumed proprietorship of the hotel, continuing its operation as a combined boarding house for quarry workers and a summer resort for families of modest income. A 1925 brochure for the Northwestern Pacific Railroad noted that the hotel was a block and a half away from the railroad depot and could accommodate seventy-five guests (this number may have been slightly inflated). The going rate at that time was $12 a week for adults. By the 1930s Jack Walton had gained wide renown for his welcoming hospitality and for his famous "Old Fashioned" cocktails. When he died in August 1955, Amelia closed the hotel, though she continued to live on the property. She sold it and related buildings to the State of California for $50,000 in 1957.

Today, the Toscano Hotel is furnished with period furniture and looks much the way it did around the turn of the century.

== Mariano Guadalupe Vallejo and the Historic Structures ==
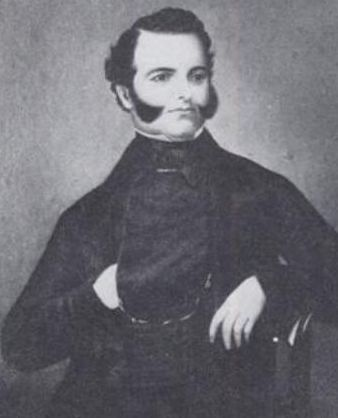
Mariano Vallejo as a Young Man

=== Background ===
Lieutenant (Teniente) Mariano Guadalupe Vallejo was comandante of the Company of the National Presidio at San Francisco (Compania de Presidio Nacional de San Francisco) in 1833, when newly appointed California Governor José Figueroa arrived with instructions from the national government to establish a strong garrison in the region north of the San Francisco Bay. An immediate concern was further eastward movement of the Russian America Company from their settlements on the California coast.

That same year the Mexican Congress decided to close all of the missions in Alta California. Mission San Francisco Solano officially ceased to exist on November 3, 1834, when it was designated a First Class Parish. Lieutenant Vallejo was named administrator (comisionado) to oversee the closing of the Mission under Figueroa's Reglamento. Vallejo had been instructed to establish a pueblo at the site of the old Mission and he began laying out Sonoma with its residential lots, central square and broad avenue to the south.

At this time Figueroa approved a land grant for the 66,622-acre (269.61 km^{2}) Rancho Petaluma for Vallejo. This rancho was to the west of new pueblo. Vallejo was also named Director of Colonization with the ability to initiate land grants (subject to confirmation by the Governor and the diputación {the territorial legislature}) for other Mexican citizens.

Vallejo was also named Military Commander of the Northern Frontier. He was responsible for guarding the northern border from incursion by foreigners and maintaining control over the Native population north of the Bay. Soldiers from the Presidio of San Francisco were moved to Sonoma. While the El Cuartel de Sonoma (barracks) was built to house troops, most of the space was used as a headquarters and for supply, equipment and weapons storage.[6] Until the building was habitable the troops were housed in the buildings of the old Mission.

=== Vallejo and the Historic Sites ===
Vallejo administered the secularization of Mission San Francisco Solano. Over the next several years he ordered the Sonoma Barracks and La Casa Grande to be built along the northern edge of the plaza. In 1841 he had the current chapel (located on the west side of the Mission) built for the local parish. This replaced the large, dilapidated Mission church on the east side. In 1851–52 he built Lachryma Montis as his new home several blocks northwest of the plaza.

Vallejo granted the first pueblo lot (#35) to Antonio Ortega, the majordomo he recruited to assist him in overseeing the secularization of the Mission (the one-room adobe at that location comprised the core of what was to become the Blue Wing Inn). The land for the Toscano Hotel was purchased from Vallejo in 1852. Vallejo had some involvement in all the historic structures that comprise Sonoma State Historic Park.

== See also ==
- California Department of Parks and Recreation
- List of California State Historic Parks
- List of California state parks
- Rancho Petaluma Adobe
- Swiss Hotel
