= Vallejo Estate =

Historic house in California, United States

- U.S. National Register of Historic Places
- California Historical Landmark
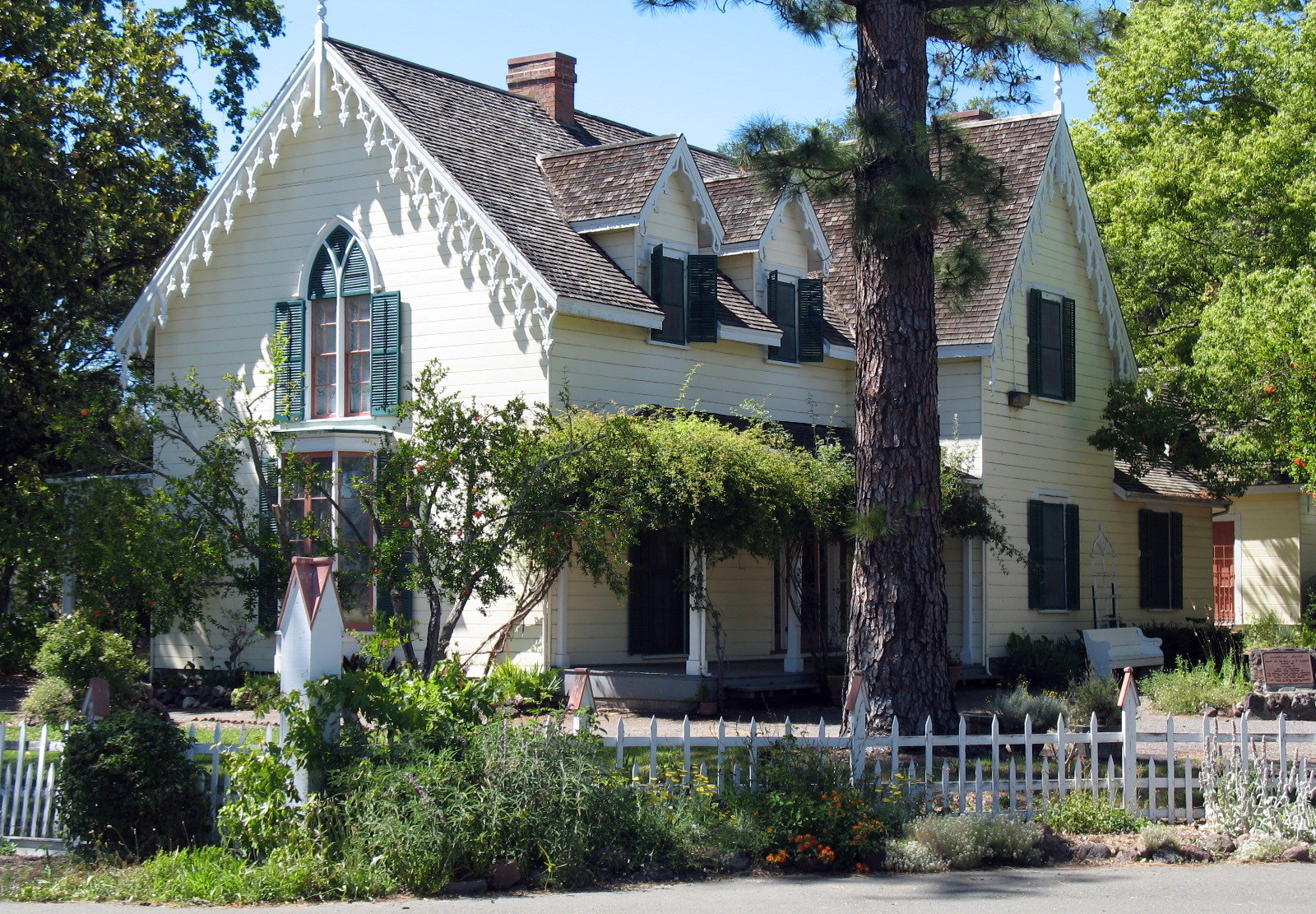

- Location within California Location within the United States
- Location: Corner of Spain and West 3rd Streets, Sonoma, California
- Coordinates: 38°17′50″N 122°27′40″W
- Built: 1851–1852
- Architectural style: Carpenter Gothic—Victorian
- NRHP reference No.: 72000262
- CHISL No.: 4

Significant dates
- Added to NRHP: June 29, 1972
- Designated CHISL: June 1, 1932

The Vallejo Estate is a historic house in Sonoma, California, one of the six sites that comprises the Sonoma State Historic Park. The estate was owned by General Mariano Guadalupe Vallejo, a Californio military leader and landowner. Vallejo began buying the acreage for the house after returning from the California constitutional convention in Monterey in 1849, and resided in the house from 1852 until his death in 1890. He named the house Lachryma Montis (mountain tear), a rough Latin translation of Chiucuyem (crying mountain) – the Native American name for the free-flowing spring on the property.

== Developing the estate ==
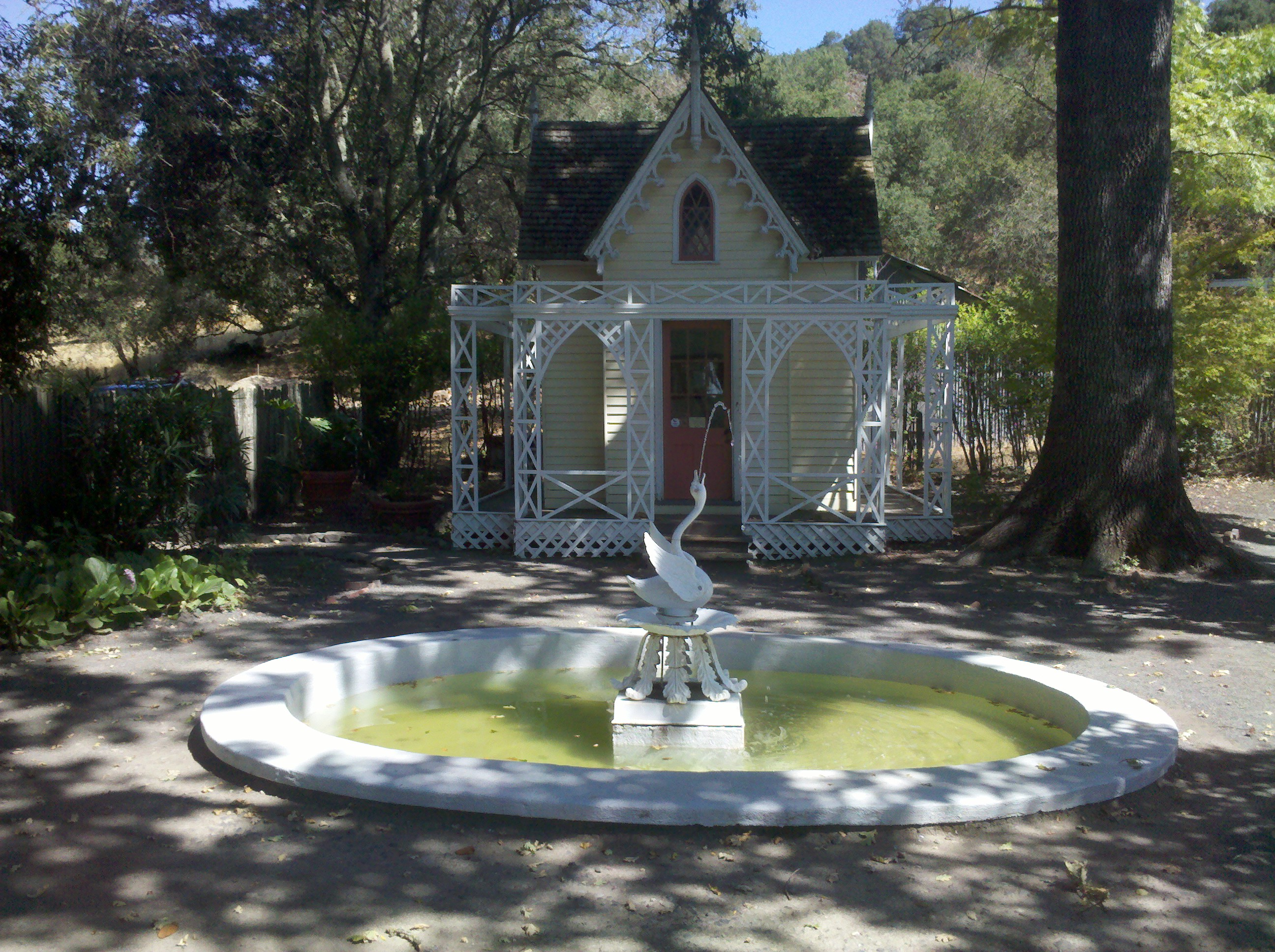
El Delirio, a small garden folly.

Vallejo's home was built beside the spring and its pool in 1851–1852. The two-story, wood-frame house was prefabricated, designed and built on the east coast of United States. It was shipped around Cape Horn on a sailing ship and then assembled at its present site. The design was Victorian Carpenter Gothic highlighted by a large Gothic window in the master bedroom, twin porches, dormer windows, and elaborate carved wooden trim along the eaves. Bricks were placed inside the walls of the house in order to keep it warm in winter and cool in summer. Insulation with adobe was a material which Vallejo felt had proven practical in California's climate. The furnishings were eclectic, representing Vallejo's Spanish and Mexican heritage, the China trade, and styles popular with Americans. Each room had its own white marble fireplace. Crystal chandeliers, lace curtains, and many other furnishings including the handsome, rosewood, concert-grand piano, were imported from Europe.

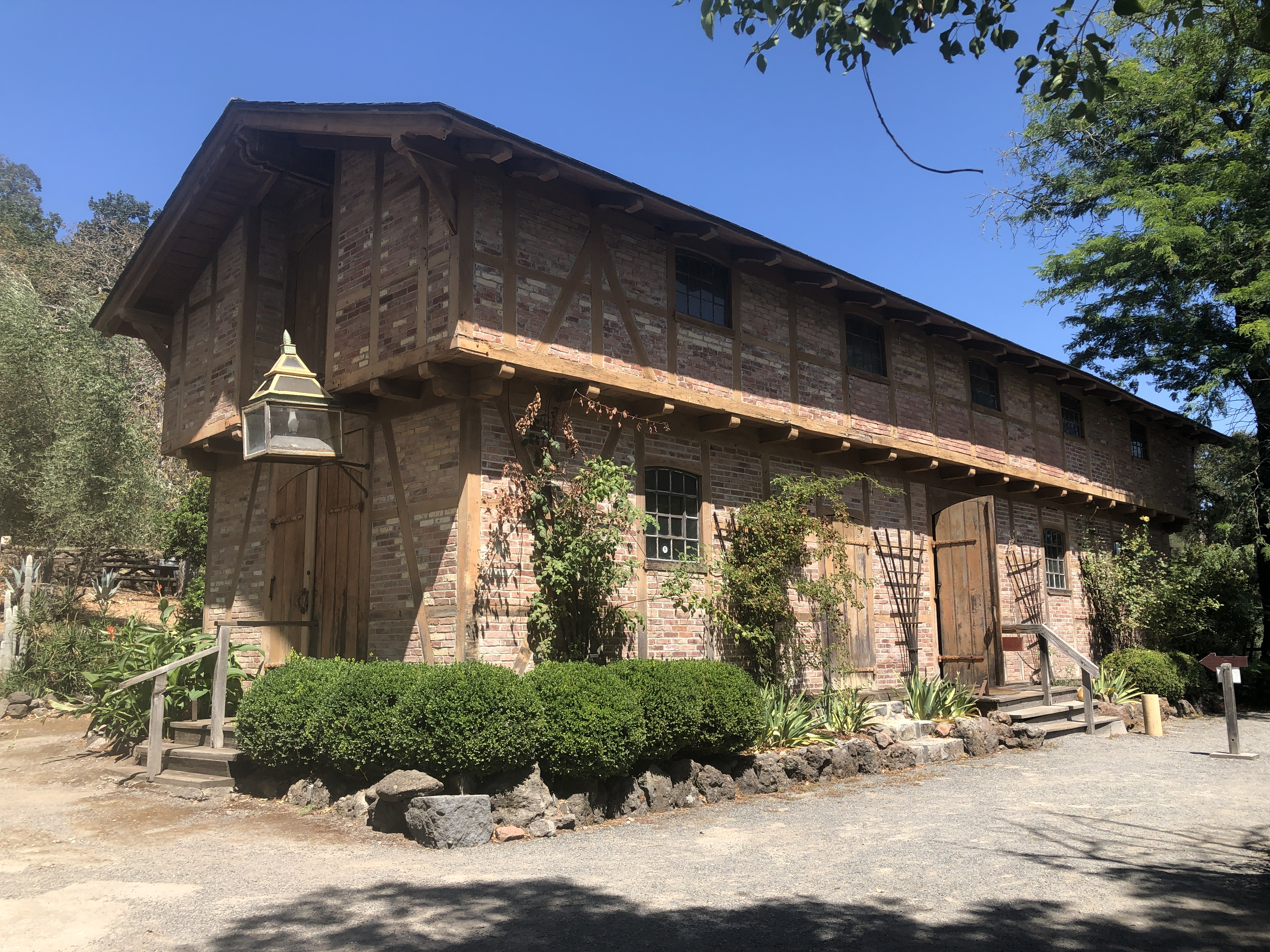
The chalet at Lachryma Montis.

The estate included pavilions and other outbuildings, a large barn and houses for the working staff. The Cook House was a three-room rectangular wooden building behind the main house. The cook lived in one room while the other two rooms were used for food preparation and cooking. El Delirio is a small wooden structure in the garden next to the main house It served as a retreat for the Vallejo family and guests. A special warehouse was erected in 1852, in another architectural style, in order to store wine, fruit, and other produce. The original timbers were cut and numbered in Europe and shipped to California. The bricks came around the Horn as ballast in sailing ships. Eventually the building was converted to residential use and became known as the "Swiss Chalet".

Grapevines were transplanted to the new site along with an assortment of fruit decorative trees and shrubs. The quarter-mile-long driveway was lined with cottonwood trees and Castilian roses. A vine-covered arbor shaded a wide pathway around the pool into which the spring flowed, and a number of decorative fountains and outbuildings were also on the grounds.

== Living at the estate ==
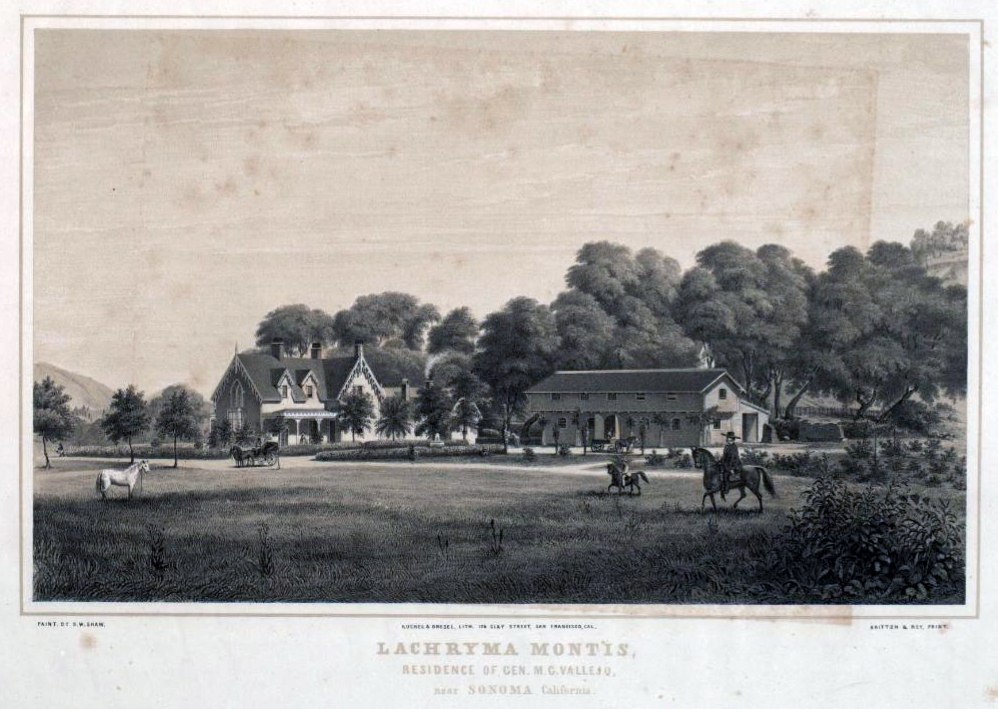
LachrymaMontis

Vallejo and family moved into Lachryma Montis in 1852. He and his wife lived there for more than 35 years. As Vallejo suffered one economic setback after another they were forced to live more and more quietly and unpretentiously. He eventually lost nearly all of his vast land holdings and was even forced to sell the vineyard and other "nonessential" acreage at the estate.

During the 1850s and 1860s Vallejo became a leader of California's fledgling wine industry. He established more vineyards and became one of the first commercial winemakers in the region. In the 1870s, the vine louse Phylloxera devastated his vineyards as well as Vallejo's hopes for wine production.

In 1873 he entered into an agreement with two partners to supply water from the pond to the citizens of Sonoma through redwood pipes. This secured some regular income. In 1881 he sold an easement to the Sonoma Valley Railroad bisecting his property.

== Later years ==
In 1933 the Vallejo home and some 20 acres of the original land was acquired by the State in order to protect and preserve this historic site and its collection of historic artifacts and documents. On June 29, 1972, it was added to the National Register of Historic Places. It is also California Historical Landmark Number 4 and is part of the Sonoma State Historic Park.

== Gallery ==
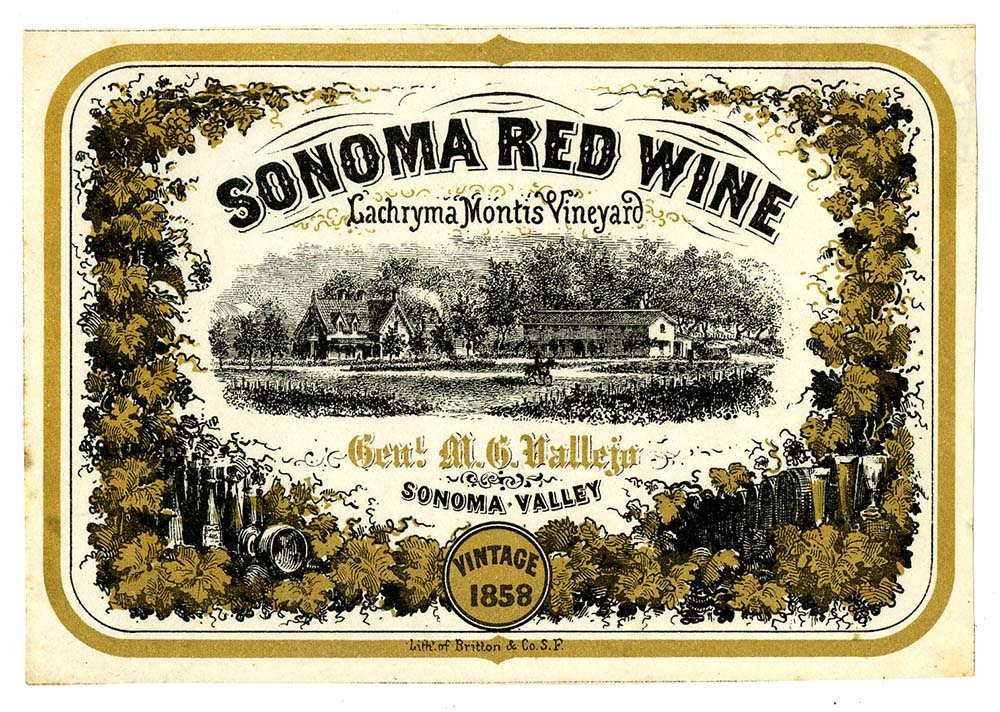
Wine label, Lachryma Montis Vineyard, Sonoma Red Wine 1858. California Historical Society archives.

== See also ==
- Mariano Guadalupe Vallejo
- Sonoma State Historic Park
- Rancho Petaluma Adobe
