= General Frisbie (steamship) =

Steamship, built 1900

Steamship General Frisbie
- General Frisbie ca. 1909

History
- Name: General Frisbie (1900–1931); Commander (1931–1950)
- Owner: Hatch Bros. Steamship Co.(1900-1905); Monticello Steamship Co.(1905-1929); Union Ferry Co.(1930-1935); Far North Packing Co.(1936-1950), and others
- Route: San Francisco Bay, Puget Sound, Alaska
- In service: 1900
- Out of service: 1939
- Fate: Engines removed and beached.

General characteristics
- Tonnage: 670 GRT
- Length: 184 feet (56 m)
- Beam: 29 feet (8.8 m)
- Draft: 12 feet (3.7 m)
- Propulsion: as built: four cylinder triple expansion steam engine; later 1930s: converted to diesel engine.
- Speed: 17 knots (20 mph; 31 km/h)
- Capacity: 450 passengers
- Crew: 24
- Notes: Official Number 86541

The steamship General Frisbie was a wooden two-deck passenger ship built in 1900, named after John B. Frisbie. She was designed for use as a ferry between Vallejo and San Francisco. The steamer was successful in that role and was the fastest ship on the route when she began service. Improved roads, bridges, and automobiles reduced demand for ferry service in the Bay Area, and newer ships were optimized for transporting cars, so General Frisbie was retired in the late 1920s.

In 1930 General Frisbie was sold and towed to Seattle. She was renamed Commander and operated as a ferry between Bremerton and Seattle beginning in 1931. Rather than the superior service with which she began her San Francisco service, in Seattle she was the cut-price competitor with limited capabilities, particularly for cars. She continued her runs until November 1935 when her owner was acquired in the midst of a strike by ferry workers. She was immediately retired from ferry service.

The ship was sold again and converted into a floating salmon cannery in 1936. In 1937 and 1938 she sailed to Moser Bay on Kodiak Island, Alaska in the spring, and returned with cases of canned salmon in the fall. In 1939 her engine and other fittings were removed at Seattle. She was towed back to Moser Bay and beached in 1940 to become part of the permanent land-based cannery facility. In 1950 she was dismantled completely.

== Ownership history ==
Captain Zephaniah Hatch, a steamboat captain with experience on Puget Sound and the Columbia River, began providing ferry service between San Francisco and Vallejo in 1895. His only ship Monticello, was faster than the competing vessels on the route, and so enjoyed commercial success. Zephaniah brought his brother Charles into the business, naming it Hatch Brothers Steamship Company. The company reinvested its profits, ordering the construction of its second ship, General Frisbie, in 1900.

Hatch brought in a third partner in 1904 in order to fund the purchase of a third vessel, Arrow, in 1905. The new partnership, which owned General Frisbie, was incorporated as the Monticello Steamship Company. As the 1920s drew to a close, Zephaniah's sons, who ran the company after their father's death in 1913, considered the strategic challenge of the automobile to the ferry business and decided to sell. In February 1929 Monticello Steamship Company, including General Frisbie, was sold to the Golden Gate Ferry Company for US$2 million.

The new owner had little use for the obsolescent ship and sold it in 1930 to the Union Ferry Company of Seattle, which leased it to the Washington Line. Both companies were headed by Captain William E. Mitchell and were affiliated with Kitsap County Transportation Company. The ship was renamed Commander by its new owners.

On November 13, 1935, the Puget Sound ferry unions struck, shutting down the Black Ball ships. The next day Puget Sound Navigation Company made a deal to acquire Kitsap County Transportation Company, which operated the Washington Line. Just as in San Francisco, the acquiring company had no use for the obsolescent Commander and quickly sold her. In February 1936, Commander was sold to C.L. Bryant, a Seattle salvage broker, who resold her to Richard D. "Dick" Suryan.

The Suryans of Anacortes, Washington were a Croatian immigrant family active in Northwest fisheries. Suryan, Inc, bought Commander in 1936 and converted it to a floating cannery. The company became insolvent and Commander was foreclosed on by Seattle First National Bank in 1938. The bank owned the ship through at least 1941. The Suryans regained ownership of the vessel by at least 1943 through their Far North Packing Company.

In 1946, Libby, McNeill & Libby, purchased the Far North Packing Company, including the beached Commander.

== Construction and modification ==
General Frisbie underway ca. 1911

=== Initial construction ===
General Frisbie was built in New Whatcom, now part of Bellingham, Washington, in 1900. Her builder is variously reported as G.R. Whidden or the Bellingham Bay Improvement Company. Bellingham Bay Improvement Company owned both a lumber mill and waterfront real estate in the area, so both parties may have been involved.

The hull was towed from New Whatcom to San Francisco by the steamer Rainier. On this delivery trip General Frisbie was laden with lumber for sale in San Francisco. After a placid trip down the Strait of Juan de Fuca, the ships were met by a sudden gale off Cape Flattery. After a two-day struggle with the storm, Rainier ran low on coal and returned to Seattle to refuel. She finally arrived in San Francisco on December 26, 1900 and General Frisbie began fitting out.

Her steam engine, boilers, and lighting plant were installed in San Francisco. She had a triple expansion steam engine which produced 1000 horsepower to drive a single propeller. The engine was manufactured by United Engine Works of San Francisco. Her boilers were built by Keystone Boiler Works. The boilers were oil-fired, which gave General Frisbie a speed advantage over her coal-fired competitors.

In her initial configuration she was licensed to carry 450 passengers. Among her amenities was a dining room that sat sixty. Her initial cost, after fitting out, was estimated at $80,000. At some point during her time in San Francisco Bay, she was modified to carry 12 cars, loading through a side door. This small capacity was not competitive with purpose-built car ferries of the day. By way of example, the Southern Pacific ferry Lake Tahoe, built in 1927, could transport 59 cars.

Her home port was San Francisco.

She was named for General John B. Frisbie, a founder of Vallejo, California and son-in-law of General Mariano Guadalupe Vallejo, a pivotal figure in the transition of California from Mexican to American rule.

=== Dimensions and machinery as built ===
General Frisbie was 183.8 feet long, with a beam of 29.3 feet and a depth of hold of 11.6 feet. The overall size of the vessel was 670 gross tons. The vessel was fitted with a four cylinder triple expansion steam engine with cylinder diameters of 16 in (40.6 cm), 25 in (63.5 cm), 30 in (76.2 cm) and 30 in (76.2 cm). The steamer was fitted with two return tube boilers which produced steam at 175 pounds working pressure. The overall power plant generated 1,000 horsepower.

=== Conversion to Puget Sound ferry ===
General Frisbie was towed to Seattle by the freighter Jane Nettleton, arriving February 15, 1930. Her new owners took bids for work on the pilot house, staterooms, companionways, and superstructure. At some point in her Seattle ferry career she had her boilers replaced. It is not clear whether this was part of the initial Seattle refit.

=== Conversion to floating cannery ===
Major modifications were made to Commander in 1936–37 to convert it from a ferry to a floating cannery. The conversion took place at the Seattle Shipbuilding and Drydock Company at the foot of 26th Avenue NW in Ballard. The original pilot house was removed and replaced with a much smaller structure. The upper deck was converted to accommodations for thirty workers while the lower deck was made into a fish processing plant and cannery. The old steam engine and boiler was replaced by a 4-cylinder "E" type Bolinder diesel engine. The large smokestack associated with the old steam engine was replaced by two much smaller funnels. A cargo crane was installed with the mast rising from the new pilot house and the boom swinging over the foredeck. A smaller crane was installed on the stem.

Approximately $75,000 was spent on the conversion.

Her home port was changed to Juneau, Alaska.

== Service history ==
General Frisbie (left) and Monticello at Vallejo Docks c. 1909

=== San Francisco ferry ===
General Frisbie's entrance into San Francisco operations was marked by an "owner's trial" excursion on June 12, 1901, which included a number of friends and invited guests of the Hatch Brothers. Her first captain was George Wheeler Jr., who had previously been master of Hatch's Monticello.

In normal operations, she and other Hatch steamers ran between pier 2 at the Mission Street Dock in San Francisco and her Vallejo terminal, near the Mare Island Naval Shipyard. Travel time varied with the state of the tides, but she would typically complete the trip in ninety minutes. Her initial schedule had her sailing from San Francisco at 9:45 am, and 3:15 and 8:30 pm. She returned from Vallejo at 7:00 am, and 12:30 and 6:00 pm. A round trip ticket cost $1, except on Sundays when it was $0.75. Meals cost $0.50.

The ship also ran excursions on holidays and for special events. For example, on July 4, 1923 she ran four-hour excursions around San Francisco Bay featuring dancing and refreshments for $1.50 per passenger.

==== Groundings and collisions ====
When General Frisbie began service in 1901 there were no electronic navigation aids, not even radios; the limit of maritime communications technology at the time was signal flags. The U.S. Coast Guard assigned General Frisbie "KQMH", but a flag hoist is only useful if it can be seen. The thick fogs in San Francisco Bay meant that groundings and collisions were frequent in the local ferry fleet. General Frisbie had its share of accidents.

===== Ramming of St Helena (1903) =====
At 10:30 pm on October 19, 1903 General Frisbie was heading up the channel toward Vallejo while the steamer St Helena was sailing in the opposite direction for San Francisco. The two ships collided near Vallejo, with the bow of General Frisbie piercing the hull of St Helena. While General Frisbie was not critically damaged, St Helena promptly took on water and began to sink. Her captain drove her on to the mud flats at the edge of the channel where the ship settled onto the bottom. Her passengers were safely evacuated to shore while General Frisbie stood by to render assistance.

===== Collision with Iroquois (1912) =====
In a dense fog on October 3, 1912 General Frisbie, captained by Fred Olsen, hit the Southern Pacific freight steamer Iroquois. The collision carried away a portion of Iroquois' guard rail. General Frisbie sustained no damage in the mishap and was able to continue her run to San Francisco, but her passengers were "badly frightened". Iroquois was damaged badly enough that she was tied up at Mare Island.

===== Grounding on Anita Rock (1915) =====
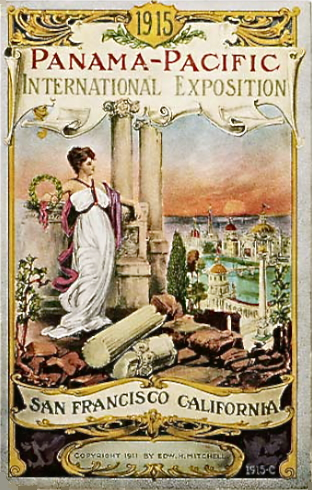
Poster for the Panama–Pacific International Exposition

The Panama-Pacific International Exposition was a big event in 1915 San Francisco. The Exposition grounds, in what is now the Marina District, had its own pier. On March 29, 1915 General Frisbie ran an excursion trip to this pier from Vallejo for Exposition dedication ceremonies. The number of passengers on board was variously reported at the time from 175 to 300, but all accounts agree that there were at least 45 children from the Good Temple Orphans Home in Vallejo.

The trip from Vallejo to the Exposition was uneventful. The passengers reembarked at 9:00 pm after their day at the Exposition. Captain Potwin decided to cruise along the shore to offer a final view of the Exposition's lights. The ship hit Anita Rock, just offshore from the Idaho Pavilion, at approximately 10 pm. The ship initially listed but then largely righted herself. She was hard aground, unable to move, with the hull pierced and water flooding in. The passengers, particularly the children, had to be calmed by the crew to prevent panic.

Captain Potwin used his steam whistle to signal the ship's distress. The nearby battleship USS Oregon responded by sending two steam launches. The lifesaving crews at Fort Point and Point Bonita also sent boats. All the passengers were rescued safely and taken back to the Exposition grounds. The rescue was aided by calm seas and searchlights trained on the scene from shore.

The crew kept the ship's pumps running all night, just keeping up with the incoming water. At 9:30 am on March 30, Crowley launch No. 1 and another vessel pulled General Frisbie off Anita Rock and into deeper water. Here a tug towed her to the Union Iron Works shipyard. Once in drydock, inspection of the hull revealed that 75 feet or roughly half of the keel had been torn off, as well as adjoining planking.

The subsequent investigation of the accident focused on the Anita Rock buoy. General Frisbie was the third vessel in a month to hit Anita Rock. All three captains believed that the buoy had been moved 200 yards inshore without notice to the maritime community.

===== Sinking of Sehome (1918) =====
The fog was thick in San Pablo Bay on the morning of December 14, 1918. General Frisbie had just left Vallejo while the steamer Sehome was headed up the channel in the opposite direction. Both ships were proceeding slowly and using their steam whistles as fog signals. Nonetheless, at 8:30 am General Frisbie rammed Sehome amidships on her port side.

Both captains immediately assessed the damage as fatal to Sehome and acted accordingly. Captain Charles Sandhal of General Frisbie left his engines in gear so that the bow of his ship would continue to plug the hole in Sehome's side and delay the inevitable sinking. Captain Fred Olsen of Sehome ordered all his passengers evacuated to General Frisbie.

It so happened that a party of sailors from Mare Island Naval Shipyard was on board General Frisbie heading to a football game in Berkeley. The Navy men assisted in the rescue of Sehome's passengers and were subsequently commended by the Secretary of the Navy for their efforts. Not only did they hand out life belts, but the Marine band struck up some ragtime tunes to calm the passengers.

The ships remained locked together for fifteen minutes. After all 173 passengers and crew were rescued from Sehome, a tug towing a rock barge emerged from the fog and collided with General Frisbie's stern. This blow wrenched her bow from the gash in the hull of Sehome, which promptly sank and came to rest on the mud bottom, awash to her upper deck.

Ironically, Fred Olsen, captain of the sunken Sehome, had been captain of General Frisbie when it collided with Iroquois in 1912.

=== Puget Sound ferry ===
In 1930 ferry traffic across Puget Sound was dominated by the Puget Sound Navigation Company, also known as the "Black Ball Line". General Frisbie was brought to Seattle by Kitsap County Transportation Company to challenge Black Ball on the Seattle–Bremerton run, where Black Ball was the only operator. She was renamed Commander by her new owners. The fact that she had limited capacity to carry cars was less important on this route since hundreds of workers from Seattle commuted to the Puget Sound Naval Shipyard in Bremerton every day for work. The ferry dock in Bremerton is within walking distance of the naval shipyard, so the workers did not need car service.

Commander's owners announced a round-trip price between Seattle and Bremerton of $0.60, undercutting Black Ball's $0.80 rate. The newspapers portrayed this as a "rate war" with "battle lines drawn". The board of Puget Sound Navigation Company, which ran the Black Ball Line, chose not to match the lower rate. Instead, it intervened with the Washington Department of Public Works, which regulated ferry service, in April 1930 to prevent Commander from operating. The case was fought up to the Washington Supreme Court which ruled in favor of the challengers on April 2, 1931.

Commander began her daily runs after the Supreme Court victory. She sailed from the Canadian National dock at the foot of Marion Street in downtown Seattle. She was scheduled to leave Seattle at 6:00 and 9:30 am and 1:00, 5:00, and 8:00 pm. She returned from Bremerton at 8:00 and 11:45 am and 3:15, 6:30, and 10:15 pm. A round trip ticket cost $0.60.

The Black Ball Line added the ferry Kalakala to the Seattle – Bremerton route on July 2, 1935, competing with Commander. In November of that year, the unions struck the Black Ball Line but allowed Commander to continue service. This had the effect of allowing Puget Sound Naval Shipyard employees to get to work, while cutting off car ferry service to Bremerton, which only the Black Ball ships provided. Puget Sound Navigation Company responded to the unions' actions by acquiring its competitor's operations, including Commander. After an agreement with the ferry unions, Commander was retired in favor of Kalakala and towed to moorings in Kirkland on Lake Washington to await her fate.

=== Alaska cannery ===
The newly reconfigured Commander sailed north to Alaska on May 25, 1937. She returned to Puget Sound in the fall with 22,451 cases of canned salmon, which sold for $101,025.33. This amount was not sufficient to pay off the company's debts, so further financing was required. In spring 1938, Commander sailed again to Alaska to pursue her cannery operations. She returned to Anacortes in the fall with $106,353.22 worth of canned salmon, which again was insufficient to pay the company's debts. Suryan's, Inc. which owned the business was so short of cash that its pay-off checks to the crew of Commander at the end of the season bounced. The crew and some of the fishermen who sold their catch to the cannery blockaded the ship, forcing creditors to pay them before the canned salmon could be removed and sold.

== Disposition ==
Although it seems likely that Commander missed the 1939 fishing season after she was repossessed by Seattle First National Bank, by 1940 she was tied to the cannery dock again in Moser Bay. Having had her engines removed in 1939, it is likely that she spent the remainder of her career there as part of the cannery operations until she was broken up in 1950. Another source reports that the diesel engine and fittings were removed from Commander in 1939 and the hull was towed to Kodiak, Alaska, where it was beached.
