= Rancho Petaluma Adobe =

Historic house in California, United States

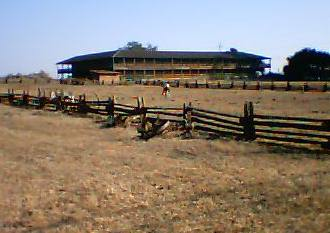
- Rancho Petaluma Adobe, California

General information
- Location: east of Petaluma, California, United States
- Coordinates: 38.25547°N 122.58451°W
- Construction started: 1834
- Completed: 1857
- Cost: $80,000
- Client: Mariano Guadalupe Vallejo

Technical details
- Structural system: adobe brick and timber
- Size: 200 x 145 feet (44.2 m)
- Petaluma Adobe
- U.S. National Register of Historic Places
- U.S. National Historic Landmark
- California Historical Landmark
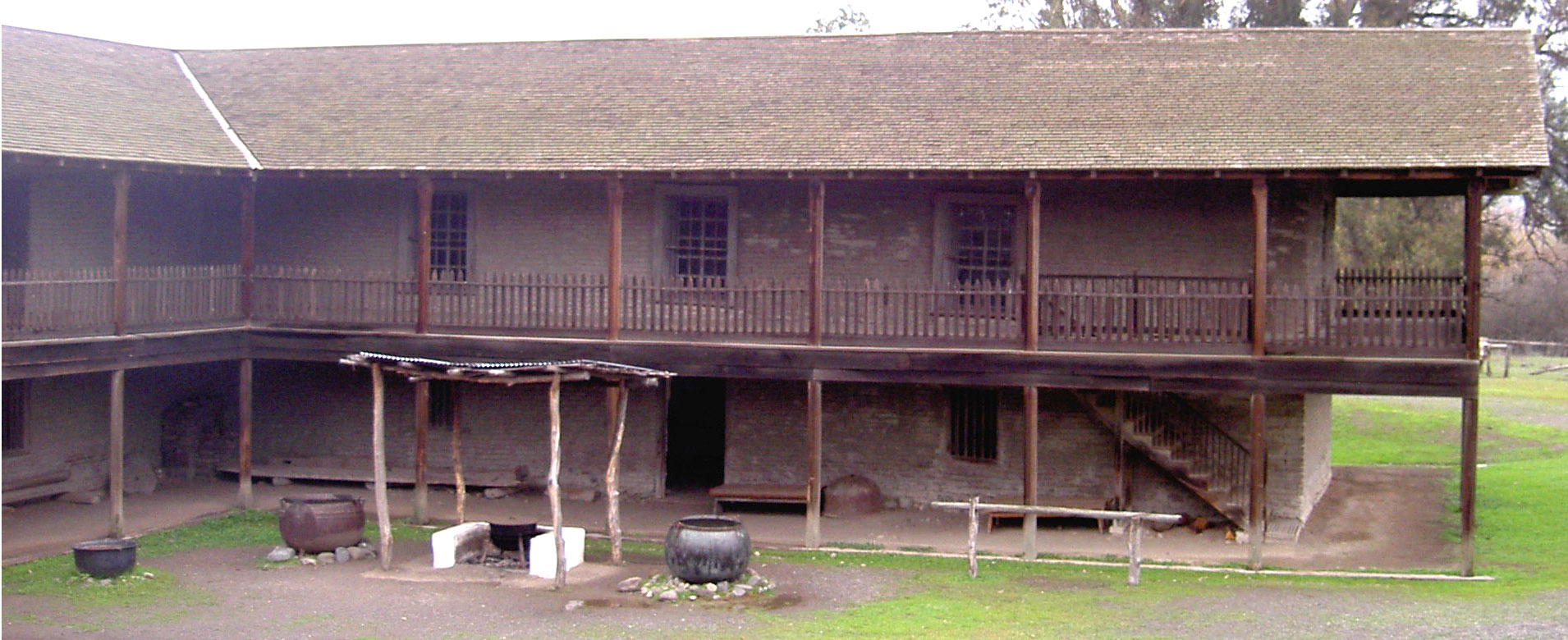

- Location within California Location within the United States
- Location: Casa Grande Road, Petaluma, California
- Area: 5 acres (2.0 ha)
- Built: 1836
- Architectural style: Adobe/Monterey Colonial
- NRHP reference No.: 70000151
- CHISL No.: 18

Significant dates
- Added to NRHP: April 15, 1970
- Designated NHL: April 15, 1970
- Designated CHISL: June 1, 1932

Rancho Petaluma Adobe is a historic ranch house in Sonoma County, California. It was built from adobe bricks in 1836 by order of Mariano Guadalupe Vallejo. It was the largest privately owned adobe structure built in California and is the largest example of the Monterey Colonial style of architecture in the United States. A section of the former ranch has been preserved by the Petaluma Adobe State Historic Park and it is both a California Historic Landmark and a National Historic Landmark. The Rancho Petaluma Adobe State Historic Park is located on Adobe Road on the east side of the present-day town of Petaluma, California.

== Description ==
The Adobe was designed to function both as a headquarters of a working ranch and as a defensive structure against attack by the Russians then living on the California coast or by the borderland's native tribes. It consisted of two, two-story buildings surrounding an open courtyard of roughly 200 ft × 145 ft (61 m × 44 m). It was built using adobe bricks and hand-hewn redwood timbers and planks. The building had planked floors and a low-sloped shingled roof. The wide, covered second-story veranda encased and protected the adobe walls from the weather and provided advantageous firing positions in case of an attack. There were large gates located between the buildings on the south and north sides of the quadrangle.

The southwest section of the building contained the Vallejo family living area, for when they visited the ranch. Some walls were plastered and whitewashed. The outdoor kitchen and the dining room (featuring imported glass windows) were on the ground floor. The second floor of the "fort" (as it was called by Vallejo) housed the family's sleeping rooms, Vallejo's office, the sleeping room for the ranch manager, guest rooms, and communal sleeping areas for the most privileged workers. The downstairs dining room and the rooms of the family and manager had interior fireplaces.

Construction of the eastern building was never fully completed. The walls were built but neither floors nor a roof were completed. That building no longer exists, so what remains of the Petaluma Adobe is only half its former size.

== History ==
=== Mexican-American era ===
In 1834, California Governor José Figueroa ordered Lieutenant (Teniente) Vallejo and his soldiers from the Presidio of San Francisco to move north of the Bay. He granted Vallejo the initial lands of Rancho Petaluma. During 1836 Vallejo began construction of the ranch house, eventually investing an estimated $80,000 in labor and materials. The planned structure was never fully completed. His younger brother Salvador Vallejo directed most of the construction. Between 1836 and 1839, at least 2,000 Native Americans were employed at the ranch to make bricks, haul lumber, build buildings, cook, farm, make tools, tan hides and tend the large herd of cattle.

Vallejo's family sometimes used the Petaluma Adobe as a summer home and for entertaining guests. They lived in the neighboring town of Sonoma. Vallejo's Sonoma home, known as Lachryma Montis, is now part of Sonoma State Historic Park.

Vallejo left daily management to his mayordomo (foreman), Miguel Alvarado, who resided at the ranch. In its operational days between 1836 and 1857, the Rancho Petaluma employed up to 2,000 Native Americans. The rancho became one of the largest ranches north of the San Francisco Bay and a social-economic center of Northern California.

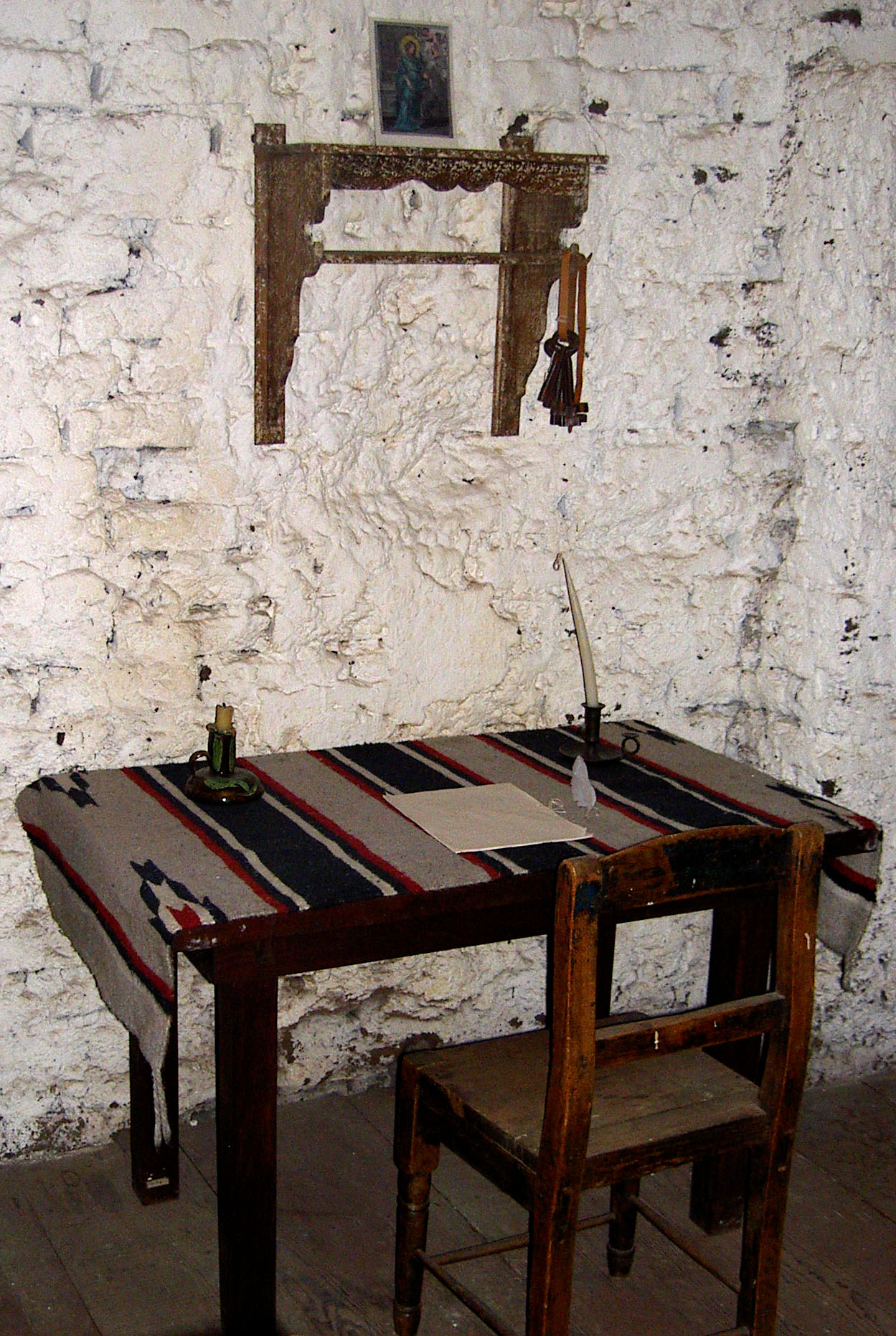
Desk in the mayordomo's room at Petaluma Adobe

The ranch also included a tannery, smithy, and a grist mill powered by Adobe Creek. It had over 12,000 head of cattle with about one quarter slaughtered each year. The cattle provided the ranch's main products - hides and tallow which were sent via river boats on the Petaluma River to the San Francisco Bay. The hides and tallow was the ranch's main income source while much of the meat was wasted. Vallejo made an estimated $18,000 to $24,000 yearly on hides and tallow ($697,000 to $929,000 in 2025 dollars). The ranch also had herds of up to 3,000 sheep that were used primarily for wool. Products such as candles, soap, thousands of wool blankets, boots and shoes for military troops under Vallejo's command, and saddles were manufactured by native artisans in ranch shops.

In 1843, Mexican Governor Manuel Micheltorena granted Vallejo the 84,000 acres (340 km^{2}) Rancho Suscol. The new grant extended the lands of Rancho Petaluma south down to the San Francisco Bay, and southeast past the present-day city of Vallejo. The U.S. Supreme Court rejected Vallejo's land claim for Rancho Suscol in 1862.

=== Native American workers ===
Low-cost and plentiful labor was the key to financial success for Rancho Petaluma. Native American workers were generally paid with food, clothing and other goods.

The most valuable Indian workers were the mission-trained ex-neophytes. Vallejo was particularly successful at attracting these workers from the secularized missions at Sonoma and San Rafael. They had the necessary skills and trades required for running the Rancho and its workshops and manufacturing. They constituted most of the year-around workforce. The most privileged workers were housed in rooms on the second floor of the Adobe. There was a historic-era Indian ranchería along the east side of Adobe Creek where the other year-around workers lived in tule reed huts.

Other unskilled Indians, who the Californios called gentiles, worked on a seasonal basis for the grain harvest, the cattle slaughter (la matanza) or things such as adobe brick making. Some of these individuals or families may have attached themselves to the Rancho voluntarily for a period of time. They may also have been sent to the Rancho by one of Vallejo's allies such as Chief Marin or Chief Solano. Rancho Petaluma also had some Native Americans who were not working voluntarily. They may have been captured by the military and were being punished for stealing or raids.

=== Decline of 1846–1910 ===
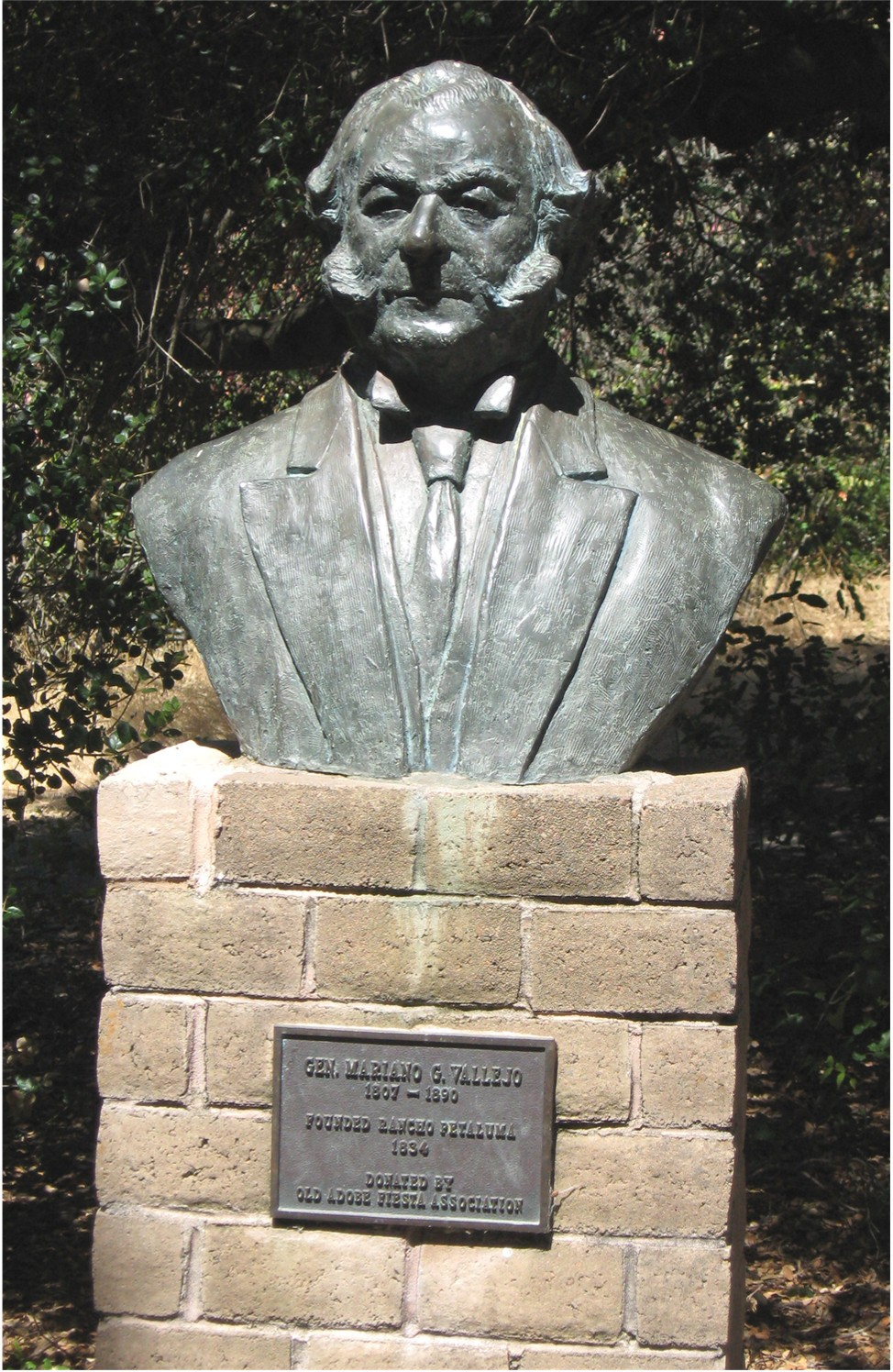
The Bust of General Mariano G. Vallejo, erected in 1975.

The fate of the ranch turned in 1846–48 when the United States and Mexico went to war: Lieutenant Colonel Vallejo was imprisoned for his position in the Mexican military, and in his absence, John C. Frémont requisitioned and stripped the ranch of its horses, cattle and grain reserves for the California Battalion. Many of the natives, his main labor force, fled from the soldiers. Thereafter the ranch declined in value and profitability every year.

In 1851 Vallejo submitted a claim to the United States for the animals and materials requisitioned by Fremont, et al.. His claim was reduced by a Board of Officers appointed by the Congress to examine the claims and Vallejo was paid $48,700 in 1855.

The University of California considered purchasing it for a campus site in 1856. Vallejo sold the building and 1,600 acres (6.5 km^{2}) to William Whiteside for $25,000 circa 1857 who sold it to William Bliss. The southeast half of the adobe deteriorated and the Bliss family could not afford all the repairs.

=== Conversion to a historic park ===
In 1910, Native Sons of the Golden West, Petaluma Parlor #27 purchased what remained of General Mariano G. Vallejo's vast adobe ranch house. Over half of the building had succumbed to neglect and the forces of nature. In 1932 it was registered as California State Historical Landmark #18. After years of work and fundraising, the fully restored historic site was turned over to the State of California in 1951. In 1970, it was registered as a National Historic Landmark.

It is preserved as the centerpiece of Petaluma Adobe State Historic Park. About 80% of the adobe brick is original, although most of the wood has been replaced. A part of the foundation for the deteriorated half is visible, and a small museum and other exhibits are on display.

Locals refer to it as "Old Adobe."

== See also ==
- Alta California
- Californios
- Bear Flag Revolt
