= John B. Frisbie =

American politician

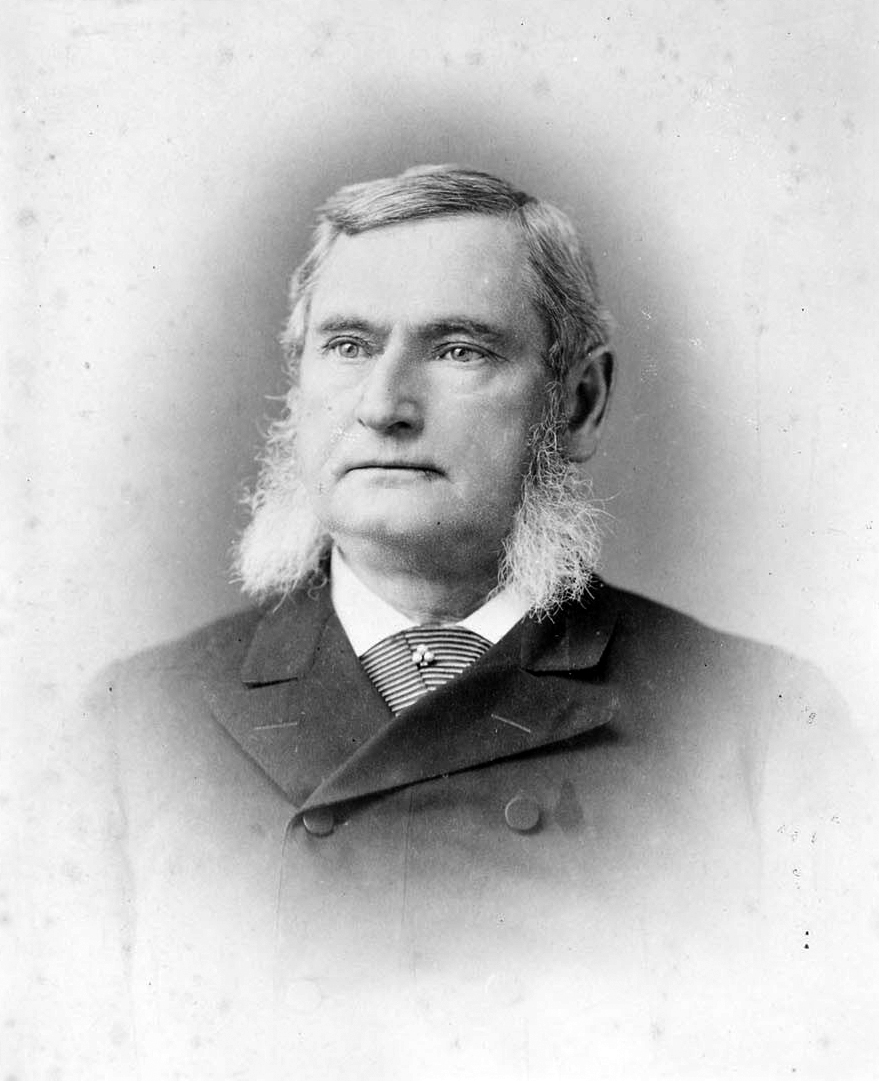
- Born: John Blackman Frisbie; May 20, 1823; Albany, New York, U.S.
- Died: May 11, 1909 (aged 85); Cuauhtémoc, Mexico City, Mexico
- Other name: Juan B. Frisbie
- Occupations: Businessman; Military officer; Lawyer; Politician
- Known for: Founder of Vallejo, California
- Spouse: Epifania de Guadalupe Vallejo (m. 1851)
- Children: 8

John Blackman Frisbie (May 20, 1823 – May 11, 1909), known in Spanish as Juan B. Frisbie, was an American lawyer, military officer, politician and businessman, who migrated from New York to California as a young man, married into the prominent Vallejo family, and became deeply involved in Mexico–United States relations. He briefly served in the California legislature and during the Mexican–American War he served in the U.S. Army. He was a founder of the California cities of Vallejo and Benicia, which were respectively named after his father-in-law Mariano Guadalupe Vallejo and his mother-in-law Francisca Benicia Carrillo. After his first career in California failed, he used his familiarity and connections with Mexico to begin a second successful career in that country.

== Biography ==
Frisbie was the son of Irish Catholic parents. He was born on May 20, 1823, in Albany, New York, was educated at The Albany Academy, and then along with Leland Stanford read law with a local Albany lawyer. He was admitted to the bar in New York at age 21. He practiced law in Buffalo, and upon the outbreak of the Mexican–American War traveled to California as an army captain. He sailed with his unit from New York in September 1846, went all the way around Cape Horn, and arrived six months later in San Francisco in early 1847. After the war, he remained in California, and became a merchant in Sonoma County, California. He ran for Lieutenant Governor of California in 1849, but was defeated by John McDougal.

On April 3, 1851, he married Epifania de Guadalupe Vallejo, the daughter of Mariano Guadalupe Vallejo. Among the guests present was Joseph Hooker. Before that, in 1850, General Vallejo had already granted Frisbie power of attorney over his claim to Rancho Suscol, and it was in this role that Frisbie ended up founding and developing the cities of Vallejo and Benicia. Unfortunately, Rancho Suscol was promptly overwhelmed with squatters during the California Gold Rush, and Frisbie spent an enormous amount of time from 1850 to 1865 attempting to eject unwanted squatters and defending his father-in-law's claim to the vast rancho before the Land Commission, various courts, and the United States Congress. Meanwhile, Frisbie became a successful businessman with investments in a livery stable, docks, wharves, schooners, water companies, a telegraph company, an insurance agency, a railroad company, a stagecoach line, a grain elevator, a bank, a coal mining company, a mine, a gas lighting company, a tanning company, a shoe manufacturer, and a ranch.

In 1861, the government of California formed several military units to secure control over the state for the Union at the start of the American Civil War. (Before World War I, the United States did not consistently maintain a large Regular Army, meaning that volunteer units were hastily formed in response to specific emergencies.) In September 1861, Frisbie was appointed the first captain of the Vallejo Rifles. In 1862, Governor Leland Stanford bestowed the title of General upon Frisbie.

Frisbie became the vice president of California Pacific Railroad in 1869. He held 18,000 shares in the railroad, which was intended to be the center of a "grand scheme" to build a network of railroads along the West Coast of the United States. The collapse of this scheme led to the September 26, 1876 closure and liquidation of the Vallejo Savings and Commercial Bank, which wiped out Frisbie's fortune.

Finding himself penniless at age fifty-four, Frisbie borrowed some money to reestablish himself elsewhere, then rebooted his business career and rebuilt his fortune by leveraging his familiarity with Mexican culture to play freelance diplomat. In 1877, he traveled to Mexico City, which became his residence for the next thirty-two years. He was armed with letters of introduction from Manuel Zamacona and Matías Romero. With the unofficial approval of U.S. Secretary of State William M. Evarts, Frisbie's original mission was to persuade Mexican President Porfirio Díaz to agree to sell a portion of northern Mexico in exchange for U.S. President Rutherford B. Hayes's official recognition of the Díaz regime. Instead, Díaz befriended Frisbie and flipped him to the side of Mexico by offering him a rail concession. Now working for Díaz, Frisbie persuaded the Hayes administration to recognize Díaz's government (without requiring the latter to sell more territory). In early 1878, Frisbie permanently moved with his family to Mexico, where President Díaz gave him an abandoned gold mine. Soon Frisbie was back in business, not only in mining but also in railroads and steamships as well. From that point forward, when Frisbie returned to the United States, "it was as Díaz's agent". However, despite Frisbie's various efforts on his behalf, Díaz snubbed Frisbie several times, such as by denying his request for an honorary commission and refusing to stand beside Frisbie at the wedding of Frisbie's son to become his compadrazgo.

Fannie Frisbie disliked living in Mexico. She frequently returned to the city of Vallejo to enroll her children in California schools and moved back there in 1899. Her husband rejoined her that winter, his first trip back to Vallejo in 21 years, with the intent to remain there, but their plans did not work out and they moved back to Mexico. By the time Frisbie died in Mexico at age eighty-six, his net worth was over a million U.S. dollars (spread over a variety of investments), and he was survived by seven living children. He was reportedly the wealthiest American expatriate then resident in Mexico at the time.

The steamship General Frisbie, built 1900, was named for Frisbie.
