= Photographer =

Person who makes photographs

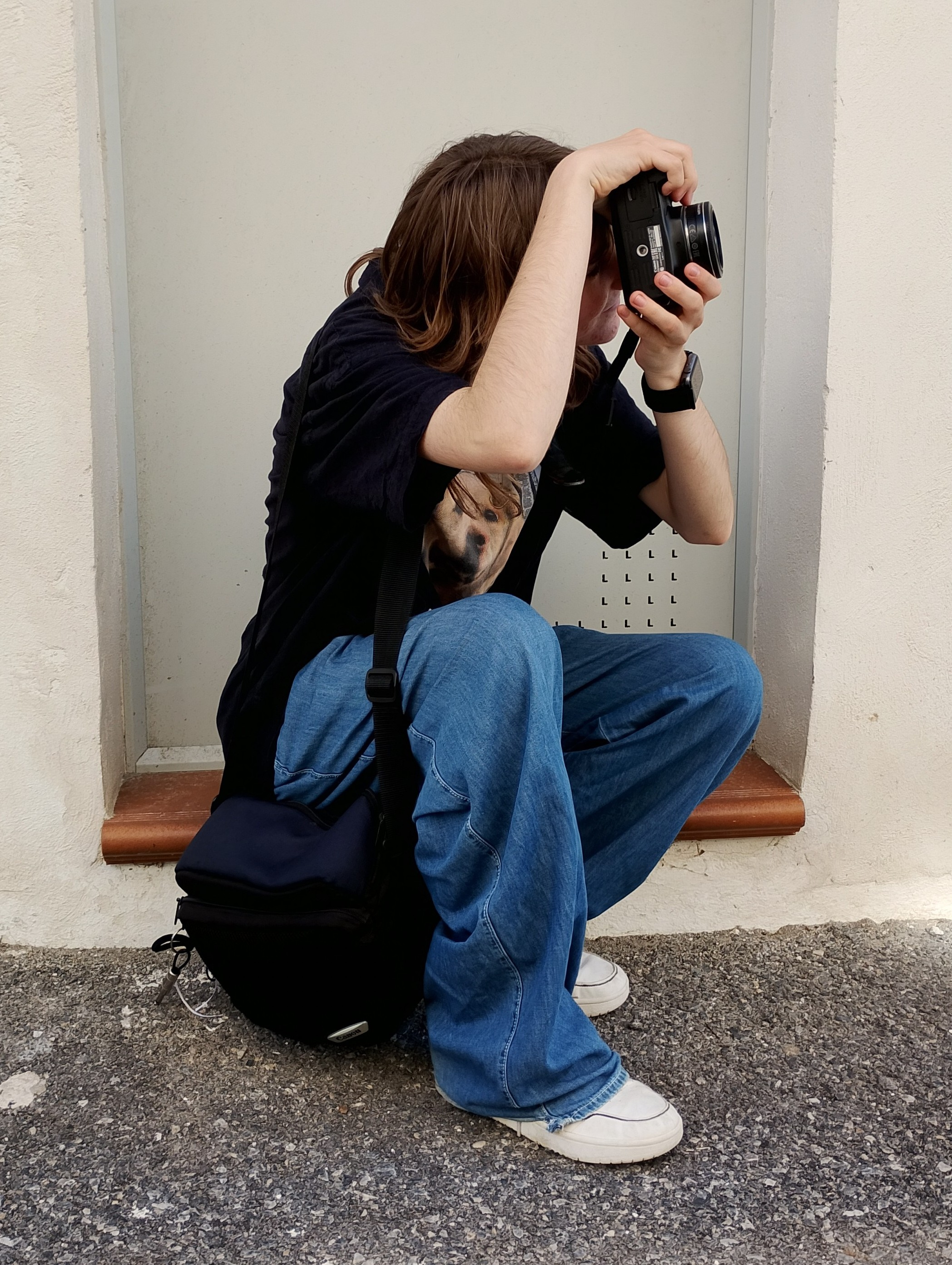
An amateur photographer using a handheld camera

A photographer is a person who makes photographs, most commonly using a camera. (Note: This includes camera phones. See: Cameraless photography) They may do so as part of photojournalism, for the sake of creating personal mementos, as part of a business model, as artistic expression or for various other reasons.

Photography has become extremely widespread and common in the 21st century. The term photographer is typically applied more narrowly to one who practices photography as a serious or semi-serious pursuit.

== Etymology ==
The word photography, and by extension photographer, is derived from the Greek φῶς (phos), meaning "light", and γραφή (graphê), meaning "drawing, writing", combining to mean "drawing with light".

== Types of photographers ==
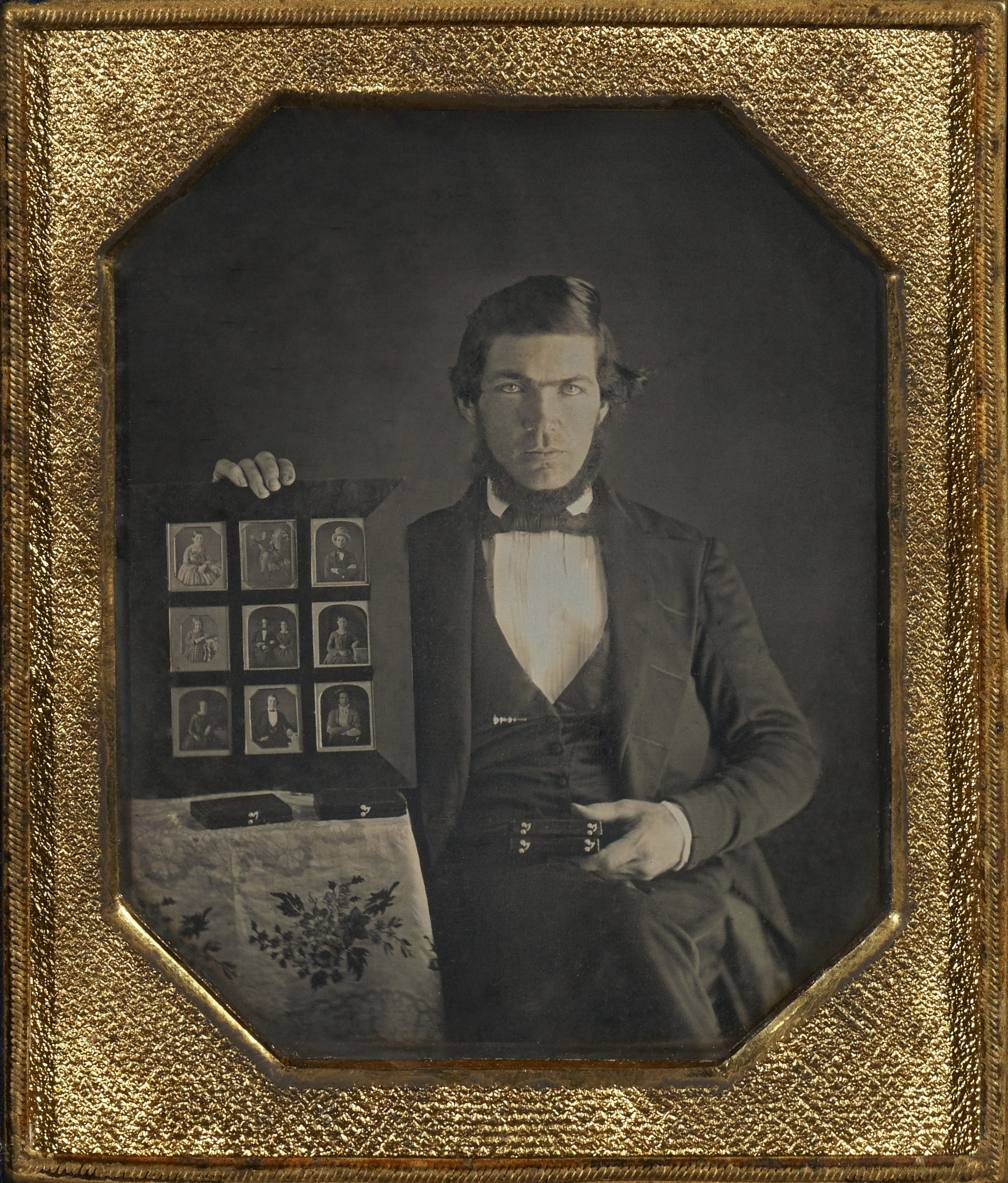
A photographer with his daguerrotypes, 1845

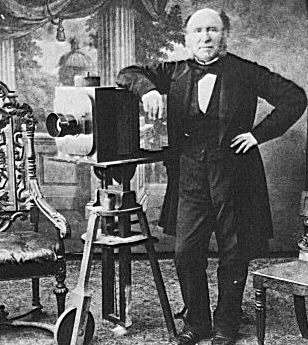
An English photographer in his studio, in the 1850s

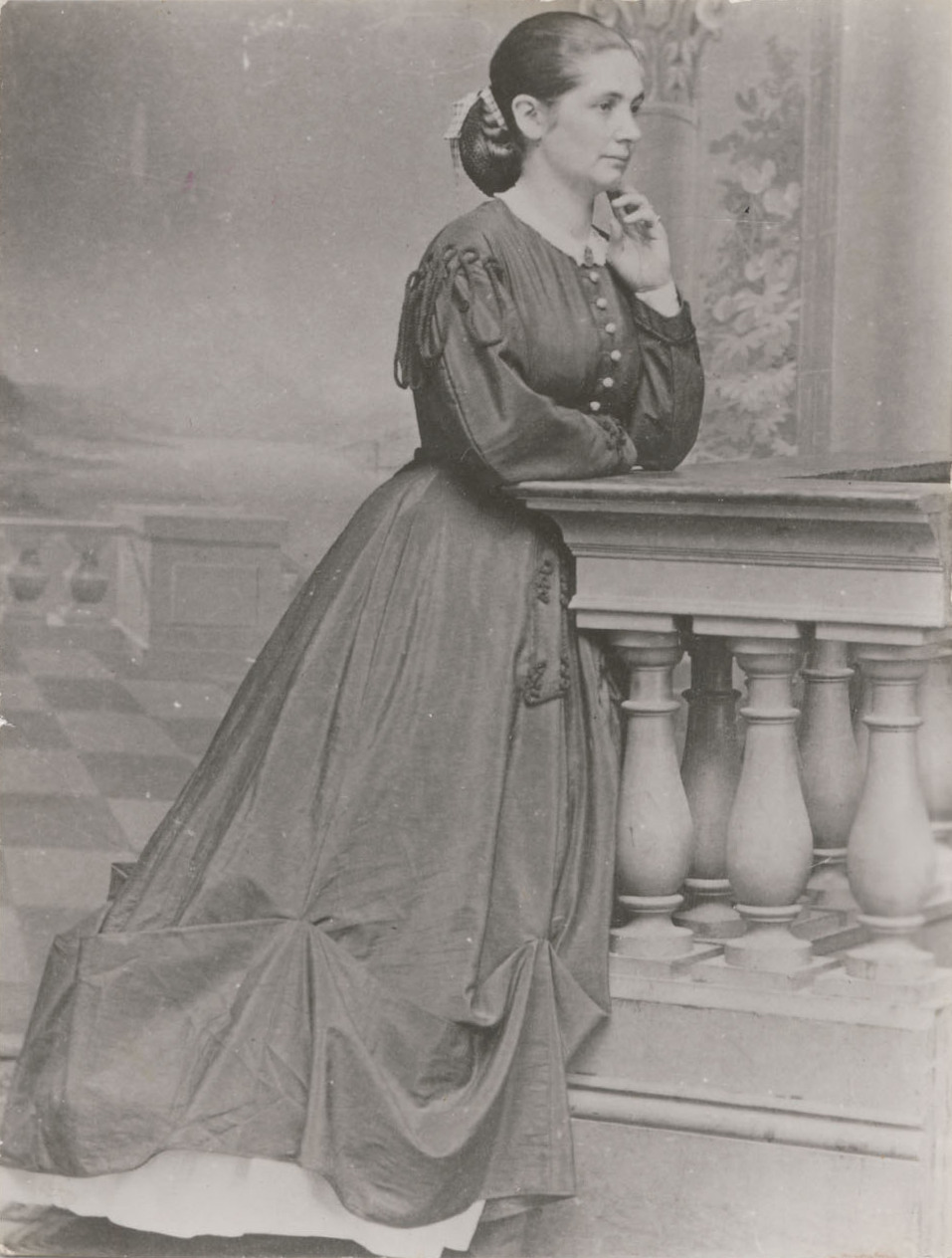
Epifania de Guadalupe Vallejo, the earliest known photographer active in what is the present-day West Coast of the United States.

As in other arts, the definitions of amateur and professional are not entirely categorical.

An amateur photographer takes snapshots for pleasure to remember events, places or friends with no intention of selling the images to others. This is most commonly done with a professional level camera such as a DSLR, and is also increasingly done with a smartphone camera.

A professional photographer is likely to take photographs for a session and image purchase fee, by salary or through the display, resale or use of those photographs.

A professional photographer may be a freelancer or an employee, for example of a newspaper, or may contract to cover a particular planned event such as a wedding or graduation, or to illustrate an advertisement. Others, like fine art photographers, are freelancers, first making an image and then licensing or making printed copies of it for sale or display. Some workers, such as crime scene photographers, estate agents, journalists and scientists, make photographs as part of other work. Photographers who produce moving rather than still pictures are often called cinematographers, videographers or camera operators, depending on the commercial context.

The term professional may also imply preparation, for example, by academic study or apprenticeship by the photographer in pursuit of photographic skills. A hallmark of a professional is often that they invest in continuing education through associations. While there is no compulsory registration requirement for professional photographer status, operating a business requires having a business license in most cities and counties. Similarly, having commercial insurance is required by most venues if photographing a wedding or a public event. Photographers who operate a legitimate business can provide these items.

Photographers can be categorized based on the type of photography they specialize in, which may include landscape photography, portrait photography, still life photography, sports photography, street photography, documentary photography, fashion photography, wedding photography, war photography, wildlife photography, photojournalism, aviation photography and more.

=== Photographers ===
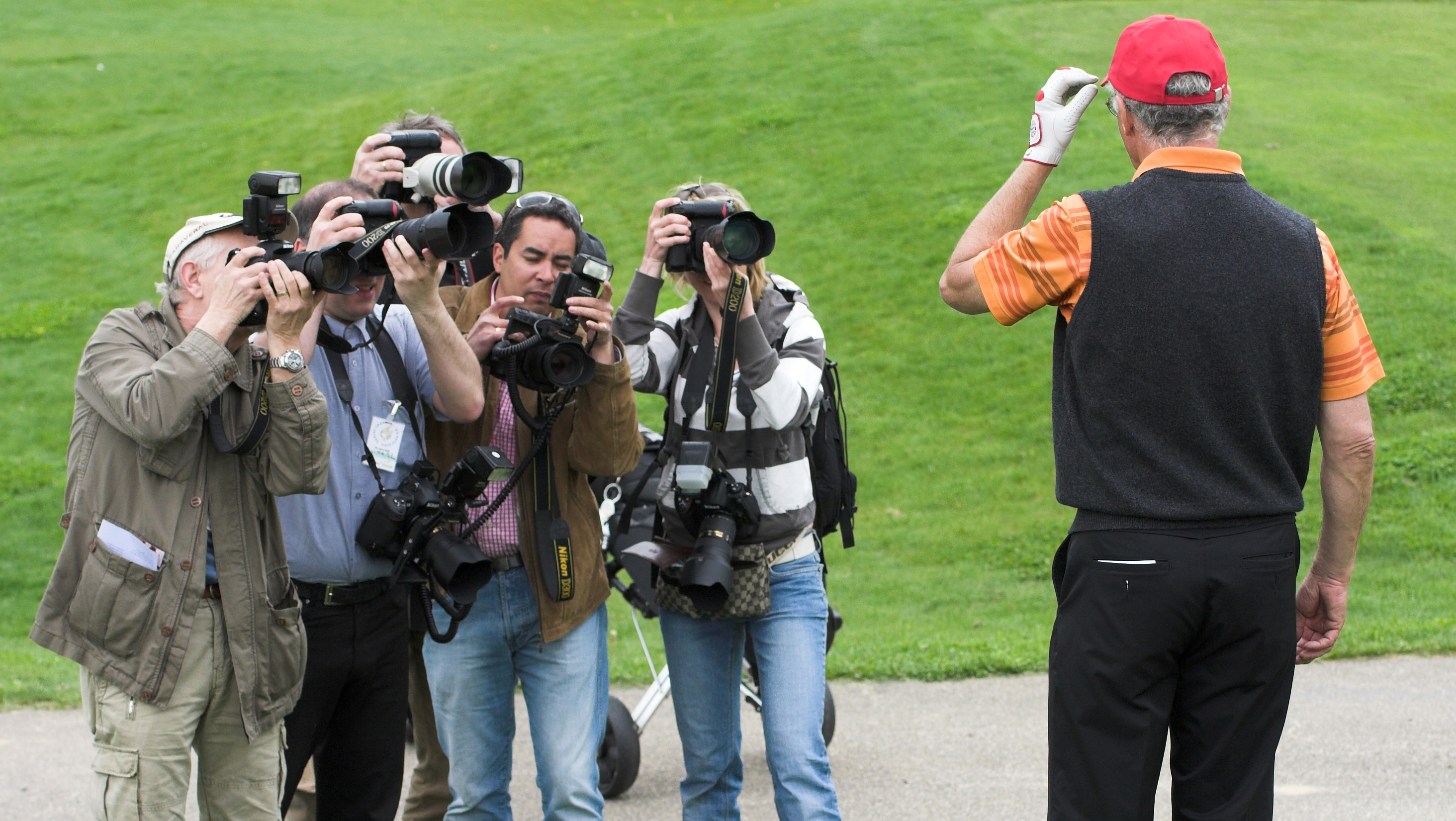
A group photographing retired footballer Franz Beckenbauer.

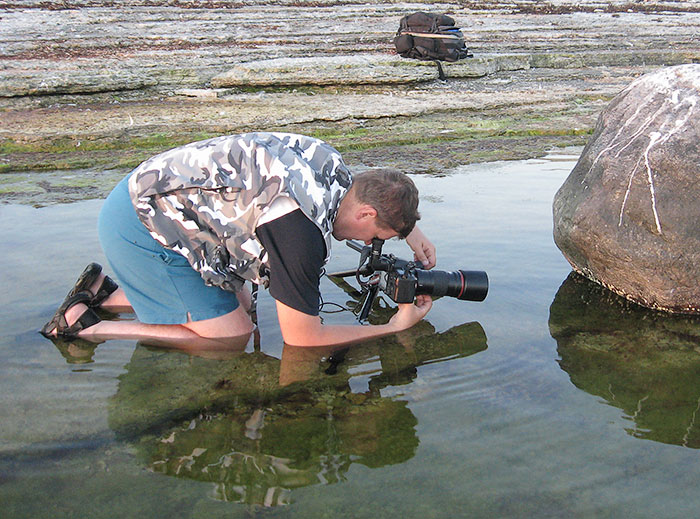
Nature photographer Urmas Tartes working on an outdoor environment.

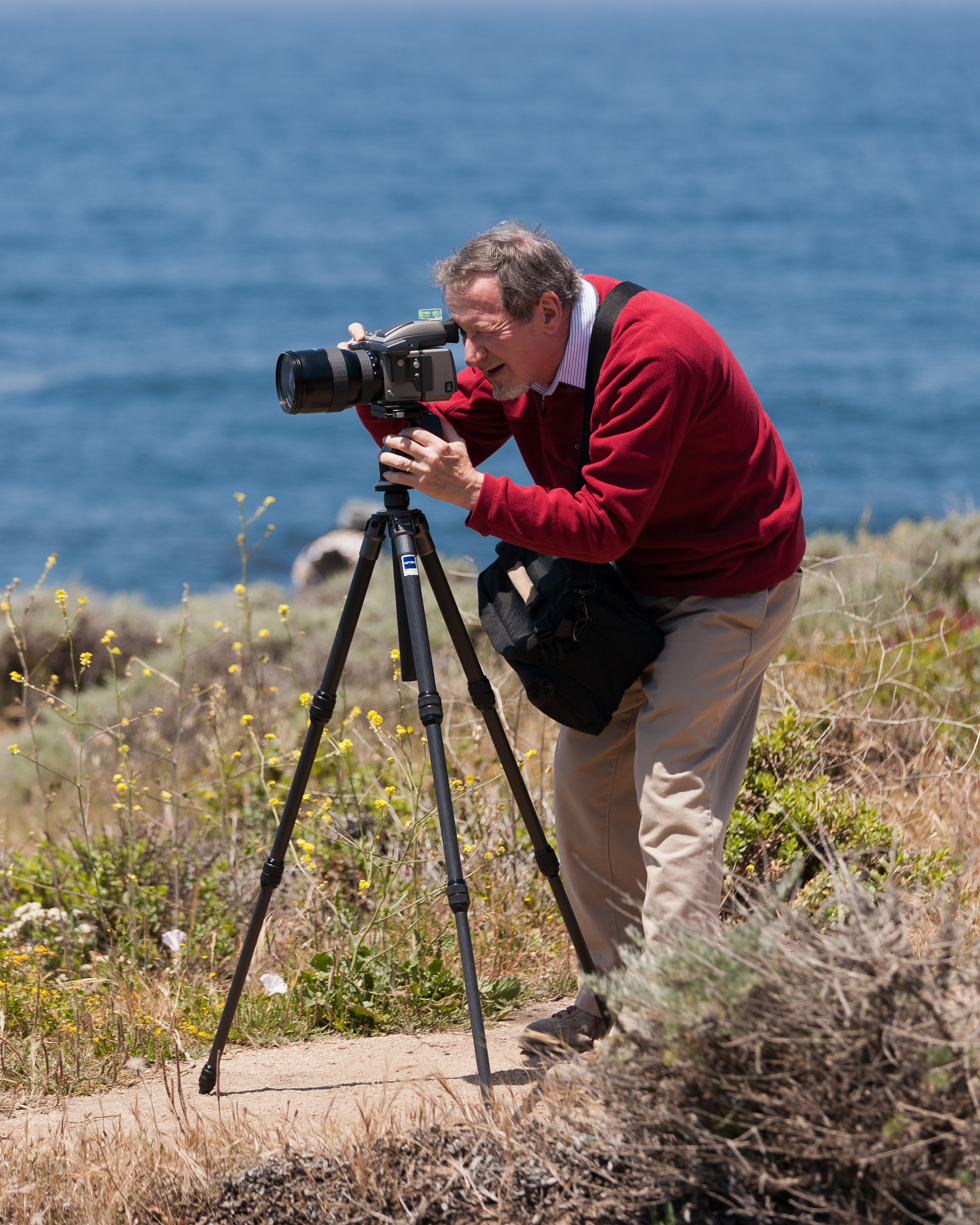
A photographer (Douglas Osheroff) setting up a shot with the aid of a tripod.

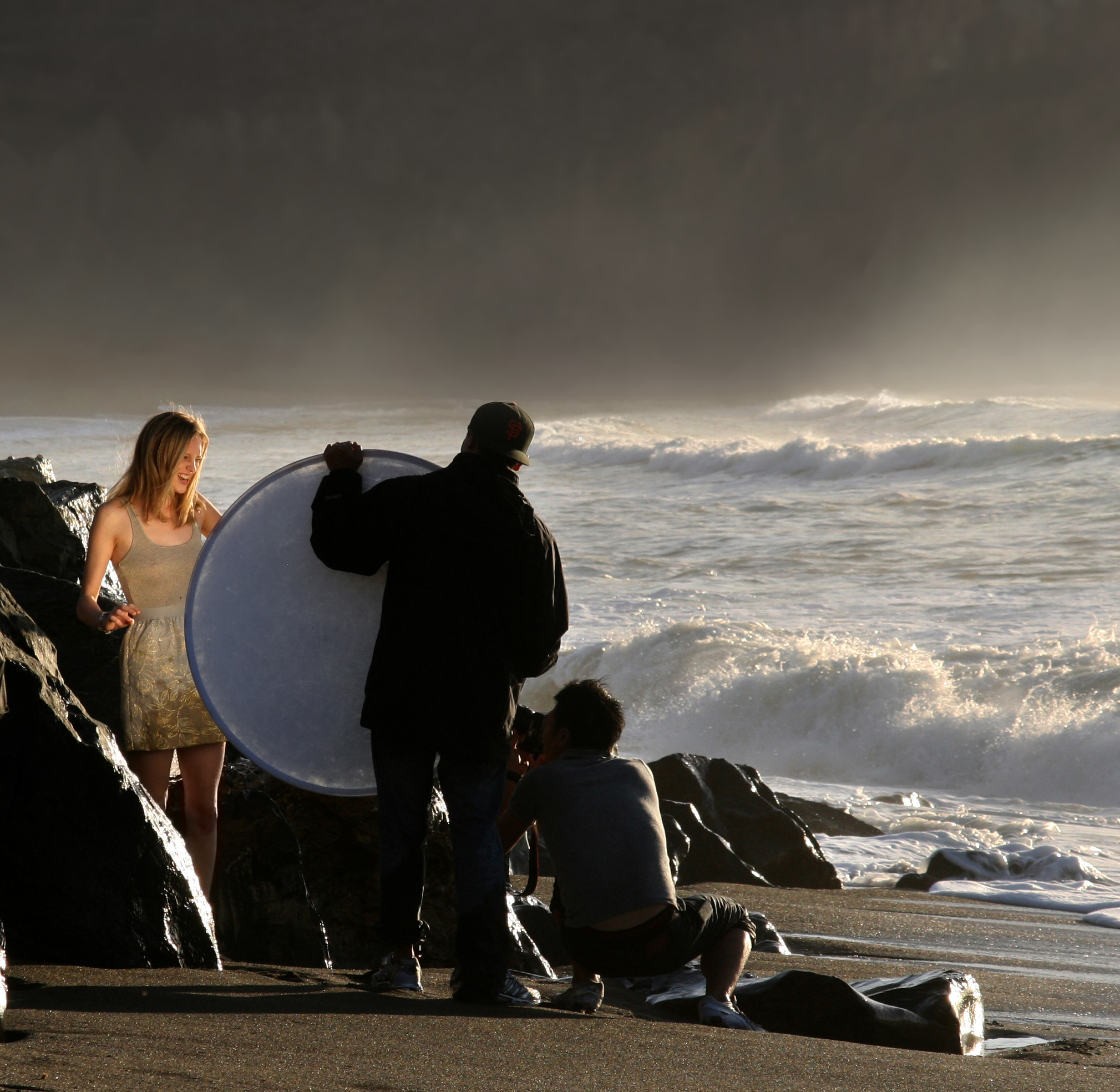
Photographing a model. An assistant is holding a reflector.

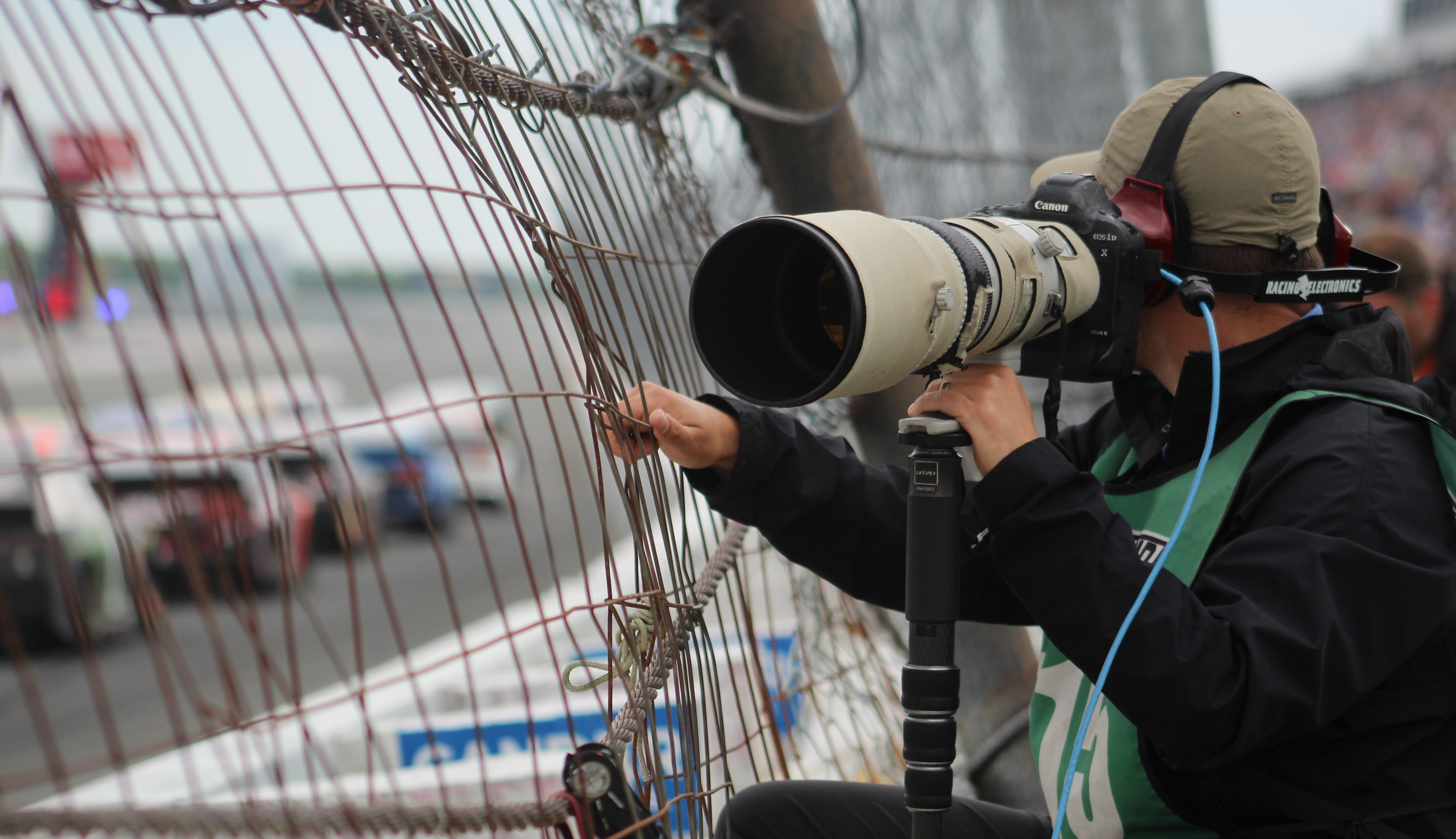
Sports photographer during 2019 Pocono 400

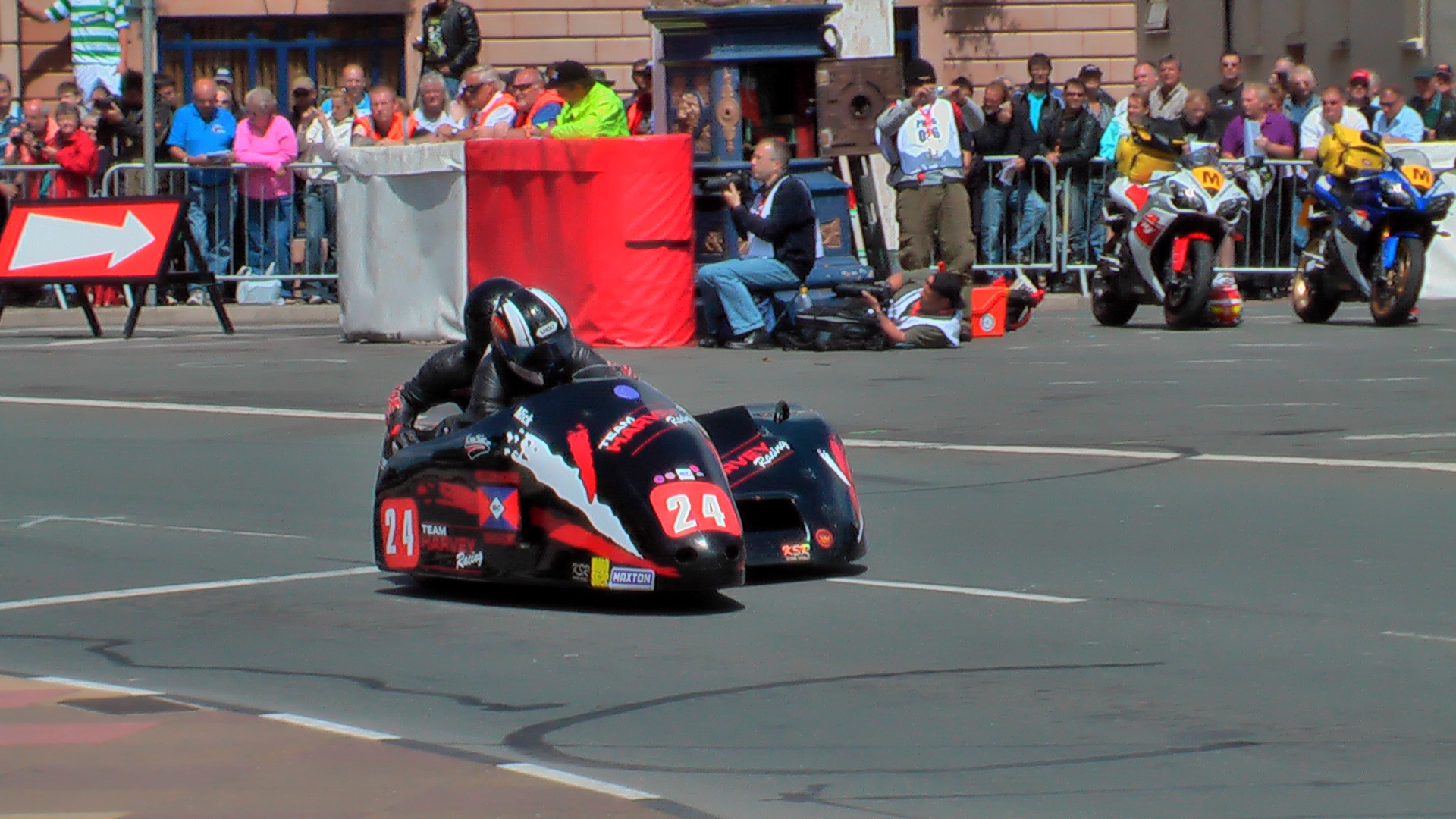
Sanctioned motorsport photographers identified by individually numbered white bibs on a road-course in the Isle of Man with public spectator area behind.

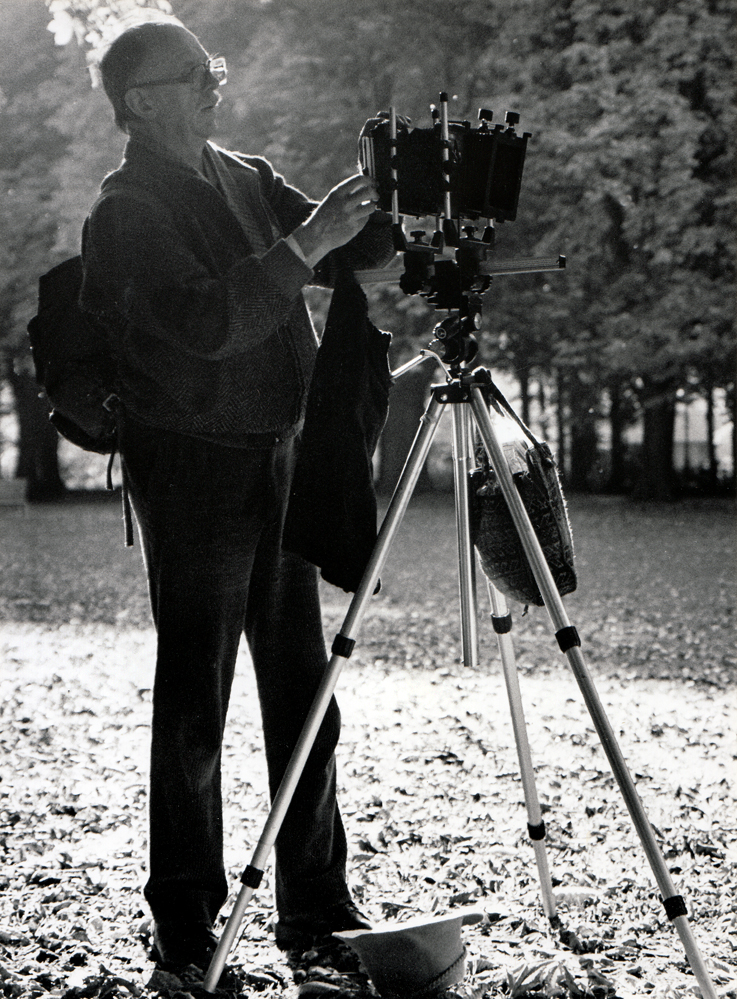
A photographer and his large format camera 1985.

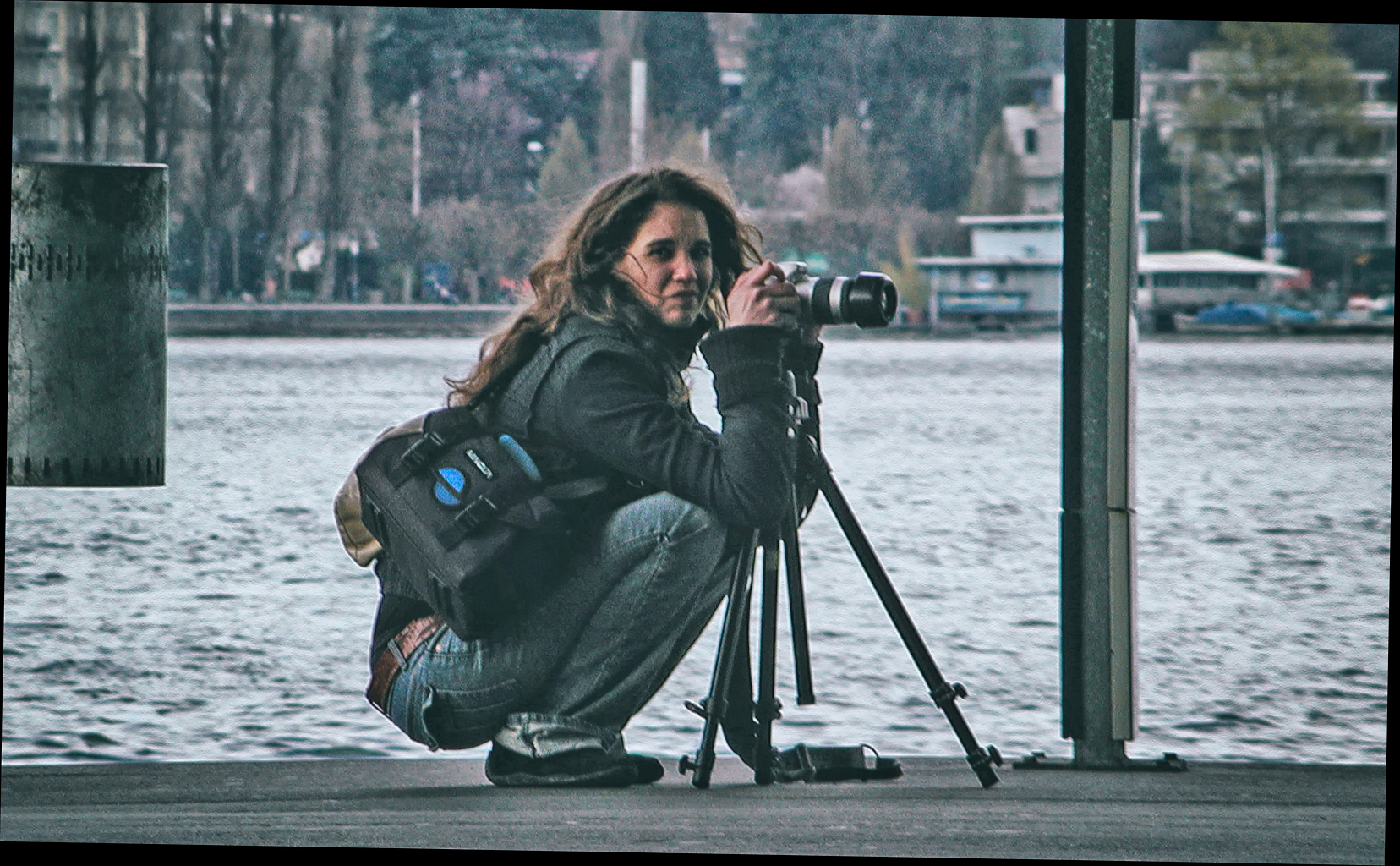
Photojournalist in Lucerne.

== Selling photographs ==
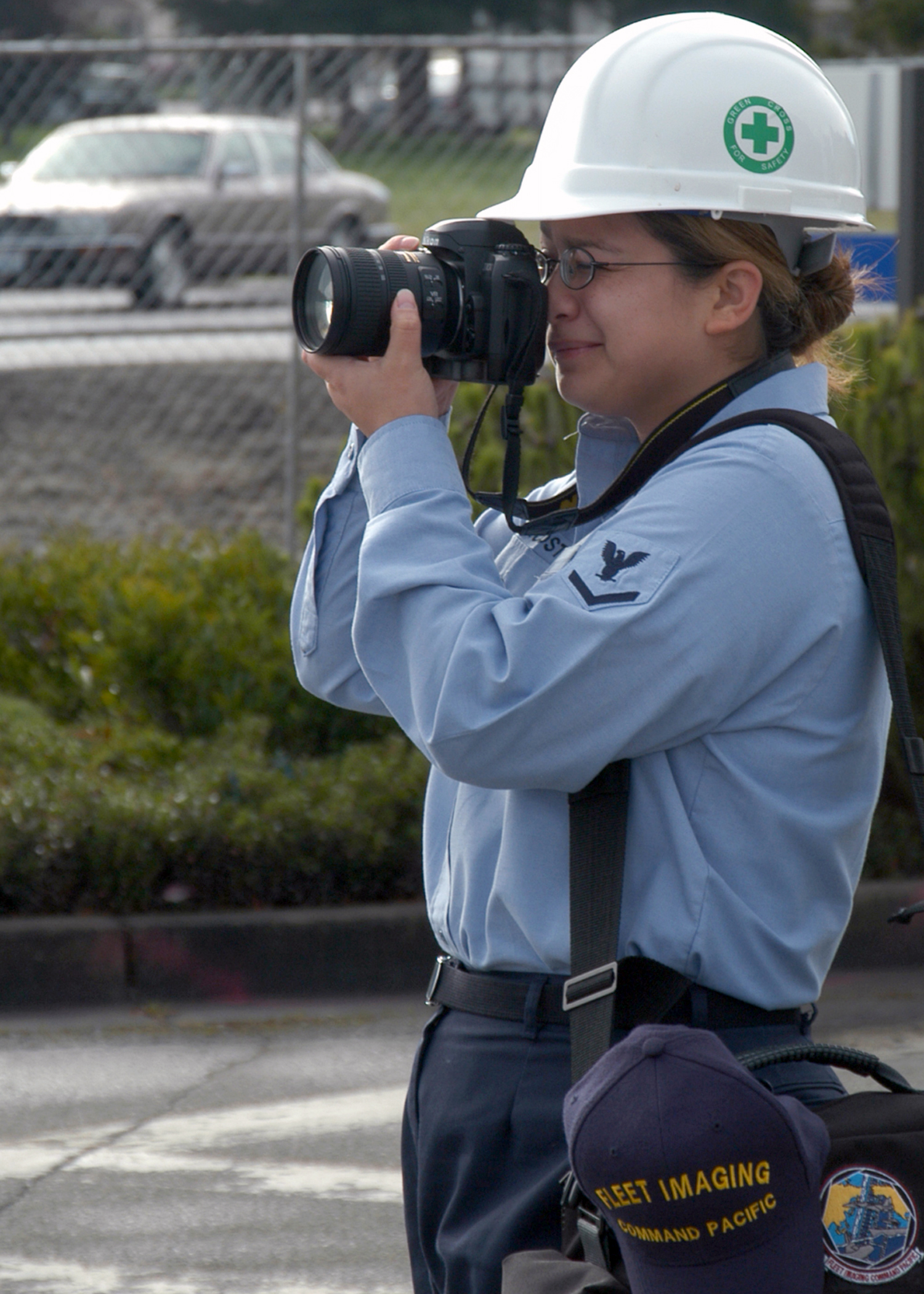
A U.S. Navy photographer in March 2004.

The exclusive right of photographers to copy and use their products is protected by copyright. Countless industries purchase photographs for use in publications and on products. The photographs seen on magazine covers, in television advertising, on greeting cards or calendars, on websites, or on products and packages, have generally been purchased for this use, either directly from the photographer or through an agency that represents the photographer. A photographer uses a contract to sell the "license" or use of their photograph with exact controls regarding how often the photograph will be used, in what territory it will be used (for example U.S. or U.K. or other), and exactly for which products. This is usually referred to as usage fee and is used to distinguish from production fees (payment for the actual creation of a photograph or photographs). An additional contract and royalty would apply for each additional use of the photograph.

The contract may be for only one year, or other duration. The photographer usually charges a royalty as well as a one-time fee, depending on the terms of the contract. The contract may be for non-exclusive use of the photograph (meaning the photographer can sell the same photograph for more than one use during the same year) or for exclusive use of the photograph (i.e. only that company may use the photograph during the term). The contract can also stipulate that the photographer is entitled to audit the company for determination of royalty payments. Royalties vary depending on the industry buying the photograph and the use, for example, royalties for a photograph used on a poster or in television advertising may be higher than for use on a limited run of brochures. A royalty is also often based on the size at which the photo will be used in a magazine or book, and cover photos usually command higher fees than photos used elsewhere in a book or magazine.

Photos taken by a photographer while working on assignment are often work for hire belonging to the company or publication unless stipulated otherwise by contract. Professional portrait and wedding photographers often stipulate by contract that they retain the copyright of their photos, so that only they can sell further prints of the photographs to the consumer, rather than the customer reproducing the photos by other means. If the customer wishes to be able to reproduce the photos themselves, they may discuss an alternative contract with the photographer in advance before the pictures are taken, in which a larger upfront fee may be paid in exchange for reprint rights passing to the customer.

There are major companies who have maintained catalogues of stock photography and images for decades, such as Getty Images and others. Since the turn of the 21st century, many online stock photography catalogues have appeared that invite photographers to sell their photos online easily and quickly, but often for very little money, without a royalty, and without control over the use of the photo, the market it will be used in, the products it will be used on, time duration, etc. These online stock photography catalogues have drastically changed the landscape of the industry, presenting both opportunities and challenges for photographers seeking to earn a living through their craft.

Commercial photographers may also promote their work to advertising and editorial art buyers via printed and online marketing vehicles.

== Photo sharing ==
Many people upload their photographs to social media and other websites, in order to share them with a particular group or with the general public. Those interested in legal precision may explicitly release them to the public domain or under a free content license. Some sites, including Wikimedia Commons, are strict about licenses and only accept pictures with clear information about permitted use.

== See also ==
- List of most expensive photographs
- List of photographs considered the most important
- Photograph manipulation
