= Epifania de Guadalupe Vallejo =

Mexican photographer (1835–1905)

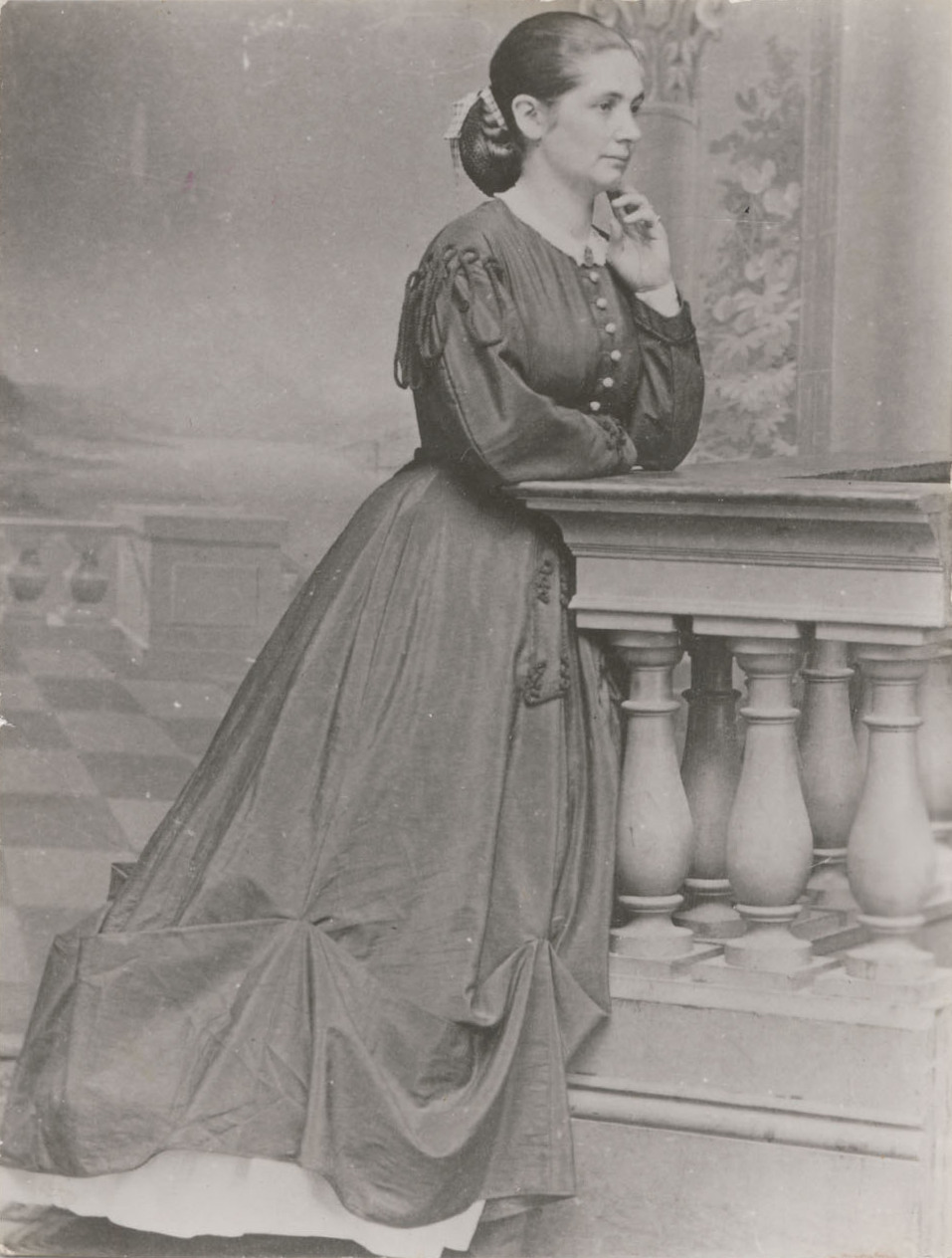
- photograph of Epifania Vallejo, c. 1865
- Born: August 4, 1835; Mission San Francisco Solano, California
- Died: February 14, 1905 (aged 69); Cuautla, Morelos
- Occupation: Photographer
- Spouse(s): John B. Frisbie
- Children: 8
- Parent(s): Mariano Guadalupe Vallejo; Francisca Benicia Carrillo de Vallejo

Epifania de Guadalupe Vallejo de Frisbie (August 4, 1835 – February 14, 1905) was a Californio photographer. She is the earliest known photographer on the West Coast of the present-day United States.

== Early life and education ==
Epifania de Guadalupe Vallejo was born on August 4, 1835, at the Mission San Francisco Solano in the Alta California territory of Mexico. Nicknamed "Fannie" or "Fanny", she was the third of sixteen children of General Mariano Guadalupe Vallejo, a general, politician, and landowner, and Francisca Benicia Carrillo Vallejo. She grew up on Lachryma Montis, the sprawling Vallejo estate in present-day Sonoma, California. She was educated by private tutors and learned piano and painting.

== Photography ==
Around 1847, when she was about 12 years old, she acquired a daguerreotype camera. Daguerreotypes were relatively new – they had just been introduced commercially in 1839 – and it is not known how she obtained the camera or learned the difficult process of long exposures and chemical processing on the California frontier while still a young teenager. In the late 20th century, a Vallejo descendant uncovered family correspondence and a ring owned by General Vallejo with a photograph of Fannie Vallejo's mother mounted inside which established her photographic activity.

== Personal life ==
In 1851, when she was 15 years old, she married 26-year-old US Army Captain John Blackman Frisbie. They had eight children. After living in various cities in California, they settled in Mexico City around 1877 or 1878.

== Death ==
Epifania de Guadalupe Vallejo died of pneumonia on February 14, 1905, aged 69, in Cuautla.
