= Mariano Guadalupe Vallejo =

Early State of California politician (1807–1890)

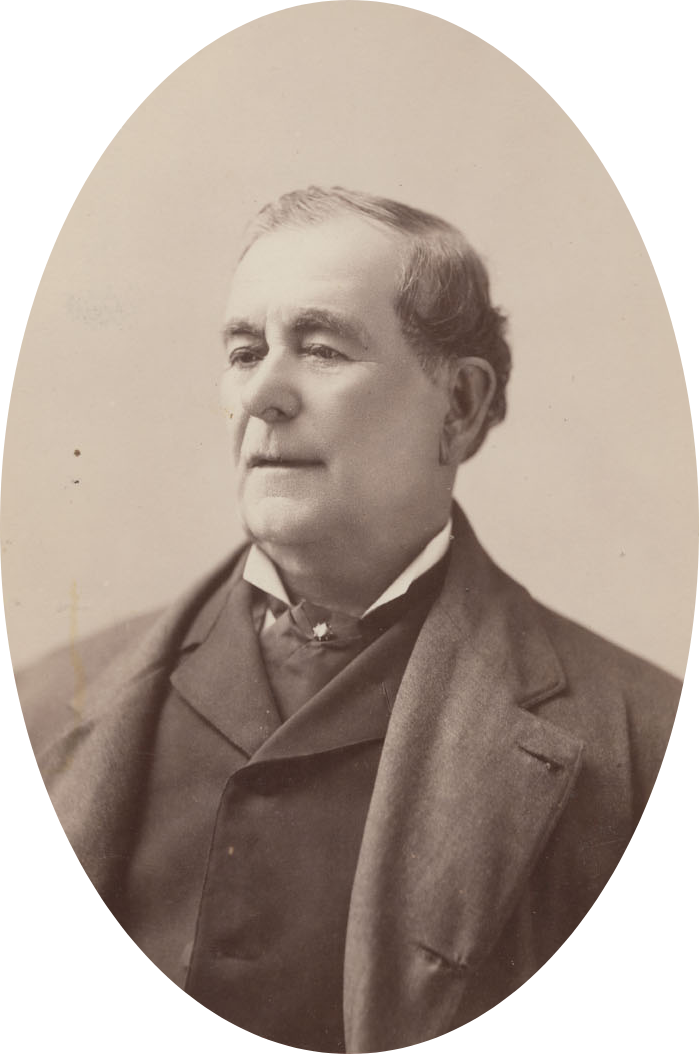
- Portrait c. 1880–1885

Member of the California Senate from the Sonoma district
- In office December 27, 1849 – January 6, 1851
- Preceded by: Jonas Spect
- Succeeded by: Martin E. Cooke

Member of the Diputación de Alta California for San Francisco
- In office 1831
- Constituency: Presidio of San Francisco

Personal details
- Born: July 4, 1807 Monterey, Alta California, Viceroyalty of New Spain (now California, U.S.)
- Died: January 18, 1890 (aged 82) Sonoma, California, U.S.
- Resting place: Mountain Cemetery, Sonoma, California, U.S.
- Citizenship: Spain; Mexico; United States
- Spouse: Francisca Benicia Carrillo (m. 1832)
- Children: 16, including Epifania
- Relatives: Juan Bautista Alvarado (nephew); José Antonio Romualdo Pacheco, Jr. (nephew); John B. Frisbie (son-in-law); Arpad Haraszthy (son-in-law)
- Occupation: Military commander, politician, rancher
- Known for: Namesake of Vallejo, California

Military service
- Allegiance: Alta California
- Rank: Colonel
- Battles/wars: Mexican–American War; Bear Flag Revolt

Don Mariano Guadalupe Vallejo (July 7, 1807 – January 18, 1890) (Spanish pronunciation: [maˈɾjano ɣwaðaˈlupe βaˈʎexo] mah-RYAH-noh gwah-dah-LOO-peh vah-YEH-hoh) was a Californio general, statesman, and public figure. He was born a subject of Spain, performed his military duties as an officer of the Republic of Mexico, and shaped the transition of Alta California from a territory of Mexico to the U.S. state of California. He served in the first session of the California State Senate. The city of Vallejo, California, is named after him, and the nearby city of Benicia is named after his wife Francisca Benicia Carrillo.

== Early career ==
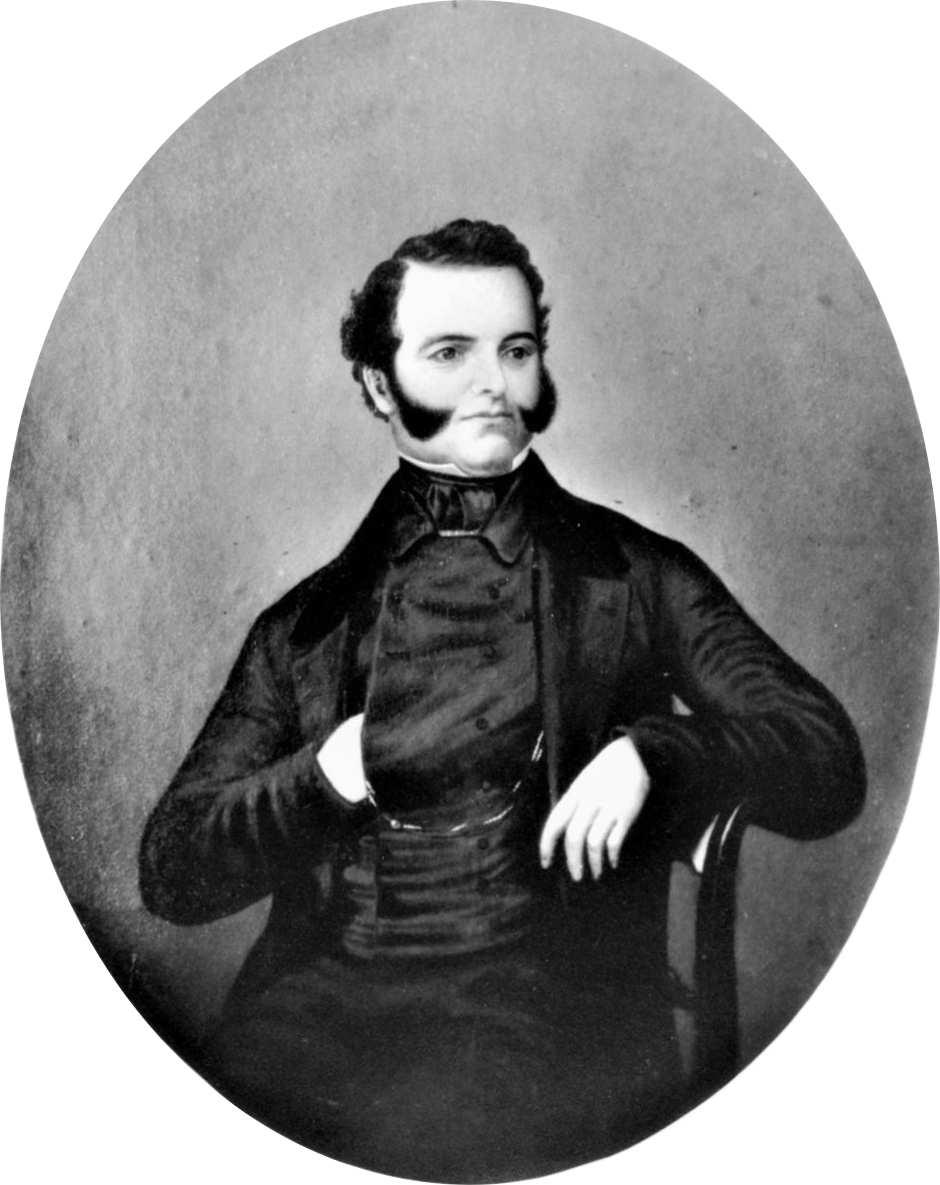
Portrait of Vallejo c. 1830

Mariano Vallejo was born in Monterey, California, the eighth of thirteen children and third son of Ignacio Vicente Ferrer Vallejo and María Antonia Lugo.

There is controversy over Vallejo's exact date of birth. According to Vallejo, and his family bible, he was born on 7 July 1807. His baptismal certificate, however, signed by Fr. Baltasar Carnicer states that he was baptized on 5 July 1807, and born the previous night (4 July 1807). Other sources state a birthdate of 7 July 1808.

Mariano Guadalupe Vallejo's parents were wed at Santa Barbara Mission on February 18, 1791. His paternal grandparents were Gerónimo Vallejo and Antonia Gómez, and his maternal grandparents were Francisco Lugo and Juana María Rita Martínez. His father's great grandfather, Pedro Vallejo, was said to have served as viceroy of New Spain, although his name does not appear on the list of viceroys. Other documents show his paternal great grandfather to be Jose Inocencio Vallejo y Olvera Gordivar instead. Born 1656 in Tapatitlan de Morelos and died in 1770, father of Juan Lucas Vallejo de Cornejo y Ramirez (1688–1713), father of Geronimo Vallejo. Earlier Vallejo ancestors were said to include a captain who served under Hernan Cortés and an admiral, Alonso Vallejo, said to be the commander of the ship which brought Columbus back to Spain as a prisoner in 1500. However, these ancestors were probably only a family mythology. Ignacio himself had been a well considered sergeant (sargento distinguido) at the Presidio of Monterey, who eventually served as Alcalde of San José.

As a teenager, Mariano, his nephew Juan Bautista Alvarado (1809–1882), and José Castro (1808–1860) received special instruction from Governor Pablo Vicente de Solá. The boys received government documents and newspapers from Mexico City, as well as access to the governor's personal library. Vallejo then worked as a clerk for English merchant William Hartnell, who taught Vallejo English, French, and Latin.

Vallejo was serving as the personal secretary to the new Governor of California, Luis Argüello, when news of Mexico's independence reached Monterey. Argüello enrolled Vallejo as a cadet in the Presidio company in 1824. After being promoted to corporal, Argüello appointed Vallejo to the diputación, the territorial legislature. He was promoted to alférez (equal to a modern army second lieutenant), and in 1829, Vallejo led a group of soldiers against the Miwoks, under chief Estanislao. After a three-day battle, Vallejo's troops forced the Miwok to flee to Mission San José, seeking refuge with the padres.

== Rise to power ==
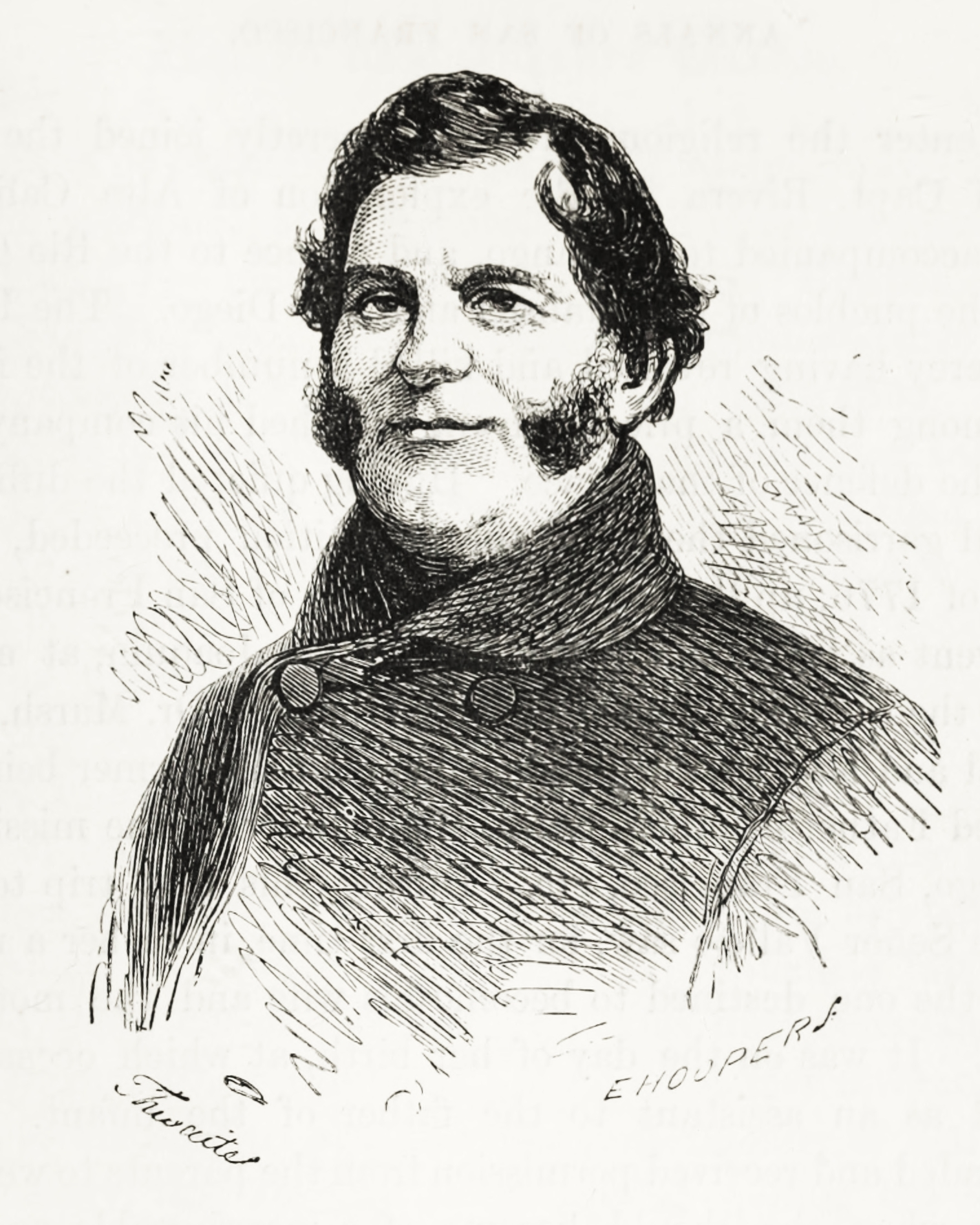
Engraving of Vallejo from 1855

In 1831 Vallejo participated in the "emergency installation" of Pío Pico as acting Governor. Vallejo became the Commander of the Presidio of San Francisco in 1833, oversaw the secularization of Mission San Francisco Solano. Mission San Francisco Solano was taken over by General Mariano Guadalupe Vallejo. At first he gave some of the land to the native mission workers as ordered. But later he transferred all the land and building to own Rancho Petaluma Adobe of 44,000 acres in the Petaluma Valley. Vallejo laid out the town of Sonoma in 1835. He had a large plaza made in front of the old mission chapel. But then he took tiles from the church roof and put them on his own house. In poor shape the mission church later was torn down. In need of a church for the town he made, in 1840 Vallejo had a small chapel built where the original parish church was.

He founded the town of Sonoma, and was granted Rancho Petaluma by Governor José Figueroa in 1834. In 1835 he was appointed Comandante of the Fourth Military District and Director of Colonization of the Northern Frontier, the highest military command in Northern California. Vallejo began construction of the Presidio of Sonoma to counter the Russian presence at Fort Ross. Vallejo transferred most of the soldiers from San Francisco to Sonoma, and began construction of his two-story Casa Grande adobe on the town plaza. He formed an alliance with Sem-Yeto, also known as Chief Solano of the Suisunes tribe, providing Vallejo with over a thousand Suisunes allies during his conflicts with other tribes.

Governor Figueroa died in September 1835, and was replaced by Nicolás Gutiérrez, who was unpopular with the Californio population, resulting in an uprising headed by Juan Alvarado the next year. Alvarado tried to persuade Vallejo to join the uprising, but he declined to become involved. One hundred-seventy Californios led by José Castro and fifty Americans led by Isaac Graham marched on Monterey. After the rebels fired a single cannon shot into the Presidio, Governor Gutiérrez surrendered on November 5, 1836. On November 7, Alvarado wrote to his uncle Mariano, informing Vallejo he had claimed to be acting under Vallejo's orders and asking him to come to Monterey to take part in the government. Vallejo came to Monterey as a hero, and on November 29, the diputación promoted Vallejo from alférez to colonel and named him Comandante General of the "Free State of Alta California", while Alvarado was named Governor. The Federal Government in Mexico City would later endorse Vallejo and Alvarado's actions and confirm their new positions.

== Troubles ==
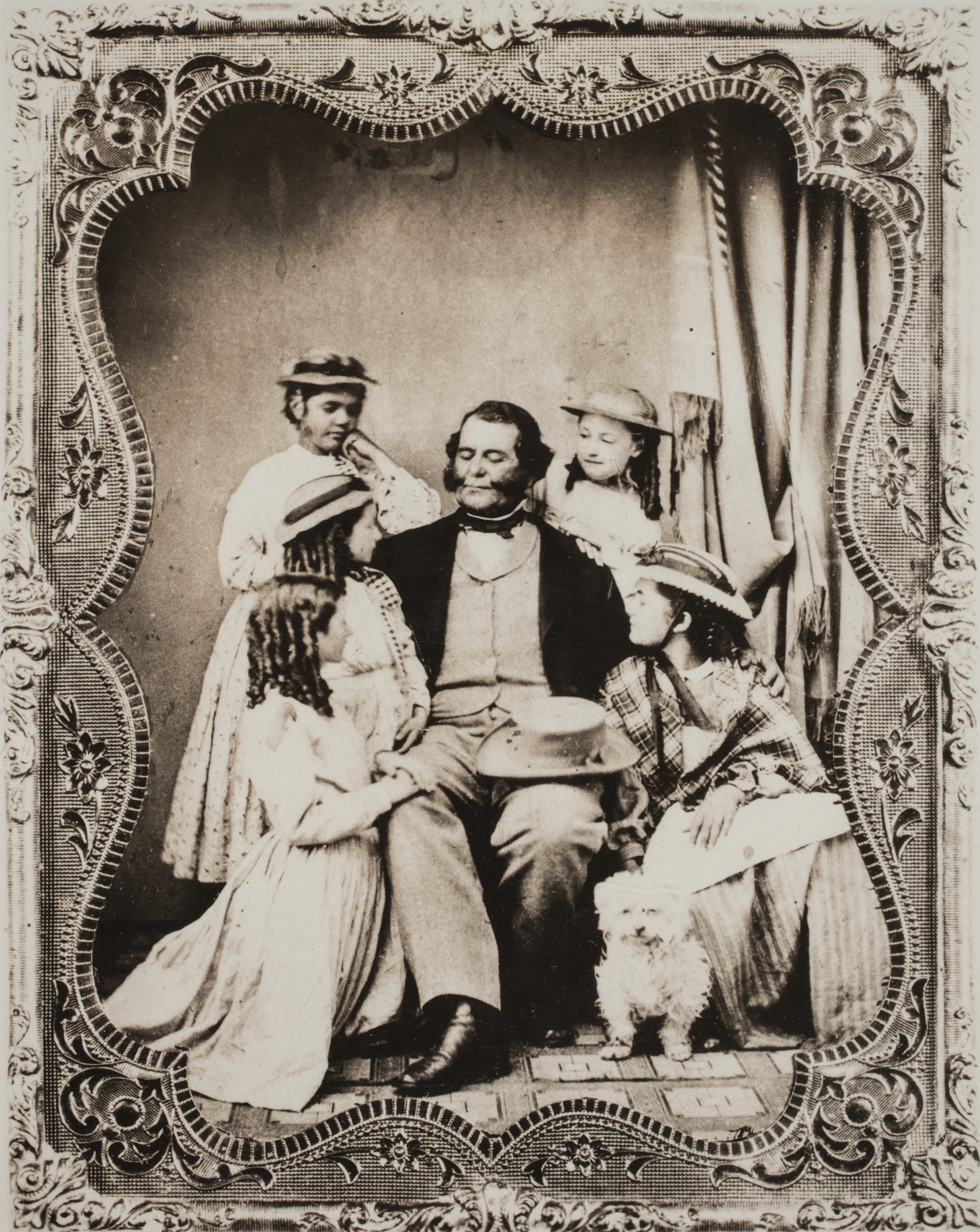
General Vallejo with his daughters and granddaughters in 1867

In 1840, Isaac Graham allegedly began agitating for a Texas-style revolution in California, in March issuing a notice for a planned horse race that was loosely construed into being a plot for revolt. Alvarado notified Vallejo of the situation, and in April the Californian military began arresting American and English immigrants, eventually detaining about 100 in the Presidio of Monterey. At the time, there were fewer than 400 foreigners from all nations in the department. Vallejo returned to Monterey and ordered Castro to take 47 of the prisoners to San Blas by ship, to be deported to their home countries. Under pressure from British and American diplomats, President Anastasio Bustamante released the remaining prisoners and began a court martial against Castro. Also assisting in the release of those caught up in the Graham Affair was American traveler Thomas J. Farnham. In 1841, Graham and 18 of his associates returned to Monterey, with new passports issued by the Mexican Federal Government.

Also in 1841, the Russians at Fort Ross offered to sell the post to Vallejo. After several months of negotiations and delays by the Mexican authorities and Governor Alvarado (who feared his uncle was plotting to overthrow him), John Sutter purchased the fort. This economic and military setback confirmed Vallejo's belief that it would be better if California was no longer ruled from Mexico City. Although both France and the United Kingdom expressed interest in acquiring Alta California, Vallejo believed the best hope for economic and cultural development lay with the United States.

In November 1841, Vallejo was meeting with José Castro at Mission San José when he was informed of the arrival in California of an immigrant party led by John Bidwell and John Bartleson. Half of the group was staying with Dr. John Marsh north of Mount Diablo, while the rest had continued on to San José. They were arrested before reaching the pueblo for illegally entering Mexico and brought to Vallejo at the mission. Vallejo's orders from Mexico City were clear. Americans entering Mexico without valid passports were to be sent back to the United States. However, after the Graham affair, Vallejo was reluctant to deport another group of Americans, especially those with skills useful for colonizing the northern frontier. These reasons, coupled with his disillusionment with the Mexican government, led Vallejo to grant passports to the immigrants detained in the mission and to give Marsh passports for those camped on his rancho.

In 1842, the Federal Government replaced Vallejo and his nephew Alvarado with Manuel Micheltorena as both civil and military Governor of Alta California. Micheltorena arrived with the batallón fijo, a force of 300 pardoned criminals, who out of desperation at not being paid began to loot the population.

== Bear Flag Revolt ==
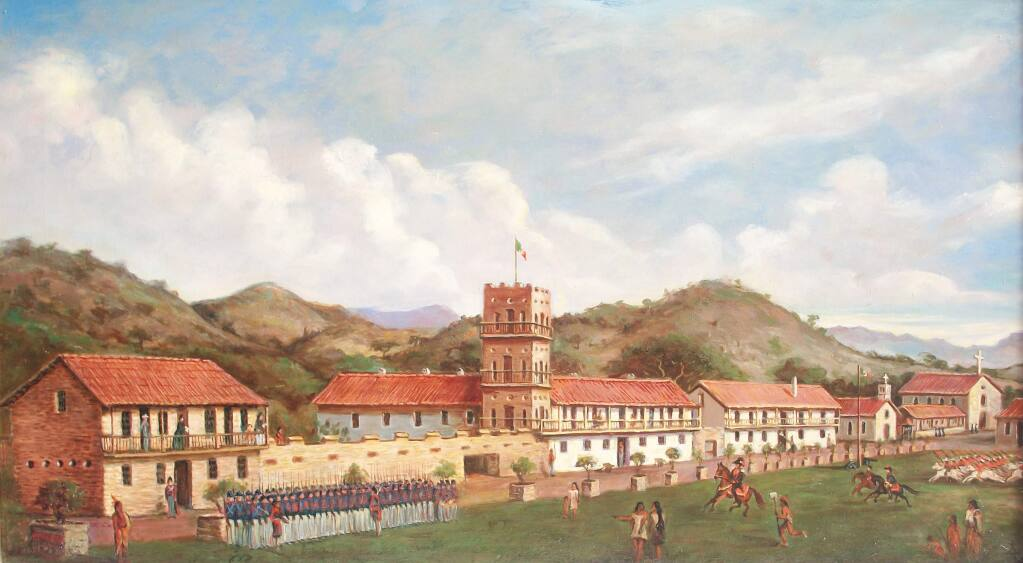
General Vallejo reviewing troops in Sonoma, 1846

In the early morning of June 14, 1846, Mariano Guadalupe Vallejo was taken prisoner by a ragtag band of Americans, led by Ezekiel Merritt, who had decided to emulate the Texans by revolting against California's Mexican government. They later made and raised an improvised flag featuring a grizzly bear that some viewers mistook for a pig. Instead of resisting, Vallejo, who favored the American takeover of California, invited the rebels inside his quarters in the Casa Grande for a meal and drinks. The Americans proceeded to get drunk while negotiating with Vallejo a letter of capitulation that guaranteed that neither Vallejo nor his family would be taken prisoner, which he unopposedly signed. However, when the agreement was presented to those outside they refused to endorse it. Rather than releasing the Mexican officers under parole they insisted they be held as hostages. Although Vallejo was sympathetic to the advent of American rule, he deemed the perpetrators of the Bear Flag Revolt to be mere lowlife rabble. As he wrote in his five-volume history,

if the men who hoisted the 'Bear Flag' had raised the flag that Washington sanctified by his abnegation and patriotism, there would have been no war on the Sonoma frontier, for all our minds were prepared to give a brotherly embrace to the sons of the Great Republic, whose enterprising spirit had filled us with admiration. Ill-advisedly, however, as some say, or dominated by a desire to rule without let or hindrance, as others say, they placed themselves under the shelter of a flag that pictured a bear, an animal that we took as the emblem of rapine and force. This mistake was the cause of all the trouble, for when the Californians saw parties of men running over their plains and forests under the 'Bear Flag,' they thought that they were dealing with robbers and took the steps they thought most effective for the protection of their lives and property.

Vallejo, his French secretary Victor Prudon, his brother Salvador Vallejo, and their brother-in-law Jacob P. Leese were taken as prisoners to John C. Frémont's camp in the Central Valley. Vallejo was confident that the insurgents were acting under Fremont's orders and had no reason to doubt that as soon as he met Fremont (whom he regarded as his friend), he and his companions would be released, so the prospect of being sent to Sutter's Fort did not worry him much. However, Frémont ordered they be kept prisoners in Sutter's Fort.

Conditions for the prisoners were good, until Frémont discovered they were well fed and allowed to walk around the fort several times a day. He replaced the jailer, instructing the replacement to treat them "no better than any other prisoner". Mariano contracted malaria while being held at the fort. After agreeing to remain neutral during the remainder of the war with Mexico, Mariano was released on August 2, 1846, after "John Murphy had arrived at Sutter's Fort with Stockton's new orders on August 1," and arrived at Casa Grande a day or two later, weighing only 96 pounds. Salvador Vallejo and Jacob P. Leese were released about a week later. By the time of his release, Mariano was still uncertain about his stance in the war. Because of his belief that California would thrive better with the United States, and that at this time, the Americans were in complete control of the northern area of California, he eventually sided with them. At his home, he showed his allegiance by burning his Mexican uniform in a dignified manner.

== State politics ==
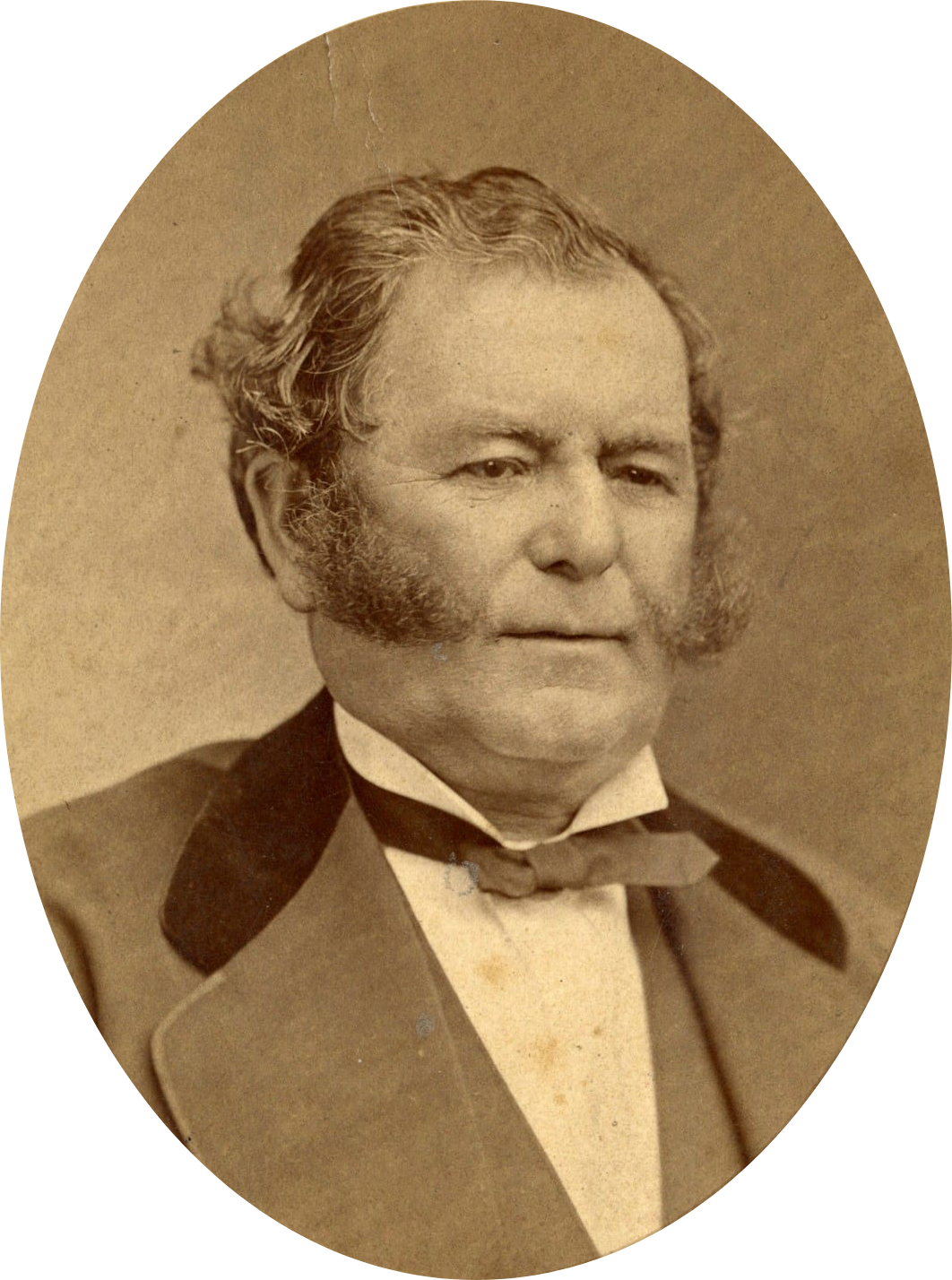
Portrait by Thomas Houseworth c. 1874–1886

Once the United States defeated Mexico in the war, Vallejo proved his allegiance to his new country by persuading wealthy Californios to accept American rule. An influential member of the state's Constitutional Convention, he was elected as a member of the first session of the State Senate in 1850. In 1843, he had been deeded title to Rancho Suscol. In 1850, he offered to donate 156 acres (0.6 km^{2}) of that land to the new state government on which to build a capitol away from its cramped quarters in San Jose and also offered to pay for a considerable amount of the construction. The offer was accepted by the new state legislature and signed into law by Governor John McDougall, convening in Vallejo, as the new city was named, for the first time in 1851. However, construction lagged, and state bureaucrats were confronted with inadequate, leaky buildings and a soggy location. Within three years, the state legislature and newly elected Governor John Bigler had authorized the capital's relocation three more times, to Sacramento, Benicia and finally a permanent return to Sacramento.

== Relationship with Native Americans ==
Vallejo, the city that was named after the General, was once home of the Coast Miwok as well as Suisunes and other Patwin Native American tribes. There are three confirmed Native American sites located in the rock outcrops in the hills above Blue Rock Springs Park. The California Archaeological Inventory has indicated that the three Indian sites are located on Sulphur Springs Mountain.

General Vallejo is in the history books as a person who "fought for the rights of the Native Americans", but also one who would "go out on raids into Indian territory to bring back new workers".

== Landholdings ==
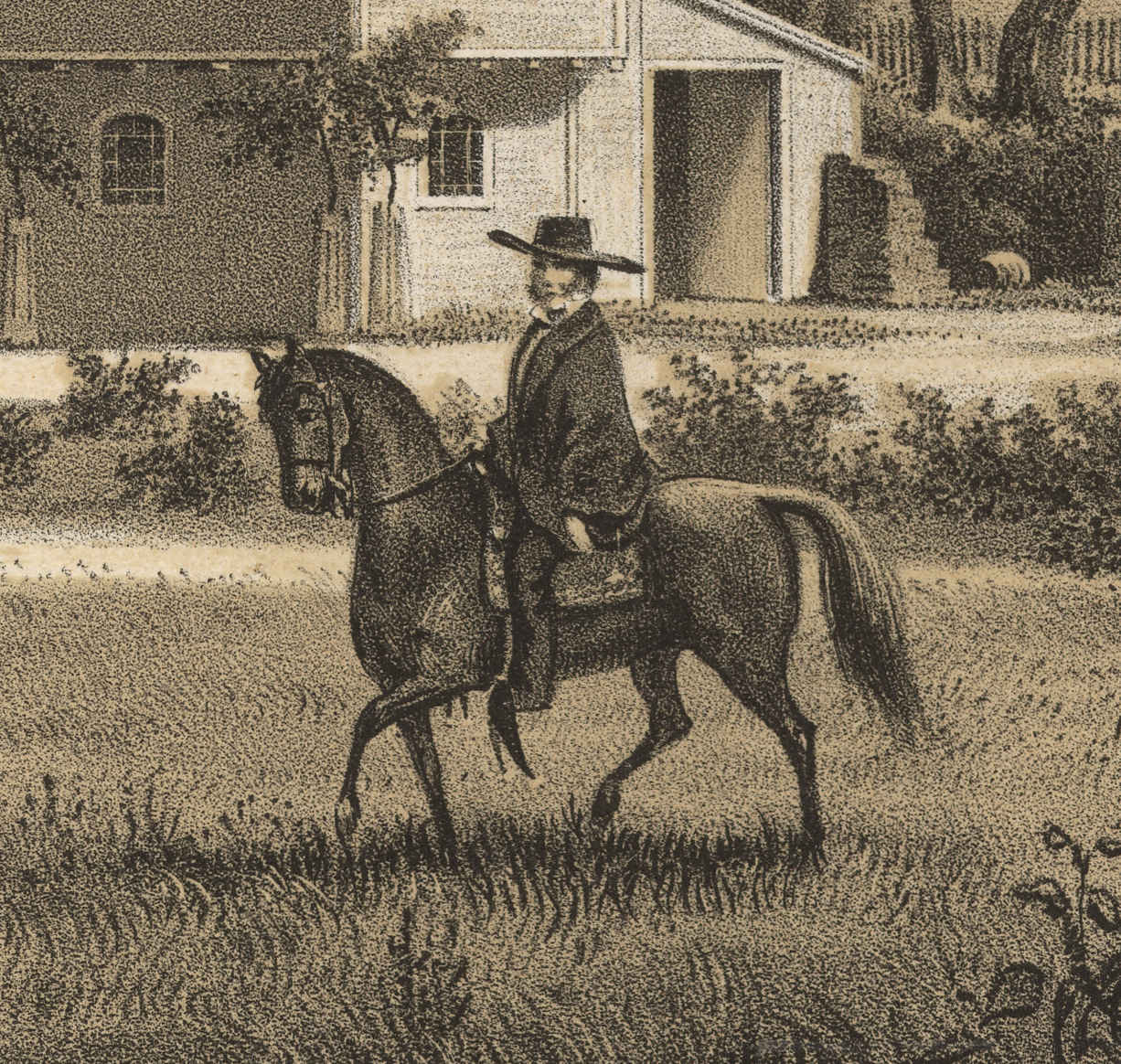
Vallejo on horseback at his Sonoma estate, Lachryma Montis, in 1857

Although the Treaty of Guadalupe Hidalgo formally protected the legal rights of Mexicans now part of the United States, a long legal challenge to Vallejo's land title cost him thousands of dollars in legal fees and finally deprived him of almost all his land and farm animals. Most Californios could not afford the legal expenses to claim their lands, which were thus lost to wealthy Americans and the flood of immigrants, beginning with the Gold Rush, which left the Californios outnumbered and unable to protect their political power. At some time prior to 1869, Vallejo gave the Mexican land grant Rancho Suscol to his daughter, Epifania Guadalupe Vallejo, April 3, 1851, as a wedding present, when she married General John B. Frisbie.

== Family ==
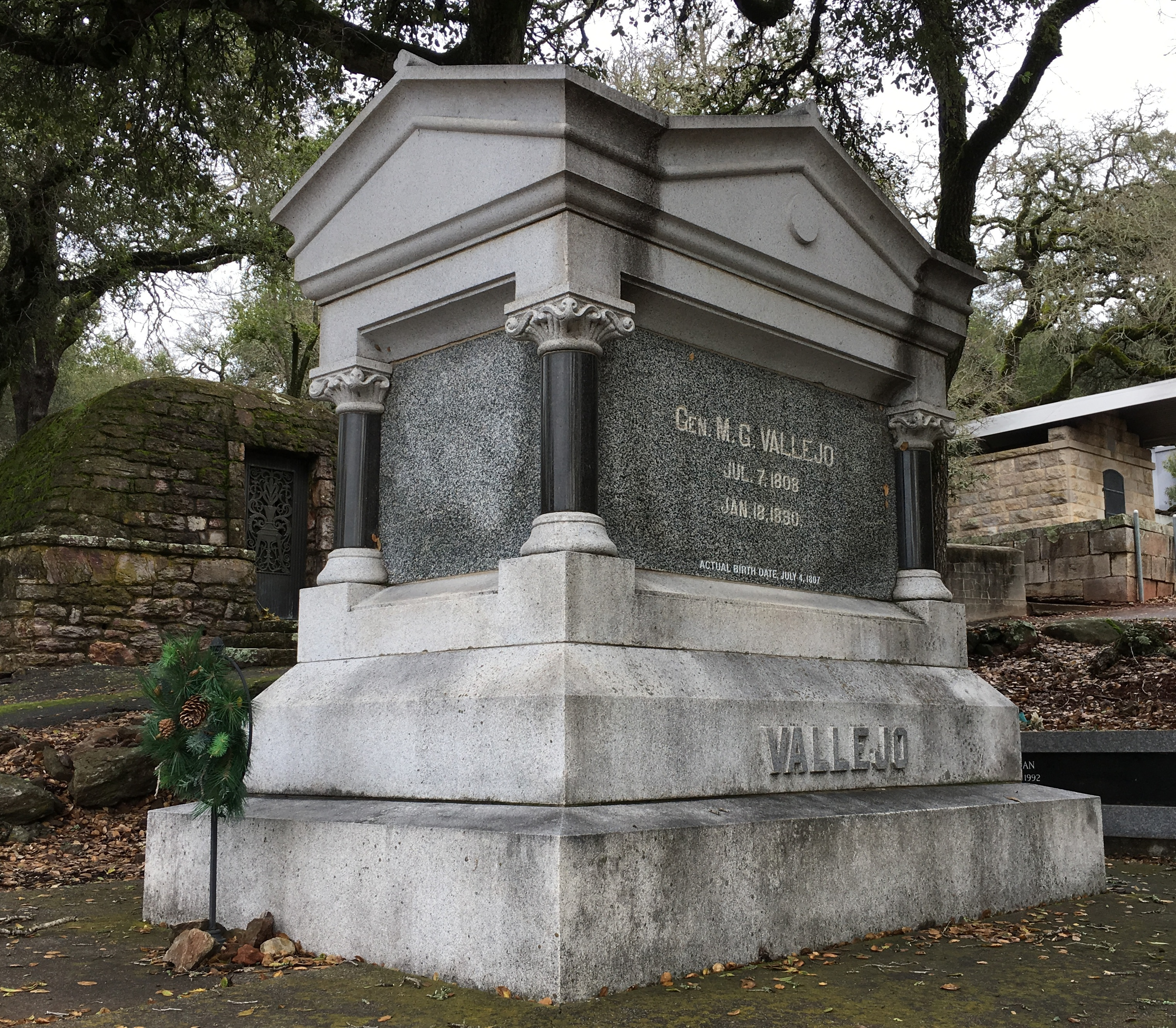
General Vallejo's mausoleum, at the cemetery he established in Sonoma

Jose Manuel Salvador Vallejo, the General's younger brother, received his commission in the Mexican army in 1835, and was appointed Captain of militia at Sonoma in 1836. In 1838 he was grantee of Rancho Napa; in 1839 of Salvador's Ranch, and in 1844 he and his brother Antonio Juan Vallejo (1816–1857) were grantees of Rancho Lupyomi. Salvador Vallejo also claimed Rancho Yajome. In 1863 he was commissioned a Major in the Union Army by Governor Stanford. Major Vallejo organized the 1st Battalion of Native Cavalry, California Volunteers, and he served as far east as Arizona, but did not have a battlefield role in the Civil War. He resigned in 1865 after the war and returned to his ranch in Napa.

Encarnacion Vallejo, the General's sister, married John B.R. Cooper, who was the grantee of Rancho Nicasio and other properties. María Paula Rosalia Vallejo, the General's sister, married Jacob P. Leese grantee of Rancho Huichica and other properties. José de Jesús Vallejo, the General's elder brother, was the grantee of Rancho Arroyo de la Alameda. María Isidora Vallejo, the General's sister, married Mariano de Jesús Soberanes. Their daughter María Ygnacia Soberanes married Dr. Edward Turner Bale grantee of Rancho Carne Humana.

On March 6, 1832, Mariano Vallejo married Francisca Benicia Carrillo in the Chapel of the Presidio of San Diego. Francisca, born August 23, 1815, in San Diego, was one of twelve children of Joaquin Carrillo and María Ygnacia López. The Carrillo family of California was one of the leading families in San Diego. When Vallejo settled in Sonoma, his widowed mother-in-law, María Ygnacia López de Carrillo, was granted the nearby Rancho Cabeza de Santa Rosa in what is now Santa Rosa, California, and settled there with her children.

Vallejo later in life

By the time of his death on January 18, 1890, Vallejo led a modest lifestyle on the last vestige of his once vast landholdings at his Lachryma Montis home in Sonoma, California. A few days after the first anniversary of her husband's death, Francisca Benicia Carrillo de Vallejo died on January 30, 1891. He is interred at the Mountain Cemetery in Sonoma.

== Legacy ==
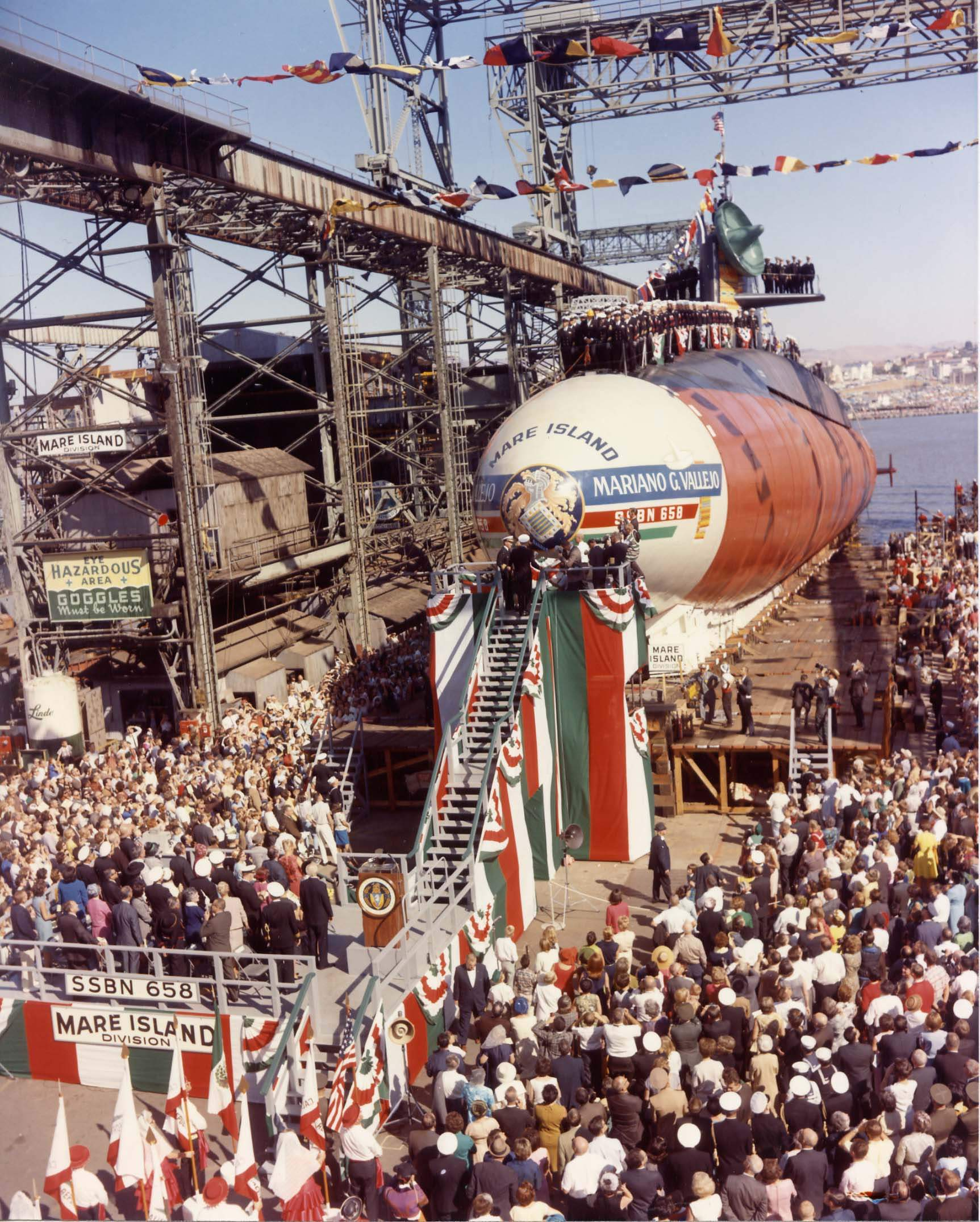
The 1965 launch of the USS Mariano G. Vallejo submarine at the Mare Island Naval Shipyard in Vallejo, California

The city of Vallejo, California, founded by his son-in-law, and the U.S. Navy submarine USS Mariano G. Vallejo (SSBN-658) were named in his honor. Vallejo's Rancho Petaluma Adobe is now preserved in the Petaluma Adobe State Historic Park as a National Historic Landmark. His home in Sonoma, California, where he and his wife lived for more than 35 years, now serves as a museum and cultural center as part of the Sonoma State Historic Park.

A "life-size bronze likeness of" General Vallejo "sitting on a bench," sculpted by Jim Callahan, was unveiled at Sonoma Plaza in June 2017, with a plaque describing in English and Spanish the many roles Vallejo played as a Spanish, Mexican, and American leader.

Actor George J. Lewis was cast as General Vallejo in the 1956 episode "The Bear Flag," on the syndicated television anthology series Death Valley Days, hosted by Stanley Andrews. The segment focused on the conflict between newly arrived Americans and the old Spanish families of California. Robert Tafur played Don Miguel Ruiz, and Don C. Harvey was cast as Ezekiel "Stuttering Zeke" Merritt, who proceeds with plans for the Bear Flag Revolt.

Vallejo, and the city of Sonoma, are the subjects of the opera The Dreamers by David Conte and Philip Littell.

His great-granddaughter was actress Natalie Kingston.

== Children ==
The children of Mariano G. Vallejo and Francisca B. Vallejo (1815–1891)
Name	Birth/Death	Married	Notes
Andronico Antonio Vallejo	1833–1834		
Andronico Antonio Vallejo	1834–1897	Never married	
Epifania de Guadalupe Vallejo	1835–1905	April 3, 1851; John B. Frisbie (1823–1909)	
Adelayda Vallejo	1837–1895	July 26, 1858; Levi Cornell Frisbie (1821–1892)	
Natalia Veneranda Vallejo	1838–1913	June 1, 1863; Attila Haraszthy (1834–1886)	
Plutarco Vallejo	Died: Age two		
Platon Mariano Guadalupe Vallejo	1841–1925	June 5, 1885; Lily Wiley (1849–1867)	
Guadalupe Vallejo	Died: Age four		
Jovita Francisca Vallejo	1844–1878	June 1, 1863; Arpad Haraszthy (1840–1900)	
Uladislao Vallejo	1845 – Unknown	c. 1890; Maria ?	
Plutarco Vallejo	Died: three months		
Benicia Vallejo	1849–1853		
Napoleon Primo Vallejo	1850–1923	Married: 1875; Divorced: 1890; Remarried: 1911 Martha Brown (1854–1917); Married: 1891; Kate Leigh Stokes (died 1911)	
Benicia Vallejo	1854–1861		
Luisa Eugenia Vallejo	1856–1943	August 23, 1882; Ricardo de Emparán(1852–1902)	
María Ignacia Vallejo	1857–1932	May 12, 1878; James Harry Cutter (died 1925)	

== Bibliography ==
- Myrtle Mason McKittrick (1944). Vallejo, Son of California. Binfords & Mort. This book deals mainly with the Mexican period in General Vallejo's life.
- Alan Rosenus (1999). General Vallejo and the Advent of the Americans. Heyday. ISBN 978-1-890771-21-8. This book deals mainly with the American period in General Vallejo's life.
- Madie Brown Emparan, The Vallejos of California, 1968 Contains twelve brief biographies of General Vallejo, his wife Benicia, and each of ten surviving children.
- Milliken, Randall (1995-07-31). A Time of Little Choice: The Disintegration of Tribal Culture in the San Francisco Bay Area 1769-1910. Menlo Park, CA: Ballena Press Publication. ISBN 978-0879191313.
