= Rancho Petaluma =

Mexican land grant in California

Coordinates: 38.25°N 122.58°W

Rancho Petaluma was a 66,622-acre (269.61 km^{2}) Mexican land grant in present-day Sonoma County, California given in 1834 by Governor José Figueroa to Mariano Guadalupe Vallejo. Rancho Petaluma stretched from Petaluma River on the west over the hills and down to Sonoma Creek on the east, including all land that lay between these two waterways from the edge of San Francisco Bay to approximately the present site of Glen Ellen. The rancho included present-day Petaluma and Lakeville.

== History ==
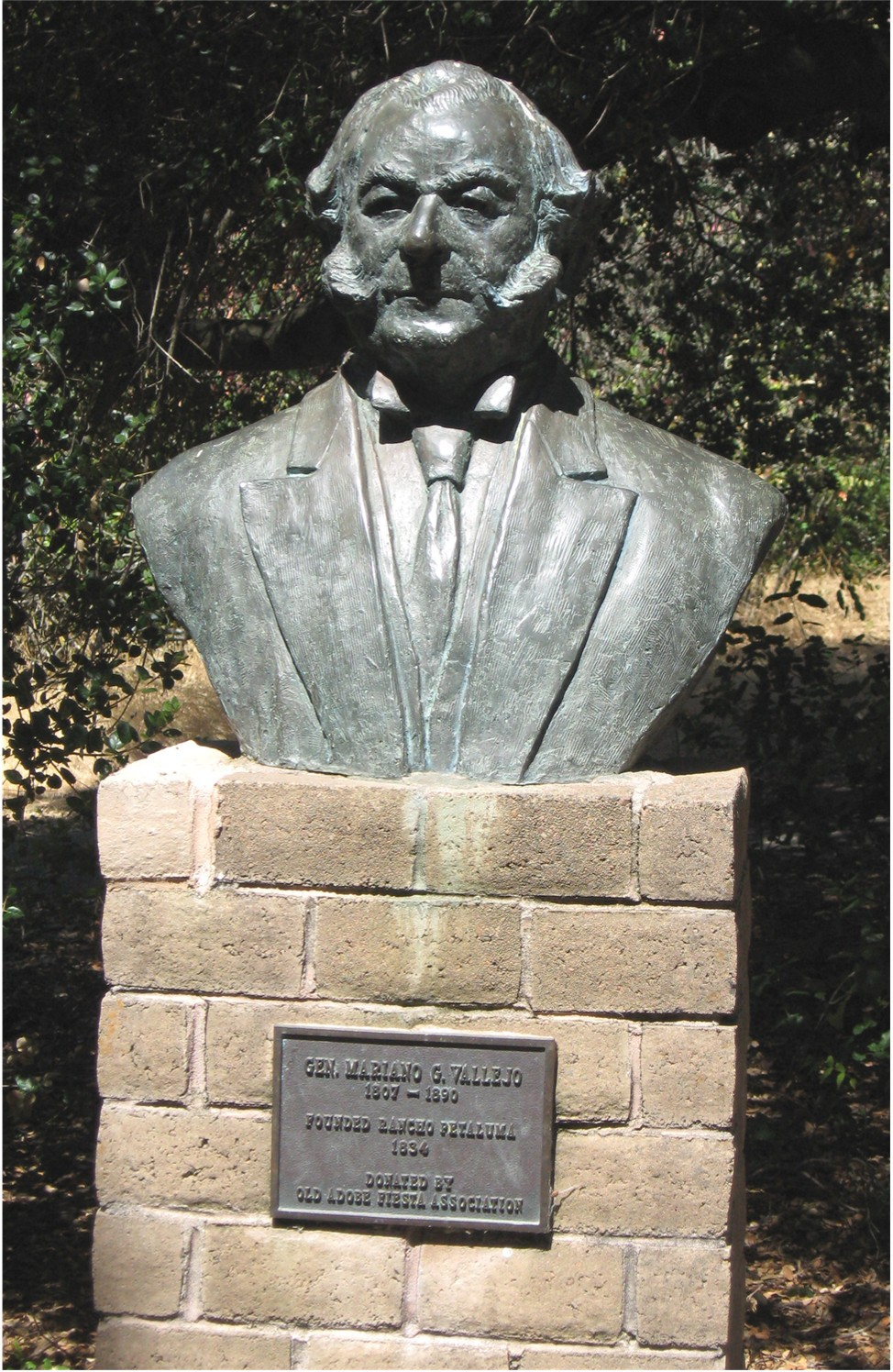
The Bust of General Mariano G. Vallejo at Rancho Petaluma Adobe, erected in 1975.

In 1833, Lieutenant Vallejo was ordered by Governor Figueroa to examine the country north of Mission San Rafael, and to visit Fort Ross and Bodega Bay. On his way to Fort Ross, Vallejo crossed the fertile valley of Petaluma. Later, he built a small house and a corral, and in the spring he was ready to petition for a grant of land where he could place his livestock. The land grant was approved by Governor Figueroa in June 1834. Governor Figueroa gave Vallejo vastly increased powers; his title was Military Commander and Director of Colonization of the Northern Frontier, and he was specifically requested to take charge of the mission at Sonoma, reduce it to the status of a parish church, free the Indian workers, and distribute the mission lands and other assets among the population at large. The ten square league (approximately 44,000 acres (178 km^{2})) grant was confirmed by Governor Manuel Micheltorena and increased by five square leagues (approximately 22,000 acres (89 km^{2})) in 1843. Although Vallejo's rancho was centered on Petaluma, he made his home in Sonoma.

With the cession of California to the United States following the Mexican–American War, the 1848 Treaty of Guadalupe Hidalgo provided that the land grants would be honored. As required by the Land Act of 1851, a claim for Rancho Petaluma was filed with the Public Land Commission in 1852, and the grant was patented to Mariano G. Vallejo in 1874 (patent No. 49). James H. Watmough, purser on the USS Portsmouth, bought land from Vallejo in 1847. In 1853 Watmough was an unsuccessful claimant for a one square mile (640 acres (3 km^{2})) part of Rancho Petaluma.

As settlers made their way into Sonoma County in the mid-1850s, Vallejo subdivided and sold most of the rancho. In 1864, Vallejo sold the last remaining 1,450 acres (6 km^{2}) of the original Rancho Petaluma to San Francisco banker Alfred Borel.

== Historic sites of the Rancho ==
- Rancho Petaluma Adobe historic adobe ranch house owned and constructed by Vallejo.
- Jack London State Historic Park
