= Rancho Suscol =

Mexican land grant in California

Coordinates: 38.22°N 122.38°W

Rancho Suscol was an 84,000-acre (340 km^{2}) Mexican land grant in present day Sonoma County, California, Napa County, California, and Solano County, California, given in 1843 by Governor Manuel Micheltorena to General Mariano Guadalupe Vallejo. In a significant land law decision, the land claim was rejected by the US Supreme Court in 1862. Rancho Suscol extended from Rancho Petaluma on the west, south down to the San Francisco Bay and Mare Island and Carquinez Strait, and then to Rancho Suisun on the east. It included present day cities of Vallejo and Benicia.

== History ==
In 1835, the Mexican Government gave Mariano Guadalupe Vallejo control of some newly secularized land. The Rancho Nacional Suscol was a national ranch under his control, heavily stocked with cattle and horses. Aiding Vallejo in various battles in exchange for cattle and other goods, Patwin populated this land living along the banks of Suscol Creek.

In March, 1843 Vallejo paid the government $5,000 for the support of the governor's troops and in return he was granted the 18 leagues Rancho Suscol by Mexican governor Micheltorena. Vallejo also received a confirming document (later considered to be a forgery by the US Supreme Court) signed by Pio Pico in 1845.

With the cession of California to the United States following the Mexican–American War, the 1848 Treaty of Guadalupe Hidalgo provided that the land grants would be honored. As required by the Land Act of 1851, a claim for Rancho Suscol was filed with the Public Land Commission in 1853. The land grant was confirmed by the Land Commission and on appeal by the District Court, but rejected by the US Supreme Court in 1862 on want of authority in the Mexican government to make it.

As the grant was rejected, there is no official area of the grant. The grant was for approximately 18 square leagues, and the area discussed in the Supreme Court documents is 84,000 acres (340 km^{2}). Vallejo sold Rancho Suscol to his son-in-law, John B. Frisbie, who was married to Vallejo's oldest daughter, Epifania, (also known as Fannie). Frisbie sold portions of the tract to San Francisco investors who were primarily interested in speculating on the growth of Benicia, Vallejo and the Mare Island Naval Shipyard. When the grant was rejected, the land immediately became public domain under the California Land Act of 1851, and available for homesteaders. Within a year more than 250 people claimed 160-acre (0.65 km^{2}) plots in accordance with federal homestead law.

== The Suscol Act ==
When the Supreme Court rejected the claim in 1862, Frisbie tried to persuade Congress to pass a law allowing claimants under a rejected grant to pre-empt their property at $1.25 per acre - without limitation regarding acreage. Under the Pre-emption Act of 1841, owners were allowed to "pre-empt" their portions of the grant, and acquire title for $1.25 an acre - up to a maximum of 160 acres (0.6 km^{2}). Although Frisbie failed to get the legislation through Congress in 1862, he was successful a year later (the new version of the legislation applied only to landholders within the boundaries of Rancho Suscol), and the Suscol Act became law in 1863. However the intervening years gave the homesteaders time to establish their claims based on the Pre-emption Act of 1841. Some minor violence occurred, but both sides turned to the courts. Homesteader Whitney filed a lawsuit to compel Frisbie to convey the disputed land to him. The Supreme Court ruled for Frisbie, and the homesteaders were evicted.
