= William Lyman =

William Lyman may refer to:

- William Lyman (politician) (1755–1811), U.S. congressman from Massachusetts
- William Lyman (inventor) (1821–1891), American inventor of a rotating-wheel can opener
- William Whittingham Lyman (1850–1921), American winemaker in California
- William Whittingham Lyman Jr. (1885–1983), American academic and Celtic scholar
- William Denison Lyman (1852–1920), American author, professor, and historian
- Link Lyman (William Roy Lyman, 1898–1972), American football player
- Will Lyman (born 1948), American actor

== See also ==
- Willy Loman, protagonist of the play Death of a Salesman
