= Frank Happersberger =

American sculptor

Frank H. Happersberger
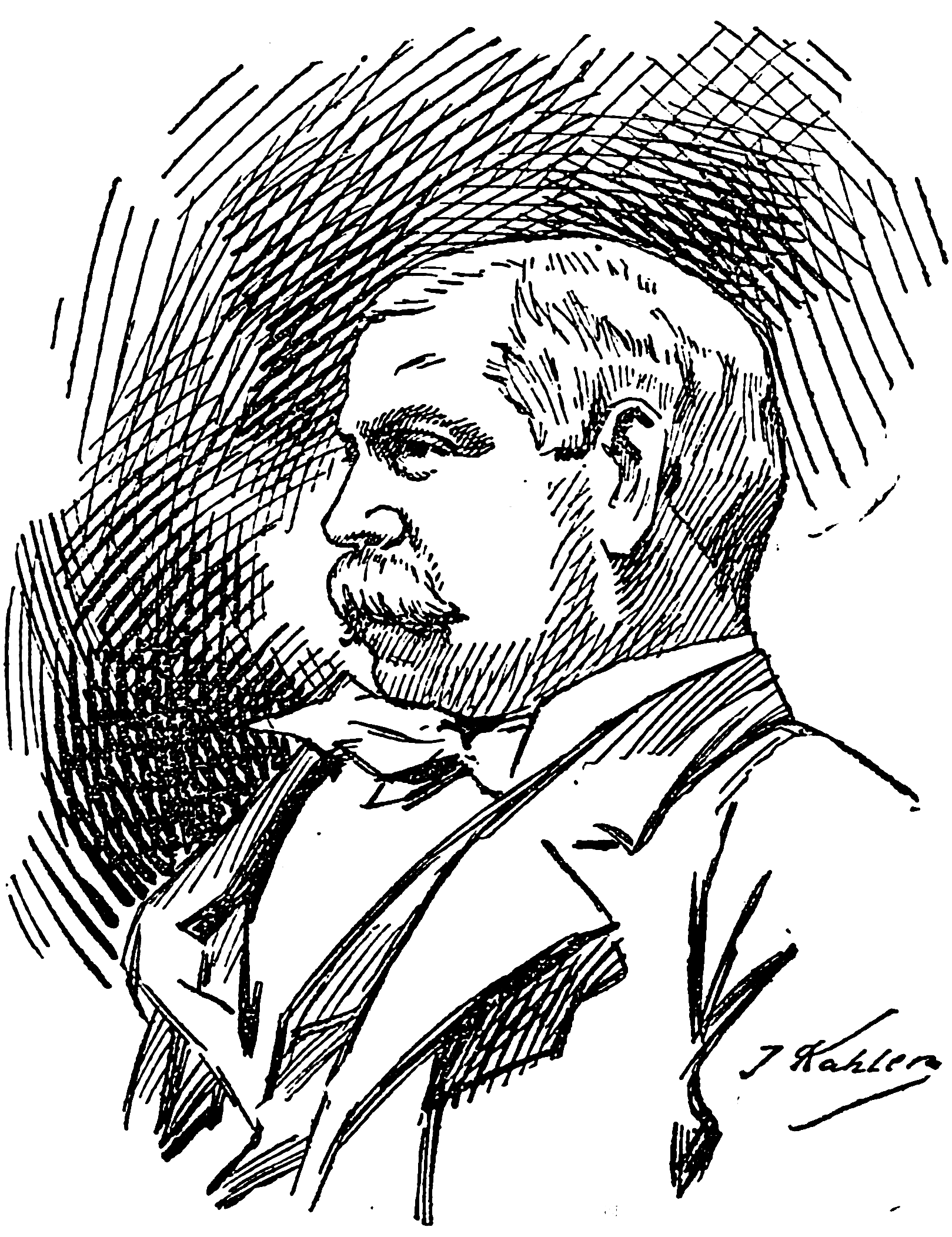
- 1894 sketch in the San Francisco Call
- Born: December 1859; Placer County, California
- Died: 11 October 1932; San Anselmo, California
- Known for: Marble and Bronze Sculpture

Frank H. Happersberger (1859–1932) was an American sculptor based in San Francisco. He received training in a German royal art academy. He is best known for the monument for President James A. Garfield in Golden Gate Park and Pioneer Monument, both in San Francisco.

== Biography ==
Frank Happersberger was born in 1859 in Placer County, California. His's father, Frank Happersberger Sr, was a Bavarian immigrant who moved from New York to San Francisco to join the Gold Rush. In his youth, Frank Jr. worked for the San Francisco firm of Kemp and Hoffman as a wood-carver. For eight years, he studied at a German art academy, and while still in Europe he entered and won a competition to build a monument to the assassinated James A. Garfield. The Garfield sculpture was completed in 1885, and established Happersberger's reputation.

Happersberger established a studio in San Francisco at 51 Park Avenue. In 1894 he completed the Pioneer Monument, also in San Francisco. Happersberger was a member of California Parlor No. 1 of the Native Sons of the Golden West.

=== Personal life ===
Happersberger's wife Evangeline Ballou-Happersberger was the subject of a short 1894 article in the San Francisco Examiner, which described her skill at wood carving. A "wood carving revival" had been a fad out East, and Evangeline learned the skill from her husband. She was happily planning to carve "elaborate beams and panels" for a new house they were building.

In 1899, Happersberger moved to New York, hearing that there was more work for sculptors there. He left Evangeline in San Francisco. She alleged that he had deserted her and sought a divorce, citing "cruelty and failure to provide the necessities of life." The resulting bitter and emotional confrontations between Frank and Evangeline were reported in the Examiner. Their divorce was granted in January 1900.

He died on October 11, 1932, in San Anselmo, California, at age 74.

== Gallery ==
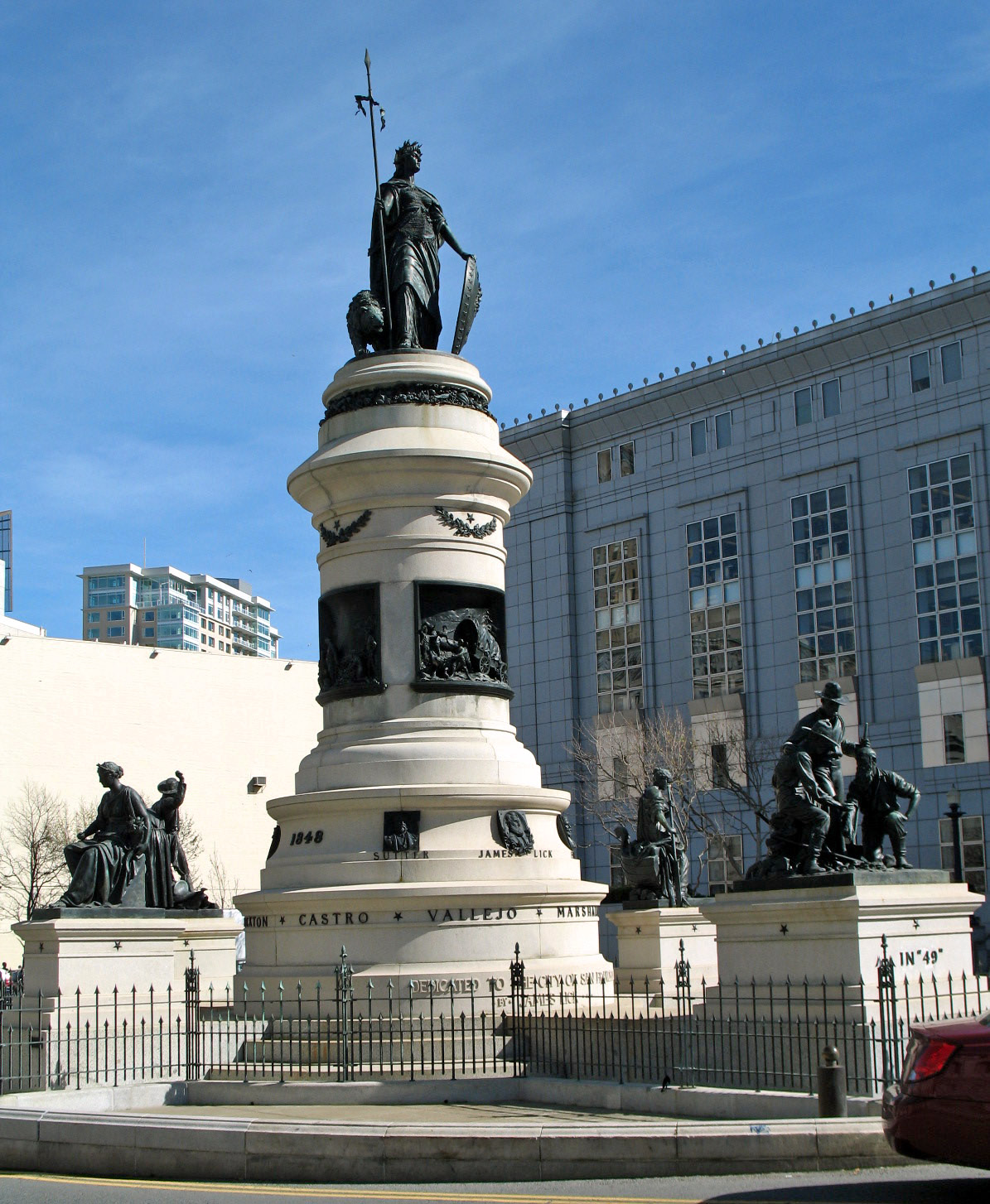
The James Lick/Pioneer Memorial

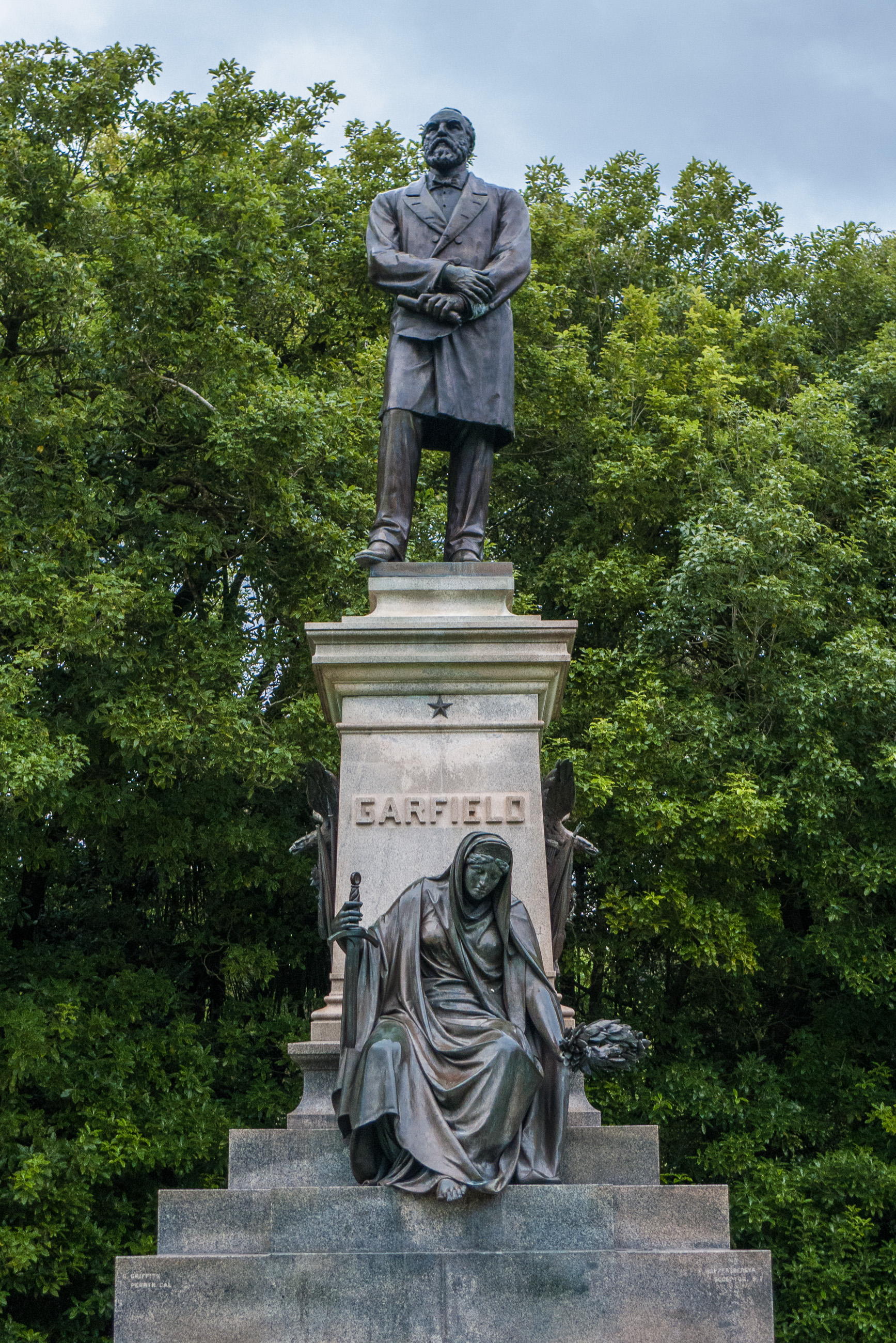
Garfield Monument in Golden Gate Park
