= Pioneer Monument (San Francisco) =

Monument in San Francisco, California, U.S.

Coordinates: 37°46′47″N 122°24′57″W

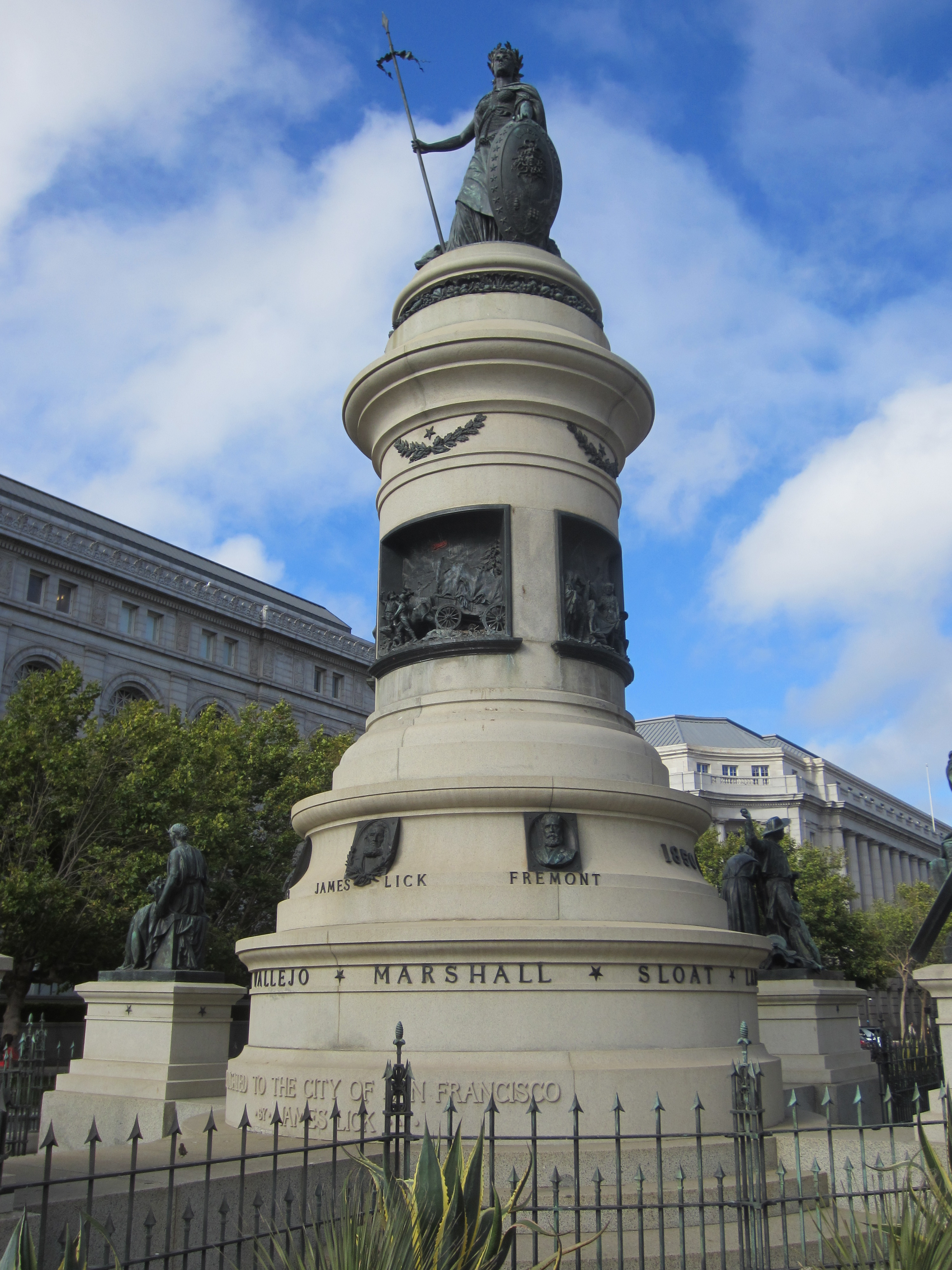
- The monument in 2013
- Interactive map of Pioneer Monument
- Location: Fulton Street between Hyde and Larkin Streets; Civic Center, San Francisco, California
- Designer: Frank Happersberger
- Completion date: 1894

The Pioneer Monument is a granite monument supporting bronze figures and reliefs created by Frank Happersberger and financed by the estate of James Lick. It is located on Fulton Street between Hyde and Larkin streets in the Civic Center of San Francisco, California, next to the San Francisco Public Library. It was dedicated on November 29, 1894. A highly controversial component, Early Days, was removed in 2018.

== Description ==
At the top of the monument stands a large female figure of Minerva, the Roman goddess of wisdom and war, alongside a California grizzly bear. Frank Happersberger's goal was to represent California's motto "Eureka" meaning "I have found it." His inspiration for Minerva as the female centerpiece of his monument came from the Statue of Liberty which was brought to the US in 1886. Minerva stands on a column, whose base is lined with medallions representing figures from the history of California: Francis Drake, John Sutter, John Fremont, Father Junipero Serra, and the monument's benefactor, James Lick.

Four additional statues stand on piers surrounding the central column, each facing a cardinal direction. Two are female figures allegorically representing Commerce and Plenty. One statue, which is titled "In 49'", commemorates the California Gold Rush. The last, titled Early Days, contains a missionary, a Native American, and a vaquero. Early Days was removed from the monument in September 2018.

=== Individual sculptures ===
==== Commerce ====
Commerce is located on the South facing pier of the monument. This female figure's significance is shown through the oar she holds in her hands. This oar is a symbol of the shipping trade in California in the late 1880s. At this time, the California coast was dependent on the fishing, whaling, shipping, and transportation businesses that operated out of the surrounding waterway. Commerce represents the significance of the shipping businesses which operated out of San Francisco beginning in the 1800s.

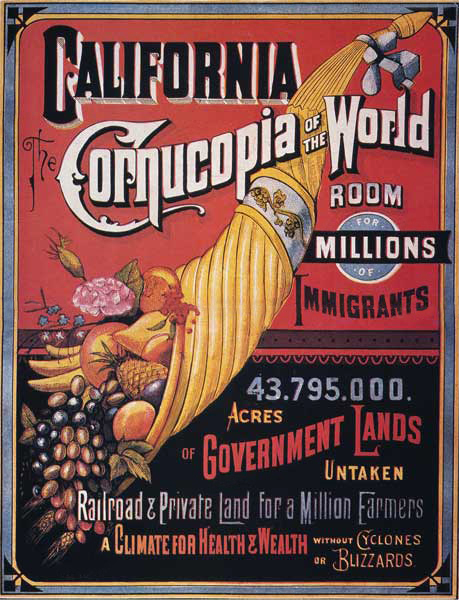
"California Cornucopia of the World"

==== Plenty ====
Plenty is located on the North Pier. Dating back to Greek and Roman mythology, the full cornucopia she holds in her left hand is a symbol of good fortune. In the late 19th century, California used the cornucopia in advertisements to get new immigrants to come to the state. In Happersberger's monument, Plenty represents the potential of starting a new life in California.

==== In "49" ====
The three gold miners from In "49" represent the California Gold Rush. They lead the other figures from the monument by virtue of their position in front of Minerva. Originally, James Lick had wanted the statue to be led by Commerce or Plenty to represent the importance of agriculture in the development of California. It was later decided by Happersberger that "In '49'" was a more appropriate leader for the monument because it was metal that drove pioneers to the "Golden State" (i.e. California) rather than agricultural opportunities. The three men were modeled after James Marshall, who was an American carpenter and saw mill operator. While Marshall is known for discovering gold in 1848, it is sometimes said that he actually rediscovered it since Washington had been aware of the existence of gold in California since 1843.

==== Early Days ====
The Early Days sculpture shows a Franciscan missionary who is seeking to convert an Indian man. Beside the missionary is a vaquero (cowboy) from the ranches of Mexico. The Spanish Franciscan missionary is Father Junípero Serra, who brought Christianity to California in 1769. John Sutter represents the vaquero who brought capitalism to California, but who also relied heavily on Indigenous labor. Happersberger did not accurately depict the Indigenous people from the region. The man in this sculpture is a Plains Indian, who would have lived in the Great Plains or Canadian Prairies, while native people of the Bay Area were Ohlone.

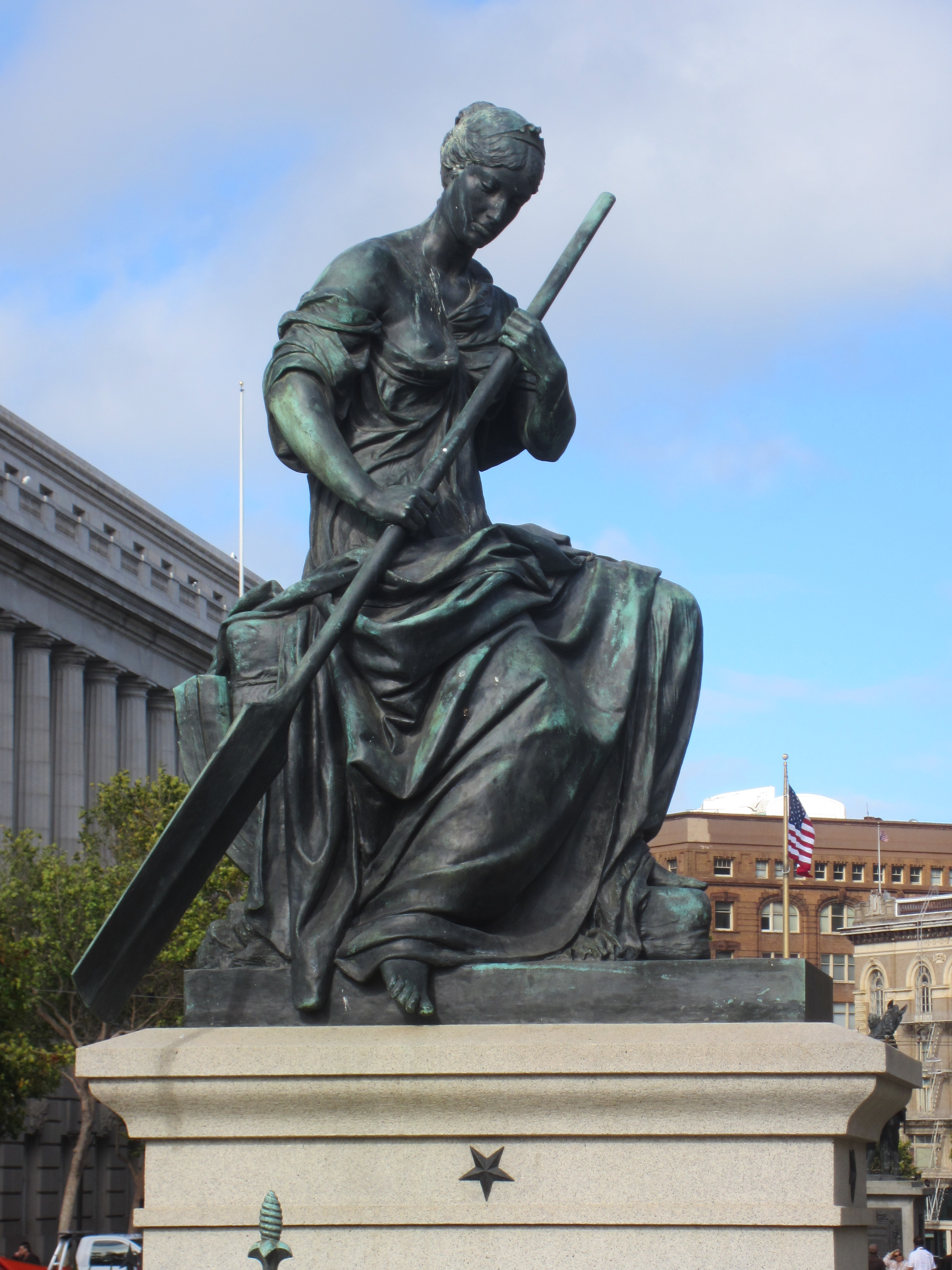
South pier: Commerce

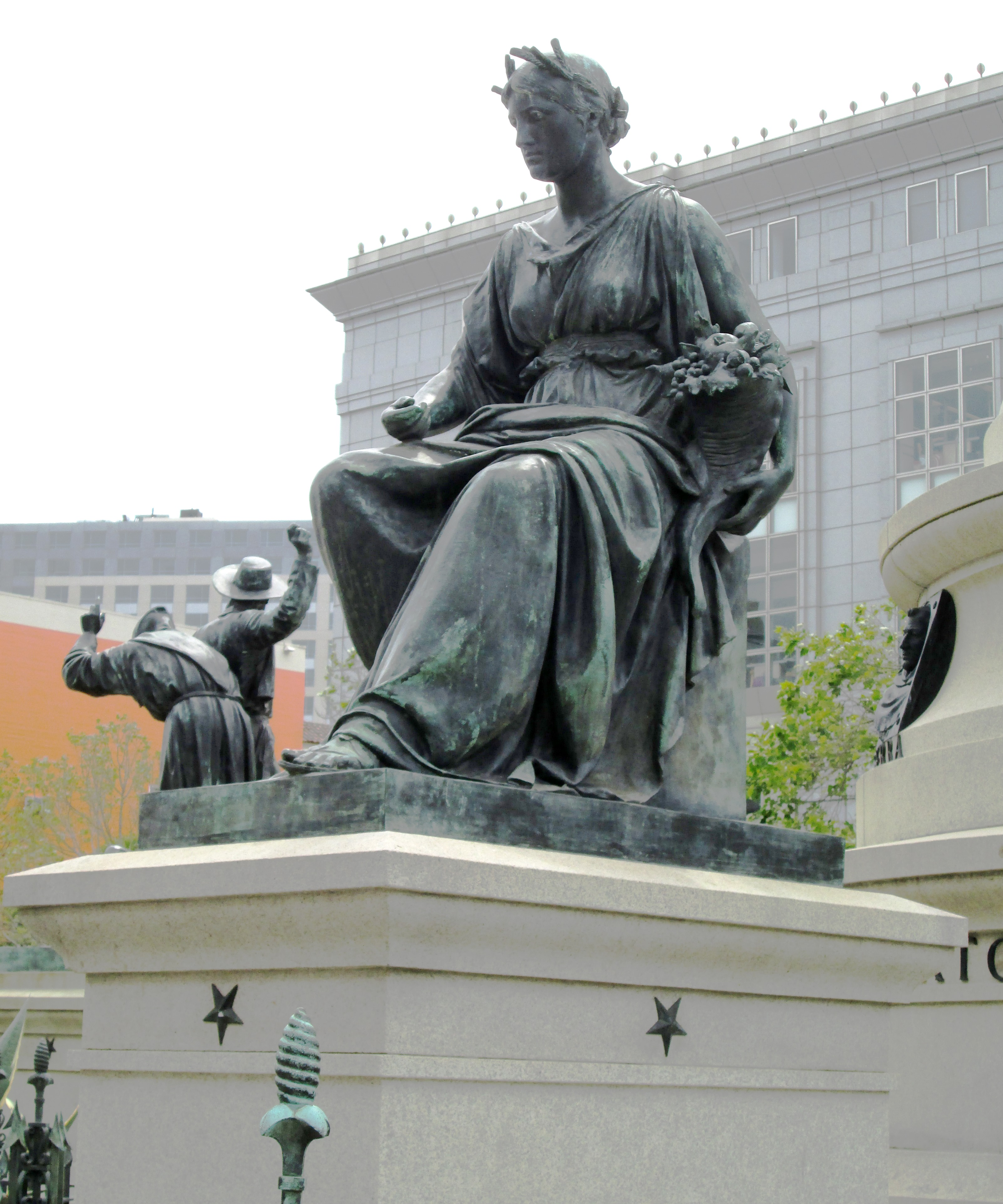
North pier: Plenty

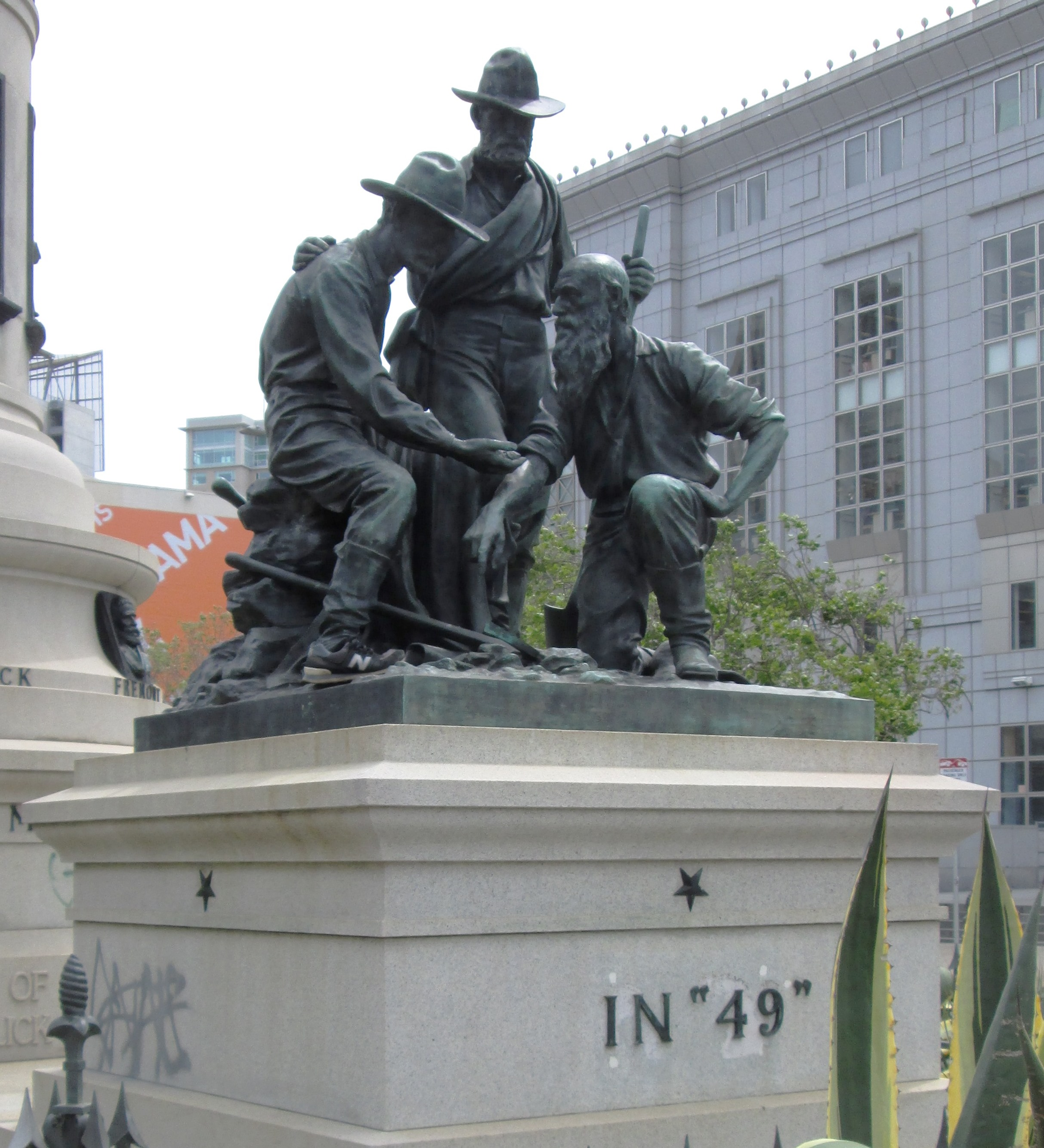
West pier: In "49"

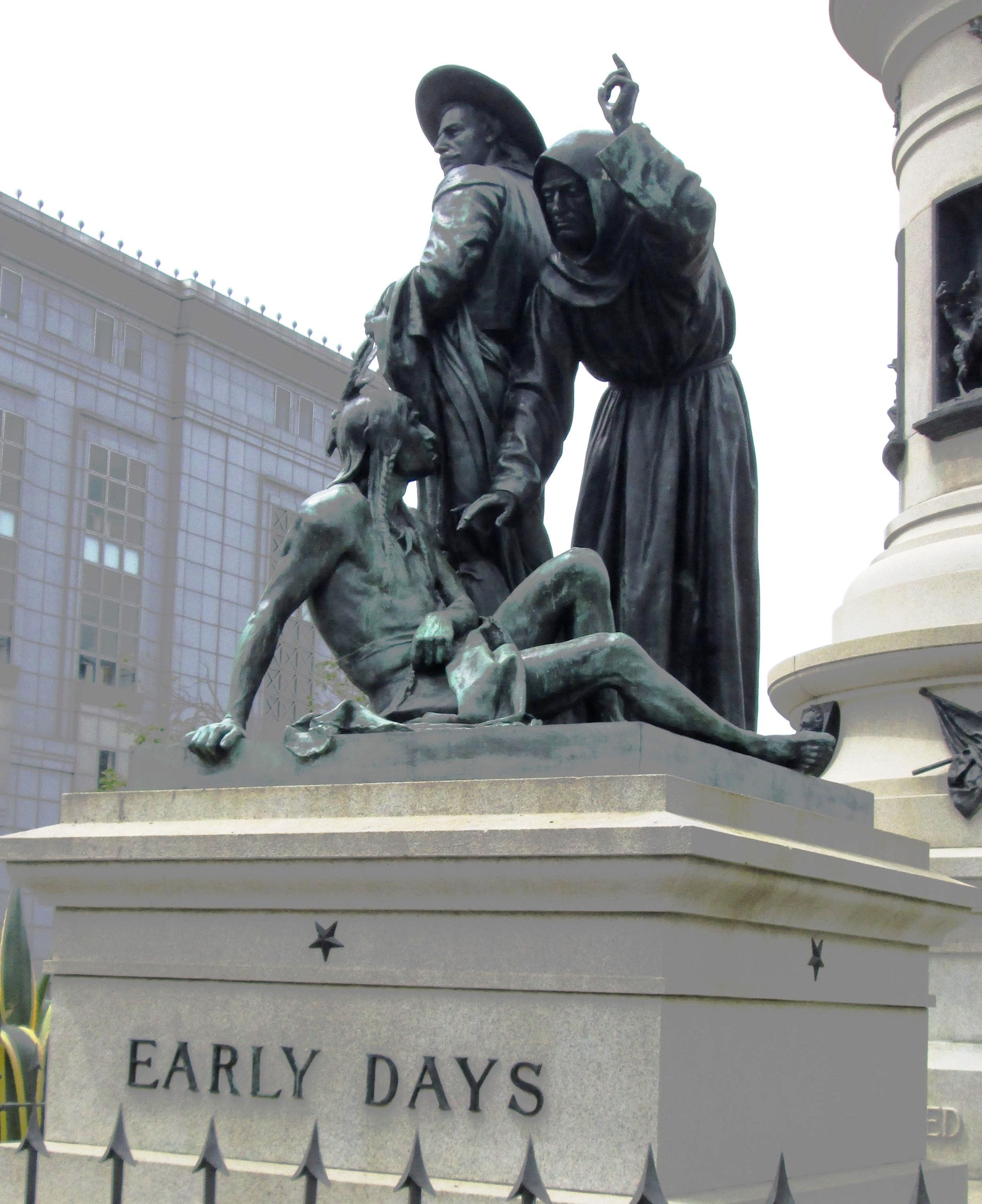
East pier: Early Days, which was removed in September 2018.

== Funding ==
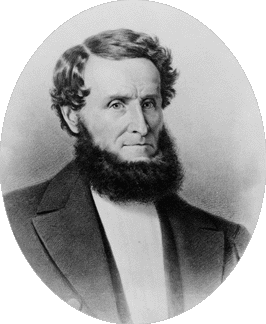
James Lick

James Lick was a Pennsylvania-born philanthropist who did not complete his education but pursued an early career in carpentry. He worked as a piano carpenter in Baltimore, before moving to South America for seventeen years. When he returned to the United States in 1848, he made a fortune by investing and selling real estate in San Francisco during the gold rush. His investments were focused on undeveloped properties in the sand hills of California. In 1873, Lick was seventy-seven years old and decided to start donating his properties and fortune to philanthropic groups in exchange for a tribute to his success. One gift deed, which he left to The Society of California Pioneers, was to be used for a section of land on Fourth Street near Market, where The Pioneer Monument was eventually placed. He left specific conditions for how his donation was to be used, and it was up to his group of trustees to execute his plans.

The trustees of the Lick estate were tasked with implementing the thirteenth clause of the Lick trust, which states:

"And in further trust to erect, under the supervision of said parties of the second part, and their successors, at the City Hall, in the City and County of San Francisco, a group of bronze statuary, well worth one hundred thousand dollars ($100,000), which should represent by appropriate designs and figures the history of California: First, from the early settlement of the missions to the acquisition of California by the United States; second, from such acquisition by the United States to the time when agriculture became the leading interest of the State; third, from the last-named period to the first day of January, one thousand eight hundred and seventy-four."

== History ==
Pioneer monuments were constructed in growing numbers during the late nineteenth century, and they borrowed conventions from the Confederate monuments that were being erected at the same time. In September 1890, the Trustees for the Lick estate selected a model by sculptor Frank Happersberger from a field of four artist submissions and twenty-eight design entries.

Ground was broken in May 1894 at San Francisco City Hall. The cornerstone of the monument was laid and statuary dedicated on Monday, September 10, 1894 by the Lick Trustees, Society of California Pioneers and Native Sons of the Golden West at Marshall Square, near the intersection of Hyde and Grove, in front of the Old City Hall (which was later destroyed by the earthquake of 1906).

In 1991, a plan was introduced to move the statue to make way for a new public library. At the time, the statue was surrounded by a parking lot, seedy pornographic theaters and fast-food restaurants along Market Street. This plan generated conflict between preservationists, who wanted the statue to remain in place to mark the site of Old City Hall, and Native American protestors who wanted the statue removed entirely. The Native American protestors criticized the Early Days sculpture for depicting their people as subservient, for celebrating their subjugation, and for factual inaccuracy (it depicts a Plains Indian, who was not representative of the Indigenous people who lived near what would become San Francisco).

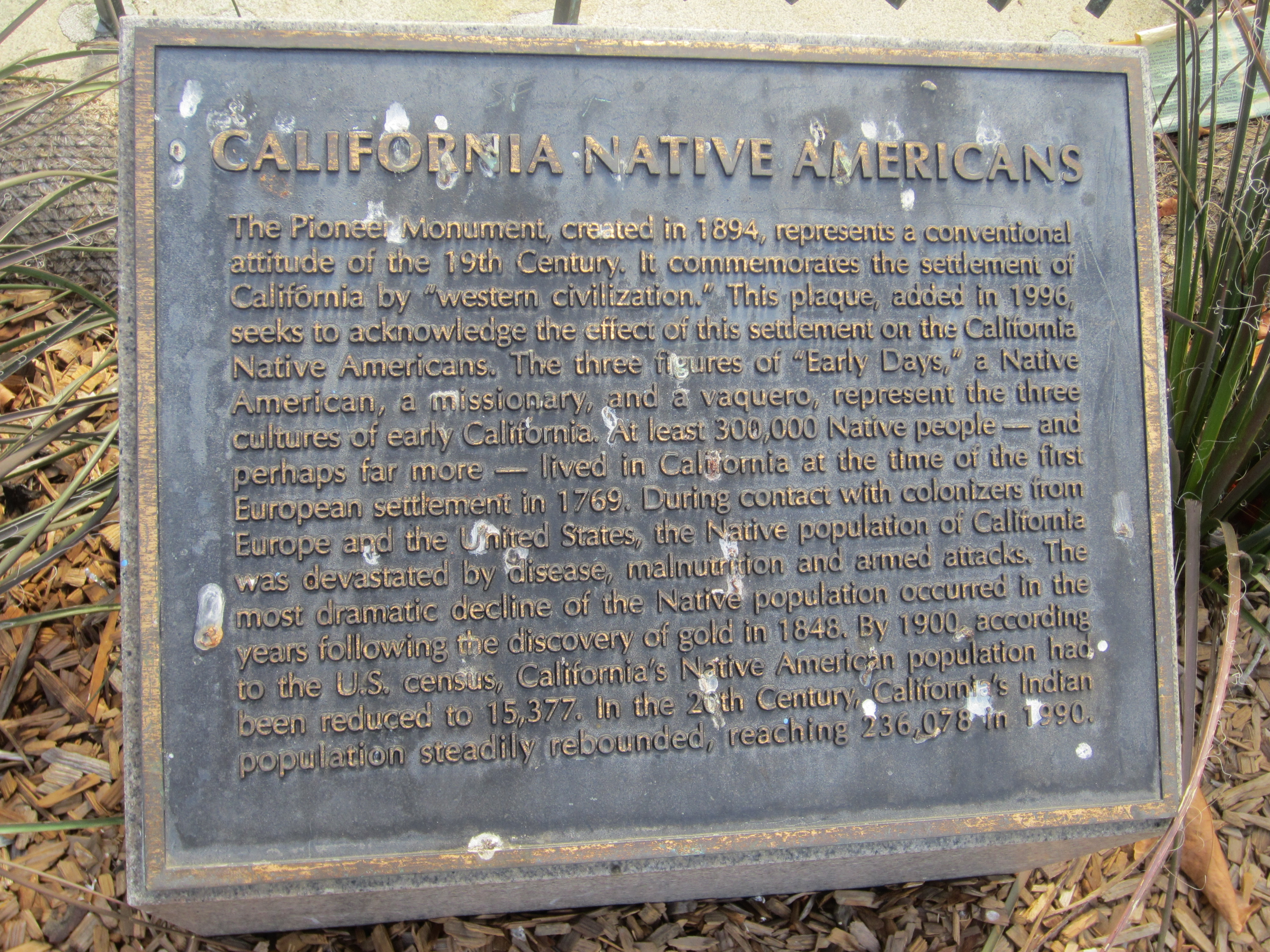
Plaque added in 1994

In 1991, twenty heavy-duty steel carrying beams were used to transport the statue one block to the middle of Fulton Street, where it currently stands between the old and new libraries and across a park from the City Hall.

=== Removal of Early Days ===
A lawsuit challenging its removal was dismissed in 1995, and the dismissal was upheld on appeal. A brass plaque was added to the statue in 1996 to explain the role of Native Americans in California. Further lawsuits and complaints argued that the east-facing sculpture Early Days was dehumanizing to Native Americans and was factually inaccurate. In 2018, city officials reached a unanimous decision to remove Early Days.

Early Days was removed on 14 September 2018, in early morning darkness, and moved to a storage facility.
