= William Whittingham Lyman Jr. =

American poet (1885–1983)

William Whittingham Lyman Jr. (January 3, 1885 – November 8, 1983), also known as Jack Lyman, was an American writer and academic, primarily in the field of Celtic studies.

== Early life and education ==
Lyman was born at Napa County, California, the son of William Whittingham Lyman and Mrs. Sarah A. Nowland, and the grandson of Theodore Benedict Lyman. His father built the Lyman winery, now known as the El Molino winery.

In 1905, while an undergraduate at the University of California, Berkeley, he was convinced by Charles Mills Gayley to achieve an academic major in English literature. Upon completion of his Master's degree, Gayley arranged for him to receive a university fellowship to travel to the University of Oxford to study Celtic languages with Sir John Rhys. After a year at Oxford, Lyman spent two years at Harvard University studying the Irish language.

== Career ==
He returned to the University of California, Berkeley, to take up a post as Instructor in Celtic (then a tenure-track position) within the English department in 1911–1912. In the same year, Celtic appears on the list of approved majors in the University of California, Berkeley College of Letters and Science; in the following year, Lyman is named also as "Graduate Adviser" in Celtic.

There he remained until 1922, whereupon he moved to Southern California and taught English at Los Angeles City College until his retirement.

Commenting on his long life, Ruth Witt-Diamant declared him to be the "oldest living poet".

He was a poet of some renown, as mentioned by Josephine Miles: "In a legendary time in the Greek Theater in Berkeley at the end of the First World War, poets gathered around the visitor Witter Bynner with a great sense of inventiveness and praise. Names I have heard from that time were Genevieve Taggard, Hidegarde Flanner, Eda Lou Walton, David Greenhood, Jack Lyman."

== Personal life ==
On January 1, 1921, he married the poet Helen Hoyt.

After retirement, he and his family moved back to the family home near the Bale Grist Mill, north of St. Helena.

== Publications ==
=== As editor ===
- (With Dudley Chadwick Gordon and Vernon Rupert King). Today's Literature: An Omnibus of Short Stories, Novelettes, Poems, Plays, Profiles, and Essays. New York: American Book Company. 1935. ISBN 0-8486-6628-3

=== As author ===
- Figs from California. Berkeley: Lederer, Street and Zeus. 1922.
- California Wild Flowers in Verse and Picture. Los Angeles: Lymanhouse. 1939.
- Poems in Three Moods. Los Angeles: College Press. 1948.
- The Lyman Family (Gleanings). Napa County Historical Society. 1980.

=== Unpublished memoirs ===
His typescript memoirs are held at the University of California, Berkeley, Bancroft Library and contain comments on many of his faculty colleagues as well as the circumstances of his departure from the university.

== See also ==
- List of American poets
- List of Harvard University alumni
- List of Los Angeles City College people
- List of University of California, Berkeley alumni
- List of University of California, Berkeley faculty
- List of University of Oxford people
