= Bothe-Napa Valley State Park =

State park of California, USA, preserving forested land in Napa Valley

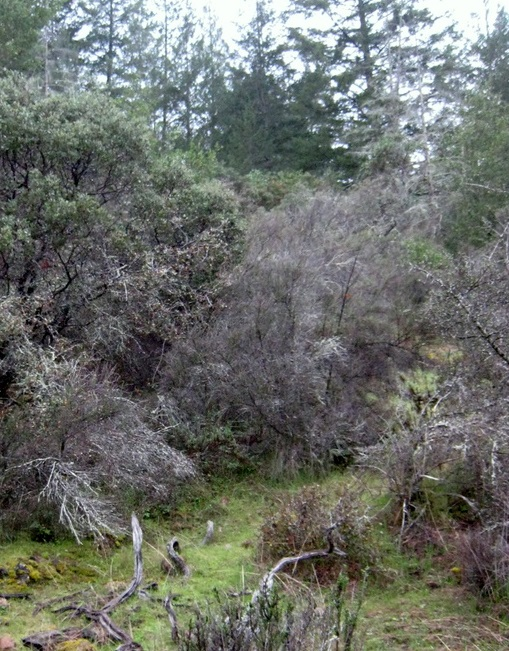

- Location within California Location within the United States
- Location: Napa and Sonoma Counties, California, United States
- Nearest city: St. Helena, California
- Coordinates: 38°33′4″N 122°30′58″W
- Area: 1,991 acres (806 ha)
- Established: 1960
- Governing body: California Department of Parks and Recreation

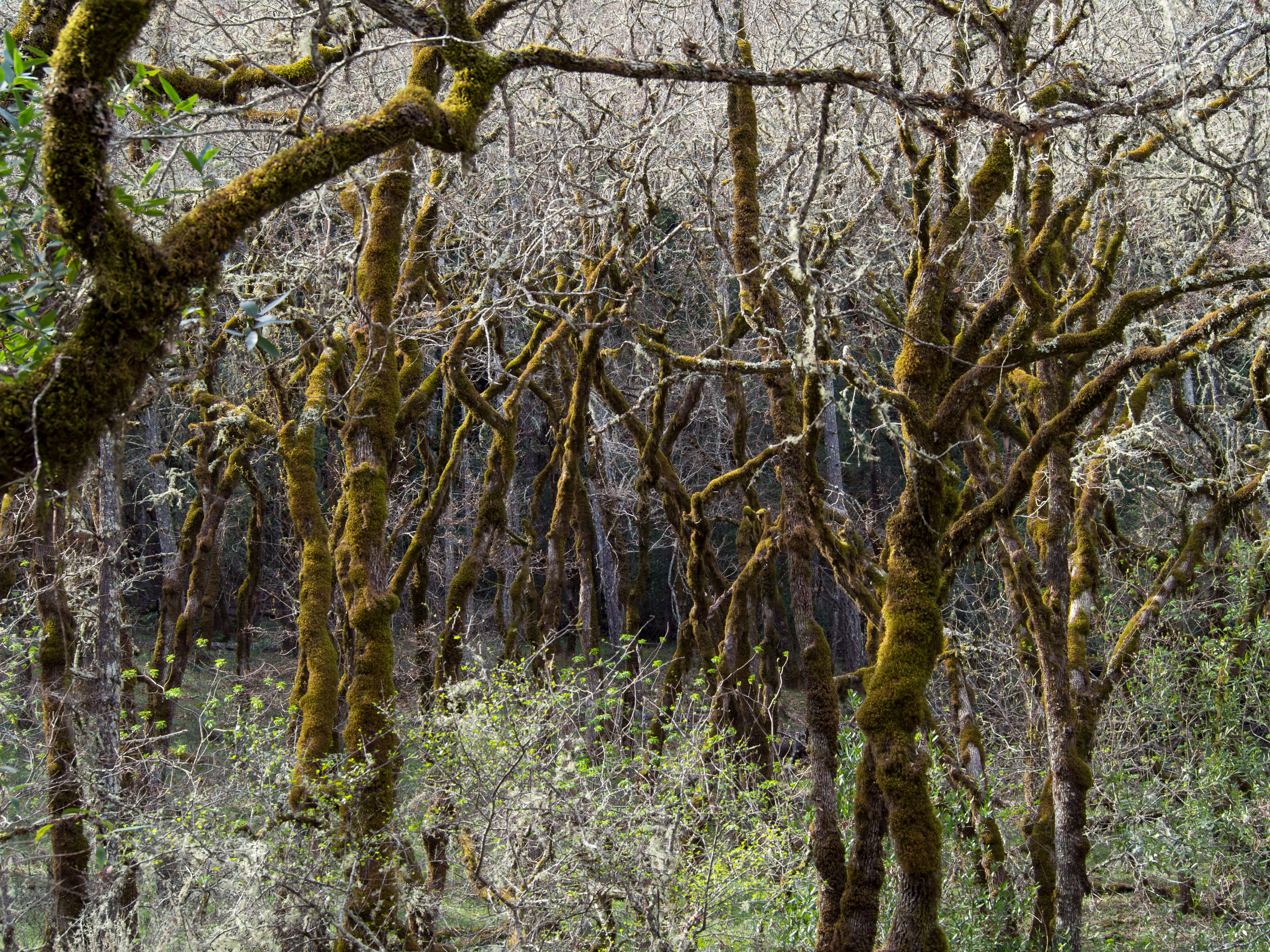
Moss-covered blue oak trees in the Bothe-Napa Valley State Park

Bothe-Napa Valley State Park is a state park of California in the United States. Located in the Napa Valley, it contains the farthest inland coast redwoods in a California state park. The 1,991-acre (806 ha) park was established in 1960.

In 2011 during the California budget crisis, this park and the adjacent Bale Grist Mill State Historic Park were among those targeted to be closed due to lack of funding. The Napa County Parks and Open Space District petitioned the state to operate the park in order to avoid closure.

== History ==
The park property was originally part of the Rancho Carne Humana Mexican land grant.

== See also ==
- List of California state parks
