= Leroy Milton Grider =

American politician

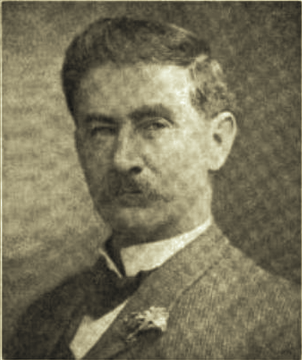
- Grider in 1918

Member of the Los Angeles City Council from the 6th ward
- In office December 16, 1896 – December 15, 1898
- Preceded by: George D. Pessell
- Succeeded by: George D. Pessell

Personal details
- Born: September 22, 1854 California
- Died: November 16, 1919 (aged 65) Los Angeles, California
- Party: Democratic

Leroy Milton Grider (September 22, 1854 – November 16, 1919) was a pioneer land developer in Los Angeles County, California in the late 19th and early 20th centuries. He was said to be the originator of the excursion method of selling residential lots. He was also a Los Angeles City Council member and a businessman known for establishing a noted pet store in that city. He was the target of a publicized but unsuccessful suit by his wife for a legal separation in 1914.

== Vocation ==
Excursion advertisement for the Gower tract in Hollywood, 1905

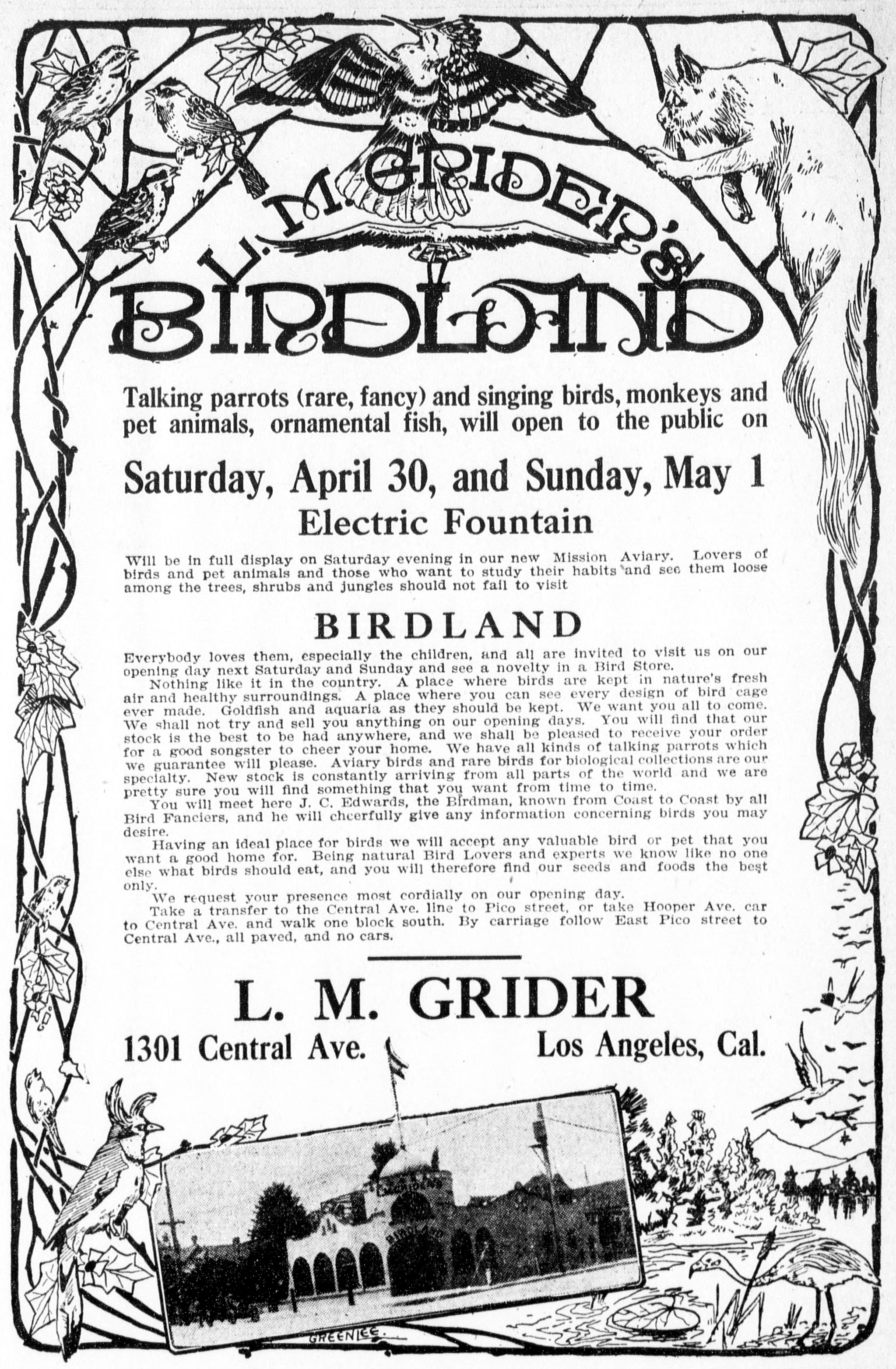
Advertisement for Birdland, 1910

Grider first opened a real estate office in Downey and then moved to a space in Los Angeles at First and Main Streets. He "was said to be the first real estate man in the city to use the excursion method of selling lots," and he eventually opened and sold property in 26 subdivisions, including Sunnyside, Bell, Floral Park, Grant Place, Lomita Park and Manchester Heights, often by "giving old-fashioned Spanish barbecues on the sites." (Note: "Services Tomorrow for Realty Pioneer". Los Angeles Times. 1919-11-18. p. 7. Archived from the original on 2022-06-07.)

A Democrat, Grider ran for Los Angeles County assessor or recorder in 1890, and he was a Los Angeles City Council member in 1896–1898; he was also a fire commissioner. He was a member of the Native Sons of the Golden West and the Knights of Pythias. According to the Los Angeles Times, "he established the business in this city known as Birdland, where birds of all kinds and descriptions, as well as other kinds of pets, were on sale and exhibition." (Note: "Pioneer Is Called". Los Angeles Times. 1919-11-17. p. 2. Archived from the original on 2022-06-07.) It was the largest bird store in Los Angeles.

== Personal ==
=== Early ===
Grider's parents, Tobias S. and Eleanor Grider, came to California in 1851 over the Santa Fe Trail, and Leroy was born on September 22, 1854. The family moved to Los Angeles in 1854 or 1857 and it was there that Grider, when grown, began his career in real estate.

=== Marriage ===
He was married to Zora Ann Caruthers on March 5, 1879, and, in 1914, she filed for separate maintenance, alleging that he "began to drink fifteen years ago, and has grown worse, so that now he is intoxicated almost daily." They were living in separate parts of the house at 1160 East Pico Street, situated adjacent to the Birdland business that Grider owned and managed. (Note: "House Divided Also Guarded". Los Angeles Times. 1914-10-16. p. 11. Archived from the original on 2022-06-07.)

Mrs. Grider charges that he speaks to her in gruff tones, in the form of peremptory orders. She also says he terrifies her by walking up and down the house at all hours of the night, and that frequently she awakens from sleep to find him within a few feet of her bed, silently staring at her.

The lawsuit was denied by Judge Monroe, who "found that there was absolutely no ground for divorce on the allegation of extreme cruelty." (Note: "Grider Peace Dove Alights". Los Angeles Times. 1914-10-29. p. II-10. Archived from the original on 2022-06-07.)

=== Death ===
Grider died on November 16, 1919, in his home at 1303 Central Avenue. The cause was given as "an affection of the heart which had been bothering him for several years." He had two children, Mrs. Idella Webster (later Idella Grider Manisera and also identified as Mrs. Isabella Moore) and Charles C. Grider. Burial was in Inglewood Cemetery. (Note: "Bury L. M. Grider". Los Angeles Times. 1919-11-21. p. 5. Archived from the original on 2022-06-07.)
