= List of Los Angeles City College people =

This page lists the members of Los Angeles City College, including students, alumni, faculty and academic affiliates associated.

== Alumni ==
=== Economics ===
- Lawrence Klein, economist, Nobel Prize recipient in Economics (deceased)

=== Communications ===
- Pete Arbogast, radio announcer
- Murray Fromson, broadcast journalist
- Paul Olden, radio announcer
- Ted Sobel, sports journalist

=== Education ===
- Maulana Karenga, professor of Black Studies, activist and founder of Kwanzaa
- Margaret Martin, Harmony Project founder and recipient of President's Citizens Medal

=== Entertainment ===
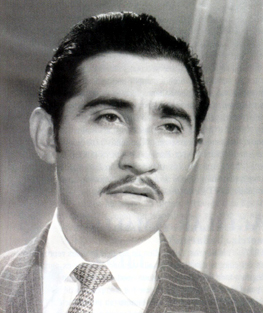
Rodolfo Acosta

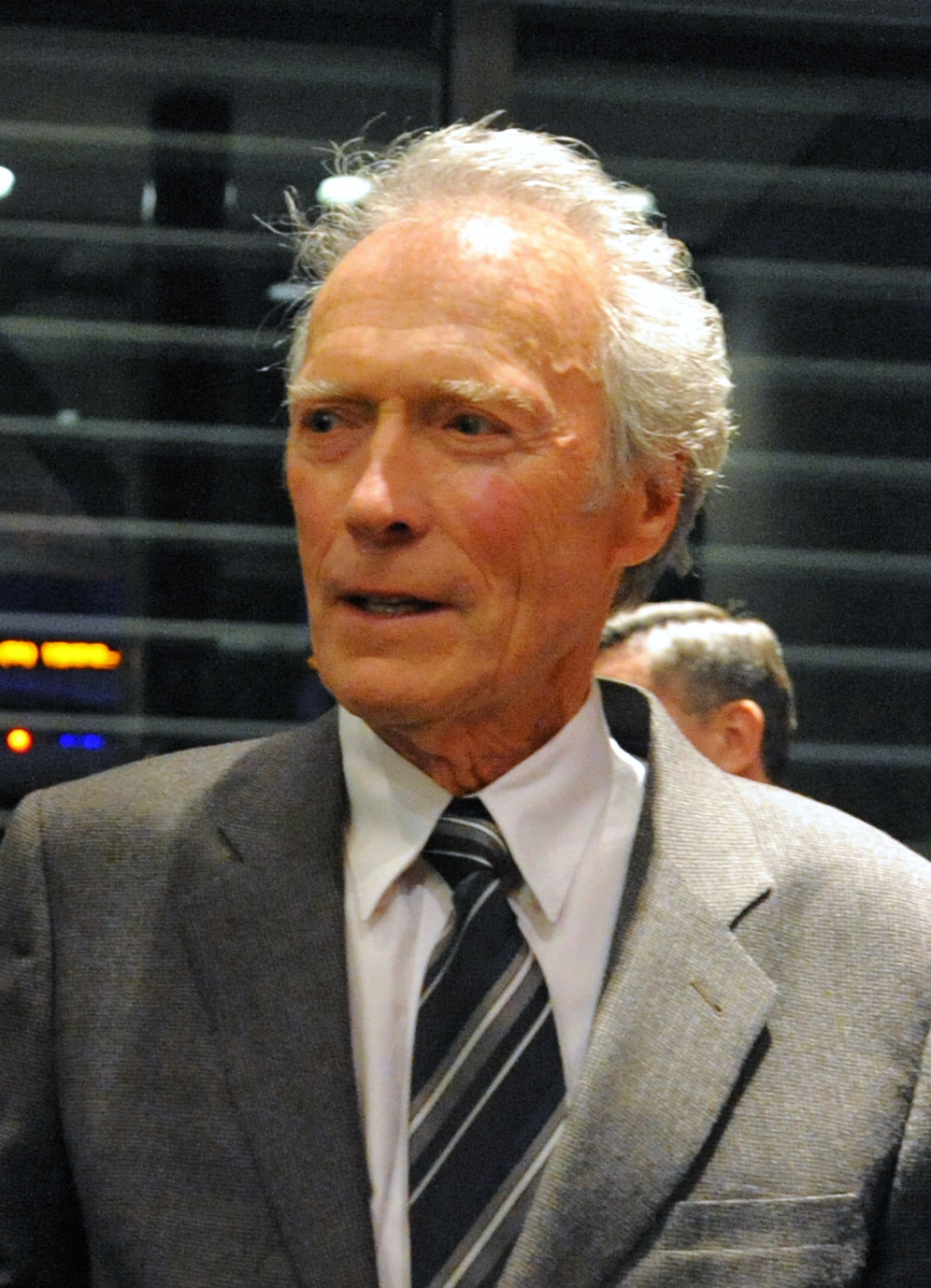
Clint Eastwood

==== Performance ====
- Rodolfo Acosta, actor
- Carol Adams, actress and dancer
- Michael Ansara, actor
- Rene Michelle Aranda, actress
- Bob Arbogast, radio broadcaster and voice actor
- Alan Arkin, actor, Academy Award recipient
- Billy Barty, actor and founder, Little People of America
- Brenda Benet, actress
- Barbara Billingsley, actor
- Tommy Bond, actor
- Sufe Bradshaw, actress
- Albert Brooks, actor, comedian and director
- Grand L. Bush, actor
- Diana Canova, actor
- Ralph Carter, actor
- James Coburn, actor, Academy Award recipient
- Angela Dorian, actress and model
- Clint Eastwood, actor; producer, Academy Award recipient; director
- Christine Elise, actress, author, writer, producer
- Mike Evans, actor
- Laurence Fishburne, actor
- Al Freeman Jr., actor, Emmy Award recipient
- Morgan Freeman, actor, Academy Award recipient
- Don Grady, actor on My Three Sons television series
- Debbie Shapiro Gravitte, actor, Tony Award recipient
- Deidre Hall, actor
- Mark Hamill, actor
- Earl Hammond, actor, voice actor
- Linda Hart, actor
- Alex Henteloff, actor
- Allen Hoskins, actor
- Jackie Joseph, actor
- Aron Kader, comedian
- Sally Kellerman, actor, Academy Award nominee
- Margaret Kerry, actor
- Wallace Langham, actor
- Ruta Lee, actor
- Elliott Lewis, actor, director and producer in old-time radio
- Whitman Mayo, actor
- Angela McEwan, actor
- James Mitchell, actor and dancer
- Dickie Moore, actor
- Wayne Morris, actor, WWII ace
- Shelley Morrison, actor
- Stephen Nichols, actor
- Jeanette Nolan, actor
- Hugh O'Brian, actor, Golden Globe Award recipient
- Rosie Perez, actor and choreographer
- Donna Reed, actor, Academy Award recipient
- Maggie Roswell, actor
- Reiko Sato, dancer and actress
- Wendy Schaal, actress
- Alexis Smith, actor, Tony Award recipient
- Mila del Sol, Philippine actress, entrepreneur, civic-leader, philanthropist
- Louise Sorel, actor
- Joseph Stern, actor
- Roy Thinnes, actor
- Irene Tsu, actress
- Robert Vaughn, actor, Emmy Award recipient
- David White, actor; played Larry Tate on the Bewitched television series
- Stuart Whitman, actor
- Cindy Williams, actor and producer
- Ed Williams, actor
- Esther Williams, actor, Golden Globe Award recipient
- Mykelti Williamson, actor
- Paul Winfield, actor, Emmy Award recipient
- Jo Anne Worley, actor
- Tony Young, actor

==== Production ====
- Ray Aghayan, costume designer, Emmy Award recipient
- Rudy Behlmer, director and author
- True Boardman, screenwriter and actor
- Zev Buffman, Broadway producer
- Charles Burnett, director and writer
- Charles Campbell, sound engineer, Academy Award recipient
- Tamra Davis, filmmaker
- Robert Elswit, cinematographer, Academy Award recipient
- F. Gary Gray, director and producer
- Maggie Greenwald, director and writer
- Ray Harryhausen, producer, director and special-effects artist; special Academy Award recipient
- Albert Hughes, director, producer, screenwriter
- Bruce Kimmel, director, producer, writer, actor and composer
- Mimi Leder, director, Emmy Award recipient
- Michael Lembeck, director, Emmy Award recipient; actor
- William McCloud, camera operator, Emmy Award recipient
- John Milius, screenwriter, producer and director
- Karen Moncrieff, director
- Sharon Oreck, producer and author
- José Quintero, director
- Gene Roddenberry, producer and screenwriter
- Robert J. Sexton, producer, director, writer, and former musician
- Tarsem Singh, director
- Kevin Tent, editor, Academy Award nominee

=== Fine arts ===
==== Art ====
- Don Bachardy, artist
- Billy Al Bengston, painter and sculptor
- Roberto Esteban Chavez, artist, known for his personally symbolic portraits, public murals
- Melvin Edwards, sculptor
- Cristian Gheorghiu, contemporary artist/painter
- Gerhardt Knodel (born 1940), textile artist, educator
- Doyle Lane, ceramist
- John Lees, artist and painter
- Kerry James Marshall, artist
- Evangeline Montgomery, print-maker, metal smith and weaver
- Ruth Orkin, photographer and filmmaker
- Hisako Terasaki, artist and etcher
- H.C. Westermann, printmaker and sculptor
- Robert Williams, painter and cartoonist

==== Dance ====
- Alvin Ailey, dancer and choreographer
- Janet Collins, ballerina

==== Design ====
- Lester Oliver Bankhead, architect
- Frank Gehry, architect, Pritzker Architecture Prize recipient
- Rudi Gernreich, fashion designer

==== Music ====
- Roy Ayers, jazz musician
- Chet Baker, trumpeter and vocalist
- Robert Bradley, blues musician
- Pamela Courson, singer
- Eric Dolphy, jazz musician
- Jean Fenn, opera singer
- Bob Florence, composer, band leader and educator
- Don Friedman, jazz pianist
- Herb Geller, jazz musician
- Jerry Goldsmith, composer, Academy Award recipient
- M.C. Hammer, aka Stanley K. Burrell, R&B musician
- DJ Irene, aka Irene M. Gutiérrez, electronic music DJ
- Earl Kim, composer
- Leon Kirchner, composer
- Florence LaRue, lead singer of The 5th Dimension
- Howard Leese, rock musician and producer
- Jerry Leiber and Mike Stoller, songwriters and Hall of Fame producers, Grammy Award recipients
- David Liebe Hart, outsider musician, street performer, artist, actor, puppeteer
- George London, opera singer and administrator
- Lebo M, composer
- Les McCann, jazz pianist and singer
- Charles Mingus, jazz musician
- Arthur Nakane, one-man band act
- Lennie Niehaus, composer
- Marni Nixon, vocalist
- Odetta, folk singer
- Dianne Reeves, jazz singer, Grammy Award recipient
- Howard Rumsey, jazz musician
- Robin Russell, drummer
- Jack Sheldon, jazz musician
- Leonard Slatkin, conductor, National Medal of Arts recipient
- Ed Thigpen, jazz drummer
- Russ Titelman, music producer, Grammy Award recipient; songwriter
- John Williams, composer, Academy Award recipient
- La Monte Young, composer
- Michele Zukovsky, principal and solo clarinetist of the Los Angeles Philharmonic

==== Writing ====
- Byron Barton, author and illustrator
- Kurt Boone, author and poet
- Charles Bukowski, poet and author
- Ed Bullins, playwright, Obie Award recipient
- Leonard Buschel, writer, founder of film festival and addiction and recovery organization
- Carlos Castaneda, author
- Charles Eastman, playwright and screenwriter
- Charles Gordone, playwright, Pulitzer Prize recipient; actor, Obie Award recipient; director
- Jim Harmon, author and producer
- Michael S. Harper, poet, former Poet Laureate of Rhode Island
- Bryan Malessa, author
- Terry McMillan, author
- David Meltzer, poet, musician and educator
- Alejandro Murguía, poet, current Poet Laureate of San Francisco
- Pat Parker, poet and activist
- Judith Reisman, conservative writer
- Carolyn See, author and educator
- Gerald Silver, author, educator, and community activist
- Justin Tanner, playwright
- Quincy Troupe, poet; former Poet Laureate of California

=== Law ===
- John Branca, music attorney, co-executor of the Michael Jackson Estate
- Albert L. Gordon, lawyer and gay rights advocate

=== Public service ===
==== Military ====
- Susan Ahn Cuddy, U.S. Navy, first Asian-American female Navy officer, first female gunnery officer, WWII
- Herbert R. Temple Jr. (Ret.), chief of the National Guard Bureau

==== Elected officials ====
- Hal Bernson, Los Angeles City Council member
- Tom LaBonge, Los Angeles City Council member
- Louis R. Nowell, Los Angeles City Council member (former)
- Bernard C. Parks, Los Angeles City Council member and former chief of police
- Arthur K. Snyder, Los Angeles City Council member, lawyer
- Diane Watson, member of Congress

==== Judiciary ====
- Lourdes Baird, U.S. District Court (Ret.)
- Vaino Spencer, Los Angeles County Superior Court, co-founded the Black Women Lawyers Association and the National Association of Women Judges, deceased

=== Religion ===
- Robert Sirico, Roman Catholic priest, founder of the Acton Institute

=== Science ===
- Lawrence H. Johnston, physicist
- Rosella Kanarik, mathematics professor
- Robert B. Leighton, astrophysicist, Rumsford Prize and James Craig Watson Medal recipient
- Seymour Liebergot, former NASA Flight Controller during the Apollo program

=== Sports ===
==== Baseball ====
- Emmett Ashford, baseball umpire
- Dennis Gilbert, LACC Hall of Fame baseball inductee, sports agent and entrepreneur

==== Basketball ====
- Larry Friend, professional basketball player

==== Football ====
- Kermit Alexander, professional football player
- Don Bishop, professional football player
- Ron Botchan, football coach
- Homer Butler, professional football player
- Milt Davis, professional football player
- Mike Douglass, former NFL player
- Vince Evans, professional football player
- Reggie Haynes, professional football player
- Woodley Lewis, professional football player
- Rod Martin, former All-Pro player Oakland Raiders
- Jaelan Phillips, professional football player
- Harry Thompson, football player

==== Track ====
- Jeff Williams, sprinter

==== Wrestling ====
- José "Pepper" Gomez, professional wrestler and bodybuilder

=== Miscellaneous ===
- Richard Butler, white supremacist
- Mary Yasuko Fujishima, businessperson

== See also ==
- List of people from Los Angeles
