= Methodist Episcopal Church of Pescadero =

Historic church in California, United States

- U.S. National Register of Historic Places
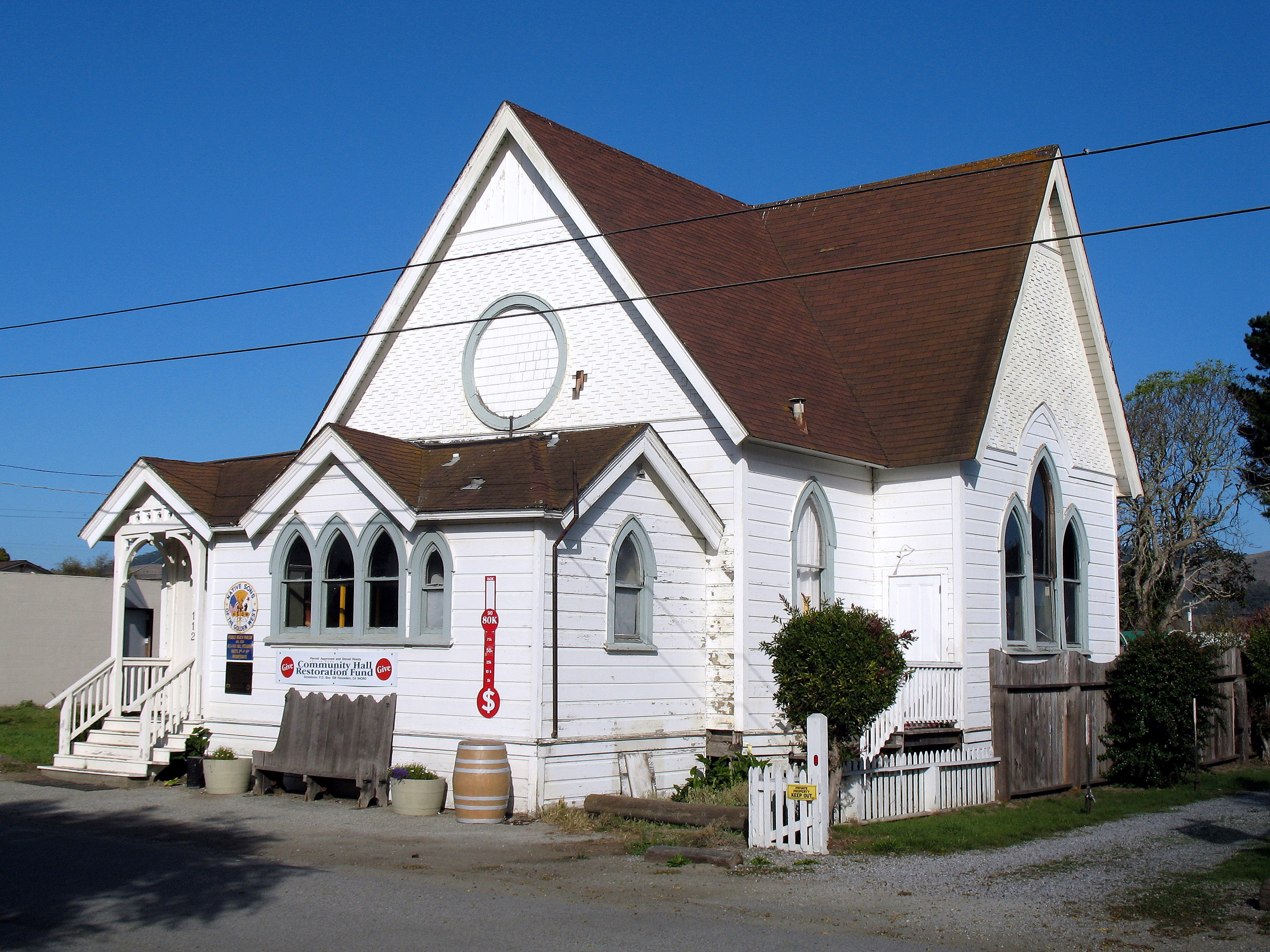

- Location within California Location within the United States
- Location: 108 San Gregorio St., Pescadero, California
- Coordinates: 37°15′05″N 122°22′54″W
- Area: 0.1 acres (0.040 ha)
- Built: 1890
- Architectural style: Gothic Revival
- NRHP reference No.: 82002260
- Added to NRHP: March 10, 1982

The Methodist Episcopal Church of Pescadero (currently known as Native Sons of the Golden West Pebble Beach Parlor) is a historic church at 108 San Gregorio Street in Pescadero, California.

It was built in 1890 and added to the National Register of Historic Places in 1982.

It is Gothic Revival in style.

It served as a church only briefly after its completion in 1890; by 1899 church services were only held once a month in circuit rider fashion.

In the 1920s and 1930s it was used by families of Japanese-American agricultural workers for after-school teaching of Japanese language and cultural traditions, but this ended abruptly upon Pearl Harbor.

It served as a school after the 1906 San Francisco earthquake, and was converted to a community center in 1920.

It was later purchased by the Native Sons of the Golden West, Pebble Beach Parlor, and the Native Daughters of the Golden West, Ano Nuevo Parlor.
