= Gerald Silver =

American community activist, educator, and author (1932/1933–2021)

Gerald "Jerry" Silver
- Born: Gerald Albert Silver; 1932/1933; Omaha, Nebraska, U.S.
- Died: May 30, 2021 (aged 88); Los Angeles, California, U.S.
- Occupation: Community activist · Educator · Author · Publisher
- Years active: 1960s–2021
- Organizations: Homeowners of Encino (founder); Encino Neighborhood Council; Van Nuys Airport Citizens Advisory Council; Ventura Boulevard Specific Plan Review Board
- Known for: Advocate for quality‑of‑life issues in the San Fernando Valley; watchdog of urban development
- Notable work: Co‑authored Weekend Fathers (1970); Second Loves: A Guide for Women Involved with Divorced Men; textbooks on data processing; numerous community reports
- Spouse(s): First wife: Joan B. Silver; Second wife: Myrna L. Silver
- Children: 4

Gerald Albert "Jerry" Silver (1932/1933 – May 30, 2021) was an American community activist, educator, and author in the San Fernando Valley. He founded Homeowners of Encino and served on local advisory bodies dealing with development, traffic, and land-use issues. Over several decades, Silver publicly opposed overdevelopment and traffic congestion, and was a proponent of slow growth and environmental concerns.

== Early life ==
Gerald Albert Silver was born in Omaha, Nebraska but moved to Hollywood, California at a young age. He was raised by a single mother who was a Russian immigrant. As a teenager, he opened a print shop on Santa Monica Boulevard near Los Angeles City College, where he later began teaching graphic arts.

== Career ==
In the 1960s, Silver transitioned into data processing as the field emerged, teaching courses on the subject and eventually co-authoring some of the earliest textbooks in the discipline. In the early 1970s, alongside his first wife, Joan, he wrote and published foundational college textbooks on data processing and computer programming. After his divorce in the mid-1970s, Silver married Myrna, who became his writing partner. Together, they continued to publish works on business data processing and later on social issues, such as Weekend Fathers, a book based partly on his personal experiences that addressed the treatment of divorced fathers. They also co-wrote the book Second Loves: A Guide for Women Involved with Divorced Men. Silver's life experiences also brought him into leadership positions with volunteer organizations such as United Fathers Organization (UFO), which advocated for the rights of single fathers. Silver was a professor at Los Angeles City College before retiring in the late 1990s.

== Community activism ==
Silver's activism began in the early 1980s after he moved to Encino and found his home located in the flight path of Van Nuys Airport. Seeing this as an environmental and quality-of-life issue, he became involved in local politics and community advocacy, often confronting Los Angeles politicians and bureaucrats in contentious public forums.

In 1983, Silver founded Homeowners of Encino, a watchdog organization focused on holding elected officials accountable for projects impacting San Fernando Valley residents. He was also a member of several local boards and councils, including:

- The Encino Neighborhood Council (from its inception in 2002 until shortly before his death)
- The Van Nuys Airport Citizens Advisory Council
- The Ventura Boulevard Specific Plan Review Board
- Stop the Noise homeowners coalition

Silver's advocacy focused on issues such as traffic congestion, aircraft noise, air pollution, overdevelopment, tax increases, the Valley secession movement, and "sign blight." He was credited with successfully opposing several large-scale projects, including the proposed double-decking of the Ventura Freeway (U.S. Route 101), the Los Angeles water reclamation project, the San Fernando Valley light rail proposal, and numerous proposals affecting Ventura Boulevard, the San Fernando Valley's major thoroughfare. According to some observers, Silver and his allies popularized the anti-water reclamation slogan "toilet-to-tap", although later he changed course somewhat and championed water reclamation for irrigation purposes. On several occasions Silver joined forces with local Indian tribes, such as the Chumash Indians, to stop what he perceived as overdevelopment of the city.

== Criticism ==
Silver's opposition to development projects drew criticism from public officials, journalists, and developers. A 2003 Los Angeles Times profile described him as a "hero to some and a villain to others." Critics characterized him as obstructionist or as a NIMBY. Supporters described his activism as environmentally motivated.

Los Angeles City Councilwoman Cindy Miscikowski was quoted as saying that Silver could be "bombastic and difficult"; another government official said that Silver was a "true villain". An earlier profile quoted critics who described Silver as an "irresponsible naysayer." By contrast, Richard Close, the president of the Sherman Oaks Homeowners Association said that Silver was "an inspiration", and Ira Handelman, a consultant for developers, called him "a straight shooter".

== Personal life ==
Silver was married twice and had four children with his first wife, Joan. He married his second wife, Myrna, who had two daughters of her own, in the mid-1970s after his divorce; they remained married until his death.

== Death ==
Silver died at age 88 after several months of cancer and palliative care. He was survived by three sons, one daughter, and his wife, Myrna.

== Legacy ==
Silver's archival papers are held in the University Library at California State University, Northridge.

== Publications ==
- Simplified FORTRAN IV Programming. New York: Harcourt Brace Jovanovich, 1971. (co-authored with Joan Silver)
- Data Processing for Business. New York: Harcourt Brace Jovanovich, 1973. (co-authored with Joan Silver)
- Introduction to Programming: Programming Logic and Flowcharting. New York: McGraw-Hill, 1975. (co-authored with Joan Silver)
- Introduction to Systems Analysis. Englewood Cliffs: Prentice-Hall, 1976. (co-authored with Joan Silver)
- Small Computer Systems for Business. New York: McGraw-Hill, 1978.
- The Social Impact of Computers. New York: Harcourt Brace Jovanovich, 1979.
- Weekend Fathers : For Divorced Fathers, Second Wives and Grandparents : Solutions to the Problems of Child Custody, Child Support, Alimony and Property Settlements. New York: Harper & Row, 1981. (co-authored with Myrna Silver)
- Simplified BASIC Programming for Microcomputers. New York: Harper and Row, 1984. (co-authored with Myrna Silver)
- Second Loves : A Guide for Women Involved with Divorced Men. New York: Praeger, 1985. (co-authored with Myrna Silver)
- Computers & Information Processing. New York: Harper and Row, 1986 (co-authored with Myrna Silver)
- Learning Computer Programming: Structured Logic, Algorithms, and Flowcharting. Boston: Boyd & Fraser, 1986. (co-authored with Myrna Silver)
- Simplified BASIC Programming for IBM PCs, PS/2s, Compatibles & Clones. New York: Ardsley House Publishers, 1988. (co-authored with Myrna Silver)
- Data Communications for Business. Boston: Boyd & Fraser, 1991. (co-authored with Myrna Silver)
- Layout, Design, and Typography for the Desktop Publisher. Dubuque, Iowa: Wm. C. Brown, 1991. (co-authored with Myrna Silver)
- How to Use Computer Software: A Hands-On Workbook for Printers. Encino, CA: Editorial Enterprises, 1992. (co-authored with Myrna Silver)
- Understanding Computers. New York: HarperPerennial, 1994. (co-authored with Myrna Silver)
- Modern Graphics Arts Pasteup. Encino, CA: Editorial Enterprises, 1995. (co-authored with Myrna Silver)
- Exploring PageMaker 5.0 for Windows. Danvers, MA: Boyd & Fraser Pub. Co., 1995. (co-authored with Myrna Silver)
