= Bale Grist Mill State Historic Park =

- Bale Mill
- U.S. National Register of Historic Places
- California Historical Landmark
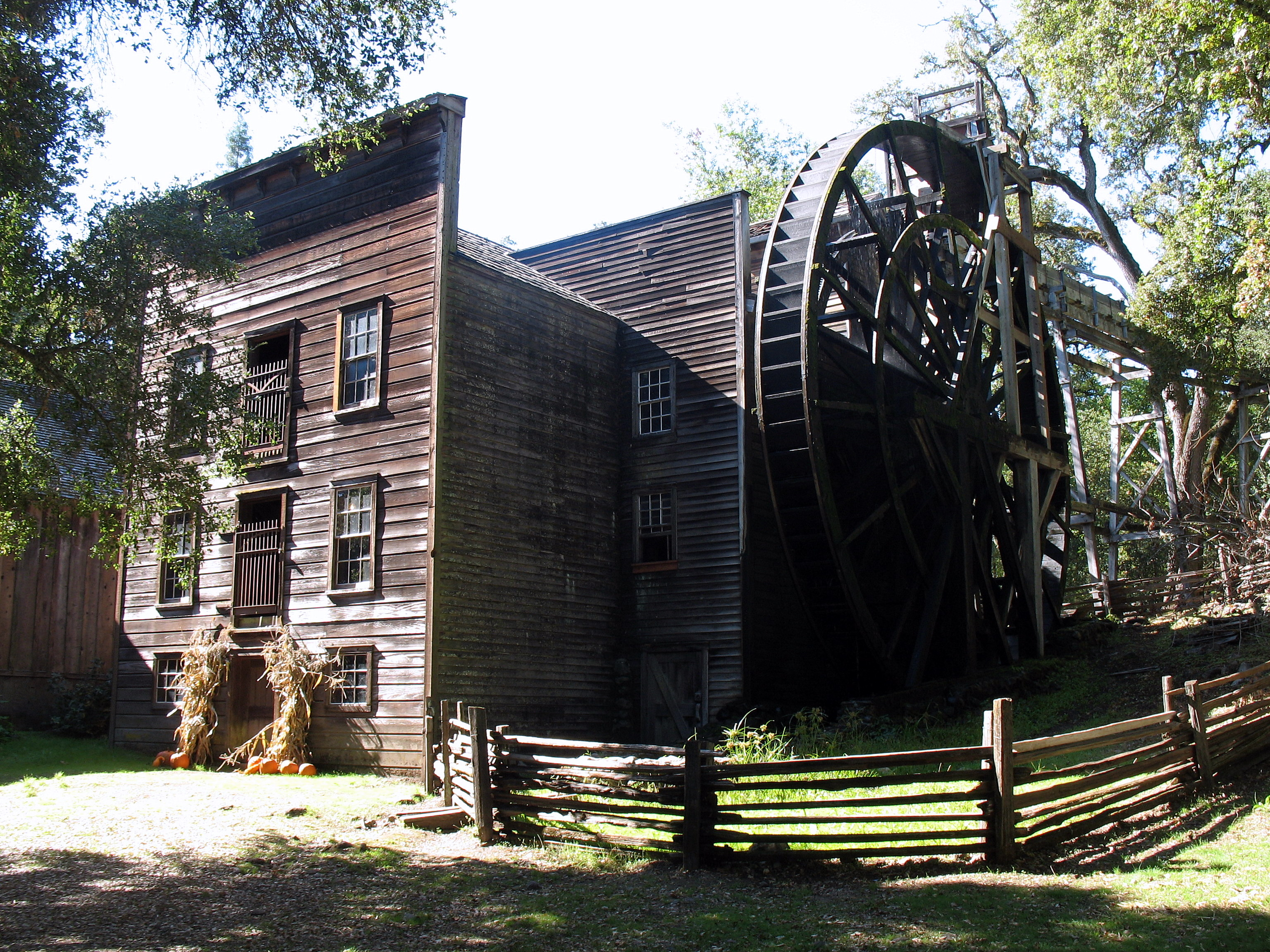

- Location within California Location within the United States
- Location: Napa County, California
- Nearest city: St. Helena, California
- Coordinates: 38°32′29″N 122°30′30″W
- Area: 5 acres (2.0 ha)
- Built: 1846
- NRHP reference No.: 72000240
- CHISL No.: 359
- Added to NRHP: June 22, 1972

Bale Grist Mill State Historic Park is a California state park located in Napa County between St. Helena and Calistoga. The park is the site of a water-powered grist mill that was built in 1846 is one of only two water-driven mills remaining west of the Mississippi River.

== History ==
The mill was established in 1846 by Dr. Edward Turner Bale on property in Rancho Carne Humana land grant. Bale lived near the site until his death in 1849.

The gristmill and granary were built with local materials, Douglas firs and coast redwoods. Some timbers were cut to length with the bark left on, while others were roughed out with hand tools. The timbers were notched and held in place with wooden pegs as well as nails and screws. The foundation of the structure is native stone. The mill was powered by a waterwheel, with water diverted from Mill Creek nearby. A ditch carried the water from a millpond to a wooden flume, which brought the water to the top of the waterwheel. The first wheel did not provide enough power during dry summers and was replaced by a larger one, similar to the one at the mill today.

The mill was once the center of social activity as Napa Valley settlers gathered to have their corn and wheat ground into meal or flour. Farmers brought grain to the mill where it was placed into the boot of an elevator to be mechanically transported upstairs where it was cleaned by various types of equipment. The slow turning of the old grind stones and the dampness of the mill's site gave the meal a special quality for making cornbread, yellowbread, shortening bread and spoonbread. As old timers put it, "When meal comes to you that way, like the heated underside of a settin' hen, it bakes bread that makes city bread taste like cardboard."

Theodore Benedict Lyman bought the mill and surrounding land in 1871 and passed ownership on to his son, William Whittingham Lyman. The mill remained in operation until 1879.

== Restoration ==
After William Lyman's death, his wife, the former Mrs. Sarah A. Nowland deeded the property to Native Sons of the Golden West, and through them the mill was restored during a period in the late 1960s and early 1970s through efforts of the Native Son Parlors of Napa County, under the leadership of past Grand President Bismarck Bruck, a grandson of Dr. Bale.

The mill and its 36-foot water wheel are protected as a state historic landmark and have been partially restored. A trail connects the historic park to Bothe-Napa Valley State Park. Additionally, the park includes the site of the first church in the Napa Valley as well as the Pioneer Cemetery.

Visitors can hike from the mill on the historic trail to Bothe-Napa Valley State Park, which features extensive picnic facilities and a number of trails. The round trip hike from Bale Grist Mill State Historic Park to Bothe-Napa Valley State Park is approximately two miles.

In 2011 during the California budget crisis, the mill and adjacent park were among those targeted to be closed due to lack of funding. The Napa Valley State Park Association petitioned the state to operate the park in order to avoid closure. Milling demonstrations and tours of the historic mill are offered on weekends. Legislation was passed in 2014 to allow sale of flour produced at the mill to the public starting January 1, 2016 in order to help defray maintenance costs and preserve the mill.

== Gallery ==
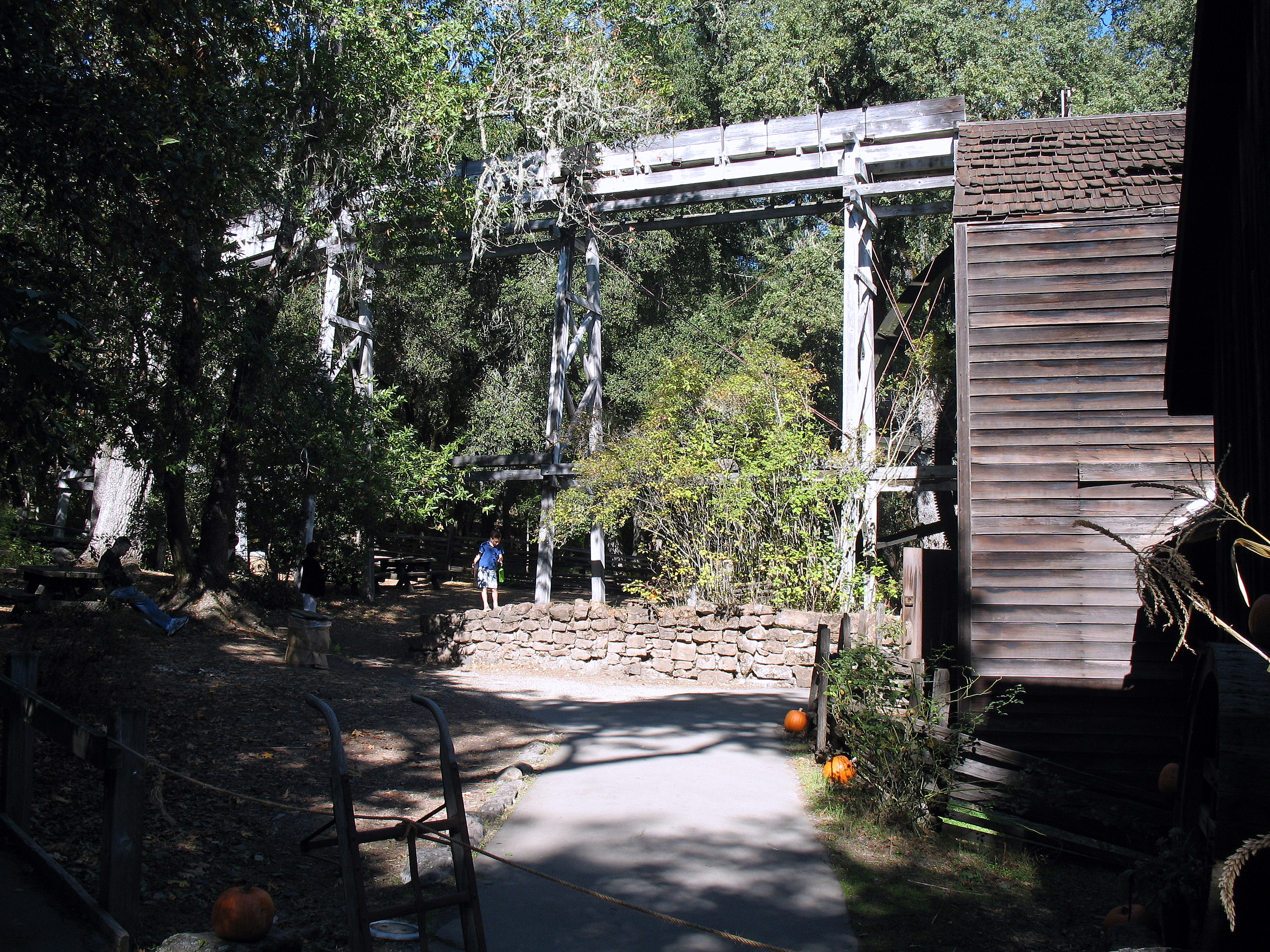

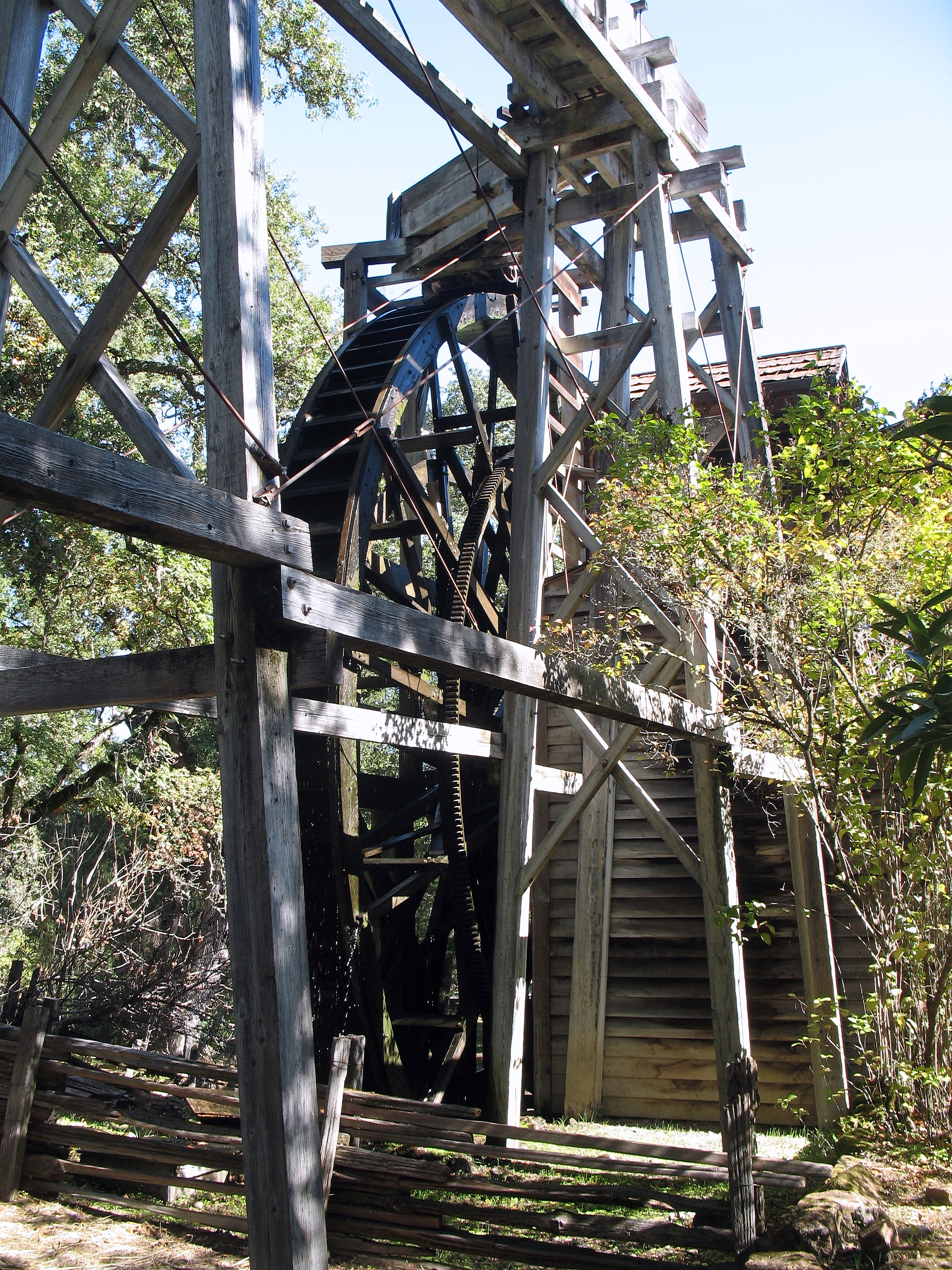

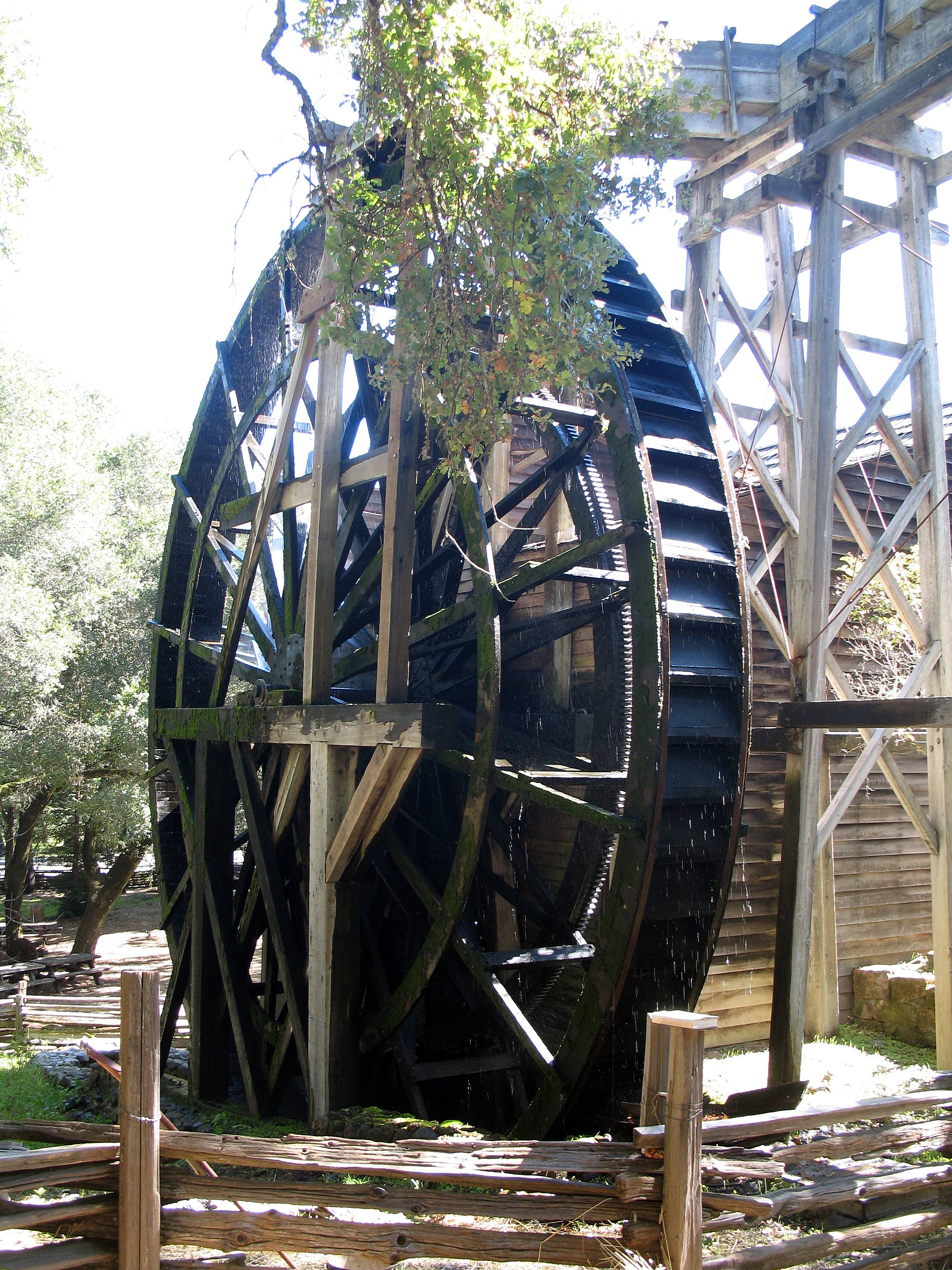
