= Garfield Monument (San Francisco) =

Monument in San Francisco, California, U.S.

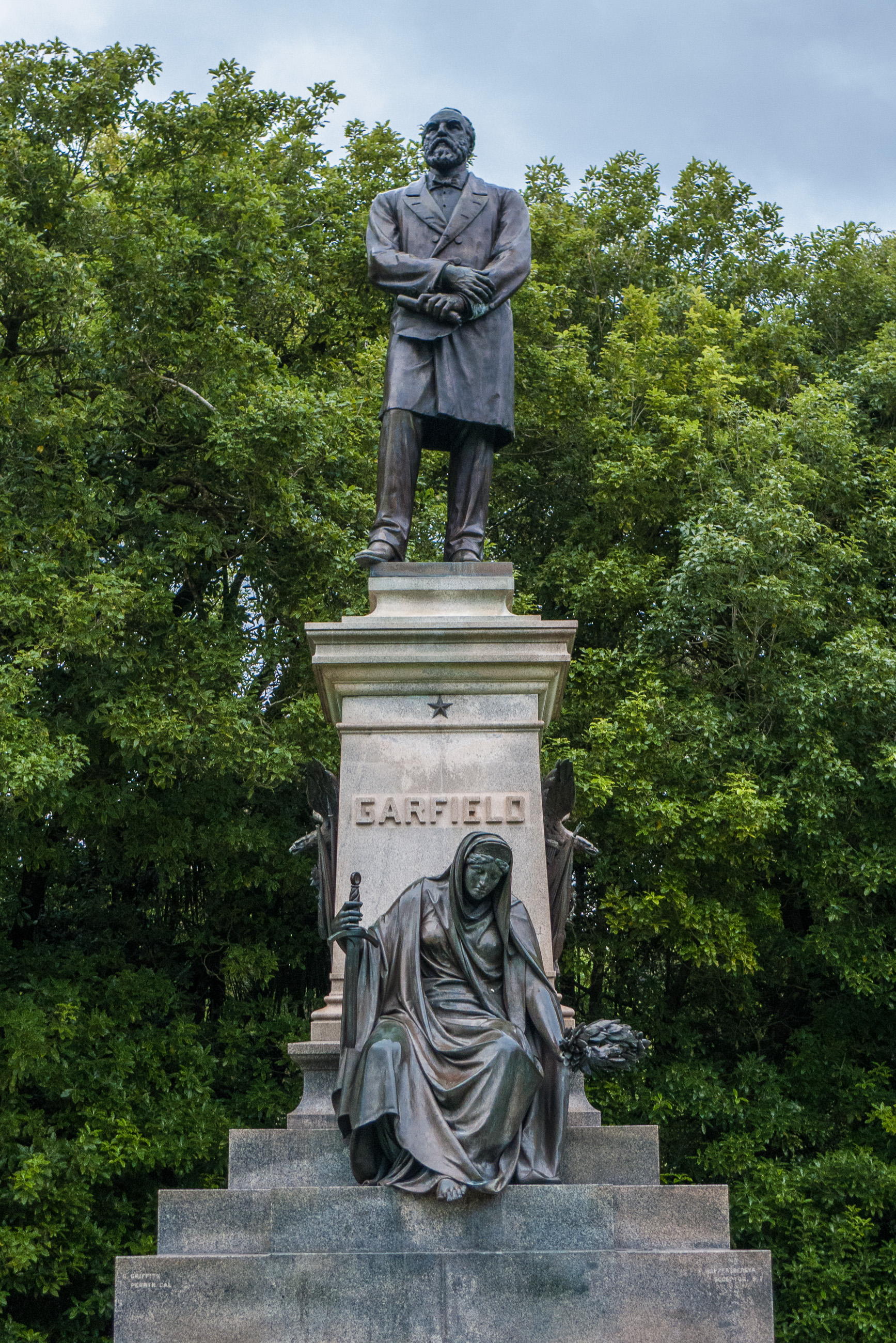
- The monument in 2010
- Location: San Francisco, California, U.S.; 37.77181°N 122.45884°W

The Garfield Monument is installed in San Francisco's Golden Gate Park, in the U.S. state of California.
