= Edward Turner Bale =

British-born Californian physician, entrepreneur and ranchero

Edward Turner Bale (1810 – October 9, 1849), later known by his Spanish name Don Eduardo A. Bale, was a British-born Californian medical doctor, entrepreneur, and ranchero. He is known for having built the Bale Grist Mill in Napa County, California.

== Life ==
Bale arrived from England in Monterey, California in 1837 on the H.M.S. Harriet, having served as the ship's surgeon. He soon became Surgeon-In-Chief of the Mexican Army under General Mariano Vallejo, and on March 21, 1839, married Vallejo's niece Maria Ignacia Soberanes. After becoming a citizen of Mexico in March 1841, in June, Bale was granted the Rancho Carne Humana, which comprised the land between what is now Rutherford and Calistoga, California.

Construction of the Bale Grist Mill located between St. Helena and Calistoga was completed in 1846, the same year the Bear Flag Revolt claimed independence from Mexico. Bale's connection to the Bear Flag Party is uncertain, but there is evidence that they met at his mill before the capture of Sonoma. Several of Bale's acquaintances were members of the Bear Flag Party.

During the California Gold Rush, Bale tried his hand at mining, and eventually caught a fever from which he never recovered. He died on October 9, 1849.

== Legacy ==
On December 26, 1860, his daughter Carolina married winemaker Charles Krug. Bale's wife made sure the daughter was protected in a prenuptial that allowed for her to keep 20 acres (0.08 km^{2}) of land north of St. Helena, California, on which Krug planted a vineyard.

Bale, California is named for him.
