= Rancho Carne Humana =

Mexican land grant in California

Coordinates: 38.510°N 122.480°W

Rancho Carne Humana was a 17,962-acre (72.69 km^{2}) Mexican land grant in present-day Napa County, California, given in 1841 by Governor Juan Alvarado to Edward Turner Bale. The name means "human flesh" in Spanish. There is speculation as to why the name was chosen. The grant was originally known to the native residents as "Huilic Noma" and also "Colijolmanoc". One naming theory speculates that Bale, in a bit of black humor, twisted "Colijolmanoc" into the similar-sounding Spanish "Carne Humana". Rancho Carne Humana was at the northern end of the Napa Valley, stretching from present-day Rutherford northward to Calistoga, ending at Tubbs Lane and including present-day St. Helena.

== History ==
Dr. Edward Turner Bale (1810-1849), an English physician, landed at Monterey in 1837, and practiced medicine there for five or six years. In 1840–43 he was surgeon of the California forces by General Mariano Vallejo's appointment. He married Maria Ygnacia Soberanes, the niece of both General Mariano Vallejo and Mariano's brother, Salvador Vallejo. Through General Vallejo's influence, Bale obtained a four league grant of Rancho Carne Humana in Napa Valley, north of George C. Yount's Rancho Caymus in 1841.

Bale and his family moved to the rancho in 1843. Bale established a grist mill to grind corn and wheat. In 1846 he built a saw-mill. In 1848, Bale joined the California Gold Rush, but became ill and died at the age of 38, leaving a widow, two sons and four daughters.

With the cession of California to the United States following the Mexican–American War, the 1848 Treaty of Guadalupe Hidalgo provided that the land grants would be honored. As required by the Land Act of 1851, a claim for Rancho Carne Humana was filed with the Public Land Commission in 1852, and the grant was patented to Maria Ygnacia Bale and the heirs of Edward T. Bale in 1879.

Bale had often used land in payment for services rendered him. His family was financially pressed after his death. His widow Maria Ygnacia Bale was left with managing the estate and battled the courts for decades to hang on to what was left of Bale's original land grant. To his sons he left his cattle, since cattle at the time were of greater value, and to his daughters he left tracts of land to act as their dowries. Upon one such tract of land just north of St. Helena, their daughter Caroline Bale and her husband Charles Krug planted grapes.

== Historic sites of the Rancho ==
- Bale Grist Mill. The grist mill was erected by Edward T. Bale in 1846.
- Charles Krug Winery. Founded in 1861 by Charles Krug (1825-1892), this is the oldest operating winery in Napa Valley. Krug made the first commercial wine in Napa County in 1858.
- York's Cabin. John T. York, the first American to settle in the area that became Calistoga, constructed this log cabin in 1845.
- Hudson Cabin. David Hudson was one of the early pioneers who helped develop the upper portion of Napa Valley by purchasing land, clearing it, and planting crops and building homes. Hudson built his cabin in 1845.
- Sam Brannan Cottage. Between 1859 and 1863, Samuel Brannan acquired more than 2,000-acre (8.1 km^{2}) at the north end of Napa Valley with the dream of making it the Saratoga of California. This is the only 1866 cottage remaining.
- Sam Brannan Store. The store Sam Brannan built in Calistoga.
- Kelsey House. Nancy Kelsey arrived in California in 1841 with the Bartleson–Bidwell Party and settled with her family south of present-day Calistoga.
- Napa Valley Railroad depot. The Napa Valley Railroad depot was built in 1868. Railroad brought people to Brannan's Calistoga resort.

== See also ==
- Ranchos of California
- List of ranchos of California
