= Native Sons of the Golden West =

Fraternal service organization in California, US

- Logo of the Native Sons of the Golden West
- Abbreviation: N.S.G.W.
- Formation: July 11, 1875; 151 years ago
- Founder: A. M. Winn
- Founded at: San Francisco
- Type: fraternal service organization
- Purpose: "To perpetuate in the minds of all native Californians the memories of the days of '49 to encourage a lively interest in all matters and measures relating to the promotion of the national interests and to the upbuilding of the State of California"
- Services: Historic preservation, Native American advocacy, anti-Asian immigration advocacy (historic)
- Affiliations: Native Daughters of the Golden West
- Website: nsgw.org

The Native Sons of the Golden West (NSGW) is a fraternal service organization founded in the U.S. state of California in 1875, dedicated to historic preservation and documentation of the state's historic structures and places, the placement of historic plaques, and other charitable functions in California. In 1890 the organization placed California's first marker honoring the discovery of gold, which gave rise to the state nickname, "The Golden State". U.S. President Richard M. Nixon and Chief Justice Earl Warren served terms as presidents of the NSGW.

== History ==
The Native Sons of the Golden West was founded 11 July 1875 by General A. M. Winn, a Virginian, as a lasting monument to the men and women of the Gold Rush era. General Winn had lived in California during the Gold Rush and was impressed with the spirit and perseverance of the Forty-Niners. Speaking of his object in organizing the Order General Winn said, "For twenty years my mind had been running on some lasting style of monument to mark and perpetuate the discovery of gold. I could not think of anything that would not perish in course of time. At last it came to my mind that an Order composed of native sons would effect the object and be sustained by pride of parentage and place of nativity while it would be an imperishable memento — an institution that would last through all time."

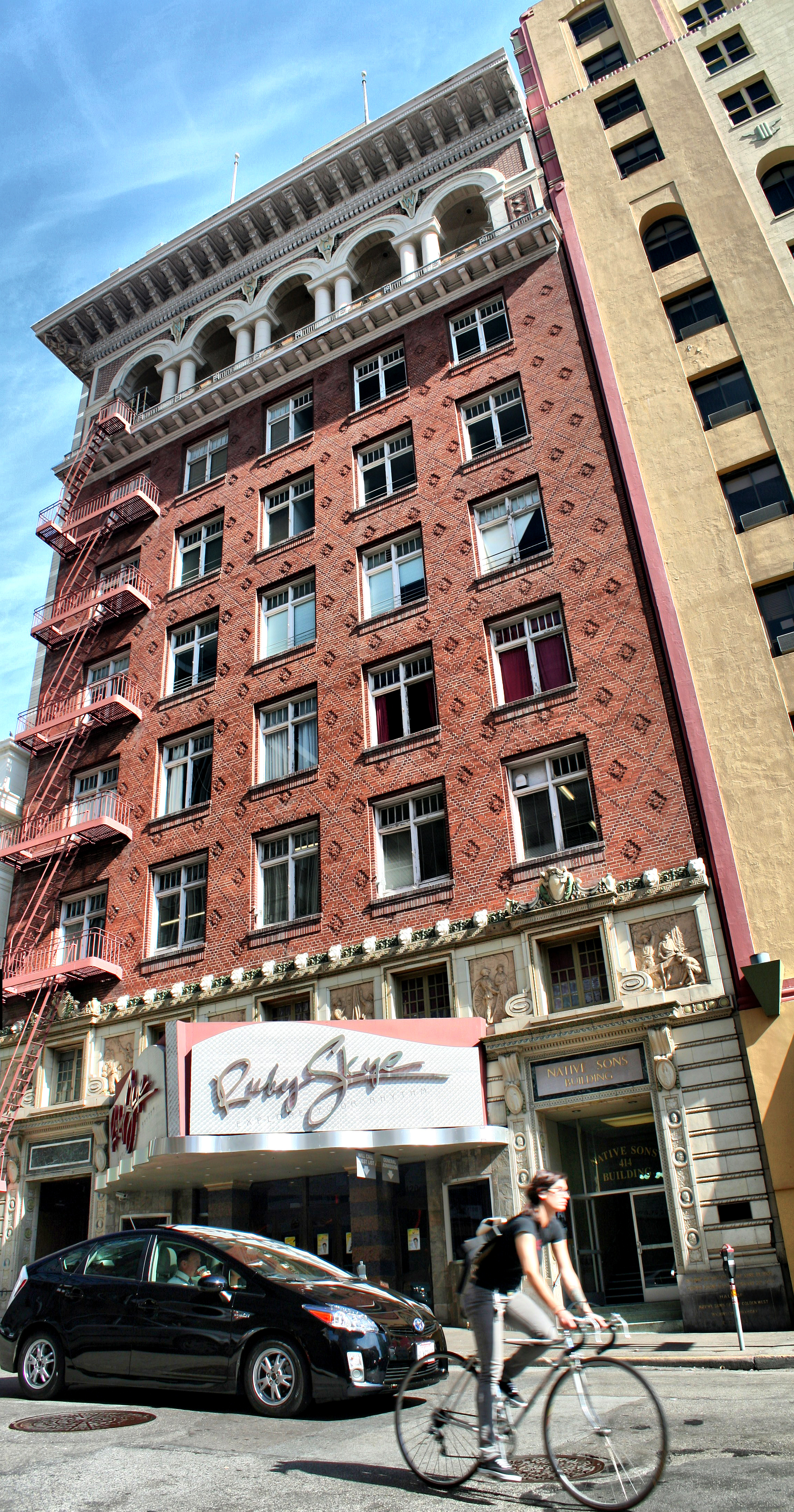
The Native Sons of the Golden West building in San Francisco.

The chief objects of the Order as set forth in its constitution were, "To perpetuate in the minds of all native Californians the memories of the days of '49 to encourage a lively interest in all matters and measures relating to the promotion of the national interests and to the upbuilding [sic] of the State of California." Today, the Native Sons of the Golden West is open to membership from any native-born, current or former resident of California origin. The Native Sons of the Golden West is a charitable and fraternal organization. Organized locally into "Parlors," the group is perhaps best known for the large number of commemorative markers it has placed throughout the state.

The society has a sister organization, the Native Daughters of the Golden West.

The Native Sons began as an organization "embracing only the sons of those sturdy pioneers who arrived on this coast prior to the admission of California as a state." In the 1920s, the Native Sons took two very different stances; one on immigration and one on rights for Native Americans. In April 1920, then-Grand President William P. Caubu of the Native Sons wrote that “California was given by God to a white people, and with God’s strength we want to keep it as He gave it to us." The Native Sons openly opposed Chinese, Mexican, and Japanese immigration and waged an unsuccessful legal battle for Japanese-Americans to be disenfranchised during World War II. However, by contrast, the Native Sons actively fought for California Native American rights. "The Commonwealth Club of San Francisco was looking into the matter of Indian rights under the 18 treaties as early as 1909. This resulted in a special section on Indian Affairs for the purpose of making a complete study of the rights, wrongs, and present condition of California Indians in 1924. The Native Sons was one of the groups that was active in this area. Study committees were formed and publicity as to the needs of the California Indians appeared in its magazine, the California Grizzly Bear. In 1922 and again in 1925, there were articles of real importance in arousing public opinion. In Nevada City, Native Sons Hydraulic Parlor No. 58 "aided the American Indians and succeeded in having the land set aside for native inhabitants. In April 1913, Indian agent C. H. Ashbury came from Reno to determine if the Indian land claims was valid and to conduct the proceedings, calling neighbors, city trustees, and member of the Native Sons and Daughters to testify..."

From the organization's founding until 2024, birth within California was one of the eligibility requirements for membership in the Native Sons. In summer 2024, as membership numbers became unsustainable, delegates at the annual meeting voted to accept as members "every United States citizen 18 and older who lives in California, regardless of place of birth".

== Historical preservation ==
Throughout its history, members of the Native Sons have safeguarded many of the landmarks of California's pioneer days, purchasing and rehabilitating them and then donating them to the State or local governments.

- Sutter's Fort, Sacramento: By 1888 the once proud fort built by John Sutter was abandoned and deteriorating and the City of Sacramento sought to demolish it. C. E. Grunsky of Native Sons of the Golden West Sunset Parlor #26 in Sacramento led the fight to purchase and restore this most important symbol of California's pioneer history. After two years of fundraising, the Native Sons bought the historic Central Building and turned the land and building over to the State of California for further restoration.
- San Francisco Maritime National Historical Park, San Francisco: The Grace Quan is a reproduction of a 19th-century Chinese shrimp fishing junk. The replica was built in 2003 by the San Francisco Maritime National Historical Park and all of the wood for construction was donated by Native Sons, Redwood Parlor #66.
- Rancho Petaluma Adobe, Petaluma: In 1910, Native Sons of the Golden West, Petaluma Parlor #27 purchased what remained of General Mariano G. Vallejo's vast adobe ranch house. Over half of the building had succumbed to neglect and the forces of nature. In 1932 it was registered as California State Historical Landmark #18. After years of work and fundraising, the fully restored historic site was turned over to the State of California in 1951.
- San Pasqual Battlefield State Historic Park, Escondido: San Pasqual Battlefield State Historic Park honors the soldiers who fought in the 1846 Battle of San Pasqual, the bloodiest battle in California during the Mexican–American War. The Native Sons of the Golden West were instrumental in raising money, preserving and ultimately creating the park which was then given to the State of California.
- James W. Marshall Monument Marshall Gold Discovery State Historic Park, Coloma: In 1886, the members of the Native Sons of the Golden West, Placerville Parlor #9 felt that the "Discoverer of Gold" deserved a monument to mark his final resting place. In May 1890, five years after Marshall's death, Placerville Parlor #9 of the Native Sons of the Golden West successfully advocated the idea of a monument to the State Legislature, which appropriated a total of $9,000 for the construction of the monument and tomb, the first such monument erected in California. A statue of Marshall stands on top of the monument, pointing to the spot where he made his discovery in 1848. The monument was rededicated October 8, 2010 by the Native Sons of the Golden West, Georgetown Parlor #91 in honor of the 200th anniversary of James W. Marshall's birth.
- Pioneer Monument Donner Memorial State Park, Truckee: The Pioneer Monument was erected in honor of all who made the difficult trek across the western plains and mountains to reach California during the 1840s. Constructed near the site of the cabins that gave shelter to the Donner Party, work on the monument began in 1901. On June 6, 1918 in a ceremony that included Donner Party survivors, the Native Sons of the Golden West donated the completed monument and eleven (11) surrounding acres to the State of California.
- Old Customhouse (Monterey, California): The Monterey Customs House, over which the American flag was first permanently raised in California, was a landmark that Native Sons determined should not disappear if within the power of the Order to prevent it. The property belonged to the United States Government, but the Native Sons obtained a lease of the buildings and grounds and restored them in the early 1900s. The lease was ultimately transferred to a State Commission appointed under a legislative act passed in 1901 which act also carried an appropriation for further restoration of the building.
- Colton Hall, Monterey: Native Sons were instrumental in 1903 in securing a legislative appropriation for necessary repairs on Colton Hall. It was within this building in September 1849 that the convention convened which drafted the Constitution under California was admitted into the Union.
- Mission San Antonio de Padua, Alta: Mission San Antonio de Padua was founded on July 14, 1771, the third mission founded in Alta California by Father Presidente Junípero Serra, and site of the first Christian marriage and first use of fired-tile roofing in Upper California. The first attempt at rebuilding the Mission came in 1903, when the California Historical Landmarks League began holding outings at San Antonio. "Preservation and restoration of Mission San Antonio began. The Native Sons of the Golden West supplied $1,400. Tons of debris were removed from the interior of the chapel. Breaches in the side wall were filled in."
- Bear Flag Monument, Sonoma: "For many years, the site in Sonoma Plaza where the bear flag originally had been raised went unmarked. Largely through the efforts of the Native Sons, the legislature appropriated $5,000 for a monument to be placed there. The Native Sons raised $500 to prepare the site, put on dedication ceremonies, and to move the huge rock that serves as the pedestal from a mile away." The piece is listed as a California Historical Landmark.
- Bale Grist Mill founded by Edward Turner Bale in 1846 was preserved and restored through efforts of Native Sons.

== Historical markers ==
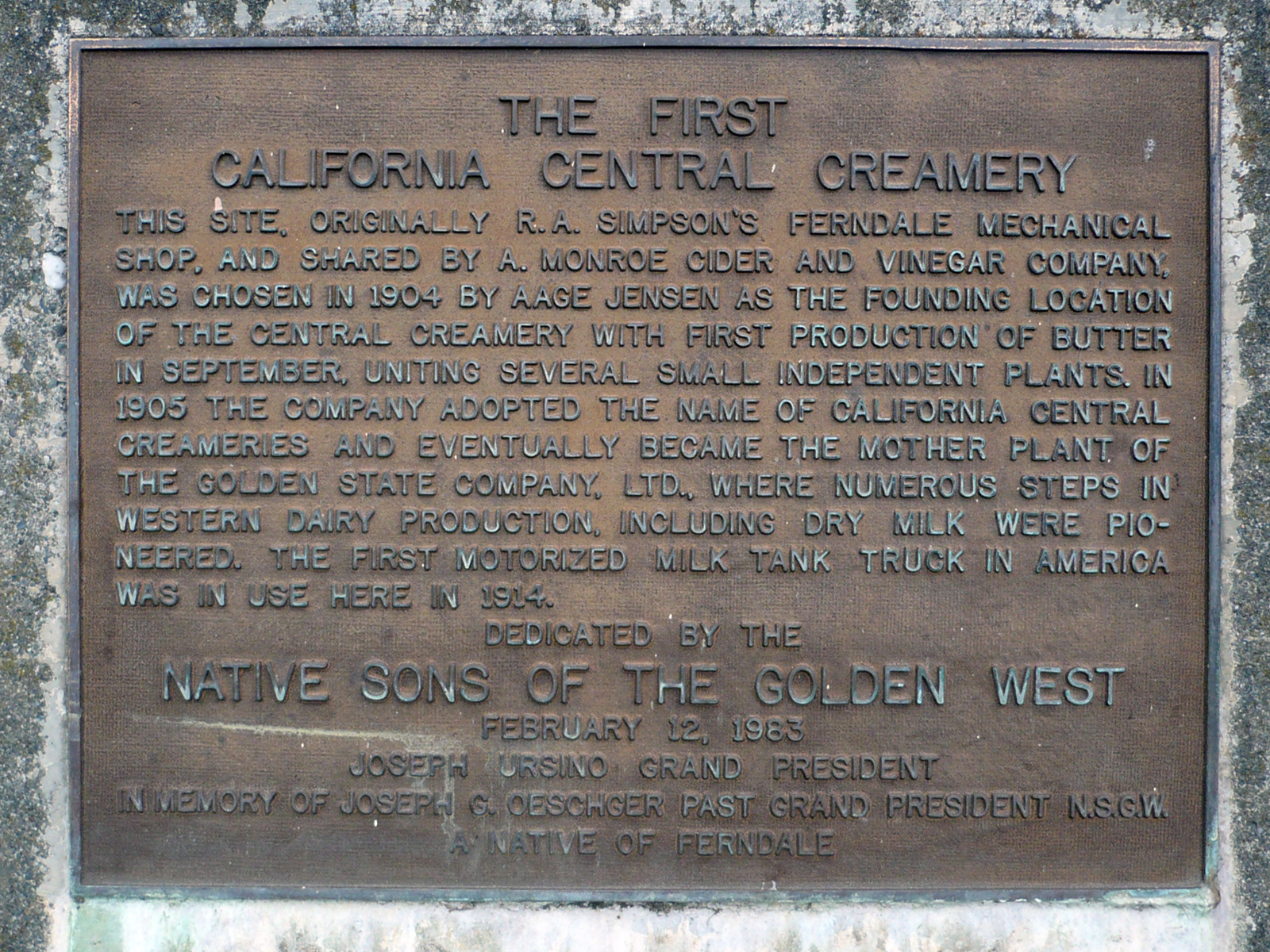
An NSGW marker at the site of the first California Central Creamery in Ferndale, California.

Chapters of the organization (called "Parlors") place historical markers on buildings and on sites of historical interest. The organization maintains a list of the over 1,200 markers in place. One of these plaques is featured in the movie 'The Karate Kid on the side of Daniel LaRusso's new school in California.

== Publications ==
From 1905 through 1954 the Native Sons and Daughters of the Golden West published The Grizzly Bear.

== Notable members ==
- George W. C. Baker (1872-1953), Los Angeles City Council member, 1931-1935
- Edmund G. Brown (1905-1996), Attorney General of California, 1951-1959; Governor of California, 1959-1967
- Lewis Francis Byington (1868-1943), San Francisco Supervisor, 1898-1900; District Attorney of San Francisco, 1900-1905
- Lloyd G. Davies (1914-1957), Los Angeles City Council member, 1943-1951
- Howard E. Dorsey (1904-1937), Los Angeles City Council member, 1937
- Earl C. Gay (1902-1975), Los Angeles City Council member, 1933-1945
- Leroy Milton Grider (1854-1919), California real-estate developer
- William J. Hunsaker (1855-1933), mayor of San Diego, 1887-1888; prominent attorney
- Albert F. Jones (1858-1920), California state senator, 1887-1890
- Walter Knott (1889-1981), founder of Knott's Berry Farm
- Joseph R. Knowland (1873-1966), politician and newspaper publisher
- Charles W. Lyon (1887-1960), Speaker of the California Assembly (1946-1946)
- Valentine S. McClatchy (1857-1938), newspaper owner and journalist
- Richard M. Nixon (1913-1994), 37th President of the United States, 1969-1974
- Joe Oeschger (1892-1986), major league baseball pitcher
- Angelo J. Rossi (1878-1948), mayor of San Francisco, 1931-1944
- James Francis Smith (1859-1928), Brigadier General, Governor-General of the Philippines, 1906-1909
- Earl Warren (1891-1974), Governor of California, 1943-1953; Chief Justice of the United States, 1953-1969
- Stephen M. White (1853-1901), U.S. Senator, 1893-1899

== Buildings ==
- Methodist Episcopal Church of Pescadero, a home of NSGW and NDGW, listed on the National Register of Historic Places
- Jackson Downtown Historic District, includes a NSGW hall, listed on the National Register

== See also ==
- Native Daughters of the Golden West
- Anti-Japanese sentiment in the United States
- E Clampus Vitus
