= William Whittingham Lyman =

American winemaker

William Whittingham Lyman Sr. (born July 28, 1850, in Pittsburgh, Pennsylvania – 1921) was the son of Theodore Benedict Lyman. For ten years, until he was twenty, he traveled around Europe with his family. He built one of the first wineries in the Napa Valley in 1871, the Lyman winery, now known as the El Molino winery. At one point Lyman owned the property and surrounding land of what is now the Bale Grist Mill State Historic Park later donated for public use by the Lyman family. He helped found Grace Episcopal Church of St. Helena, California. Lyman was a lieutenant colonel in the state militia, as well as a member of Governor Washington Bartlett's staff and aide-de-camp. He was honored with the office of Grand Patriarch of the St. Helena Odd Fellows lodge in 1878. In 1882 he co-founded the Bank of St. Helena after meeting with other local wine growers. He was married in Sacramento, in 1880, to Mrs. Sarah A. Nowland (later Sarah Amis Lyman). They had two sons: Theodore Benedict Jr. and William Whittingham Lyman Jr.

== Career ==
He resided at his birthplace until 1860, when he, with his parents, went to Europe and remained there for ten years. During this time, he was educated at the School of Mines, at Freiberg, Saxony, and at the University of Berlin. In December 1870, he returned to America, and in 1871, he came to California, where he engaged in wine-making, general farming, milling etc. He was known to have brought the first orange trees into the St.Helena area in Napa Valley. Mr. Lyman was the Secretary and an investor of the Napa Valley Wine Company, one of the most extensive companies engaged in the wine business in the State.

== Education ==
He attended schools throughout Germany and England, including the College of St. Peter at Radley, TU Bergakademie Freiberg, and the University of Berlin.
