= Mountain Cemetery =

Historic cemetery in Sonoma County, California

- U.S. National Register of Historic Places
- U.S. National Historic Landmark District
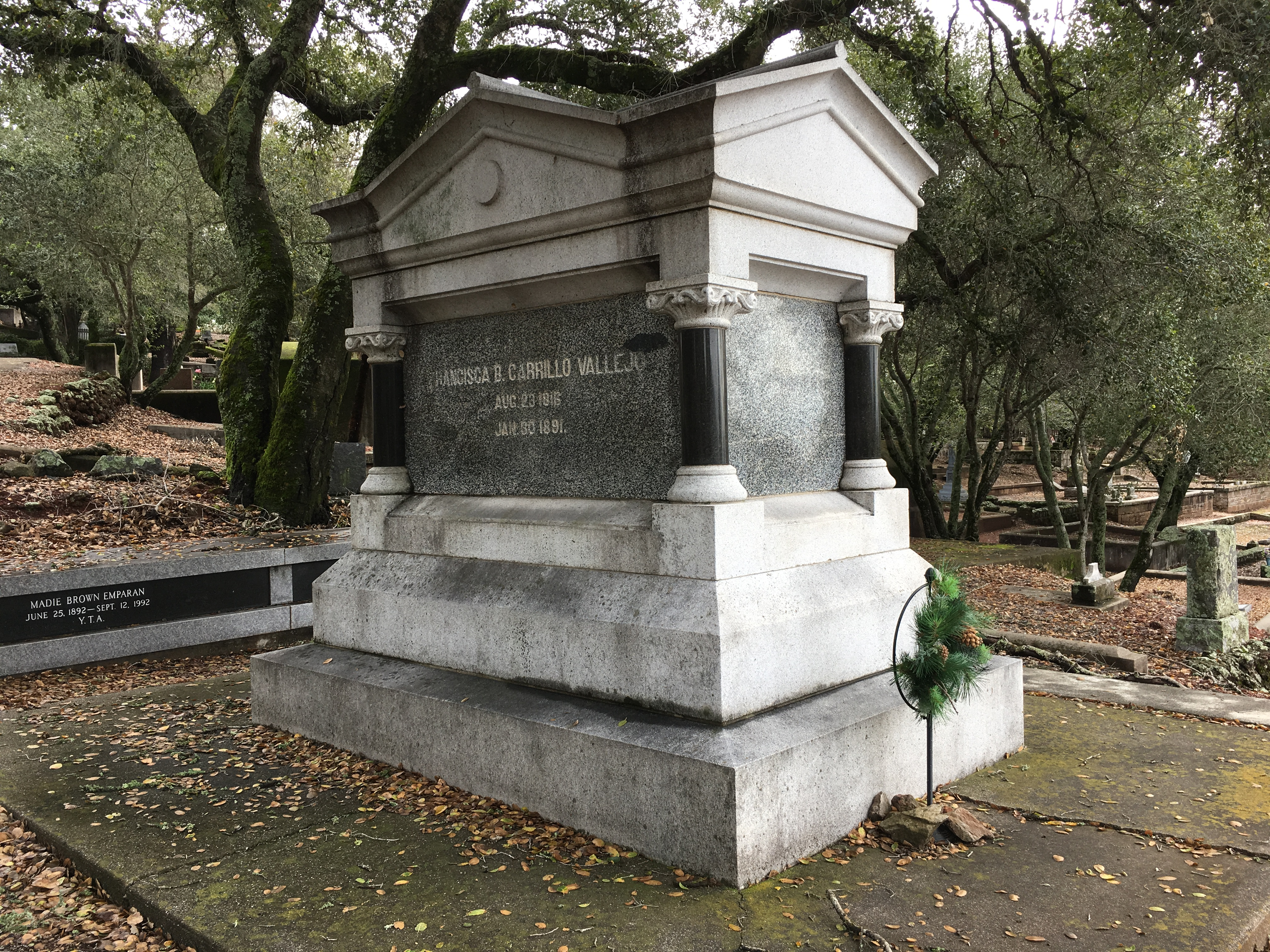
- The grave of Francisca Benicia Carrillo de Vallejo and Mariano Guadalupe Vallejo

- Location within California Location within the United States
- Location: Sonoma, California
- Coordinates: 38°17′58.66″N 122°27′22.45″W
- Built: 1841
- NRHP reference No.: 75000489

Significant dates
- Added to NRHP: April 3, 1975
- Designated NHLD: December 19, 1960

Mountain Cemetery is a cemetery located in Sonoma, California in the United States. Founded in 1841, it is located in the Sonoma Plaza Historic District, which is located on the National Register of Historic Places.

== History ==
Exact origins aside, locals and visitors alike are taken by the authentic historic atmosphere of what is essentially an enchanting city park. Here in our back yard, the fabric of the town’s rich history is hidden right in plain sight.

— Fred Allebach, 2017

The 80 acres (32 ha) that comprise Mountain Cemetery were owned by Mariano Guadalupe Vallejo. Vallejo eventually sold the acreage to numerous individuals. While the earliest burials at the site started in the 1840s, the origins of the cemetery's founding, and how the land was donated to the City, remains unknown. The cemetery is located on the southeastern side of Schocken Hill and a few blocks off the Sonoma Plaza to the northwest. Of the 80 acres (32 ha), most are very rocky and only about 20 acres (8.1 ha) are useable.

Mountain Cemetery's burials include William Smith, the only known Revolutionary War veteran buried in the state of California and the oldest proven burial in the cemetery; Mariano and Francisca Vallejo; and local families who have influenced the food and wine industry, including the founder of Sebastiani Vineyards, Samuele Sebastiani. A Native American child is also buried in the cemetery, which is rare given that an estimated 900 Californian Native peoples are believed to be buried half a mile away in unmarked graves near Mission San Francisco Solano. Two members of the Donner Party are also buried in the cemetery.

The oldest graves and retaining walls were built by hand by stonemasons. The style, which includes mortar joints and the use of basalt, reflects the stonework seen in select 19th-century buildings, walls, and bridges in Sonoma. The basalt used to build the early walls and gravesites was likely sourced from now defunct quarries on Schocken Hill.

Mountain Cemetery is owned, operated, and maintained by the City of Sonoma with the support of local volunteers. Much of the older sections of the cemetery are overgrown and in disrepair. The cemetery has repeatedly lost money for the City. Despite having a fund to support the cemetery maintenance and care, the City has subsidized the fund repeatedly from its General Fund. As of 1993, the cemetery cost the City $40,000 to maintain annually, not including security and graffiti removal. That year, a City Councilmember proposed contracting a private company to operate the cemetery. The proposal did not pass. At the end of the 1990s, the City's General Fund lost approximately $500,000 to the maintenance of the cemetery, which has never been recouped.

As of 2005, the annual maintenance for the cemetery was $250,000. In 2006, the Sonoma City Council approved the construction of a half-million dollar mausoleum. The mausoleum added an additional ten years of space with stacked caskets and cremains. Two years later, in 2008, the deficit was $600,000. As of 2018, Mountain Cemetery had cremation niches and above ground full burial crypts available in one mausoleum.

A veterans cemetery is located to the east of Mountain Cemetery's entrance. Despite its proximity, it is not part of Mountain Cemetery.

Numerous hiking trails are located in the cemetery. The Overlook Trail winds past the burial plots and up the hillside into Montini Open Space Preserve. The trail passes by the gravesite of William Montini, Sr., the preserve's namesake. The Toyon Trailhead leads hikers into less visited areas of the cemetery.

== Notable burials ==
- Henry Ernest Boyes, entrepreneur, Navy captain and founder of Boyes Hot Springs
- Mary Fazio (1913-1999), founder of Mary's Pizza Shack
- George Fetters, founder of Fetters Hot Springs
- William Smith (1768–1846), ship captain and Revolutionary war veteran
- Mariano Guadalupe Vallejo (1807-1890), military general, politician, and founder of Sonoma
- Francisca Benicia Carrillo de Vallejo (1815-1891), pioneer and wife of Mariano Guadalupe Vallejo

== Gallery ==
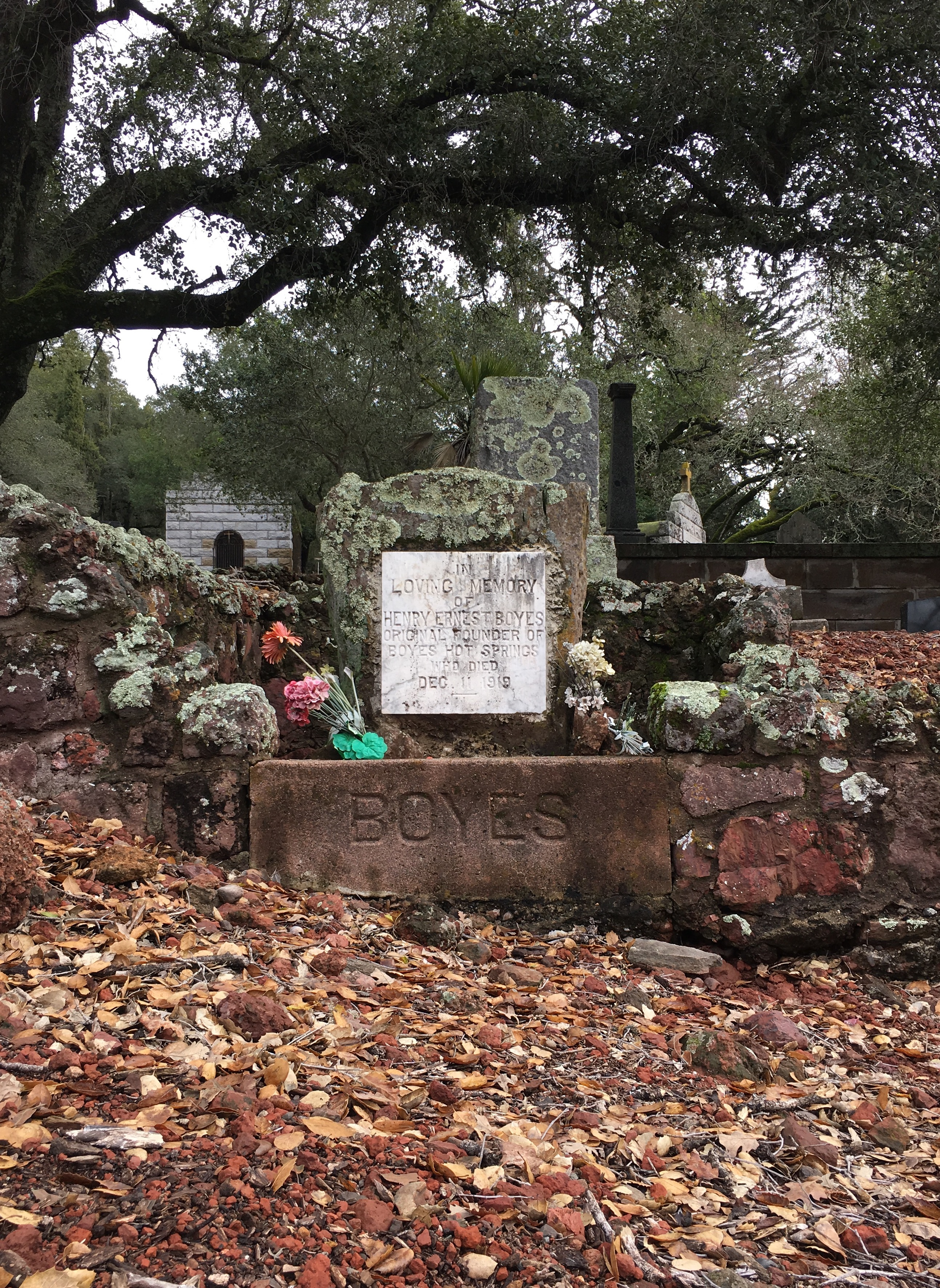
Henry Ernest Boyes

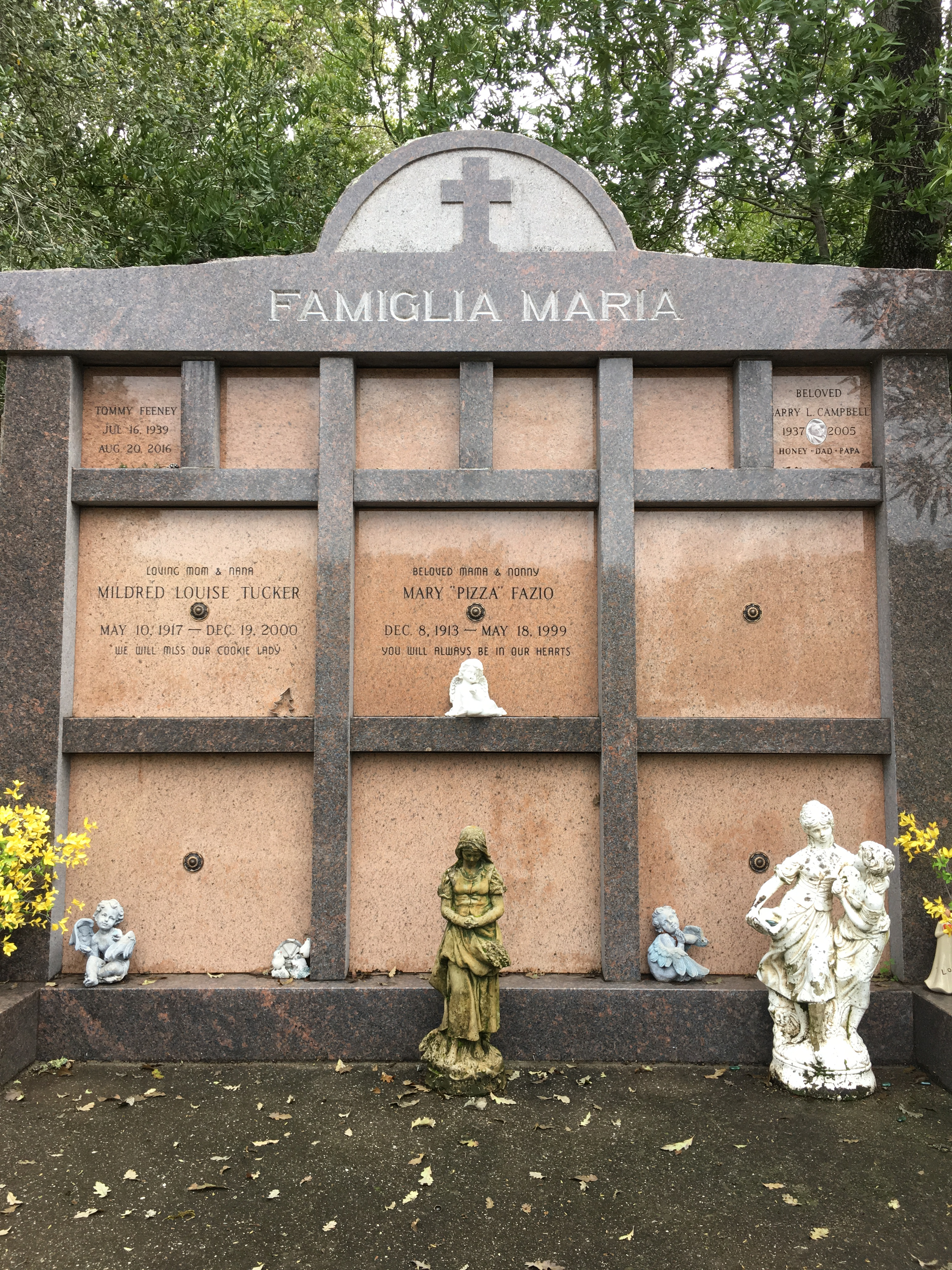
Mary "Pizza" Fazio

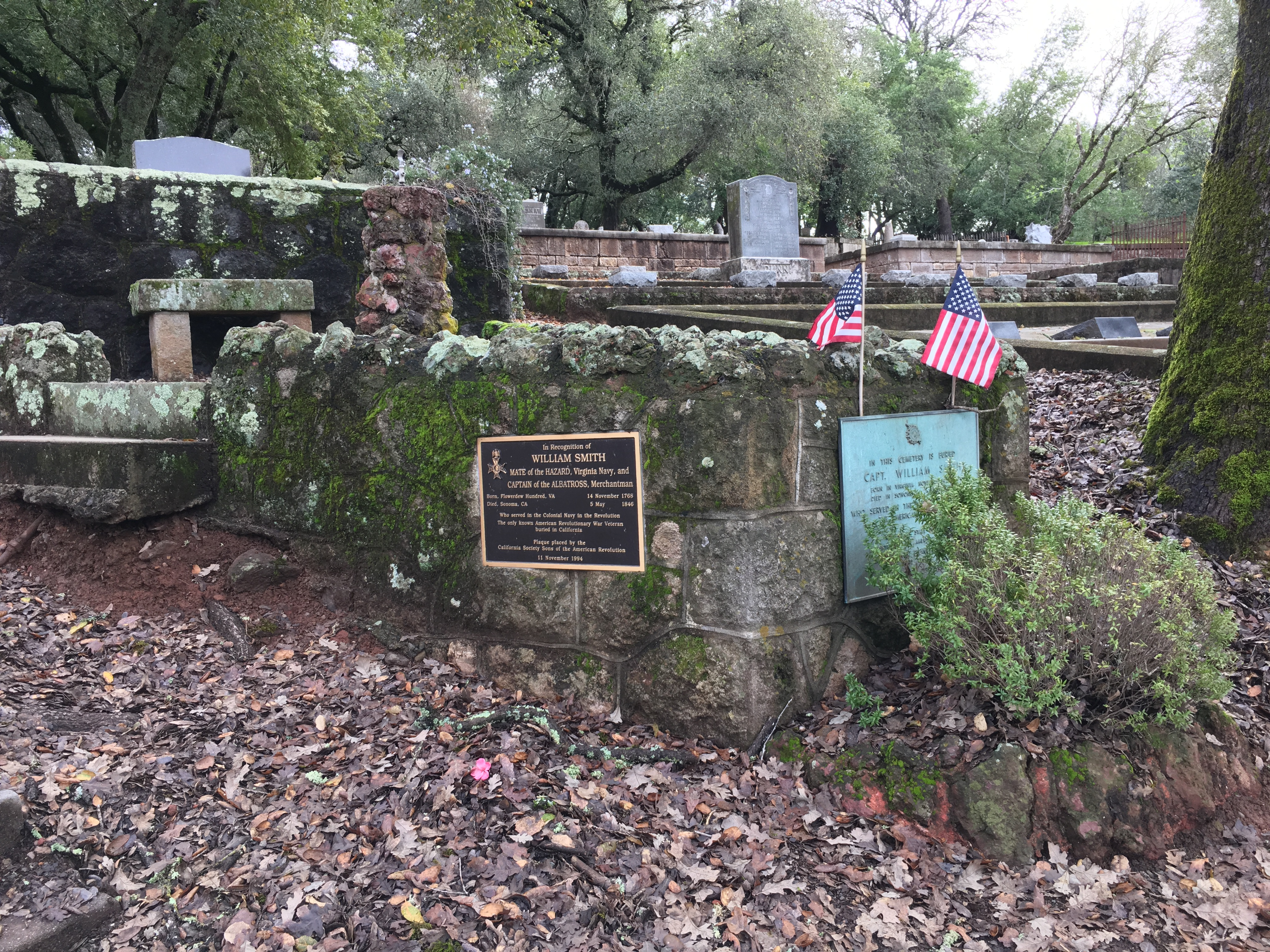
William Smith
