= Juanita Musson =

American restaurateur

- Born: Juanita Lois Hudspeth; October 16, 1923; Texas, U.S.
- Died: February 26, 2011 (aged 87); Sonoma, California, U.S.
- Resting place: Golden Gate; 37°49′N 122°29′W
- Occupation: Restaurateur
- Years active: 1950s–1985
- Organization(s): Juanita's Galley and other restaurants
- Known for: Flamboyant style, large portions of food served
- Spouse: Richard Musson (m. 1944; div. 1957)

Juanita Lois Musson (née Hudspeth; October 16, 1923 – February 26, 2011) was an American restaurateur who, from the 1950s to the 1980s, established and operated eleven restaurants (many of them named Juanita's Galley) in Sausalito, California, and around the San Francisco Bay Area, of which she was a longtime resident.

Called "flamboyant", Musson had a reputation for being kind to animals and the poor, and sometimes rude to her patrons. Drinking frequently, she often argued with and insulted her staff and customers, and was involved in a number of physical altercations. Despite all this she was well-liked. While Musson was careless with money and the management of her restaurants, they gained prominence and popularity for their atmosphere and generous portions.

== Personal life ==
Juanita Lois Hudspeth was born on October 16, 1923, in a rural part of Texas. During her youth, she lived in the southwest United States. In 1944, she married soldier Richard Musson in Wichita Falls, Texas. The Mussons moved to Sausalito, California, in 1946. They divorced in 1957 but remained friends afterward. Richard died in 1987.

Musson was considered to be a "flamboyant and eccentric" woman. She was overweight (over 300 pounds (140 kilograms) at her peak), and always wore a flower-patterned muumuu. Her trademarks were her muumuu and verbal assaults. Journalist Alice Yarish remarked "She was rough and tumble and cussed a lot, but it was always funny. She was mean to everybody, and you liked it."

Musson owned, as pets, a white turkey, monkeys, parrots, deer, chickens, goats, dogs, cats and other creatures that were allowed to wander around her restaurants.

== Career ==
Juanita's Galley...Noted for fabulous breakfast, potluck and the unpredictable disposition of its proprietor, Juanita Musson, who is genial or belligerent with no seeming valuation to tide or events.

— Dining and Wine Guide, San Rafael Daily Independent Journal, January 25, 1962.

In the 1950s, Musson established Juanita's Galley restaurant, which she subsequently moved to a series of locations in Sausalito and adjacent Sonoma County. In 1955 she managed The Ferry Slip Galley, in a building at Gate 5 of the Sausalito pier, for owners Shirley Morgan and Cliff Pedersen. By the beginning of 1956, she was its sole owner, and its name had been shortened to simply The Galley. At that time, the restaurant was included in plans for a marina development by the Marinship Corporation. In September of that year, Musson and her husband Richard filed a "Certificate of Copartners Doing Business Under a Fictitious Name" for a legal change of the business name to Juanita's Galley.

When Musson's lease expired, the 24-hour restaurant and nightclub relocated in May 1962 aboard the Charles Van Damme, a decommissioned paddlewheel ferryboat docked at Waldo Point. Before the end of the year, Musson ran into financial trouble when the Internal Revenue Service filed a $4,497 lien against the business for failure to pay employee withholding taxes. Her difficulties were compounded when the ferryboat's owner Donlon T. Arques filed for eviction of the restaurant for non-payment of rent. The restaurant made front-page headlines on March 16, 1963, when a late-night 40-person melee erupted between a motorcycle club and other patrons; weapons included car jacks, pipes, steel bars, furniture, and a fishbowl. Several people were arrested, and one person was taken to the hospital after being hit in the head with an axe. Musson shut down the restaurant in April after being cited for non-compliance with sanitation laws, and improper sewage disposal. Juanita's Galley was finally evicted from the ferryboat in July. Following her eviction, a $250,000 lawsuit was filed against Musson by the motorcycle club member who had been hit in the head with an axe during the March brawl. In late 1963, a $30,000 lawsuit was filed against her by a woman who claimed to have been injured in a fall at the restaurant.

When Musson relocated to Sonoma County, four hundred people attended her 1964 farewell party at Rico's Restaurant in Sausalito. Her new location was on the grounds of a former rural resort in El Verano. The restaurant's name was shortened to Juanita's, but the cuisine was identical to her Sausalito menu. A kitchen fire destroyed most of the Sonoma County restaurant in 1969. She managed to stay in business, hoping her restaurant could be fully restored, by cooking the food at the nearby Fetters Hot Springs Hotel where she could fall back on her catering license. Musson called what was to be a temporary location "Juanita's North." Temporary turned into a permanent situation, and Musson relocated her restaurant to Fetters Hot Springs. In a bid to raise $35,000 to make an outright purchase of the hotel in 1975, Musson sold her collection of "funky junk and antiques". The next month, an early morning fire burned the hotel and her restaurant to the ground. It was believed that a waitress at the restaurant died in the fire.

Following the hotel fire, Musson's next venture was Juanita's Grist Mill in neighboring Glen Ellen. Musson also established restaurants in Port Costa, Fairfield, Vallejo and Winters. Around 1975, Musson took over "The Warehouse", a restaurant and bar in Port Costa.

Celebrities that frequented Musson's restaurants included the Kingston Trio, Joseph Cotten, the Smothers Brothers, Shelley Berman, Robert Mitchum, and Sally Stanford.

== Later life and death ==
In 1982, Musson retired from the restaurant business and moved back to Sonoma, where she lived mainly on Social Security benefits. In 2002, friends raised enough money for her to move to a retirement community in Agua Caliente. On February 26, 2011, she died at the Sonoma Valley Hospital, where she had been living since suffering a stroke, at the age of 87.

== See also ==
- List of American restaurateurs
