= William Smith (ship captain) =

American ship captain and Revolutionary War veteran

- Born: November 14, 1768; Flowerdew Hundred Plantation, Virginia, United States
- Died: May 5, 1846 (aged 77); Sonoma, California, United States
- Resting place: Mountain Cemetery, Sonoma, California

William Smith (1768–1846) was an American ship captain and Revolutionary War veteran. He is the only known Revolutionary War veteran buried in the state of California.

== Early life ==
William Smith was born in 1768 in Flowerdew Hundred Plantation in Virginia.

== Military and career ==
When Smith was 11 years old he joined the Virginia Navy alongside his father. Together, the two served on the Tartar and the Manly.

In 1789, he went to the West Indies 23 times as a captain of a merchant ship. Smith worked for Bryant & Sturgis, a mercantile based in Boston, where he resided. He traveled to California for the company in 1800. In California he befriended George Vancouver. In 1810, he sailed to Guangzhou, China to deliver 63,000 otter and seal skins from the Farallon Islands. In 1816, he returned to California after working in Hawaii and Southeast Asia, where he participated in the sandalwood trade.

In California, he became captain of the Albatross. While traveling along the California coast, Smith stopped to get provisions. He and a four of the ship's crew were detained by Spaniards who believed the men were smugglers. The Albatross shipwrecked in the Pacific Northwest and Smith lost all of his belongings. He returned briefly to Boston in 1819 and then returned to California, where he settled in Sonoma, California in the 1840s.

== Death and legacy ==
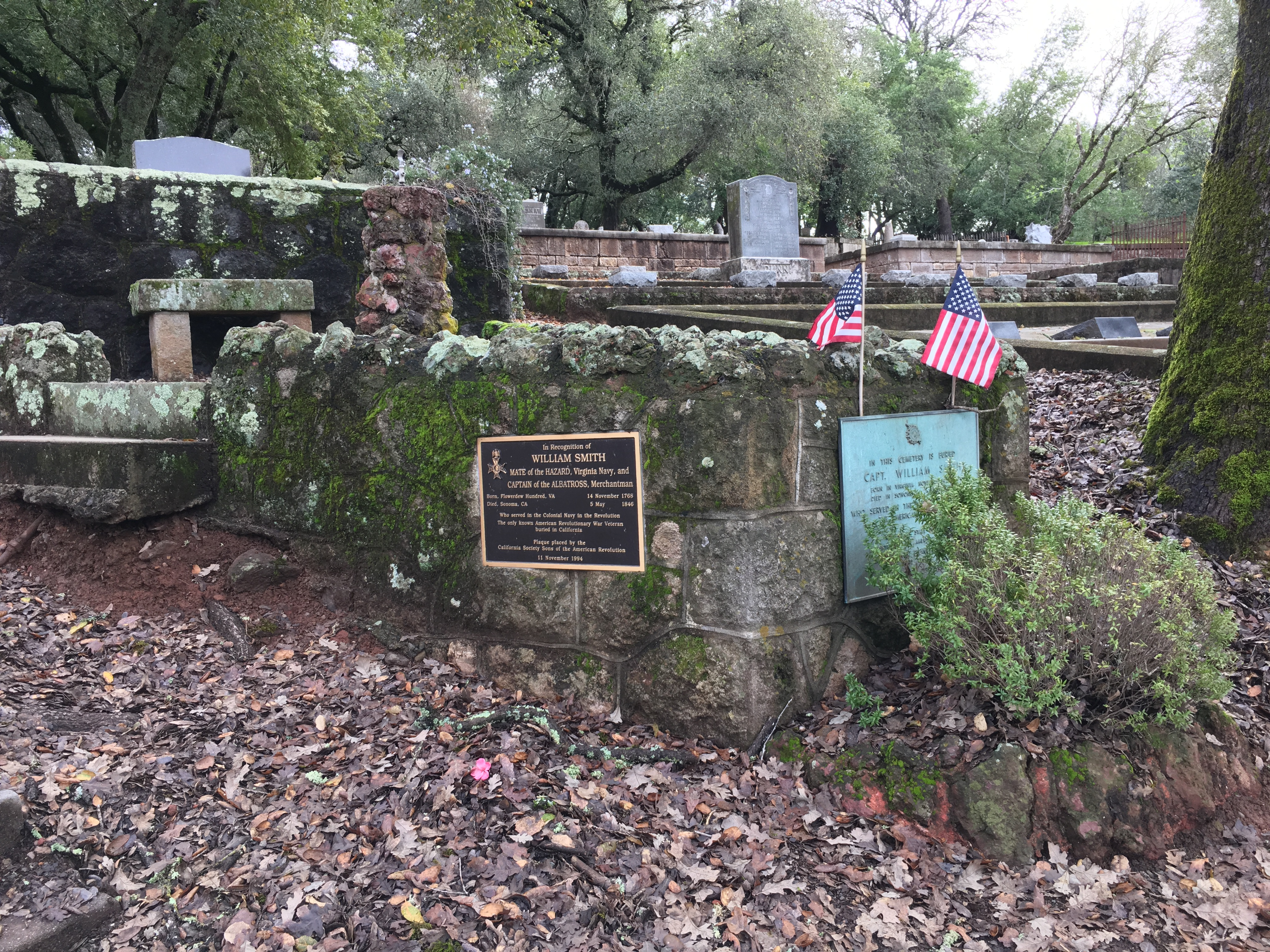
The presumed grave of William Smith in Sonoma, California

Smith died on May 5, 1846, at the home of Jacob P. Leese in Sonoma. Leese informed the United States Consulate in Monterey, California about Smith's death in a letter dated May 8. In the letter, Leese said that Smith was buried "on the South Cide of the Sonoma Mountain North of the Town in a verry Noted Place." The exact location of Smith's grave was unsuccessfully sought by the Sons of the American Revolution, who created a monument near the presumed site at Mountain Cemetery in Sonoma. He is the only veteran of the American Revolution believed to be buried in California.
