= Shotsie Gorman =

American tattoo artist, painter and sculptor (1951–2025)

- Gorman tattooing a man's torso
- Born: Carl Gorman; December 11, 1951; Paterson, New Jersey, U.S.
- Died: February 25, 2025 (aged 73)
- Known for: Tattooing; Poetry; Painting; Sculpture
- Spouse: Kristine Gorman
- Website: tarotarttattoo.com

Carl "Shotsie" Gorman (December 11, 1951 – February 25, 2025) was an American tattoo artist, painter, sculptor and poet. He was a professional tattoo artist for over 45 years and was the co-founder of the Alliance of Professional Tattooists. As a poet, Gorman was a second-place winner of the Allen Ginsberg Poetry Award in 1998 for his poem "Grandpa's Kitchen Tricks".

== Early life and education ==
Carl Gorman was born in Paterson, New Jersey, on December 11, 1951. His nickname is a German word meaning "Sweetie". As a child, his family lived in the Brook Sloate housing project for a time. His father was a police officer. Gorman's father considered art an inappropriate career for a man to pursue. According to Gorman, his father considered the word "artist" a euphemism for homosexual. Gorman hid his interest in art from his parents. His father expected him to become a police officer.

As a child, Gorman was riding the bus with his mother when she pointed out the man sitting in front of them. It was the poet Allen Ginsberg, a regular visitor to Paterson. The poet would be a major influence on Gorman's work as an adult. Gorman played baseball in middle school. In 1964, he had a grand slam and helped lead the team to a state championship in 1964.

After he graduated from John F. Kennedy High School in 1969, Gorman expressed interest in attending art school. His father did not support him in that endeavor. Gorman worked an office job, quitting after three years. He eventually moved to SoHo in New York City and began working with artists. He learned sculpture and carpentry and sought work as an actor. He taught painting and sculpture at Choate Rosemary Hall in Wallingford, Connecticut for a summer semester. A friend took him to a tattoo studio around 1976. At the studio, Gorman perused a book about Japanese tattooing, which was the catalyst for him pursuing a career in tattooing.

== Career ==
=== Tattooing ===
Shotsie Gorman began tattooing in the 1970s in New York City when tattooing was still illegal in the city. Self-taught, he learned how to draw flash influenced by photographs he'd find in old wedding albums he'd buy at flea markets. He did not undergo a formal apprenticeship, which is industry standard. The first tattoo he gave was to a man who wanted three roses and a snake to celebrate the birth of his brother's triplets. Gorman's hands shook during the session and he suffered from nightmares in the wake of it.

Gorman began publishing Tattoo Advocate in 1988, a bi-annual magazine that promoted tattooing, politics, art criticism, history and short fiction. He operated a tattoo shop in Haledon, New Jersey, called Shotsie's Tattoos. One journalist described Shotsie's Tattoos "more like a hair salon than a stereotypical seedy tattoo parlor depicted in movies." Classical music played while Gorman worked on clients. It was estimated, as of 1995, that he had tattooed over 60,000 people at this point in his career. That same year, he held a tattoo fundraiser for a local homeless shelter, raising $10,000 by giving people tattoos. During this time, tattooing was illegal in certain jurisdictions in New Jersey. Gorman met with Bill Pascrell to advocate for tattoo artists to require licenses to weed out amateurs and help further legitimize the art form. He continues to advocate for tattoo artist's rights.

By 1991, Gorman had re-located Shotsie's Tattoo to Wayne, New Jersey, and opened a second shop in West Milford, New Jersey. At that time, Gorman charged up to $200 an hour for tattooing. The majority of Gorman's clients were business professionals, which he described to The New York Times as "wearing their $1,000 suits. But they take their clothes off, they're covered with tattoos."

Gorman sold his Wayne tattoo shop in March 2006. The shop still operates today with the name Shotsie's Tattoos. He moved to Sedona, Arizona, where he focused on his painting career.

Gorman moved to Sonoma, California, in 2007. He opened tattoo shop in Boyes Hot Springs in 2014. The shop, Tarot Art & Tattoo Gallery, also doubles as an art gallery and tarot salon operated by his wife, Kristine. That year, the couple started the annual Ugly Tattoo Contest in Sonoma in 2015. Funds raised from the event benefit nonprofits and feature a competition, judged by tattoo artists, with the winner with the ugliest tattoo winning a prize. In 2018, Gorman spoke at the Contemporary Jewish Museum, alongside Lyle Tuttle, as part of the museum's Porchlight series in support of the exhibition Lew the Jew and His Circle: Origins of American Tattoo..

Gorman was named one of the "50 most innovative artists on the planet" by Tattoo Flash magazine in 2015. In March 2017, filmmaker Tim Wetzel produced Birdnan, a short film starring Gorman. The film was featured at the Sonoma International Film Festival. After the October 2017 Northern California wildfires, Sonoma County used the term "Sonoma Strong" to promote rebuilding and community building in the wake of the destructive wildfires. Gorman held an all day event at his tattoo shop, tattooing "Sonoma Strong" on people with proceeds benefiting wildfire relief efforts.

When the COVID-19 pandemic required Gorman to close his tattoo shop in March 2020, he worried that the business would close. It was the first time in his career that his tattoo business was under threat to close due to finances. He received only $500 from the Paycheck Protection Program and was declined state unemployment benefits. He reached out to Assembly-member Cecilia Aguiar-Curry, who helped him secure unemployment benefits. Gorman credits the unemployment benefits in helping him keep his business afloat until he was able to reopen in the fall of 2020. Gorman met with Sonoma County health officials and advocated for tattoo shops to remain open during the pandemic due to the strict health and safety guidelines the shops are required to follow.

In April 2022, Gorman closed his shop in California and relocated to Philadelphia. Eventually he began working at Mercury Tattoo Studio in Doylestown, Pennsylvania, with owners Scott Bramble and Frank Guthier.

==== Process and style ====
Gorman had at length discussions with clients before tattooing them, finalizing designs while ensuring the client's commitment to getting the tattoo. He would not hesitate to try to talk a client out of a tattoo or decline to give a tattoo, if necessary, particularly if he believed the client may regret it later. Gorman would not tattoo company logos or pieces that are racist, sexist, anti-Semitic, homophobic, or otherwise discriminatory in nature.

He used photorealism in much of his tattoo work and was notable for oversized portraits. One of his most notable pieces is a full back portrait of Charles Lindbergh which took 33 hours to complete. Gorman also tattooed large works of James Dean, Our Lady of Guadalupe, Che Guevara, and Ferdinand Magellan.

He tattooed members of Talking Heads, Murphy's Law and the Allman Brothers. Gorman and his work was featured on Geraldo, The Howard Stern Show, Sally, The Morton Downey Jr. Show, Good Morning America, CBS Overnight News, and Today in New York and in Health, the New York Times, Newsweek, New York Daily News, and the Associated Press.

=== Poetry ===
Gorman cited Allen Ginsberg as an influence. When Gorman was a teenager, he saw Ginsberg perform at the Bottom of the Barrel Cafe in New Jersey. Gorman studied poetry with Mark Doty.

He published the retrospective The Black Marks He Made : Poetry in 1999. Gorman was named a second-place winner of the Allen Ginsberg Poetry Award and selected work from the book was published in the Paterson Literary Review in 1999. Gorman read poetry at the Knitting Factory, the School of Visual Arts, the Paterson Museum, and New Jersey City University.

=== Painting and sculpture ===
Gorman worked out of his home studio. New Jersey City University held a retrospective of Gorman's art and tattoos in 1998. After initially retiring from tattooing in 2006, Gorman moved to Sedona, Arizona, where he had an art gallery and studio for a brief time before moving to California.

Gorman's work was featured in the group exhibition "Purely Abstract: Visions in Line, Form and Color" at the Healdsburg Center for the Arts in 2018. In 2019, Gorman's painting of a hawk flying over vineyards was on the cover of the North Bay Bohemian. In 2020, he participated in "Springtime in the Springs!", a group exhibition. His mural featuring a lizard and California poppies was displayed along Highway 12 in Boyes Hot Springs.

== Personal life and death ==
His nickname "Shotsie" is a version of the German word schatzi which means treasure or sweetie. Over sixty percent of Shotsie Gorman's body was tattooed. One of his tattoos was a portrait of Gandhi. He was a Democrat.

Gorman lived in rural Orange County, New York, for many years with his first wife, Janet.

He moved to Sonoma, California, in 2007. Prior to Sonoma, he lived in Sedona. Gorman was married to Kristine Gorman, a tarot reader and artist. In 2022, the couple moved to Philadelphia.

Gorman died on February 25, 2025, at the age of 73. His death was announced by his wife, Kristine.
