= Temelec, California =

Temelec
- census-designated place
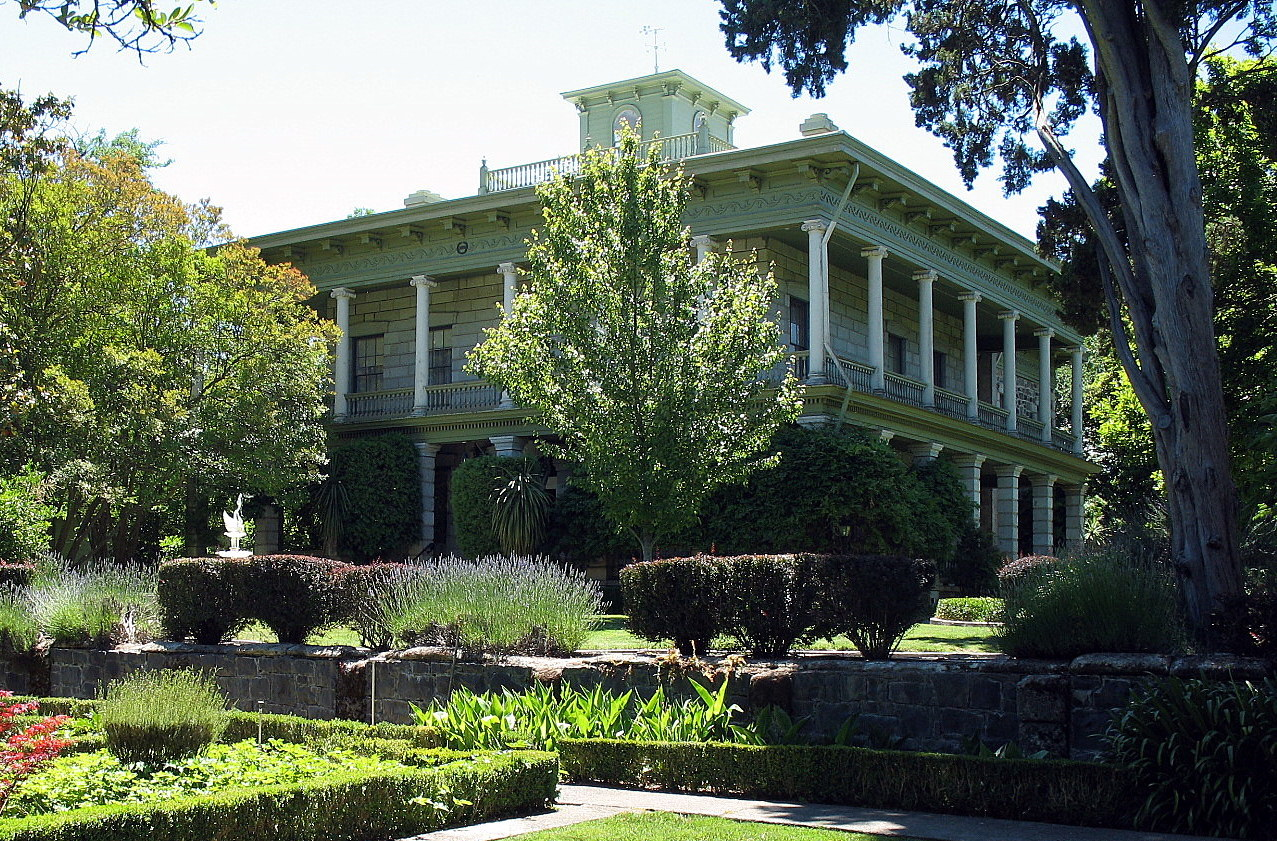
- Temelec Hall

- Location in Sonoma County and the state of California
- Coordinates: 38°16′0″N 122°29′34″W
- Country: United States
- State: California
- County: Sonoma

Area
  - Total: 1.588 sq mi (4.112 km^{2})
  - Land: 1.588 sq mi (4.112 km^{2})
  - Water: 0 sq mi (0 km^{2}) 0%
- Elevation: 98 ft (30 m)

Population (2020)
  - Total: 1,500
  - Density: 940/sq mi (360/km^{2})
- Time zone: UTC-8 (PST)
  - Summer (DST): UTC-7 (PDT)
- ZIP code: 95476
- Area code: 707
- FIPS code: 06-78126
- GNIS feature ID: 1799782

California Historical Landmark
- Reference no.: 237

Temelec (Miwok: Tamuleko) is a census-designated place (CDP) in Sonoma County, California, United States. The population was 1,500 at the 2020 census.

== Temelec Hall ==
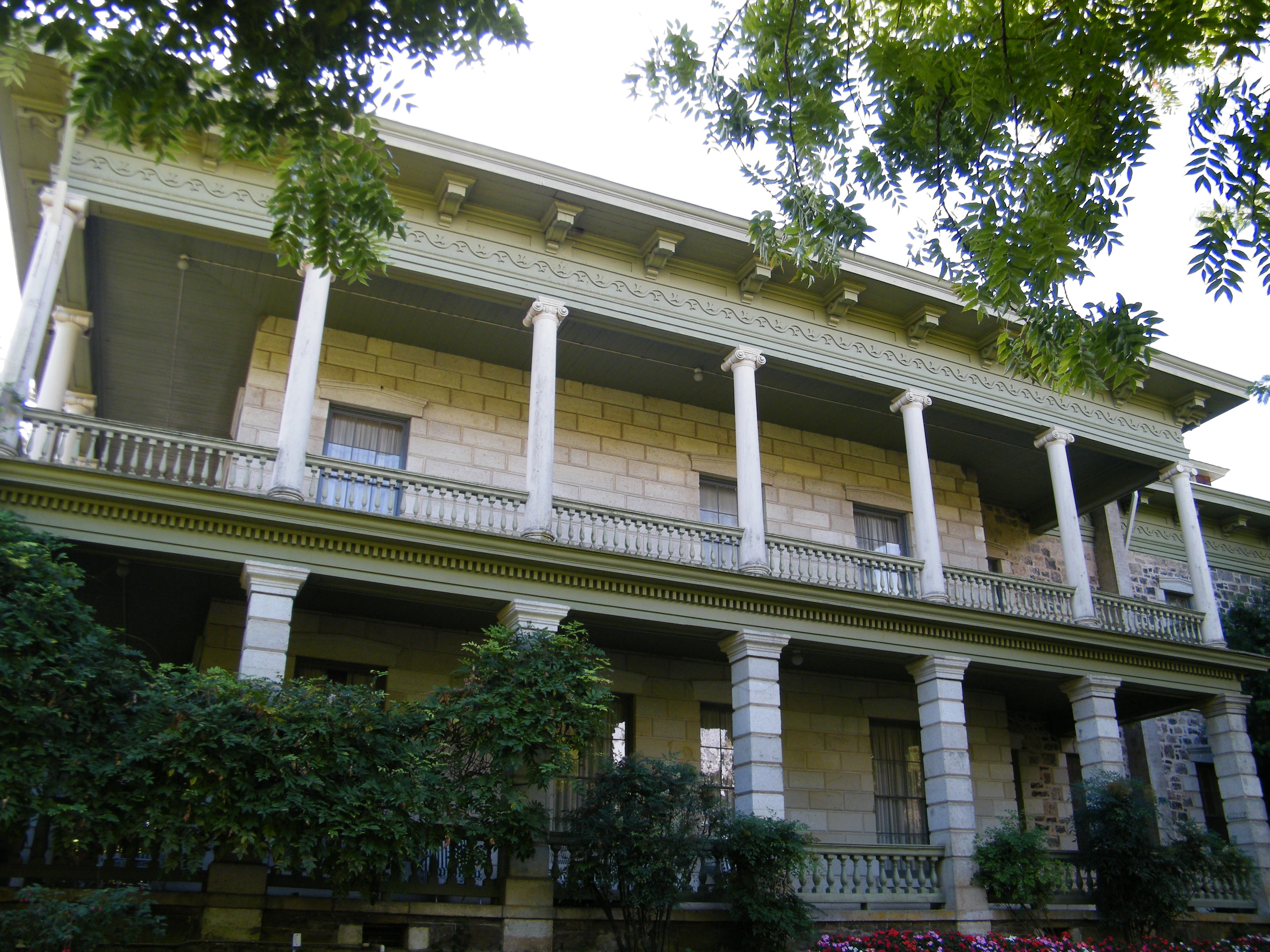
Temelec Hall

Temelec is the site of Temelec Hall, built in 1858 by Captain Granville P. Swift, a member of the Bear Flag Party. The hall was owned by journalist Edmond Coblentz in the mid-1900s. The hall is currently part of the Temelec Adult Community Center. Located at 220 Temelec Circle, it was designated California Historical Landmark #237. It is additionally a Sonoma County Historic Landmark.

== Geography ==
According to the United States Census Bureau, the CDP has a total area of 1.6 square miles (4.1 km^{2}), all land.

== Demographics ==
Historical population
Census	Pop.	Note	%±
1990	1,594		—
2000	1,556		−2.4%
2010	1,441		−7.4%
2020	1,500		4.1%
U.S. Decennial Census; 1860–1870 1880-1890; 1900 1910 1920; 1930 1940 1950; 1960 1970 1980; 1990 2000 2010; 2020

=== Racial and ethnic composition ===
Temelec CDP, California – Racial and ethnic composition Note: the US Census treats Hispanic/Latino as an ethnic category. This table excludes Latinos from the racial categories and assigns them to a separate category. Hispanics/Latinos may be of any race.
Race / Ethnicity (NH = Non-Hispanic)	Pop 2000	Pop 2010	Pop 2020	% 2000	% 2010	% 2020
White alone (NH)	1,464	1,314	1,342	94.09%	91.19%	89.47%
Black or African American alone (NH)	1	4	5	0.06%	0.28%	0.33%
Native American or Alaska Native alone (NH)	6	3	2	0.39%	0.21%	0.13%
Asian alone (NH)	27	31	43	1.74%	2.15%	2.87%
Native Hawaiian or Pacific Islander alone (NH)	2	5	0	0.13%	0.35%	0.00%
Other race alone (NH)	0	1	8	0.00%	0.07%	0.53%
Mixed race or Multiracial (NH)	15	15	31	0.96%	1.04%	2.07%
Hispanic or Latino (any race)	41	68	69	2.63%	4.72%	4.60%
Total	1,556	1,441	1,500	100.00%	100.00%	100.00%

=== 2020 census ===
As of the 2020 census, Temelec had a population of 1,500 and a population density of 944.6 inhabitants per square mile (364.7/km^{2}).

The Census reported that 100% of the population lived in households. 99.9% of residents lived in urban areas, while 0.1% lived in rural areas.

There were 989 households, out of which 3.2% included children under the age of 18. Of all households, 37.2% were married-couple households, 4.3% were cohabiting couple households, 15.1% had a male householder with no spouse or partner present, and 43.4% had a female householder with no spouse or partner present. 50.2% of households were one person, and 43.2% were one person aged 65 or older. The average household size was 1.52. There were 436 families (44.1% of all households).

The age distribution was 0.7% under the age of 18, 0.5% aged 18 to 24, 2.3% aged 25 to 44, 19.7% aged 45 to 64, and 76.8% aged 65 or older. The median age was 72.3 years. For every 100 females, there were 69.1 males, and for every 100 females age 18 and over there were 69.2 males age 18 and over.

There were 1,050 housing units at an average density of 661.2 units per square mile (255.3 units/km^{2}), of which 989 (94.2%) were occupied and 5.8% were vacant. Of occupied units, 88.5% were owner-occupied and 11.5% were occupied by renters. The homeowner vacancy rate was 0.0%, and the rental vacancy rate was 0.9%.

Racial composition as of the 2020 census
Race	Number	Percent
White	1,366	91.1%
Black or African American	5	0.3%
American Indian and Alaska Native	2	0.1%
Asian	43	2.9%
Native Hawaiian and Other Pacific Islander	0	0.0%
Some other race	19	1.3%
Two or more races	65	4.3%

=== Income and poverty ===
In 2023, the US Census Bureau estimated that the median household income was $73,654, and the per capita income was $65,761. About 0.0% of families and 2.1% of the population were below the poverty line.

=== 2010 census ===
The 2010 United States census reported that Temelec had a population of 1,441. The population density was 907.4 inhabitants per square mile (350.3/km^{2}). The racial makeup of Temelec was 1,376 (95.5%) White, 4 (0.3%) African American, 4 (0.3%) Native American, 31 (2.2%) Asian, 5 (0.3%) Pacific Islander, 5 (0.3%) from other races, and 16 (1.1%) from two or more races. Hispanic or Latino of any race were 68 persons (4.7%).

The Census reported that 100% of the population lived in households.

There were 960 households, out of which 8 (0.8%) had children under the age of 18 living in them, 318 (33.1%) were opposite-sex married couples living together, 45 (4.7%) had a female householder with no husband present, 12 (1.3%) had a male householder with no wife present. There were 30 (3.1%) unmarried opposite-sex partnerships, and 22 (2.3%) same-sex married couples or partnerships. 513 households (53.4%) were made up of individuals, and 398 (41.5%) had someone living alone who was 65 years of age or older. The average household size was 1.50. There were 375 families (39.1% of all households); the average family size was 2.07.

The population was spread out, with 11 people (0.8%) under the age of 18, 4 people (0.3%) aged 18 to 24, 23 people (1.6%) aged 25 to 44, 411 people (28.5%) aged 45 to 64, and 992 people (68.8%) who were 65 years of age or older. The median age was 71.5 years. For every 100 females, there were 63.9 males. For every 100 females age 18 and over, there were 63.6 males.

There were 1,051 housing units at an average density of 661.8 per square mile (255.5/km^{2}), of which 86.7% were owner-occupied and 13.3% were occupied by renters. The homeowner vacancy rate was 3.9%; the rental vacancy rate was 6.5%. 87.2% of the population lived in owner-occupied housing units and 12.8% lived in rental housing units.

== Politics ==
In the state legislature, Temelec is located in the 3rd senatorial district, represented by Democrat Christopher Cabaldon, and in the 12th Assembly district, represented by Democrat Damon Connolly.

Federally, Temelec is in California's 4th congressional district, represented by Democrat Mike Thompson.

== Education ==
The school district is Sonoma Valley Unified School District.

== See also ==
- List of California Historical Landmarks
