= Sonoma Mission Inn =

Historic resort hotel in Sonoma, California

Fairmont Sonoma Mission Inn & Spa
- Location in California Location in United States

General information
- Location: 100 Boyes Blvd, Sonoma, California
- Coordinates: 38.312650°N 122.482980°W

Fairmont Sonoma Mission Inn & Spa, in Sonoma, California, originally known as the Boyes Hot Springs Hotel, is a hotel dating from 1927, now part of Fairmont Hotels and Resorts. It is a Sonoma County historic landmark and a member of Historic Hotels of America.

== Prior use ==
The hotel is located in Boyes Springs, an area of naturally occurring underground hot mineral waters that was considered sacred by Native Americans. The area was first developed commercially by Dr. T.M. Leavenworth in 1840. It was later acquired by Captain H. E. Boyes, whose drilling in 1895 found 112-degree water at a depth of 70 feet, and who developed the Boyes Hot Springs Hotel within a few years. That hotel was destroyed with much of Boyes Springs in a September 1923 wildfire.

== Development ==
The Sonoma Mission Inn was built on the 360-acre Bigelow Ranch. The initial contract for construction of a Spanish Mission-style hotel was signed in November 1926. On opening in August 1927, the property was known as the Boyes Hot Springs Hotel. The hotel was developed by Fred Partridge and Rudolph Lichtenberg at a reported cost of approximately $600,000. Joseph L. Stewart was the architect, and R. W. Littlefield was the contractor.

The hotel's name was changed in February 1928 to the Sonoma Mission Inn. The 238-acre Sonoma Mission Inn Golf Course and Country Club was added in July 1928, built at a cost of more than $250,000. A large bathing pavilion with two auxiliary tanks, each holding 150,000 gallons of water, opened in April 1930.

== Subsequent history ==
In 1930, Sonoma Properties Company, owner of the hotel, filed for bankruptcy, reporting liabilities of $710,500 and assets of $656,982.

During World War II, the hotel was leased by the Navy to serve as a "rest center" for sailors and marines returning from combat duty in the Asiatic-Pacific Theater. In March 1943, 90 veterans of the Guadalcanal campaign were stationed at the hotel, transitioning from one of the most brutal battles in American history to "a make-believe world of downy beds, luxurious bath tubs, a private golf course, cherry pies, free movies, soda pop, swimming pool and dances with girls in fluffy organdy."

The hotel returned to civilian use in October 1945 was purchased that same year by San Francisco hoteliers, E. B. Degolia and George T. Thompson. After a temporary closure for extensive renovation and remodeling, the inn reopened in February 1948. George Thompson became the sole owner at that time.

In 1980, the hotel underwent a $4-million renovation after being purchased for $2.5 million by Ed Safdie. The improvements continued in October 1981 with the opening of The Spa at the Sonoma Mission Inn. By 1984, Safdie's total investment in the property reportedly totaled $10 million.

Safdie sold the inn to Rahn Properties in 1985 for a reported $16.5 million. Rahn closed the inn for remodeling. It was reopened in 1986 with Rahn reporting that it had spent $35 million purchasing, expanding, and remodeling the property.

The property was subsequently acquired by Crescent Real Estate Equities, a Dallas-based REIT. In 2002, Crescent sold a 20% interest in the inn to Fairmont Hotels & Resorts. Fairmont took over management of the property and rebranded it as The Fairmont Sonoma Mission Inn & Spa.
