= Henry Ernest Boyes =

Royal Navy officer and businessman

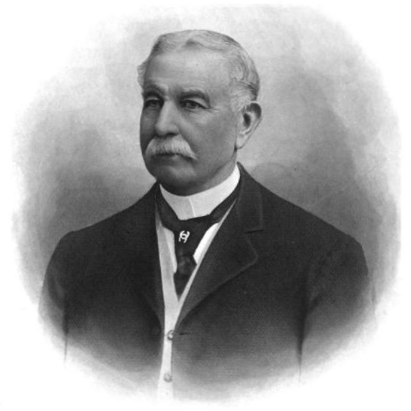
- Born: July 13, 1844; Kingston upon Hull, England, United Kingdom
- Died: December 11, 1919 (aged 75); San Francisco, California, United States
- Resting place: Mountain Cemetery, Sonoma, California
- Citizenship: United States of America
- Known for: Founding of Boyes Hot Springs, California
- Spouse: Antoinette Charlotte Edwards (m. 1883)

Henry Ernest Boyes (1844–1919) was an American entrepreneur and Navy captain. Boyes founded Boyes Hot Springs in California after discovering hot springs on his property.

== Early life ==
Henry Boyes was born into a wealthy family in 1844 in Kingston upon Hull in England. His father was Faulkner Boyes and mother, Margaret Mathilda Saner. He had two brothers. Both died as children. He attended Queen Mary's Grammar School in Ripon.

== Mid-life and career ==
Boyes served in the British Navy from 1858 to 1872. During that time, he served in the Indian Navy for four years in Mumbai. After leaving the Navy, he managed an indigo plantation. He returned to Europe and visited Switzerland, where he met Antoinette Charlotte Edwards. The two married in 1883 in England. Boyes sold his family estate for $250,000 and the couple moved to San Francisco, California.

=== Founding of Boyes Hot Springs ===
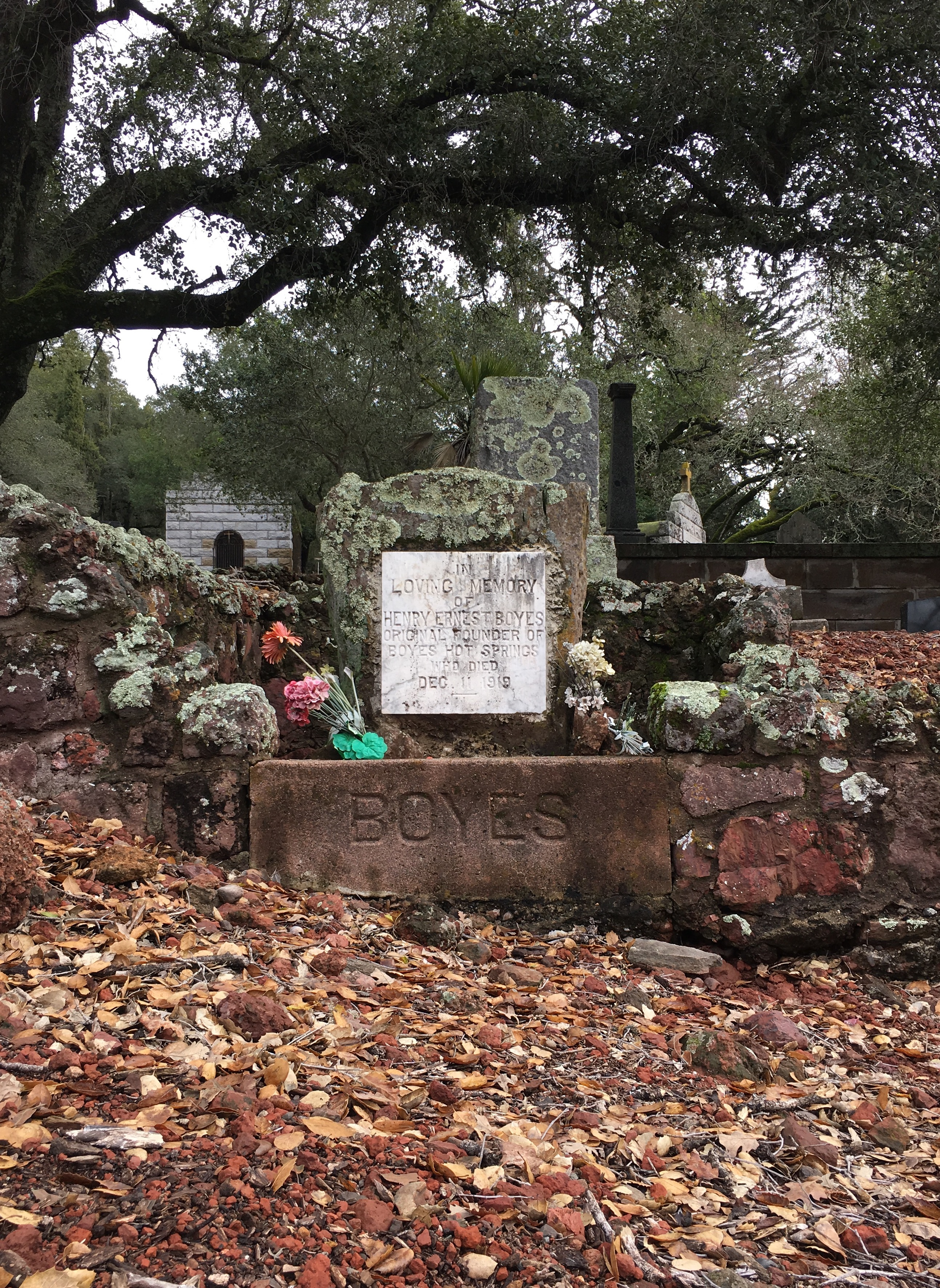
Grave of Henry Boyes in Sonoma, California

In 1883 the Boyes' moved to Sonoma Valley, where they bought 75 acres of land after hearing about the area from Mariano Guadalupe Vallejo. The couple lived on a house that was built in 1849 by T.M. Leavenworth. Eventually, another house was built on a 15-acre part of the property, which the couple named "El Mirador."

Vallejo had told Boyes about natural hot springs in the area and in 1888, Boyes dug two 200 feet deep wells on the property. They pumped the hot water into pools and promoted the therapeutic benefits of the water to the public. They started with one pool, eventually expanding to multiple pools as the site grew in popularity with tourists from San Francisco. The property eventually served as a resort with overnight accommodations. Boyes incorporated the resort as the Boyes' Hot Mineral Springs Co. in 1902. In 1923, the resort was destroyed by a fire. Today, the Fairmont Sonoma Mission Inn & Spa is located on the site of the former Boyes resort.

== Later life and legacy ==
Boyes is buried in Mountain Cemetery in Sonoma. His grave is next to the tomb of Mariano Guadalupe Vallejo.

== Gallery ==
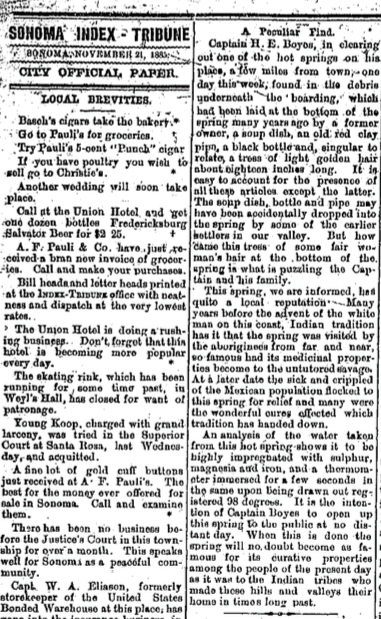
Newspaper clipping from November 1885 when Boyes discovered a spring
