= Sonoma Valley Unified School District =

School district in California, United States

Address
- 17850 Railroad Avenue Sonoma, California, 95476; United States

District information
- Type: Public
- Grades: K–12
- Schools: 11: 5 elementary, 2 middle, 2 high, plus 2 K–8 charter schools
- NCES District ID: 0637200

Students and staff
- Students: 3,503 (2020–2021)
- Teachers: 184.2 (FTE)
- Staff: 264.05 (FTE)
- Student–teacher ratio: 19.02:1

Other information
- Website: sonomaschools.org

Sonoma Valley Unified School District is a public school district based in Sonoma County, California, United States. As of 2017, there are 11 schools.

The district includes Sonoma and the following census-designated places: Boyes Hot Springs, Eldridge, El Verano, Fetters Hot Springs-Agua Caliente, Glen Ellen, and Temelec.
