= El Verano, California =

El Verano
- census-designated place
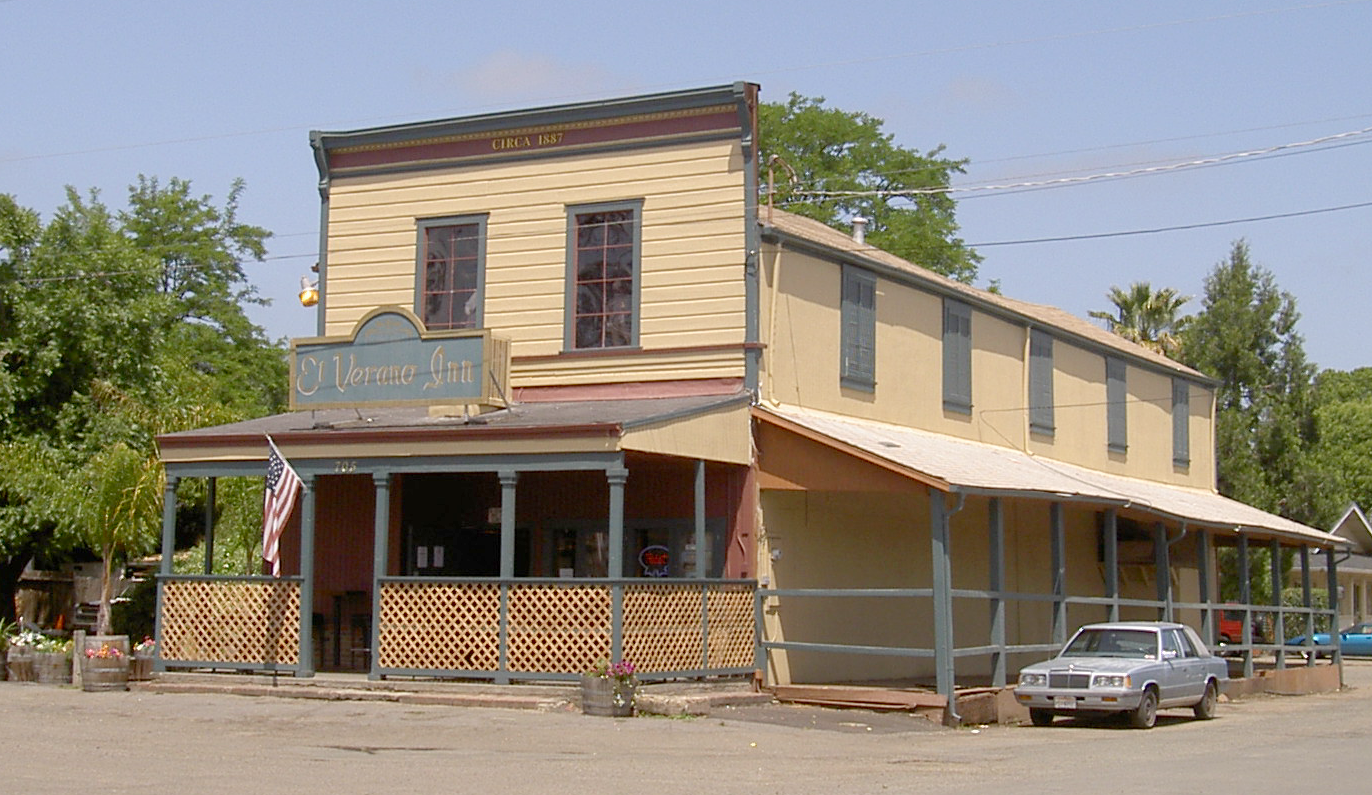
- the El Verano Inn at the corner of Bay and Laurel

- Location in Sonoma County and the state of California
- Coordinates: 38°17′57″N 122°29′17″W
- Country: United States
- State: California
- County: Sonoma

Area
  - Total: 1.144 sq mi (2.964 km^{2})
  - Land: 1.144 sq mi (2.964 km^{2})
  - Water: 0 sq mi (0 km^{2}) 0%
- Elevation: 108 ft (33 m)

Population (2020 Census)
  - Total: 3,867
  - Density: 3,379/sq mi (1,305/km^{2})
- Time zone: UTC-8 (PST)
  - Summer (DST): UTC-7 (PDT)
- ZIP code: 95433
- Area code: 707
- FIPS code: 06-22510
- GNIS feature ID: 0277505

El Verano (Spanish for "The Summer") is a census-designated place (CDP) in Sonoma Valley, Sonoma County, California, United States. The population was 4,123 at the 2010 census, falling to 3,867 at the 2020 census.

== History ==
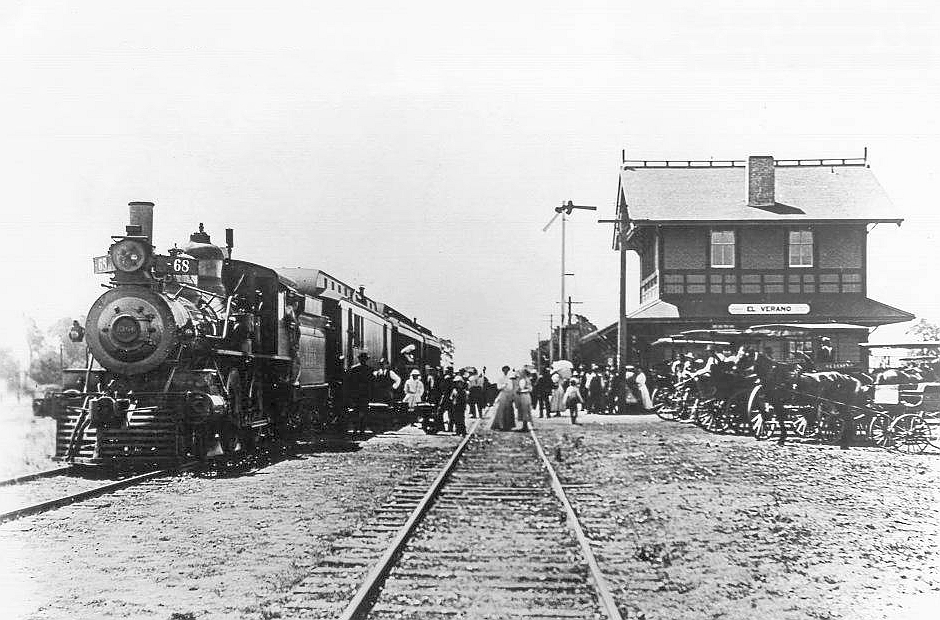
Depot in El Verano, 1890

El Verano's name is Spanish and means "The Summer." Resorts in El Verano, and the other nearby communities of Boyes Hot Springs, Fetters Hot Springs, and Agua Caliente were popular health retreats for tourists from San Francisco and points beyond until the middle of the 20th century because of the geothermic hot springs found in the area.

== Geography ==
El Verano is a western suburb of the city of Sonoma. According to the United States Census Bureau, the CDP has a total area of 1.1 square miles (2.8 km^{2}), all land.

== Demographics ==
Historical population
| Census | Pop. | Note | %± |
|---|---|---|---|
| 1960 | 1,236 | | — |
| 1970 | 1,753 | | 41.8% |
| 1980 | 2,384 | | 36.0% |
| 1990 | 3,498 | | 46.7% |
| 2000 | 3,954 | | 13.0% |
| 2010 | 4,123 | | 4.3% |
| 2020 | 3,867 | | −6.2% |
U.S. Decennial Census; U.S Census 1880-1980, 1860–1870 1880-1890; 1900 1910 1920; 1930 1940 1950; 1960 1970 1980; 1990 2000 2010; 2020

El Verano first appeared as an unincorporated community in the 1960 U.S. census; and then as a census designated place in the 1980 U.S. census.

=== Racial and ethnic composition ===
El Verano CDP, California – Racial and ethnic composition Note: the US Census treats Hispanic/Latino as an ethnic category. This table excludes Latinos from the racial categories and assigns them to a separate category. Hispanics/Latinos may be of any race.
| Race / Ethnicity (NH = Non-Hispanic) | Pop 2000 | Pop 2010 | Pop 2020 | % 2000 | % 2010 | % 2020 |
|---|---|---|---|---|---|---|
| White alone (NH) | 2,829 | 2,345 | 2,061 | 71.55% | 56.88% | 53.30% |
| Black or African American alone (NH) | 11 | 13 | 8 | 0.28% | 0.32% | 0.21% |
| Native American or Alaska Native alone (NH) | 22 | 14 | 5 | 0.56% | 0.34% | 0.13% |
| Asian alone (NH) | 53 | 86 | 92 | 1.34% | 2.09% | 2.38% |
| Native Hawaiian or Pacific Islander alone (NH) | 3 | 12 | 8 | 0.08% | 0.29% | 0.21% |
| Other race alone (NH) | 15 | 0 | 16 | 0.38% | 0.00% | 0.41% |
| Mixed race or Multiracial (NH) | 99 | 94 | 146 | 2.50% | 2.28% | 3.78% |
| Hispanic or Latino (any race) | 922 | 1,559 | 1,531 | 23.32% | 37.81% | 39.59% |
| Total | 3,954 | 4,123 | 3,867 | 100.00% | 100.00% | 100.00% |

=== 2020 census ===
As of the 2020 census, El Verano had a population of 3,867 and a population density of 3,377.3 inhabitants per square mile (1,304.0/km^{2}).

The census reported that 99.7% of the population lived in households, 0.3% lived in non-institutionalized group quarters, and no one was institutionalized. 100.0% of residents lived in urban areas, while 0.0% lived in rural areas.

There were 1,417 households, out of which 31.9% included children under the age of 18, 49.0% were married-couple households, 8.5% were cohabiting couple households, 24.0% had a female householder with no spouse or partner present, and 18.6% had a male householder with no spouse or partner present. 25.8% of households were one person, and 14.5% were one person aged 65 or older. The average household size was 2.72. There were 935 families (66.0% of all households).

The age distribution was 21.6% under the age of 18, 8.1% aged 18 to 24, 24.6% aged 25 to 44, 28.3% aged 45 to 64, and 17.3% who were 65 years of age or older. The median age was 41.3 years. For every 100 females, there were 100.6 males, and for every 100 females age 18 and over, there were 96.5 males age 18 and over.

There were 1,533 housing units at an average density of 1,338.9 units per square mile (517.0 units/km^{2}), of which 1,417 (92.4%) were occupied. Of occupied units, 53.3% were owner-occupied and 46.7% were occupied by renters. 7.6% of housing units were vacant. The homeowner vacancy rate was 0.0%, and the rental vacancy rate was 3.8%.

Racial composition as of the 2020 census
| Race | Number | Percent |
|---|---|---|
| White | 2,280 | 59.0% |
| Black or African American | 9 | 0.2% |
| American Indian and Alaska Native | 51 | 1.3% |
| Asian | 95 | 2.5% |
| Native Hawaiian and Other Pacific Islander | 8 | 0.2% |
| Some other race | 862 | 22.3% |
| Two or more races | 562 | 14.5% |

=== Income and poverty ===
In 2023, the US Census Bureau estimated that the median household income was $119,527, and the per capita income was $48,950. About 2.8% of families and 2.8% of the population were below the poverty line.

=== 2010 census ===
The 2010 United States census reported that El Verano had a population of 4,123. The population density was 3,609.5 inhabitants per square mile (1,393.6/km^{2}). The racial makeup of El Verano was 3,054 (74.1%) White, 22 (0.5%) African American, 22 (0.5%) Native American, 101 (2.4%) Asian, 12 (0.3%) Pacific Islander, 717 (17.4%) from other races, and 195 (4.7%) from two or more races. Hispanic or Latino of any race were 1,559 persons (37.8%).

The 2010 Census reported that 99.5% of the population lived in households and 0.5% lived in non-institutionalized group quarters.

There were 1,466 households, out of which 570 (38.9%) had children under the age of 18 living in them, 732 (49.9%) were opposite-sex married couples living together, 166 (11.3%) had a female householder with no husband present, 96 (6.5%) had a male householder with no wife present. There were 116 (7.9%) unmarried opposite-sex partnerships, and 18 (1.2%) same-sex married couples or partnerships. 334 households (22.8%) were made up of individuals, and 104 (7.1%) had someone living alone who was 65 years of age or older. The average household size was 2.80. There were 994 families (67.8% of all households); the average family size was 3.33.

The population was spread out, with 1,089 people (26.4%) under the age of 18, 330 people (8.0%) aged 18 to 24, 1,136 people (27.6%) aged 25 to 44, 1,173 people (28.5%) aged 45 to 64, and 395 people (9.6%) who were 65 years of age or older. The median age was 35.7 years. For every 100 females, there were 98.3 males. For every 100 females age 18 and over, there were 97.3 males.

There were 1,581 housing units at an average density of 1,384.1 per square mile (534.4/km^{2}), of which 53.6% were owner-occupied and 46.4% were occupied by renters. The homeowner vacancy rate was 1.7%; the rental vacancy rate was 4.1%. 48.7% of the population lived in owner-occupied housing units and 50.8% lived in rental housing units.

== Government ==
In the state legislature, El Verano is in the 3rd Senate District, represented by Democrat Christopher Cabaldon, and in the 4th State Assembly District, represented by Democrat Cecilia Aguiar-Curry. Federally, El Verano is in California's 4th congressional district, represented by Democrat Mike Thompson.

== Education ==
The school district is Sonoma Valley Unified School District.
