= Fetters Hot Springs-Agua Caliente, California =

Fetters Hot Springs-Agua Caliente
- census-designated place
- Location in Sonoma County and the state of California
- Coordinates: 38°19′19″N 122°29′10″W
- Country: United States
- State: California
- County: Sonoma

Area
  - Total: 1.461 sq mi (3.784 km^{2})
  - Land: 1.461 sq mi (3.784 km^{2})
  - Water: 0 sq mi (0 km^{2}) 0%
- Elevation: 154 ft (47 m)

Population (2020)
  - Total: 4,233
  - Density: 2,897/sq mi (1,119/km^{2})
- Time zone: UTC-8 (PST)
  - Summer (DST): UTC-7 (PDT)
- ZIP code: 95416
- Area code: 707
- FIPS code: 06-23973
- GNIS feature ID: 2408209

Fetters Hot Springs-Agua Caliente is a census-designated place (CDP) in Sonoma Valley, Sonoma County, California, United States. As of the 2020 census, the CDP population was 4,233. The name Agua Caliente translates into English, from Spanish, as hot water, referring to the hot springs historically found in the area.

== Geography ==
Generally considered separate from one another, Fetters Hot Springs and Agua Caliente are adjacent communities located along the Sonoma Highway (State Route 12), approximately 2.5 miles (4.0 km) northwest of Sonoma, and immediately north of Boyes Hot Springs and El Verano. Over time, the boundaries between these four communities became blurred and they are often grouped together and referred to collectively as "the Springs" area of Sonoma Valley.

As of the 2020 census, the CDP had a total area of 1.5 sq mi (3.9 km^{2}), all land.

== History ==
The area was first occupied by Indigenous peoples who discovered and used the hot springs that the area is named after. The Mexican government deeded 50,000 acres to Lazaro Piña as Rancho Agua Caliente, a land grant 10 miles (16 km) long on the east side of Sonoma Creek, in 1840. In 1849 Thaddeus M. Leavenworth acquired 320 acres of the Rancho in what became present-day Agua Caliente, Fetters Hot Springs, Boyes Hot Springs, and part of Maxwell Farm. In 1889, property was being sold in the area as being near the "celebrated old Indian Medicine Spring."

George and Emma Fetters opened the Fetters Hot Springs resort in 1908. Flamboyant restaurateur Juanita Musson opened her second Sonoma Valley restaurant in the old Fetters hotel around 1970, but it burned to the ground five years later. The land stood vacant for almost forty years until the Fetters Apartments, built as affordable housing for sixty families, opened in 2017.

== Gallery ==
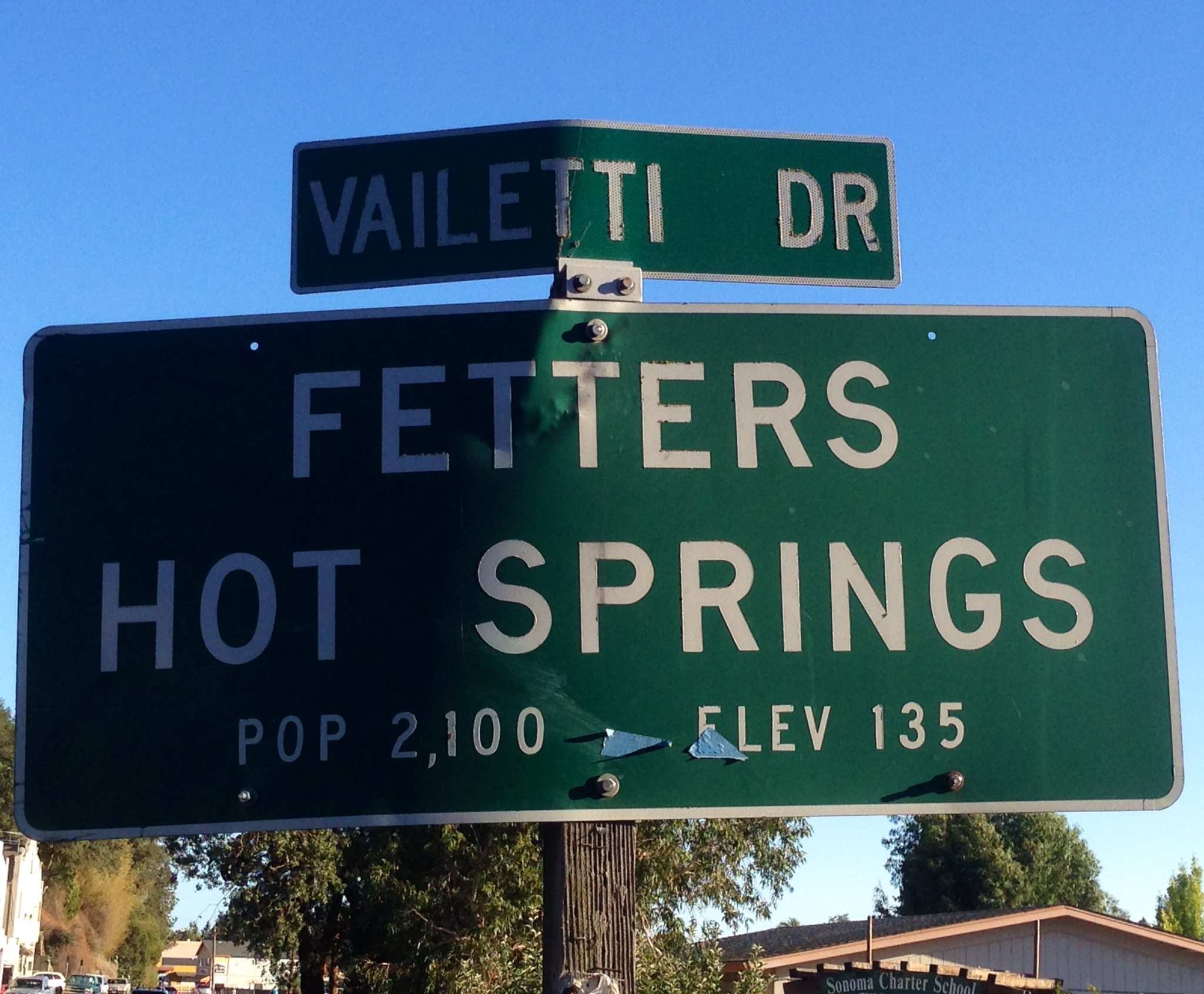
Fetters Hot Springs

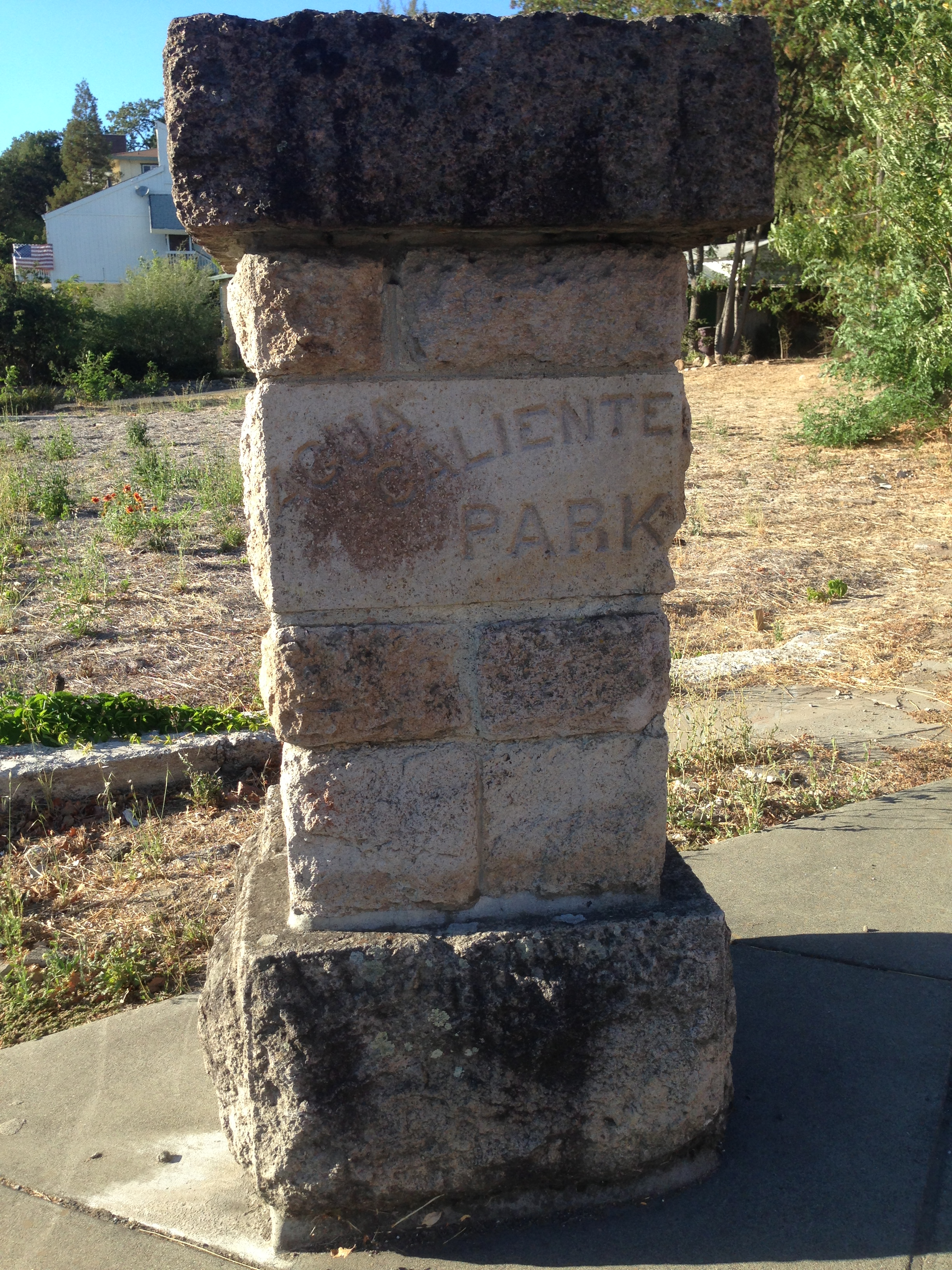
Agua Caliente Park

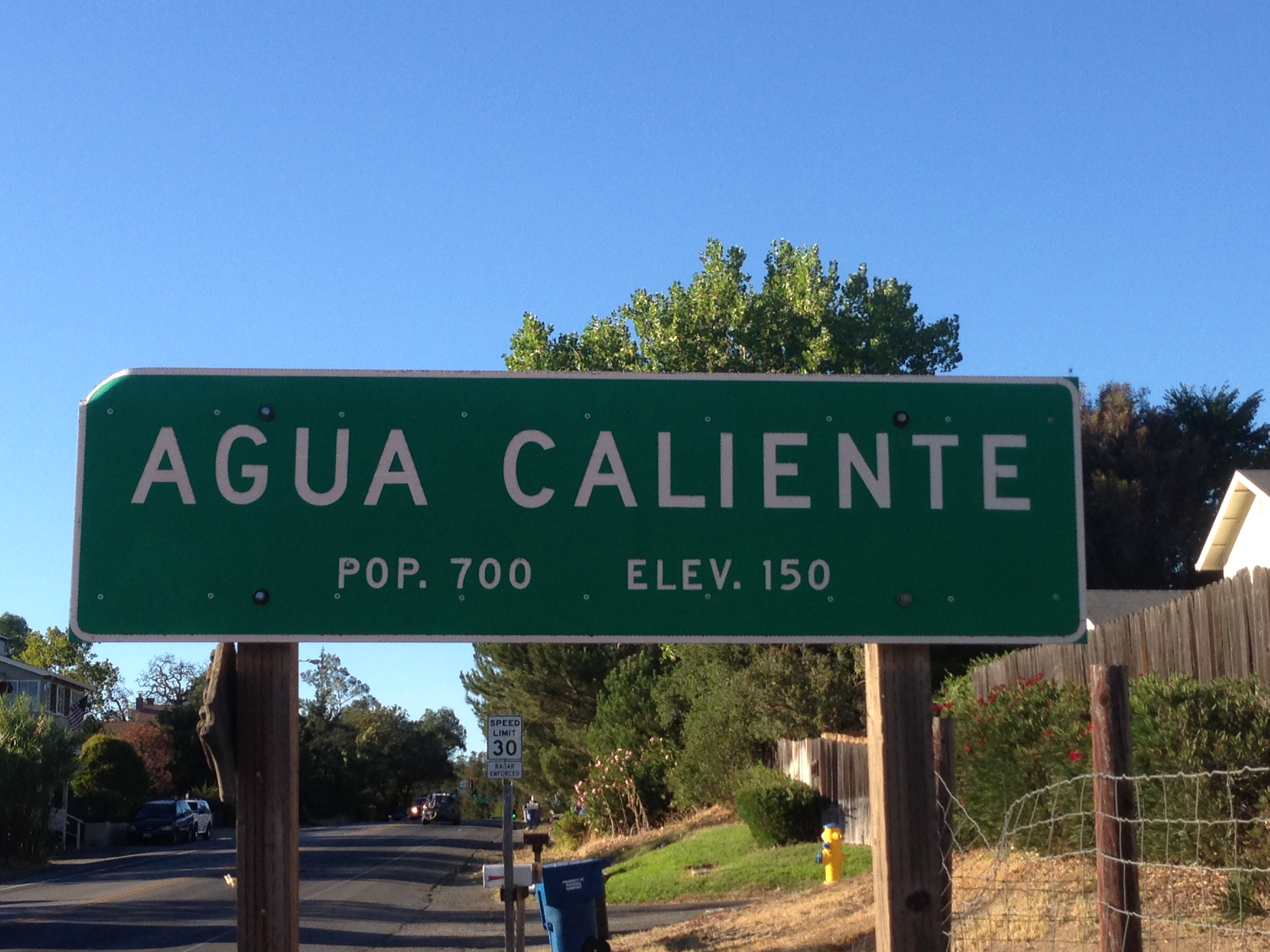
Agua Caliente

Flooding in Aqua Caliente during the October 2021 California storm

== Demographics ==
Historical population
| Census | Pop. | Note | %± |
|---|---|---|---|
| 1980 | 1,675 | | — |
| 1990 | 2,024 | | 20.8% |
| 2000 | 2,505 | | 23.8% |
| 2010 | 4,144 | | 65.4% |
| 2020 | 4,233 | | 2.1% |
U.S. Decennial Census; 1860–1870 1880-1890; 1900 1910 1920; 1930 1940 1950; 1960 1970 1980; 1990 2000 2010; 2020

Fetters Hot Springs-Agua Caliente first appeared as a census designated place in the 1980 U.S. census.

=== Racial and ethnic composition ===
Fetters Hot Springs-Agua Caliente CDP, California – Racial and ethnic composition Note: the US Census treats Hispanic/Latino as an ethnic category. This table excludes Latinos from the racial categories and assigns them to a separate category. Hispanics/Latinos may be of any race.
| Race / Ethnicity (NH = Non-Hispanic) | Pop 2000 | Pop 2010 | Pop 2020 | % 2000 | % 2010 | % 2020 |
|---|---|---|---|---|---|---|
| White alone (NH) | 1,591 | 2,065 | 1,743 | 63.51% | 49.83% | 41.18% |
| Black or African American alone (NH) | 22 | 13 | 44 | 0.88% | 0.31% | 1.04% |
| Native American or Alaska Native alone (NH) | 21 | 7 | 12 | 0.84% | 0.17% | 0.28% |
| Asian alone (NH) | 30 | 57 | 77 | 1.20% | 1.38% | 1.82% |
| Native Hawaiian or Pacific Islander alone (NH) | 4 | 8 | 7 | 0.16% | 0.19% | 0.17% |
| Other race alone (NH) | 7 | 8 | 4 | 0.28% | 0.19% | 0.09% |
| Mixed race or Multiracial (NH) | 81 | 61 | 143 | 3.23% | 1.47% | 3.38% |
| Hispanic or Latino (any race) | 749 | 1,925 | 2,203 | 29.90% | 46.45% | 52.04% |
| Total | 2,505 | 4,144 | 4,233 | 100.00% | 100.00% | 100.00% |

=== 2020 census ===
As of the 2020 census, Fetters Hot Springs-Agua Caliente had a population of 4,233. The population density was 2,897.3 inhabitants per square mile (1,118.7/km^{2}). The median age was 38.6 years; 24.2% of residents were under the age of 18 and 16.1% were 65 years of age or older. For every 100 females, there were 92.5 males, and for every 100 females age 18 and over there were 92.6 males age 18 and over.

The census reported that 99.9% of the population lived in households, 6 people (0.1%) lived in non-institutionalized group quarters, and no one was institutionalized. Additionally, 100.0% of residents lived in urban areas and 0.0% lived in rural areas.

There were 1,534 households, of which 34.8% had children under the age of 18 living in them. Of all households, 49.5% were married-couple households, 27.1% had a female householder with no spouse or partner present, and 16.4% had a male householder with no spouse or partner present. About 26.1% of households were made up of individuals, and 12.6% had someone living alone who was 65 years of age or older. The average household size was 2.76. There were 1,027 families (66.9% of all households).

There were 1,671 housing units at an average density of 1,143.7 units per square mile (441.6 units/km^{2}). Of all housing units, 8.2% were vacant; the homeowner vacancy rate was 2.1% and the rental vacancy rate was 2.3%. Of the 1,534 occupied units (91.8% of total units), 55.6% were owner-occupied and 44.4% were occupied by renters.

Racial composition as of the 2020 census
| Race | Number | Percent |
|---|---|---|
| White | 2,055 | 48.5% |
| Black or African American | 46 | 1.1% |
| American Indian and Alaska Native | 63 | 1.5% |
| Asian | 80 | 1.9% |
| Native Hawaiian and Other Pacific Islander | 7 | 0.2% |
| Some other race | 1,297 | 30.6% |
| Two or more races | 685 | 16.2% |

=== Income and poverty ===
In 2023, the US Census Bureau estimated that the median household income was $116,667, and the per capita income was $49,036. About 8.7% of families and 12.0% of the population were below the poverty line.

=== 2010 census ===
At the 2010 census Fetters Hot Springs-Agua Caliente had a population of 4,144. The population density was 2,815.6 inhabitants per square mile (1,087.1/km^{2}). The racial makeup of Fetters Hot Springs-Agua Caliente was 2,926 (70.6%) White, 25 (0.6%) African American, 39 (0.9%) Native American, 68 (1.6%) Asian, 8 (0.2%) Pacific Islander, 895 (21.6%) from other races, and 183 (4.4%) from two or more races. Hispanic or Latino of any race were 1,925 persons (46.5%).

The census reported that 99.6% of the population lived in households and 0.4% lived in non-institutionalized group quarters.

There were 1,419 households, 570 (40.2%) had children under the age of 18 living in them, 709 (50.0%) were opposite-sex married couples living together, 175 (12.3%) had a female householder with no husband present, 86 (6.1%) had a male householder with no wife present. There were 90 (6.3%) unmarried opposite-sex partnerships, and 30 (2.1%) same-sex married couples or partnerships. 327 households (23.0%) were one person and 108 (7.6%) had someone living alone who was 65 or older. The average household size was 2.91. There were 970 families (68.4% of households); the average family size was 3.46.

The age distribution was 1,137 people (27.4%) under the age of 18, 409 people (9.9%) aged 18 to 24, 1,070 people (25.8%) aged 25 to 44, 1,148 people (27.7%) aged 45 to 64, and 380 people (9.2%) who were 65 or older. The median age was 34.8 years. For every 100 females, there were 98.8 males. For every 100 females age 18 and over, there were 97.1 males.

There were 1,585 housing units at an average density of 1,076.9 per square mile (415.8/km^{2}), of which 58.1% were owner-occupied and 41.9% were occupied by renters. The homeowner vacancy rate was 2.4%; the rental vacancy rate was 8.0%. 51.4% of the population lived in owner-occupied housing units and 48.2% lived in rental housing units.

== Government ==
In the state legislature, Fetters Hot Springs-Agua Caliente is in the 3rd senatorial district, represented by Democrat Christopher Cabaldon, and in the 4th Assembly district, represented by Democrat Cecilia Aguiar-Curry.

Federally, Fetters Hot Springs-Agua Caliente is in California's 4th congressional district, represented by Democrat Mike Thompson.

== Education ==
The school district is Sonoma Valley Unified School District.
