= Boyes Hot Springs, California =

Boyes Hot Springs
- Census designated place
- Nickname: Boyes Springs
- Location in Sonoma County and the state of California

- Location in the United States
- Coordinates: 38°18′40″N 122°29′2″W
- Country: United States
- State: California
- County: Sonoma

Area
  - Total: 1.06 sq mi (2.75 km^{2})
  - Land: 1.06 sq mi (2.75 km^{2})
  - Water: 0 sq mi (0.00 km^{2}) 0%
- Elevation: 135 ft (41 m)

Population (2020)
  - Total: 6,215
  - Density: 5,861.1/sq mi (2,262.97/km^{2})
- Time zone: UTC-8 (Pacific)
  - Summer (DST): UTC-7 (PDT)
- ZIP code: 95416 (PO boxes), 95476 (Street addresses)
- Area code: 707
- FIPS code: 06-07848
- GNIS feature ID: 1658122

Boyes Hot Springs (also called Boyes Springs or The Springs) is a census-designated place (CDP) in Sonoma Valley, Sonoma County, California, United States. The population was 6,215 people at the 2020 census. Resorts in Boyes Hot Springs, El Verano, Fetters Hot Springs, and Agua Caliente were popular health retreats for tourists from San Francisco and points beyond until the middle of the 20th century because of the geothermic hot springs that still well up from deep within the Earth.

== History ==
The area was first occupied by Indigenous peoples, who discovered and used the hot springs that the area is named after. Under Mexican rule, in July 1840, Lazaro Piña was deeded 50,000 acres as Rancho Agua Caliente. Sometime in 1849 Thaddeus M. Leavenworth acquired 320 acres of the Rancho in what became present-day Agua Caliente, Fetters Hot Springs, Boyes Hot Springs, and part of Maxwell Farm. In 1889, property was being sold in the area as being near the "celebrated old Indian Medicine Spring." Henry Ernest Boyes discovered hot springs in 1895 in the central part of the area. He and his wife called the area Agua Rica. and started the Boyes Hot Springs Hotel, now the site of the Fairmont Sonoma Mission Inn & Spa. The area became popular with tourists, with over 70,000 visiting each year. A railroad serviced the area during this period.

A wildfire in September 1923 destroyed the settlement.

During the Great Depression, the area's tourism business stopped and the hotel closed. During that period, the Oakland Oaks and San Francisco Seals did their spring training in Boyes Hot Springs. Tourism became the region's main economic focus again later in the 1930s, then during World War II it was taken over by the United States Navy, who sent sailors to the area for recreation. Railroad service stopped in 1942.

Today, the area is primarily residential with a large Latino population. Boyes Hot Springs is part of an area called "The Springs", which also includes Fetters Hot Springs and Agua Caliente.

== Geography ==
According to the United States Census Bureau, the CDP has a total area of 1.1 square miles (2.8 km^{2}), all land. Boyes Hot Springs is known for, and named after, the hot springs that run 1,100 feet below the surface. Today, the springs are accessible through the Fairmont Hotel and Spa located in the area. The springs run at 135 degrees.

== Infrastructure ==
=== Transportation ===
Sonoma County Transit runs bus services through the Boyes Springs area.

== Geography ==
=== Climate ===
This region experiences hot and dry summers, with average summer temperatures between 85 and 110 degrees. According to the Köppen Climate Classification system, Boyes Hot Springs has a warm-summer Mediterranean climate, abbreviated "Csb" on climate maps.

== Demographics ==
Historical population
Census	Pop.	Note	%±
1950	2,391		—
1960	2,462		3.0%
1970	3,558		44.5%
1980	4,177		17.4%
1990	5,973		43.0%
2000	6,665		11.6%
2010	6,656		−0.1%
2020	6,215		−6.6%
U.S. Decennial Census; 1860–1870 1880-1890; 1900 1910 1920; 1930 1940 1950; 1960 1970 1980; 1990 2000 2010; 2020

The community first appeared as an unincorporated place as Boyes Springs-Fetters Springs in the 1950 U.S. census; and as Boyes Springs in the 1960 U.S. census. The name was changed to the present form for the 1970 U.S. census. Boyes was redesignated as a census designated place in the 1980 U.S. census.

=== Racial and ethnic composition ===
Boyes Hot Springs CDP, California – Racial and ethnic composition Note: the US Census treats Hispanic/Latino as an ethnic category. This table excludes Latinos from the racial categories and assigns them to a separate category. Hispanics/Latinos may be of any race.
Race / Ethnicity (NH = Non-Hispanic)	Pop 2000	Pop 2010	Pop 2020	% 2000	% 2010	% 2020
White alone (NH)	3,640	3,133	2,800	54.61%	47.07%	45.05%
Black or African American alone (NH)	22	21	20	0.33%	0.32%	0.32%
Native American or Alaska Native alone (NH)	19	25	27	0.29%	0.38%	0.43%
Asian alone (NH)	61	73	137	0.92%	1.10%	2.20%
Native Hawaiian or Pacific Islander alone (NH)	4	7	16	0.06%	0.11%	0.26%
Other race alone (NH)	13	12	27	0.20%	0.18%	0.43%
Mixed race or Multiracial (NH)	129	115	227	1.94%	1.73%	3.65%
Hispanic or Latino (any race)	2,777	3,270	2,961	41.67%	49.13%	47.64%
Total	6,665	6,656	6,215	100.00%	100.00%	100.00%

=== 2020 census ===
As of the 2020 census, Boyes Hot Springs had a population of 6,215 and a population density of 5,863.2 inhabitants per square mile (2,263.8/km^{2}). The median age was 39.8 years. 22.3% of residents were under the age of 18, 8.0% were aged 18 to 24, 26.8% were aged 25 to 44, 26.1% were aged 45 to 64, and 16.9% were 65 years of age or older. For every 100 females, there were 100.1 males, and for every 100 females age 18 and over, there were 97.6 males age 18 and over.

The census reported that 99.9% of the population lived in households, 0.1% lived in non-institutionalized group quarters, and no one was institutionalized. 100.0% of residents lived in urban areas, while 0.0% lived in rural areas.

There were 2,306 households, of which 32.0% had children under the age of 18. Of all households, 45.5% were married-couple households, 9.1% were cohabiting couple households, 16.9% were households with a male householder and no spouse or partner present, and 28.5% were households with a female householder and no spouse or partner present. About 24.7% of households were made up of individuals, and 11.8% had someone living alone who was 65 years of age or older. The average household size was 2.69, and there were 1,511 families (65.5% of all households).

There were 2,478 housing units at an average density of 2,337.7 units per square mile (902.6 units/km^{2}), of which 2,306 (93.1%) were occupied and 6.9% were vacant. Of occupied units, 53.5% were owner-occupied and 46.5% were occupied by renters. The homeowner vacancy rate was 0.6% and the rental vacancy rate was 2.4%.

Racial composition as of the 2020 census
Race	Number	Percent
White	3,100	49.9%
Black or African American	20	0.3%
American Indian and Alaska Native	112	1.8%
Asian	148	2.4%
Native Hawaiian and Other Pacific Islander	18	0.3%
Some other race	1,449	23.3%
Two or more races	1,368	22.0%

=== Income and poverty ===
In 2023, the US Census Bureau estimated that the median household income was $89,568, and the per capita income was $43,990. About 10.0% of families and 10.1% of the population were below the poverty line.

=== 2010 census ===
The 2010 United States census reported that Boyes Hot Springs had a population of 6,656. The population density was 6,286.3 inhabitants per square mile (2,427.2/km^{2}). The racial makeup of Boyes Hot Springs was 4,505 (39.1%) White, 48 (0.7%) African American, 91 (1.4%) Native American, 84 (1.3%) Asian, 9 (0.1%) Pacific Islander, 1,674 (25.2%) from other races, and 245 (3.7%) from two or more races. Hispanic or Latino of any race were 6784 persons (67.7%)

The Census reported that 99.9% of the population lived in households and 0.1% lived in non-institutionalized group quarters.

There were 2,322 households, out of which 888 (38.2%) had children under the age of 18 living in them, 1,082 (46.6%) were opposite-sex married couples living together, 267 (11.5%) had a female householder with no husband present, 162 (7.0%) had a male householder with no wife present. There were 190 (8.2%) unmarried opposite-sex partnerships, and 28 (1.2%) same-sex married couples or partnerships. 598 households (25.8%) were made up of individuals, and 195 (8.4%) had someone living alone who was 65 years of age or older. The average household size was 2.86. There were 1,511 families (65.1% of all households); the average family size was 3.46.

The population was spread out, with 1,763 people (26.5%) under the age of 18, 654 people (9.8%) aged 18 to 24, 1,957 people (29.4%) aged 25 to 44, 1,664 people (25.0%) aged 45 to 64, and 618 people (9.3%) who were 65 years of age or older. The median age was 34.0 years. For every 100 females, there were 103.3 males. For every 100 females age 18 and over, there were 104.0 males.

There were 2,508 housing units at an average density of 2,368.7 per square mile (914.6/km^{2}), of which 53.7% were owner-occupied and 46.3% were occupied by renters. The homeowner vacancy rate was 1.6%; the rental vacancy rate was 3.6%. 46.6% of the population lived in owner-occupied housing units and 53.3% lived in rental housing units.

== Economy ==
Historically, tourism has been a major economic factor for the area, focusing around the attraction of the naturally occurring hot springs. The springs were not only used for bathing, but, also for bottling. Electricity ran bottling plants, which bottled carbonated and still water for consumption.

Boyes Hot Springs is the site of the third Fairmont Hotel and Resorts property in Northern California, the Fairmont Sonoma Mission Inn & Spa. The high end hotel is located on a historic hotel site that served as a popular getaway for tourists in the 1920s who used the hot springs located in the area. The spa on-site uses the hot springs that the area is named after. Boyes Hot Springs is also known for having one of the first Michelin Guide star rated restaurants in the area, Sante, which is located in the Fairmont.

== Government ==
In the California State Legislature, Boyes Hot Springs is in the 3rd senatorial district, represented by Democrat Christopher Cabaldon, and in the 4th Assembly district, represented by Democrat Cecilia Aguiar-Curry.

In the United States House of Representatives, Boyes Hot Springs is in California's 4th congressional district, represented by Democrat Mike Thompson.

== Education ==
The school district is Sonoma Valley Unified School District.

== Notable people ==
- Shotsie Gorman, tattoo artist, painter, sculptor and poet
- Duffy Lewis, major league outfielder, chiefly with the Boston Red Sox
