= List of Chicano and Mexican monuments and memorials in California =

This is a list of Chicano/Mexican-American and Mexican monuments and memorials located in California. This list may include memorials but does not include plaques or historical markers.

== List ==
Name	Image	Subject	Location	Artist	Date	Notes
Woman of Tehuantepec		Depiction of a Zapotec women from Tehuantepec, Oaxaca.	Balboa Park, San Diego	Donal Hord	1935	The sculpture was created for the 1935 California Pacific International Exposition.
Statue of Miguel Hidalgo y Costilla		Miguel Hidalgo y Costilla, leader of the Mexican War of Independence	El Parque de México, Lincoln Park, Los Angeles	Efrén de los Ríos	1938	Moved to current location in 1982.
Cinco Puntos Memorial		Originally only honored Chicano/Mexican-American veterans that served during World War II, but later expanded to honor all wars.	Boyle Heights, Los Angeles		1947	The memorial is known as the starting point of the 1968 Chicano Moratorium protests.
Campo de Cahuenga		Dedicated to the 1847 Treaty of Cahuenga, which ended the Conquest of California (part of the Mexican-American War).	San Fernando Valley, Los Angeles		1951	Built by the San Fernando Valley Historical Society on the site where the treaty was signed.
El Soldado Memorial		Originally only honored Chicano/Mexican-American veterans from the Sacramento Valley that served during World War II, but later expanded to honor all Chicano/Mexican-American veterans from all of California that served in all wars.	Capitol Mall, Sacramento		1951	Moved to current location across from the California Capitol in 1975.
Statue of Miguel Hidalgo y Costilla		Miguel Hidalgo y Costilla, leader of the Mexican War of Independence	Dolores Park, San Francisco	Juan F. Olaguibel	1962	
Bust of Lázaro Cárdenas		Lázaro Cárdenas, former President of Mexico.	El Parque de México, Lincoln Park, Los Angeles	Ernesto Tamariz	1970	Moved to current location in 1989.
Vaquero Monument		Equestrian statue of a Californio vaquero, erected in honor of the 200th anniversary of the founding of Presidio of San Diego.	Presidio Park, San Diego		1970	Gift of Mexican President Gustavo Díaz Ordaz to the people of San Diego.
Bust of General Mariano G. Vallejo		Mariano Guadalupe Vallejo, Californio statesman, general, and ranchero.	Vallejo City Hall, Vallejo	Rosa Estebañez	1973	
Bust of Francisca Benicia Carrillo de Vallejo		Francisca Benicia Carrillo de Vallejo, Californio ranchera and entrepreneur.	Vallejo City Hall, Vallejo	Rosa Estebañez	1973	
Bust of General Mariano G. Vallejo		Mariano Guadalupe Vallejo, Californio statesman, general, and ranchero.	Rancho Petaluma Adobe State Historic Park, Petaluma	Rosa Estebañez	1975	
Statue of Benito Juárez		Benito Juárez, former President of Mexico.	El Parque de México, Lincoln Park, Los Angeles		1976	
Bust of Soledad Ortega de Argüello		María Soledad Ortega de Argüello, Californio ranchera.	Argüello Plaza, Redwood City	Ray Lorenzato	1976	
Bell of Dolores		Dedicated in honor of Miguel Hidalgo y Costilla's Cry of Dolores.	El Parque de México, Lincoln Park, Los Angeles		1978	
Bust of Benito Juárez		Benito Juárez, former President of Mexico.	Royer Park, Roseville	Ernesto Tamariz	1980	
Atlante de Tula Sculpture		Recreation of the ancient Toltec Atlantean figures from Tula.	Courthouse Park, Fresno		1980	Gift of the state of Hidalgo to the people of Fresno.
Equestrian statue of Emiliano Zapata		Emiliano Zapata, hero of the Mexican Revolution.	El Parque de México, Lincoln Park, Los Angeles	Ignacio Asúnsolo	1980	Gift of Mexico City to the City of Los Angeles.
Statue of Emperor Cuauhtémoc		Cuauhtémoc, last ruler of the Aztec Empire.	El Parque de México, Lincoln Park, Los Angeles	Francisco Jiménez and Miguel Noreña	1981	Copy of the bronze monument to Cuauhtémoc in Mexico City.
Statue of Benito Juárez		Benito Juárez, former President of Mexico.	Pantoja Park, San Diego	Ernesto Tamariz	1981	Gift of the people of Mexico to the people of San Diego.
Equestrian statue of José María Morelos		José María Morelos, former President of Mexico.	El Parque de México, Lincoln Park, Los Angeles	Julián Martínez Soto	1981	Gift of the Mexican President José López Portillo to the people of Los Angeles.
Bust of General Ignacio Zaragoza		Ignacio Zaragoza, general of the Second Franco-Mexican War and hero of the Battle of Puebla.	El Parque de México, Lincoln Park, Los Angeles	Francisco Zúñiga	1981	Gift of Mexican Secretary of Defense Félix Galván López to the people of Los Angeles.
Bust of Miguel Hidalgo y Costilla		Miguel Hidalgo y Costilla, leader of the Mexican War of Independence.	Southside Park, Sacramento		1982	Gift of Mexico City to the City of Sacramento.
Bust of Emiliano Zapata		Emiliano Zapata, leader of the Mexican Revolution.	Zapata Park, Sacramento		1982	
Statue of Agustín Lara		Agustín Lara, famed composer and musician.	El Parque de México, Lincoln Park, Los Angeles	Humberto Peraza	1984	
Bust of Ignacio E. Lozano		Ignacio E. Lozano Sr., publisher and founder of La Opinión.	El Parque de México, Lincoln Park, Los Angeles	María A. Jiménez-Tierney		
Bust of Arcadia Bandini de Baker		Arcadia Bandini de Stearns Baker, co-founder and "Godmother of Santa Monica".	Palisades Park, Santa Monica	Masahito Sanae	1987	
Bust of Jesús González Ortega		Jesús González Ortega, former Governor of Zacatecas and hero of the Reform War and the Second Franco-Mexican War.	El Parque de México, Lincoln Park, Los Angeles	Ayda	1987	
Bill Soberanes Memorial		Bill Soberanes, founder of the World’s Wristwrestling Championship	Petaluma	Rosa Estebañez	1988	
Bust of Ramón López Velarde		Ramón López Velarde, writer and national poet of Mexico.	El Parque de México, Lincoln Park, Los Angeles	Francisco Zúñiga	1988	
Fiesta Jarabe		Jarabe Tapatío dancers.	Otay Mesa Port of Entry, San Diego	Luis Jiménez	1991	
Bust of Josefa Ortiz de Domínguez		Josefa Ortiz de Domínguez, heroine of the Mexican War of Independence.	El Parque de México, Lincoln Park, Los Angeles	Velarco	1994	Moved to current location in 1996.
Statue of César Chávez		César Chávez, civil rights leader.	California State University, Fresno, Fresno		1996	
Statue of César Chávez		César Chávez, civil rights leader.	California State University, San Marcos, San Marcos		1997	
Hispanic American Veterans Memorial		Honoring Hispanic Medal of Honor recipients, as well as all Hispanic American veterans.	Veterans Park, Bell Gardens	Alfredo Osorio	2001	
César Chávez Memorial		César Chávez, civil rights leader.	César Chávez Plaza, Sacramento	Lisa Reinertson	2001	
Statue of Benito Juárez		Benito Juárez, former President of Mexico.	Courthouse Park, Fresno		2003	Gift of the Governor of Oaxaca, José Murat Casab, to the people of Fresno.
El Rey		Olmec colossal head.	City College, San Francisco		2004	Gift of the Governor of Veracruz, Miguel Alemán Velasco, in collaboration with Fine Arts Museums of San Francisco.
Statue of Emiliano Zapata		Emiliano Zapata, leader of the Mexican Revolution.	Chicano Park, San Diego	Arturo Ruano Singh	2004	
Statue of Coatlicue		Recreation of the ancient Aztec Coatlicue statue.	King & Story, San Jose	Einar and Jamex de la Torre	2005	
Tula Sentries Sculptures		Recreation of the ancient Toltec Atlantean figures from Tula.	King & Story, San Jose	Einar and Jamex de la Torre	2005	
Statue of Andrés Avelino Duarte		Andrés Avelino Duarte, founder and namesake of Duarte, California	Plaza Duarte, Duarte	Richard Myer.	2007	Erected by the Duarte Historical Society and the City of Duarte.
Arch of Dignity, Equality, and Justice		César Chávez, Dolores Huerta, and the United Farm Workers movement.	Paseo de César Chávez, San Jose	Judy Baca	2008	
Statue of Lucha Reyes		Lucha Reyes, famed singer known as the "Queen of Ranchera".	Mariachi Plaza, Los Angeles		2009	
Journey to Market		Honoring the Californio laborers in the local dairy industry.	Pacific Electric Depot, Bellflower	Dee Clements	2010	
Equestrian statue of Antonio Aguilar		Antonio Aguilar, famed singer and actor, known as "El Charro de México".	Placita de Dolores, Los Angeles	Dan Medina	2012	
César E. Chávez National Monument		César Chávez, civil rights leader.	Nuestra Señora Reina de la Paz, Keene		2012	Established by President Barack Obama on October 8, 2012, by proclamation under authority of the Antiquities Act.
César Chávez Memorial		César Chávez, civil rights leader.	Rancho de Oro Park, Coachella		2012	
César Chávez Memorial		César Chávez, civil rights leader.	Main Street Pedestrian Mall, Riverside	Ignacio Gómez	2013	
Statue of Lalo Guerrero		Lalo Guerrero, famed Chicano musician	Avenida Lalo Guerrero, Cathedral City	Ignacio Gómez	2016	
Statue of General Mariano G. Vallejo		Mariano Guadalupe Vallejo, Californio statesman, general, and ranchero.	Sonoma Plaza, Sonoma	Jim Callahan	2017	Erected in honor of the 182nd anniversary of the founding of the Pueblo de Sonoma.
Statue of Miguel Hidalgo y Costilla		Miguel Hidalgo y Costilla, leader of the Mexican War of Independence.	Mile Square Park, Fountain Valley		2017	
Statue of Salvio Pacheco		Salvio Pacheco, Californio politician and founder of Concord.	Plaza de Todos Santos, Concord	Paula Slater	2018	Erected in honor of the 150th anniversary of the founding of Concord.
Bracero Monument		Bracero Program.	César Chávez Avenue, Los Angeles	Dan Medina	2019	
César Chávez Memorial		César Chávez, civil rights leader.	San Fernando		2021	
Statue of Felicitas & Gonzalo Méndez		Felicitas & Gonzalo Méndez, civil rights activists.	Méndez Tribute Monument Park, Westminster	Ignacio Gómez	2022	
Equestrian statue of Vicente Fernández		Vicente Fernández, famed singer and charro.	Plaza La Alameda, Walnut Park	Sergio Garval	2023	
César Chávez Memorial		César Chávez, civil rights leader.	César Chávez Library, Perris		2024	
Statue of Cheech Marin		Cheech Marin, famed comedian and actor.	The Cheech Marin Center for Chicano Art & Culture, Riverside		2024	
