= Bust of General Mariano G. Vallejo =

The bust of General Mariano G. Vallejo may refer to:

- Bust of General Mariano G. Vallejo (Petaluma), California, United States
- Bust of General Mariano G. Vallejo (Vallejo), California, United States
