= Fred Wiseman =

Fred Wiseman may refer to:

- Frederick Wiseman (1930–2026), American filmmaker, documentarian, and actor
- Fred J. Wiseman (1875–1961), American aviation pioneer
