= Rosa Estebañez =

Cuban-born American sculptor (1927–1991)

- Born: Rosa Livia Estebañez–Martinez; April 28, 1927; Luyanó, Havana, Cuba
- Died: December 17, 1991 (aged 64); San Rafael, California, U.S.
- Other name: Rosa Estebanez
- Children: 1

Rosa Livia Estebañez (April 28, 1927 – December 17, 1991) was a Cuban and American sculptor, known for her large scale memorials and monuments. She lived in Petaluma, California for many years, where she owned an art gallery.

== Life and career ==
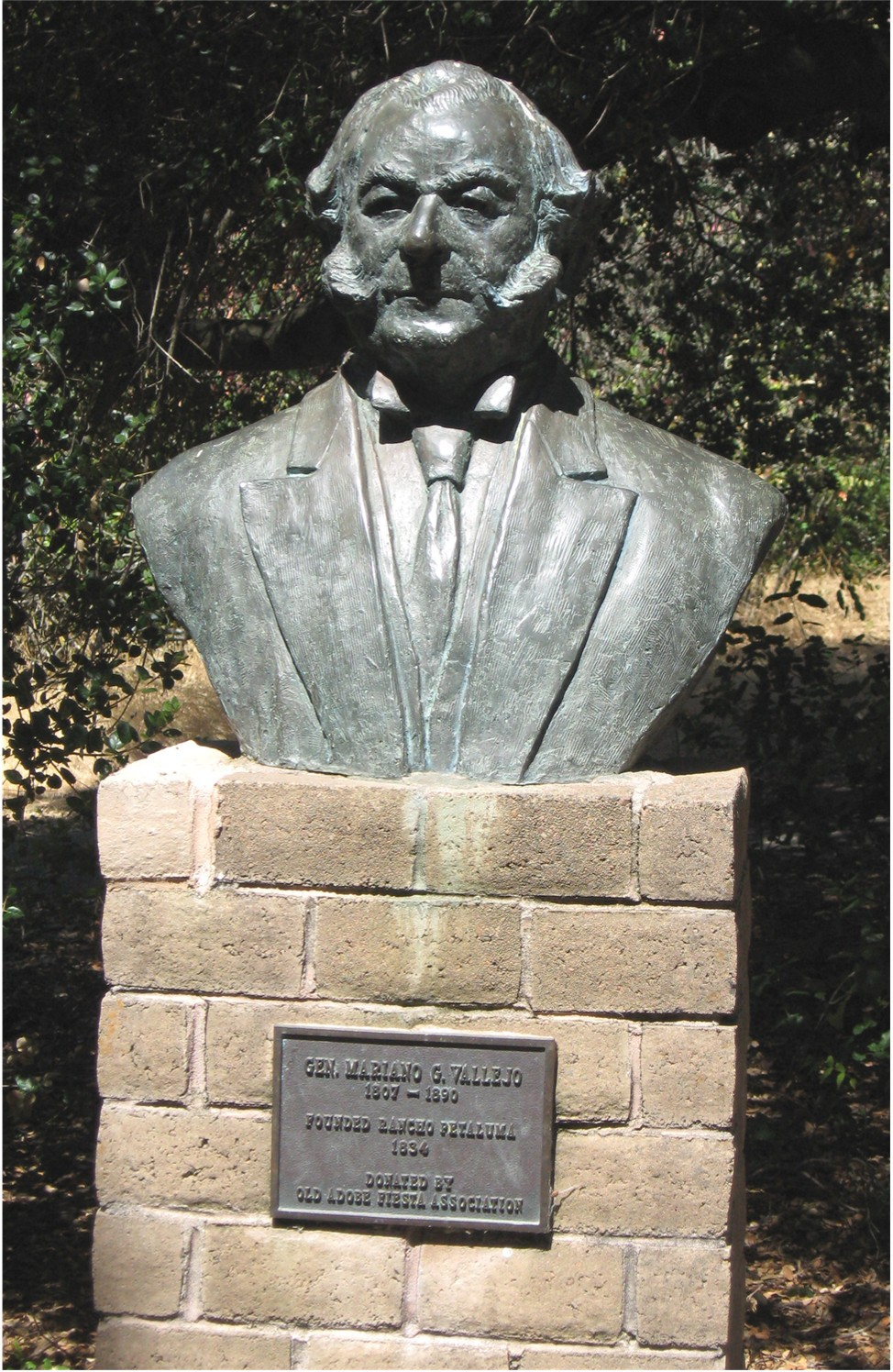
Bust of General Mariano G. Vallejo (1975), by Estebanez in Petaluma, California

Rosa Livia Estebañez–Martinez was born on April 28, 1927, in the Luyanó neighborhood of Havana, Cuba. She graduated with a master's degree in 1951 from the National Art School (Escuelas Nacionales de Arte) in Havana.

She worked as the official sculptor for the Cuban government under President Fulgencio Batista, where she worked on the facades of many government buildings and created public monuments. Estebañez fled to the United States in 1960 with her young son Jorge, during the time when Carlos Manuel Piedra served as the interim President of Cuba right before Fidel Castro took power. They briefly lived in Florida, and settled in Petaluma, California to be near her brother. She was naturalized in the United States in 1964.

By the mid-1960s, Estebañez taught evening sculpture classes in adult education at Petaluma High School. Estebanez hosted a 7-part television series entitled, "How to Sculpt with Rosa" (1977) on KQED Open Studio. Estebañez opened an art gallery in 1978 named La Galeria de Rosa, in Petaluma. In the 1970s and 1980s, Estebañez started getting commissions from churches and local governments to make memorials and historical busts. Some of her notable works include the Fred J. Wiseman monument (1968), Bust of General Mariano G. Vallejo (1975), and the Bust of Bill Sobrates Arm Wresting (1988).

== Death and legacy ==
Her son Jorge Estebanez–Ricoy died in 1979 at age 29, in a car accident. Rosa Estebañez died on December 16, 1991, in a hospital in San Rafael, California.

Estebañez's archives are at the Sonoma County Library. Her artwork is included in the collection at the Smithsonian American Art Museum in Washington, D.C.

== List of works ==
- Fred J. Wiseman Monument (1968), Wiseman Park, Petaluma, California
- Vietnam Veterans Memorial Plaque (1969), Walnut Park, Petaluma, California
- Madonna and Child, St. Sebastian Catholic Church, Sebastopol, California
- Bust of Chief Solano (1973), Vallejo City Hall, Vallejo, California
- Bust of Francisca Benicia Carrillo de Vallejo (1973), Vallejo City Hall, Petaluma, California
- Bust of General Mariano G. Vallejo (1973), Vallejo City Hall, Vallejo, California
- Bust of General Mariano G. Vallejo (1975), Petaluma Adobe State Historic Park, Petaluma, California
- The World's Ugliest Dog Statue (1977)
- Jesus as a Young Child (1980), St. James Catholic Church, Petaluma, California
- Great Seal of the State of California (1986), 18 feet (5.5 m) tall sculpture, California State Government Office, 505 Van Ness Street, San Francisco, California
- Helen Putnam Memorial (1987), Putnam Plaza at Helen Putnam Regional Park, Petaluma, California
- Bust of Bill Sobrates Arm Wresting (1988), corner of East Washington and Petaluma Boulevard, Petaluma, California
- Jesus with Saints (1988), Holy Cross Cemetery, Colma, California
- St. Rose of Lima (1989), Holy Cross Cemetery, Colma, California
- St. Francis, St. Francis Winery and Vineyard, Santa Rosa, California
