= Francisca Benicia Carrillo de Vallejo =

Californio pioneer (1815–1891)

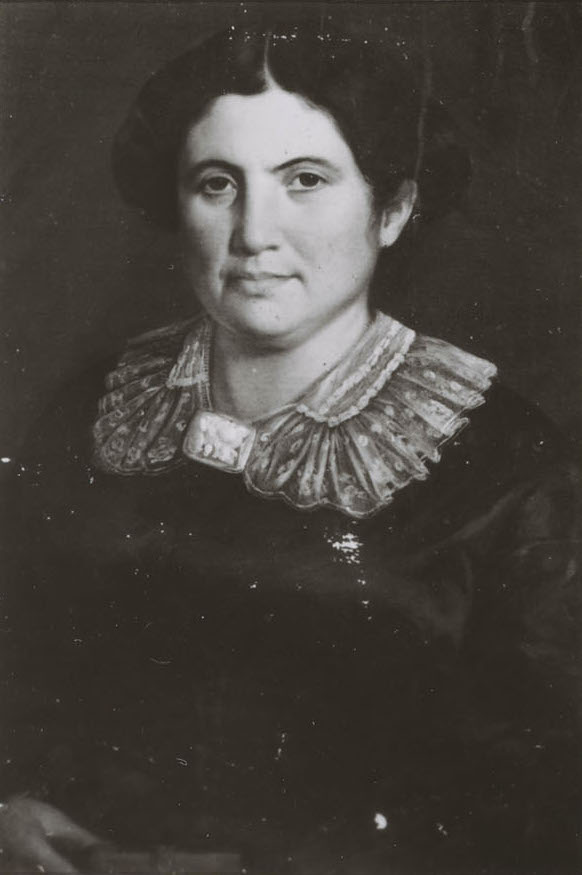
- Portrait of Francisca Benicia Carrillo de Vallejo by Stephen Shaw, 1856
- Born: Francisca Benicia Carrillo; August 23, 1815; San Diego, Alta California, New Spain
- Died: January 30, 1891 (aged 75); Sonoma, California, U.S.
- Resting place: Mountain Cemetery, Sonoma, California, U.S.
- Citizenship: Spain; Mexico; United States
- Known for: Namesake of Benicia, California
- Spouse: Mariano Guadalupe Vallejo (m. 1832; died 1890)
- Children: 16
- Parents: Joaquin Victor Carrillo (father); María Ygnacia López (mother)
- Relatives: José Antonio Romualdo Pacheco, Jr. (nephew)

Doña Francisca Benicia Carrillo de Vallejo (1815-1891) was a Californio pioneer. A member of the Carrillo family of California, Carrillo was the wife of Mariano Guadalupe Vallejo. Carrillo was an early settler of Sonoma, California, the town founded by her husband. She survived the Bear Flag Rebellion and went on to oversee the Vallejo estate, Lachryma Montis, until her death in 1891. The city of Benicia, California is named after her.

== Early life ==
Francisca Benicia Carrillo was born on August 23, 1815, in San Diego in Alta California to María Ygnacia López de Carrillo and Joaquin Victor Carrillo.

On January 24, 1830, Francisca Carrillo met a young soldier named Mariano Guadalupe Vallejo who arrived in San Diego in the wake of the Solis revolt. She was 15 and he was 23 years old. Vallejo courted Carrillo over the course of two weeks before leaving for Monterey. It would be over two years Carrillo would see Vallejo in person. The two kept in touch with letters. On October 15, Mariano sent a letter to Anastasio Bustamante, the President of Mexico, asking permission to marry Carrillo. In the letter, Vallejo confirmed that their parents gave permission for the couple to be married. It took two years for Bustamante to approve the couple's request. On March 6, 1832, Carrillo and Vallejo were married at the Presidio of San Diego. José María de Echeandía attended the wedding. Echeandía gave a toast at the reception, during which he said of Carrillo: "I have known his young wife since she was eight years old, and I have had repeated occasions to admire her fine manners."

== Matriarch of the Vallejo family ==
=== Time in San Francisco ===
By February 1833, Vallejo was named Commander of the Presidio of San Francisco. During this time, Carrillo, pregnant with the couple's first child, journeyed 800 miles from San Diego to San Francisco to reside with Vallejo in the Presidio headquarters. She was accompanied by Vallejo's brother, Salvador Vallejo, and an escort of 20 soldiers. The trip took four weeks. Salvador would go on to marry Carrillo's sister, Maria de la Luz Carillo.

Andronico Vallejo was born on March 4, 1833. He died in September and was buried at Mission San Francisco de Asis. The couple would have a second child on April 28, 1834, also named Andronico. On May 1, 1834, Governor José Figueroa assigned Vallejo the task of establishing a fort in the area, north of San Francisco, that would eventually become Sonoma County. Vallejo went to Mission San Francisco Solano to create the fort, founding Sonoma, California. Carrillo remained in San Francisco, with her son, until the summer of 1835, when they moved to Sonoma.

=== Life in Sonoma ===
==== Early life in Sonoma ====
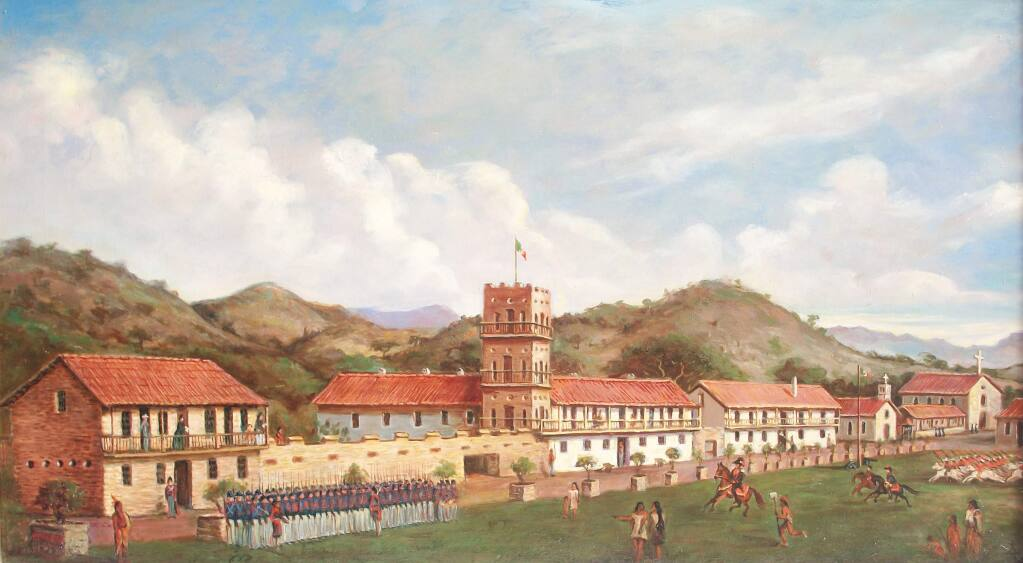
A depiction of Sonoma as it was when Carrillo arrived, in 1846. Casa Grande is the building with the tower in the center.

Carrillo had a third child with Vallejo shortly after arriving in Sonoma: a girl named Epifania Gertrudis, born on August 4, 1835. Carrillo would have a total of 16 children with Vallejo - 6 of whom died at birth or in childhood. The family lived in Casa Grande, a three-story home on the new Sonoma Plaza. The household was maintained by over twenty Native American servants, including one serving each of the children and two serving Carrillo. The Vallejo's also maintained a second home in neighboring Petaluma, the Rancho Petaluma Adobe.

==== Bear Flag Rebellion ====
Carrillo was at Casa Grande when the Bear Flag Rebellion happened in 1846, resulting in the capture of Sonoma by American immigrants for 25 days and the imprisonment of Jacob P. Leese and Vallejo. The rebels, nicknamed "Bears", placed the Bear Flag on the Sonoma Plaza, taking over the fledgling town.

During the rebellion, Carrillo's brother, Ramón, was accused of joining Juan Nepomuceno Padilla in killing two Bears, Thomas Cowie and George Fowler. Padilla and Ramón went to nearby Rancho Olompali to hide. Carrillo smuggled weapons to Ramón, Padilla, and her mother (who lived just north of Sonoma as owner of the rancho of Santa Rosa, California). The weapons included pistols, gun powder, flintlocks and sabers. They were delivered by an Indian servant named Gervasio. Ramón denied having anything to do with the death of the Americans and gave a sworn affidavit saying Padilla directed the killing of the men.

The U.S. Navy removed the Bear Flag on July 9, raising the twenty-seven star flag of the United States in its place. Carrillo celebrated the raising of the American flag, writing a letter to Vallejo, who remained imprisoned at Sutter's Fort. In the letter, she wrote that there were "great celebrations" and that she was "cheering heartily" and waving handkerchiefs. Carrillo celebrated at Casa Grande, hosting American servicemen. She also maintained a watchful eye over the new American flag, to ensure it remained in place. A soldier, who visited Casa Grande to celebrate, called Carrillo "very fat" and "having evidence of much beauty. She seems to be femininely passive and voluptuous, contented and happy."

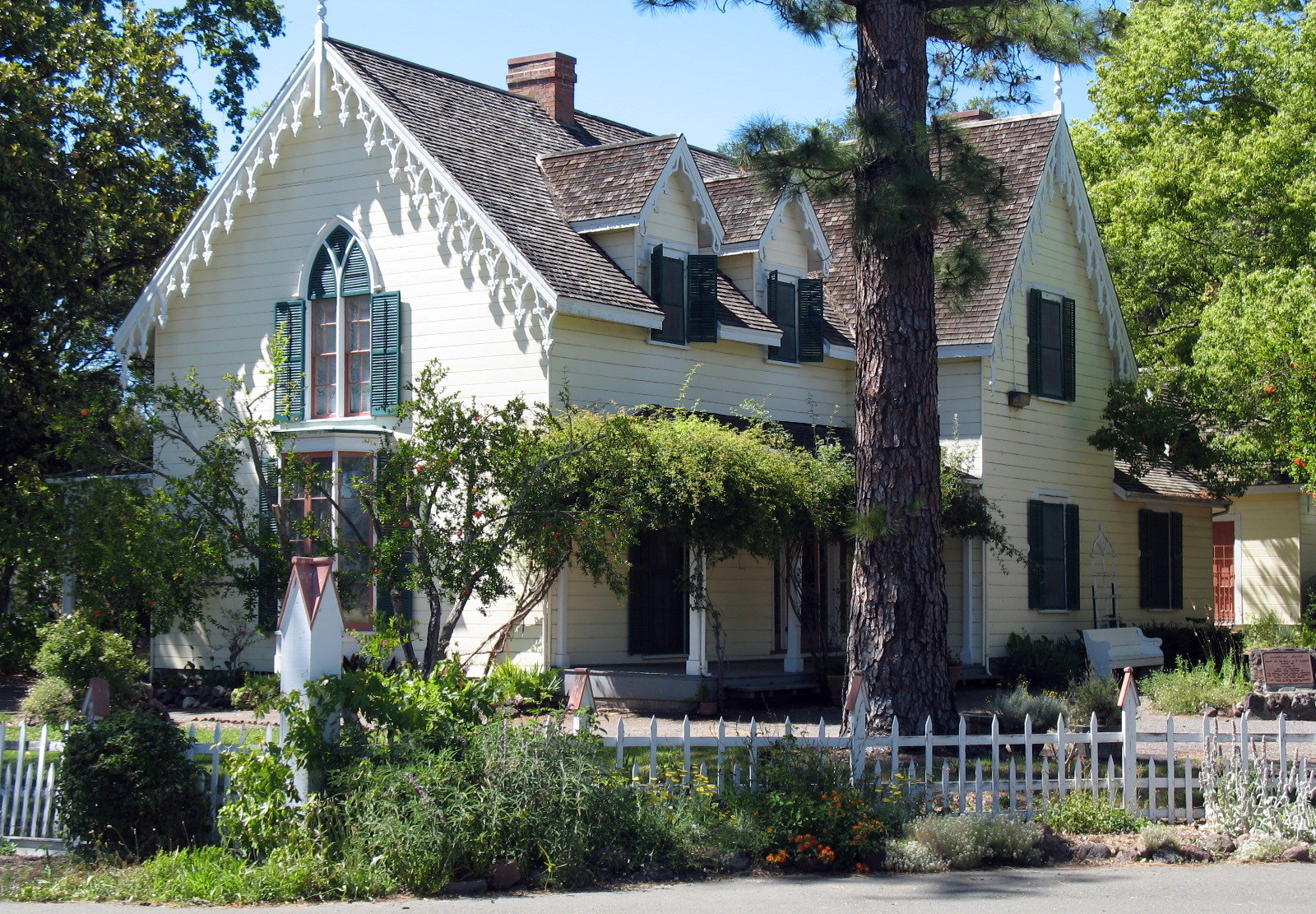
Lachryma Montis in Sonoma, Carrillo & Vallejo's home that was completed in 1852.

In Sonoma, Carrillo's closest friend was Rosalía Leese, the sister of Vallejo and wife of Jacob Leese. Despite the removal of the Bear Flag and the end of the rebellion, Bear Flag rebels remained in Sonoma. Both Carrillo and Leese resented the fact that certain Bears, including William Ide and Robert B. Semple, continued to spend time in Sonoma so soon after the Navy quelled the takeover. In her letter to Vallejo, Carrillo calls the Bears "disconsolate." She lamented that if the United States Navy would have arrived sooner - in mid-June - the unnecessary deaths of numerous people, including Cowie and Fowler, would have never happened.

==== After the Revolt ====
In May 1847, Vallejo gave Semple and Thomas O. Larkin a five square mile land tract, which would become Benicia, California. Vallejo wanted to name the new city "Francisca." However, after Yerba Buena changed its name to San Francisco, they named the city "Benicia" to avoid confusion. After the naming, Carrillo was called Doña Benicia by Benicia residents.

The Vallejo's built Lachryma Montis in 1850, blocks from the Sonoma Plaza. The home would serve as the couple's final home until their deaths. It was at Lachryma Montis where Carrillo threw grand parties, including entertaining David Glasgow Farragut, William T. Sherman, Ulysses S. Grant and Edwin Bryant.

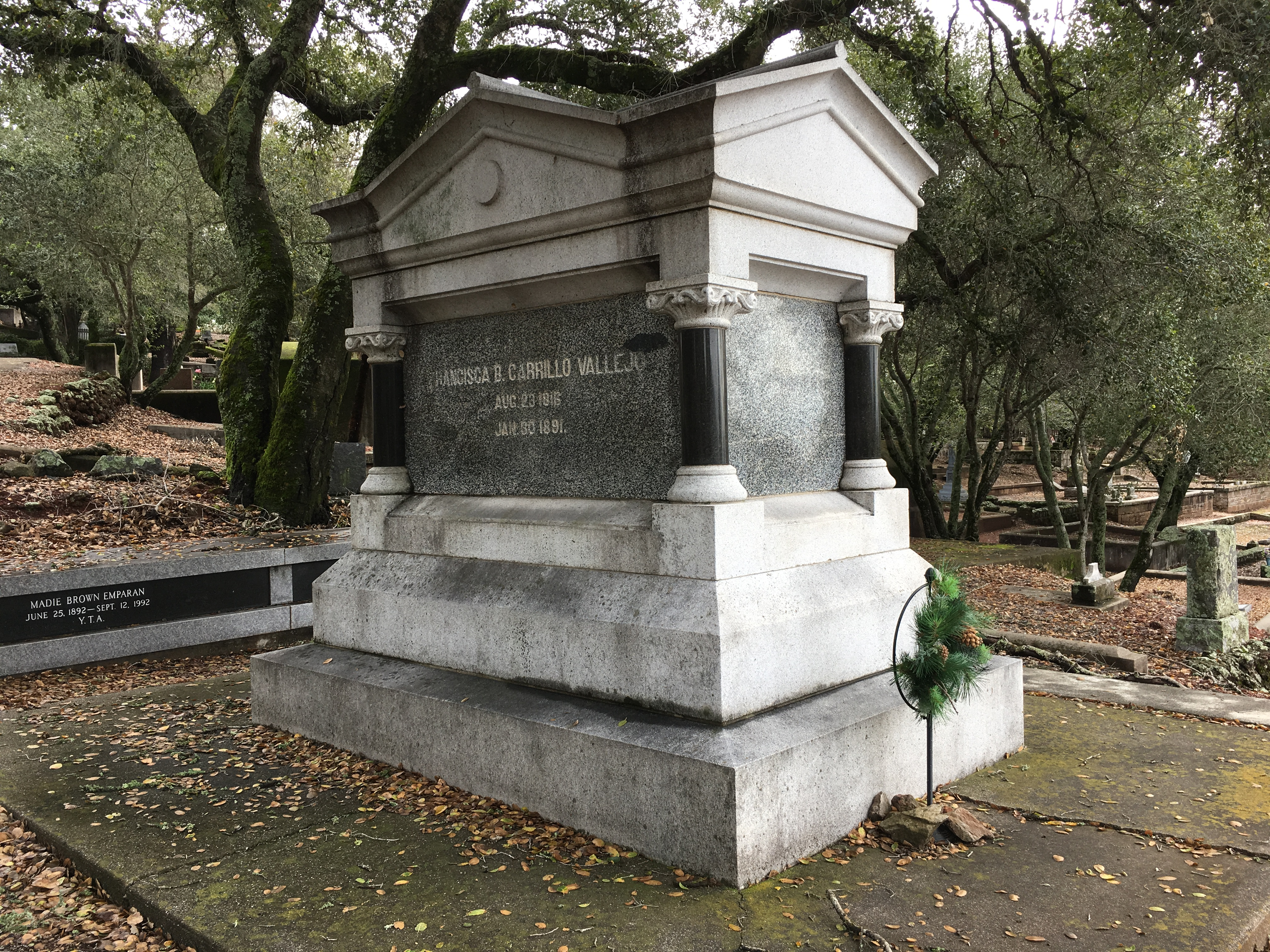
Grave of Francisca Benicia Carrillo and Mariano Guadalupe Vallejo in Mountain Cemetery in Sonoma, California.

As the Vallejo's wealth diminished, in the 1860s they began growing and selling figs, apples and grapes, and raising chickens for eggs. Carrillo oversaw the distribution of produce and eggs to San Francisco and throughout Sonoma, selling at bakeries, restaurants and hotels. Carrillo, who used to have a large household of servants, also oversaw Lachryma Montis with little help. She managed the cleaning, gardening and other necessities, with two cooks operating the kitchen.

Carrillo and Vallejo's relationship was strained during this time due to finances and Vallejo's extended time away from Sonoma, often spent in Watsonville, California where he was involved with his nephew's rancho, Rancho Bolsa de San Cayetano. When he returned to Sonoma in 1869, his brother, Salvador Vallejo, moved in with the family at Lachryma Montis. This caused additional strain, as Carrillo was not fond of Salvador - he was abusive to and regularly cheated on his wife. Vallejo and Carrillo separated in the fall of 1869. Carrillo moved to Vallejo to live with her daughter Fannie. Vallejo stayed at Lachryma Montis. Carrillo returned to live with Vallejo in late 1870.

== Later life and death ==
Mariano Guadalupe Vallejo died on January 18, 1890. Carrillo died at Lachryma Montis on January 30, 1891. She is buried, alongside Vallejo, at Sonoma's Mountain Cemetery.

== Legacy ==
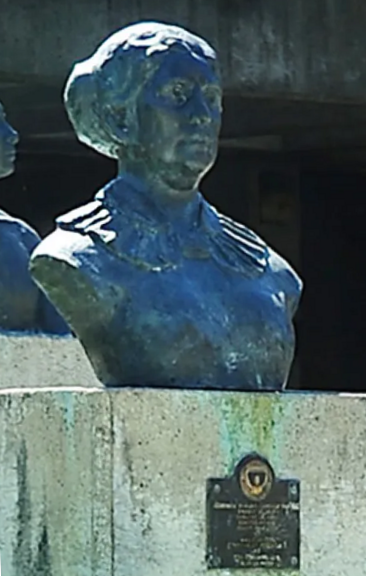
Bust of Francisca Benicia Carrillo de Vallejo at Vallejo City Hall.

Edwin Bryant called Carrillo "a lady of charming personal appearance" who had "the highest degree that natural grace, ease, and warmth of manner." Her sons described her as "level-headed" and a supporter of women's rights. Historian Alan Rosenus described her as "a proud, somewhat conventional woman, conscious of her social standing." Carrillo was very religious and a believer in Catholic dogma. She was also sarcastic and very emotional, often writing blunt, sensitive, and emotive letters to Vallejo when he was not in Sonoma.

Carrillo liked luxury goods. She wore dresses and accessories made with expensive silks and velvet that were imported from France. When her daughter, Adela, was preparing to be married, Carrillo took her to San Francisco for several days. The two women spent $1,700 - over $51,000 in 2020 - shopping and staying at a luxury hotel.

The Bust of Francisca Benicia Carrillo de Vallejo was erected in 1973 at Vallejo City Hall, alongside busts of her husband and Chief Solano.
