= Bust of Francisca Benicia Carrillo de Vallejo =

Statue in Petaluma, California

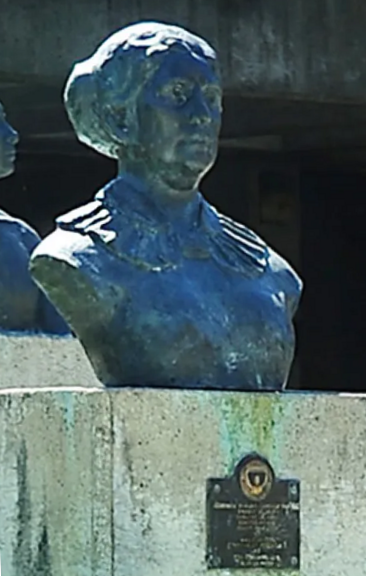
- Artist: Rosa Estebañez
- Year: 1973
- Medium: Bronze
- Subject: Francisca Benicia Carrillo de Vallejo
- Location: Vallejo City Hall, Vallejo, California; 38.102018°N 122.260259°W

The Bust of Francisca Benicia Carrillo de Vallejo is a bronze monument at in Vallejo, California, located at Vallejo City Hall, honoring Francisca Benicia Carrillo de Vallejo, a Californio ranchera, socialite, and entrepreneur.

== History ==
The bust was sculpted by artist Rosa Estebañez and erected in 1973. Funding for the bust was donated by the Vallejo Rotary Club. The bust was placed at Vallejo City Hall alongside the Bust of General Mariano G. Vallejo (her husband), and a bust of Chief Solano.

In November 2023, the bust was stolen in the middle of the night, along with metal railing at the entrance of city hall.
