= Mariano Rodríguez (painter) =

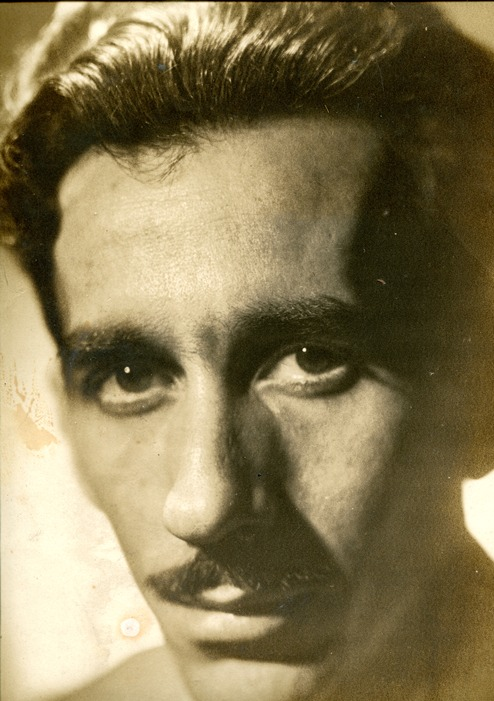
- Born: José Mariano Manuel Rodríguez Álvarez; August 24, 1912; Havana, Cuba
- Died: 1990 (aged 77–78); Havana, Cuba
- Education: Escuela de Artes Plásticas San Alejandro
- Known for: Painting
- Notable work: Guajiro con gallo (1943)
- Movement: Cuban modernism
- Website: marianoart.com

Mariano Rodríguez (24 August 1912 – 1990) was a Cuban painter associated with the mid-twentieth-century modern art movement in Cuba. Known for his vivid colors, stylized figures, and recurring motifs of roosters and peasants, Rodríguez is regarded as one of the principal figures in Cuban modernism.

== Early life and education ==
José Mariano Manuel Rodríguez Álvarez was born in Havana, Cuba, on 24 August 1912, the fifth of eight children. His mother, Amelia Alejandrina Álvarez Álvarez, was the daughter of Asturian immigrants and had studied under Cuban painters Leopoldo Romañach and Armando Menocal; his father, José Mariano Rodríguez Cabrera, came from Santa Cruz de la Palma in the Canary Islands.

From 1915 to around 1920, the family lived in the Canary Islands, later returning to Havana, where Rodríguez attended Hermanos Maristas school in La Víbora and the Instituto de Segunda Enseñanza. In 1933 he completed his bachillerato and began drawing and painting while studying intermittently at the Escuela de Artes Plásticas San Alejandro. He also took private lessons from painter Alberto Peña (“Peñita”) and worked as a cashier at the Havana Yacht Club in 1935.

== Career ==
In 1936 Rodríguez traveled to Mexico City with sculptor Alfredo Lozano, where he met members of the Mexican muralist movement and studied briefly with painter Manuel Rodríguez Lozano. Although he spent time in Mexico and New York, his artistic imagination remained rooted in Cuba, drawing inspiration from the island's people, landscapes, and culture.

Rodríguez's early work combined influences from Mexican muralism and European modernism, particularly Paul Cézanne and Diego Rivera. His painting Guajiro con gallo (1943) exemplifies his mature style, in which the Cuban rooster (gallo) and peasant (guajiro) became recurring national symbols. The work was exhibited in Modern Cuban Painters at the Museum of Modern Art (MoMA), New York, in 1944.

By the late 1940s and 1950s, Rodríguez's art evolved toward a more abstract expression while maintaining its Cuban thematic focus. He became a leading figure of the island's modern art scene alongside artists such as Amelia Peláez, René Portocarrero, and Wifredo Lam.

== Style and themes ==
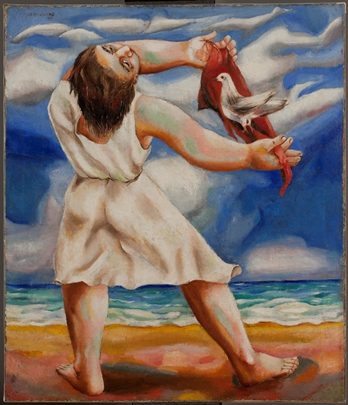
Mariano Rodriguez - La paloma de la paz, 1940

Rodríguez's paintings are characterized by bold colors, rhythmic compositions, and the synthesis of figuration and abstraction. He described his artistic vision as a search for “the Cuba of light, baroque form, and color that I desire.”

Recurring motifs in his work include roosters, rural peasants, tropical fruits, and lush vegetation, all rendered through expressive brushwork and intense chromatic contrasts. According to MoMA’s founding director Alfred H. Barr Jr., Rodríguez’s art revealed “Cuban color, Cuban light, Cuban forms, and Cuban motifs … plastically and imaginatively assimilated rather than realistically represented.”
