= Diez de Octubre =

- Fourth Subdivision of Havana
- Subdivicion de Diez de Octubre
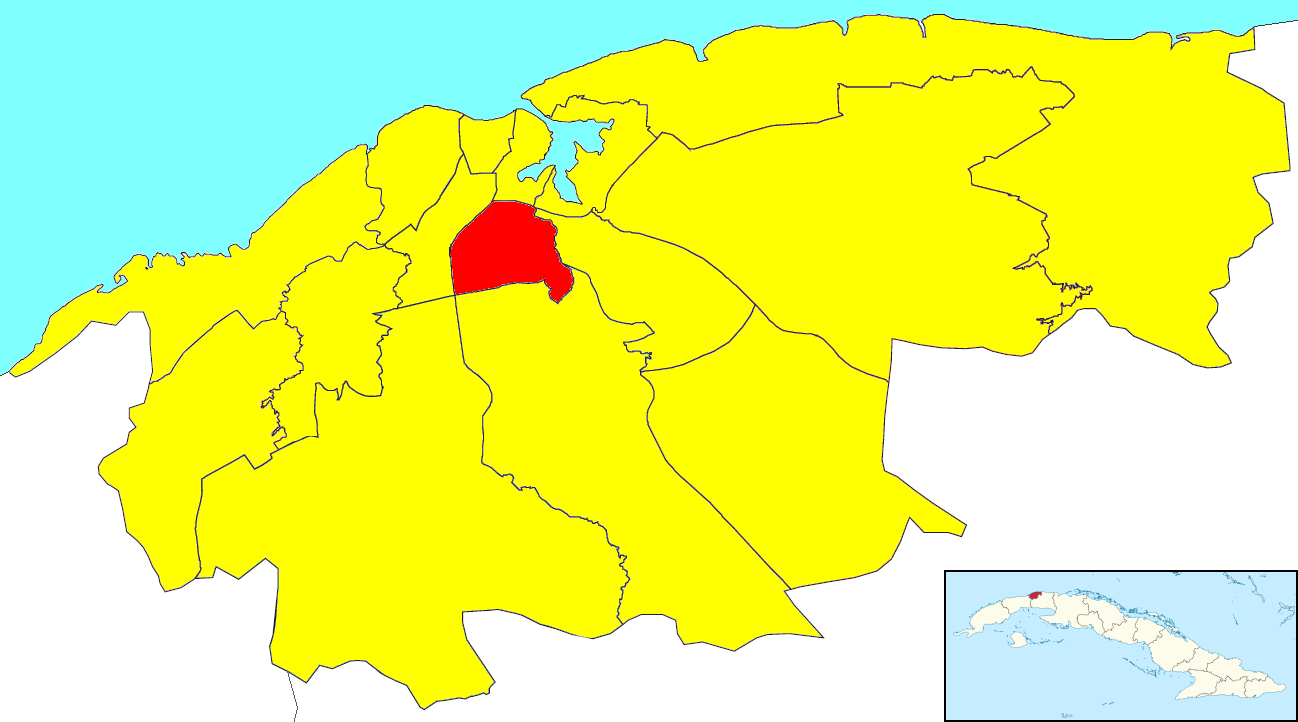
- Location of Diez de Octubre in Havana
- Coordinates: 23°05′17″N 82°21′35″W
- Country: Cuba
- Province: Ciudad de La Habana
- Wards (Consejos Populares): Acosta, Jesús del Monte, La Víbora, Lawton, Luyanó, Santos Suárez, Sevillano, Tamarindo, Vista Alegre

Area
  - Total: 12 km^{2} (4.6 sq mi)

Population (2022)
  - Total: 199,933
  - Density: 17,000/km^{2} (43,000/sq mi)
- Time zone: UTC-5 (EST)
- Area code: +53-7

Diez de Octubre is one of the 15 municipalities or boroughs (municipios in Spanish) in the city of Havana, Cuba.

== Overview ==
It is one of the oldest municipalities of the capital, founded in the second half of the 16th Century to populate the city when Canary Islanders emigrated to Cuba.
