= Luyanó =

- Ward and Section of populated place
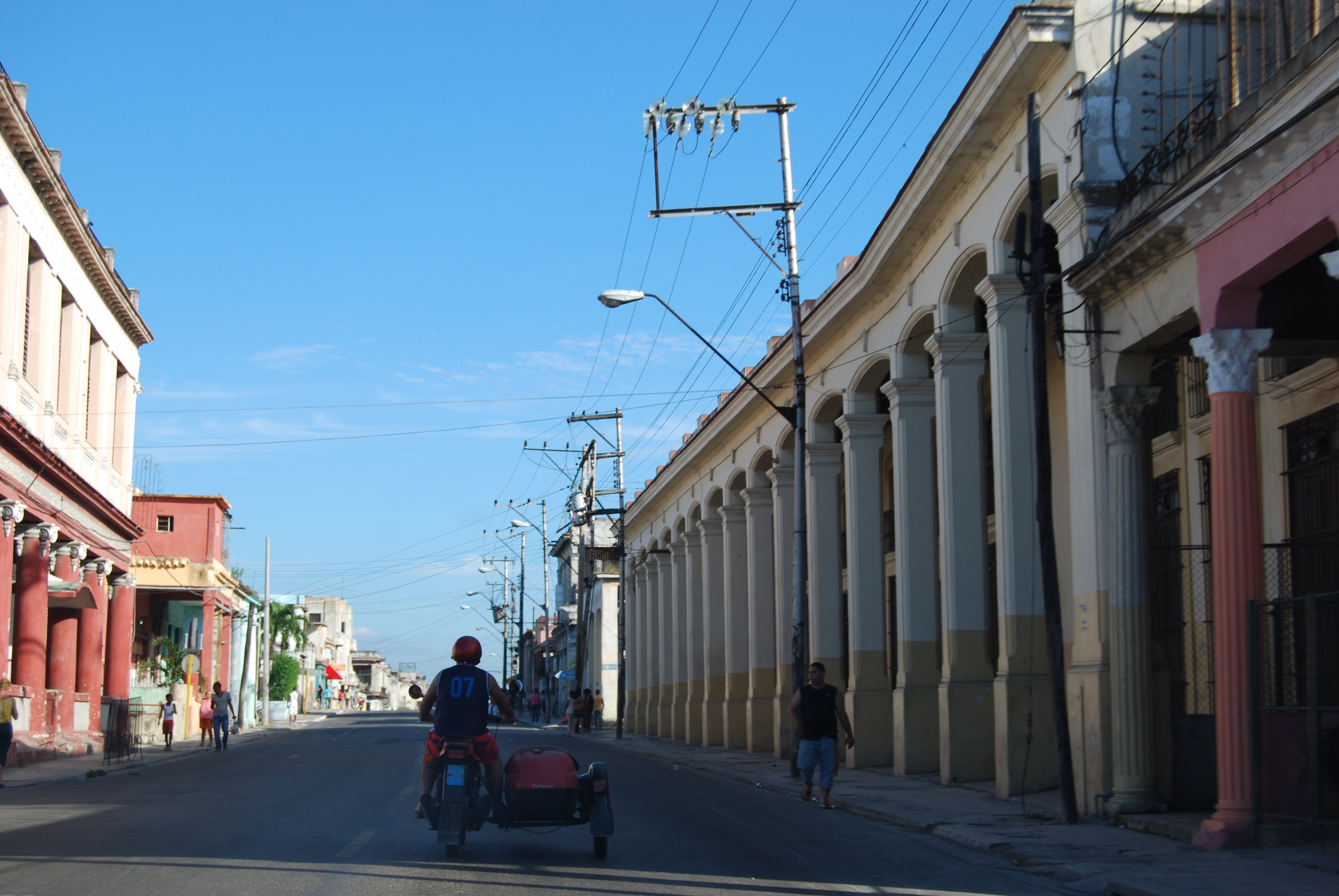
- Luyanó in 2012

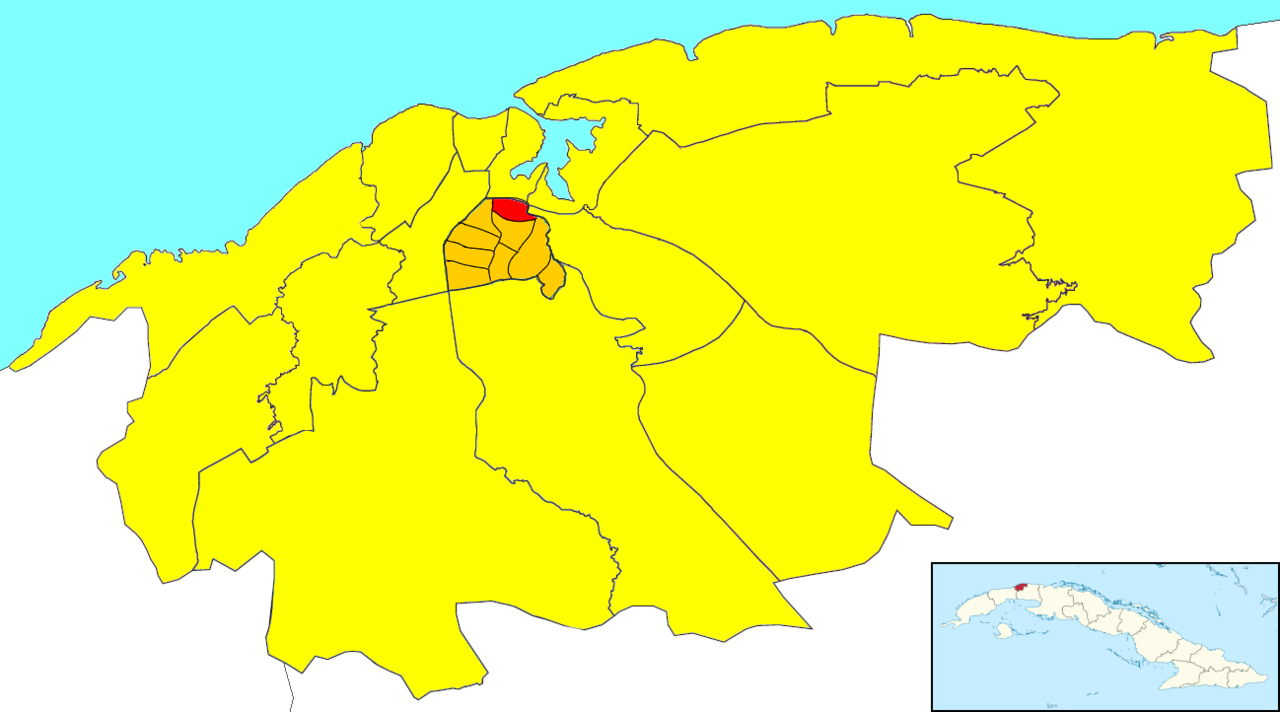
- Coordinates: 23.109°N 82.360°W
- Country: Cuba
- Province: La Habana
- Municipality: Diez de Octubre
- Founded: Mid-1950s
- Elevation: 15 m (49 ft)

Luyanó is a consejo popular (i.e. "popular council or ward") and a Section of populated place within the municipality of Diez de Octubre, Havana, Cuba. Notable people from Luyanó include artist Rosa Estebanez.
