= Bust of General Mariano G. Vallejo (Vallejo) =

Statue in Vallejo, California

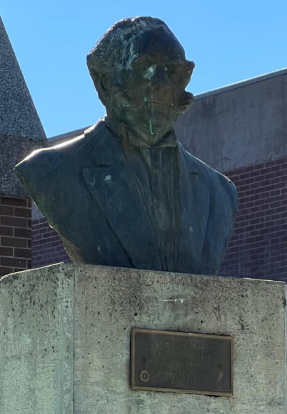
- Artist: Rosa Estebañez
- Year: 1973
- Medium: Bronze
- Subject: Mariano Guadalupe Vallejo
- Location: Vallejo City Hall, Vallejo, California; 38.10231°N 122.26030°W

The Bust of General Mariano G. Vallejo is a bronze monument at in Vallejo, California, located at Vallejo City Hall, honoring Mariano Guadalupe Vallejo, a Californio general, statesman, and namesake of the city of Vallejo.

== History ==
The bust was sculpted by artist Rosa Estebañez and erected in 1973. Funding for the bust was donated by the Vallejo Rotary Club. The bust was placed at Vallejo City Hall alongside two other busts by Estebañez, the Bust of Francisca Benicia Carrillo de Vallejo and a bust of Chief Solano.

The Petaluma Adobe has another bust of General Mariano G. Vallejo also by Rosa Estebañez.
