= La Víbora, Havana =

La Víbora
- Ward
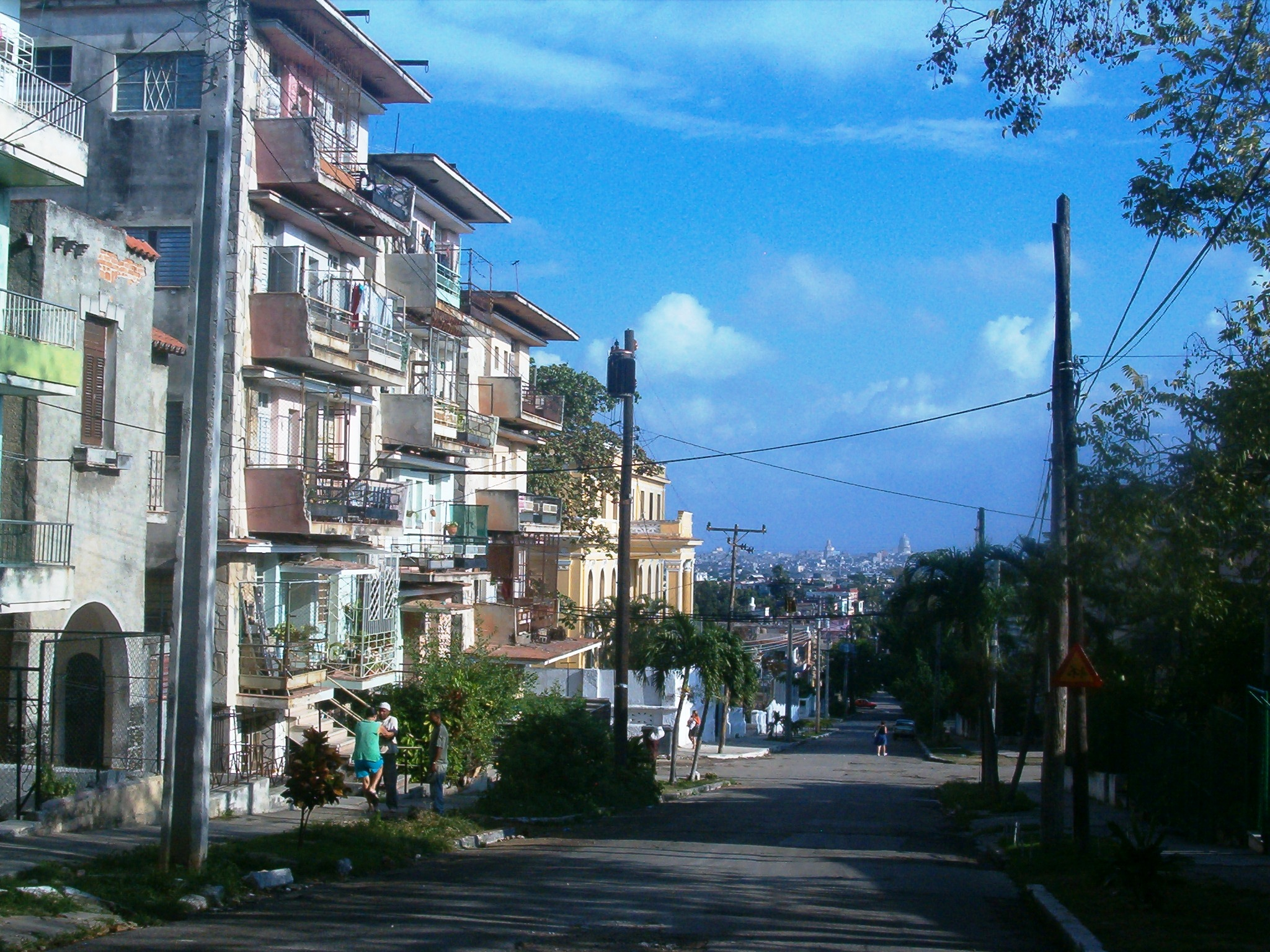
- View of Havana from the hills of La Víbora (Cuba)

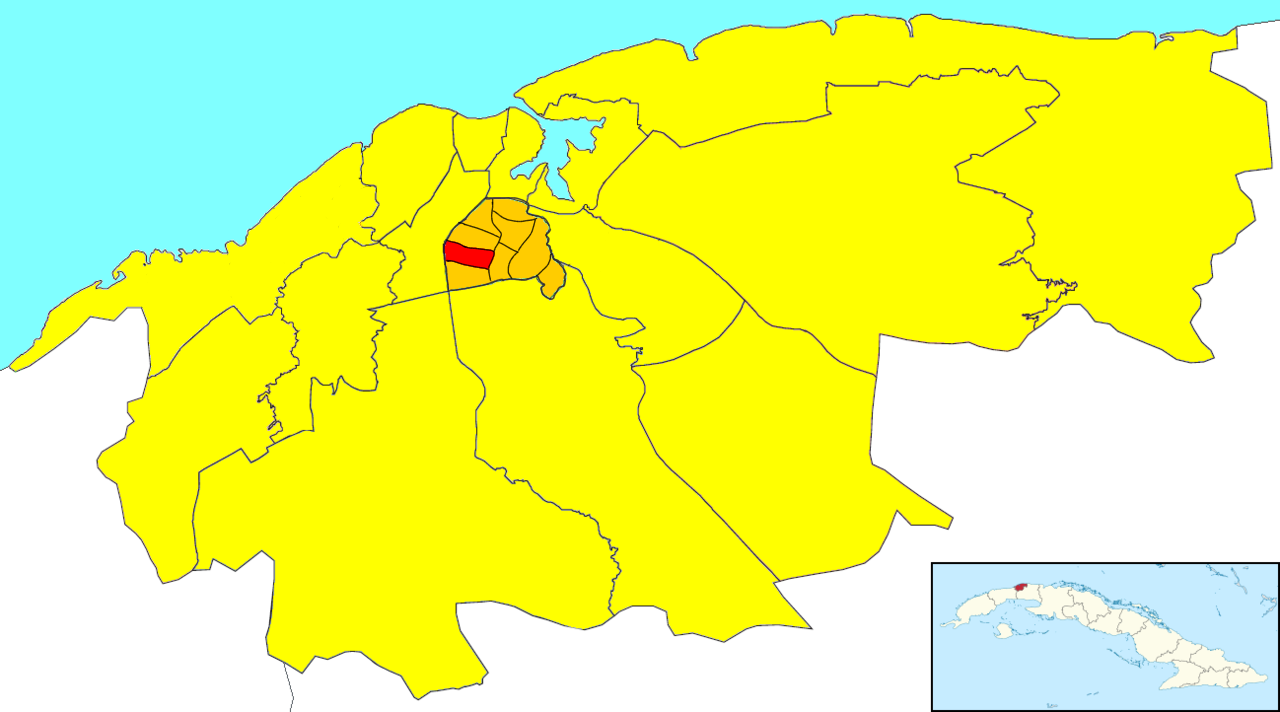
- Country: Cuba
- Province: La Habana
- Municipality: Diez de Octubre

La Víbora is a ward (consejo popular) within the municipality of Diez de Octubre, Havana, Cuba. Principal streets include Calzada 10 de octubre to the east, Avenida Santa Catalina to the south, and Avenida General Lacret to the north.

== History ==
La Víbora was founded in 1689, as a small town where the exchange of horses would occur for caravans traveling from Havana to Güines. The town grew rapidly, and by 1698 it began to appear in local maps and chronicles. Today, it is Havana's most populated "barrio", with 23,118 inhabitants.

Famous residents included Antonio Bachiller y Morales, president José Miguel Gómez, Rafael Trejo, Carlos Enríquez, Mariano Rodríguez, musician Jorge Anckermann, diplomat Raúl Roa, and Manuel Cofiño, Elena Josefina Lozano Wilson.

== In popular culture ==
La Víbora is mentioned in the Broadway musical In the Heights in the song "Paciencia y Fe" (English: "Patience and Faith"). In the song, Abuela Claudia recounts growing up in La Víbora before moving to New York City with her mother, describing it as "the Washington Heights of Havana" and asking herself "Are you better off than you were with the birds of La Víbora?".
