= Statue of Lucha Reyes =

Statue in Los Angeles, California, U.S.

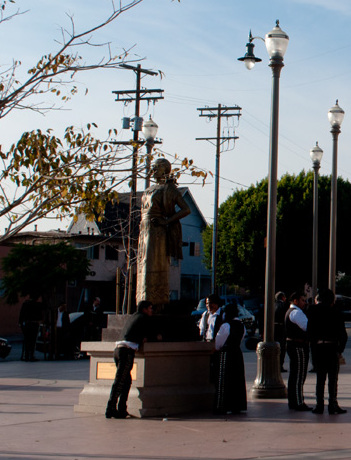
- Year: 2009
- Subject: Lucha Reyes
- Location: Mariachi Plaza, Los Angeles, California; 34.047536°N 118.219601°W

The Statue of Lucha Reyes is a bronze sculpture in Los Angeles, California, located at Mariachi Plaza, honoring Lucha Reyes, known as the "Queen of Ranchera".

== History ==
Lucha Reyes had lived in Los Angeles for part of her life. The monument to her was erected on 15 November 2009 at Mariachi Plaza, in the LA neighborhood of Boyle Heights.

In 2014, the street which passes next to Mariachi Plaza was rededicated as Avenida Lucha Reyes.
