= San Fernando Valley Historical Society =

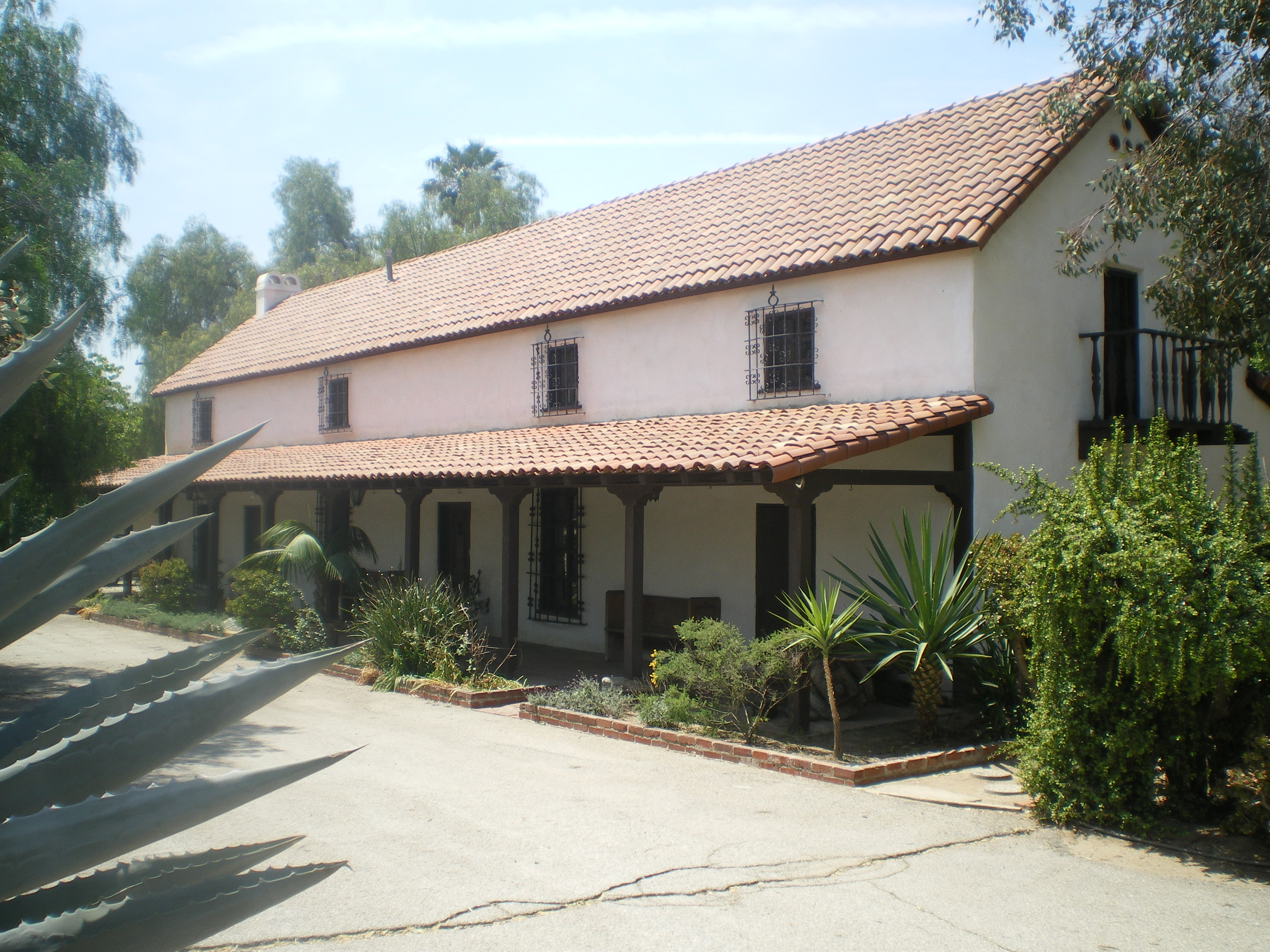
The San Fernando Valley Historical Society Museum, at the Andres Pico Adobe.

The San Fernando Valley Historical Society is a private service organization, in Mission Hills, Los Angeles County, California, that is committed to "research, collect and preserve the history, art and culture of the San Fernando Valley". The group was founded on July 4, 1943.

== Activities ==
The Society offers regular Andres Pico Adobe tours, and special programs and concerts, to educate and entertain the public, listed in an online calendar.

=== Museum ===
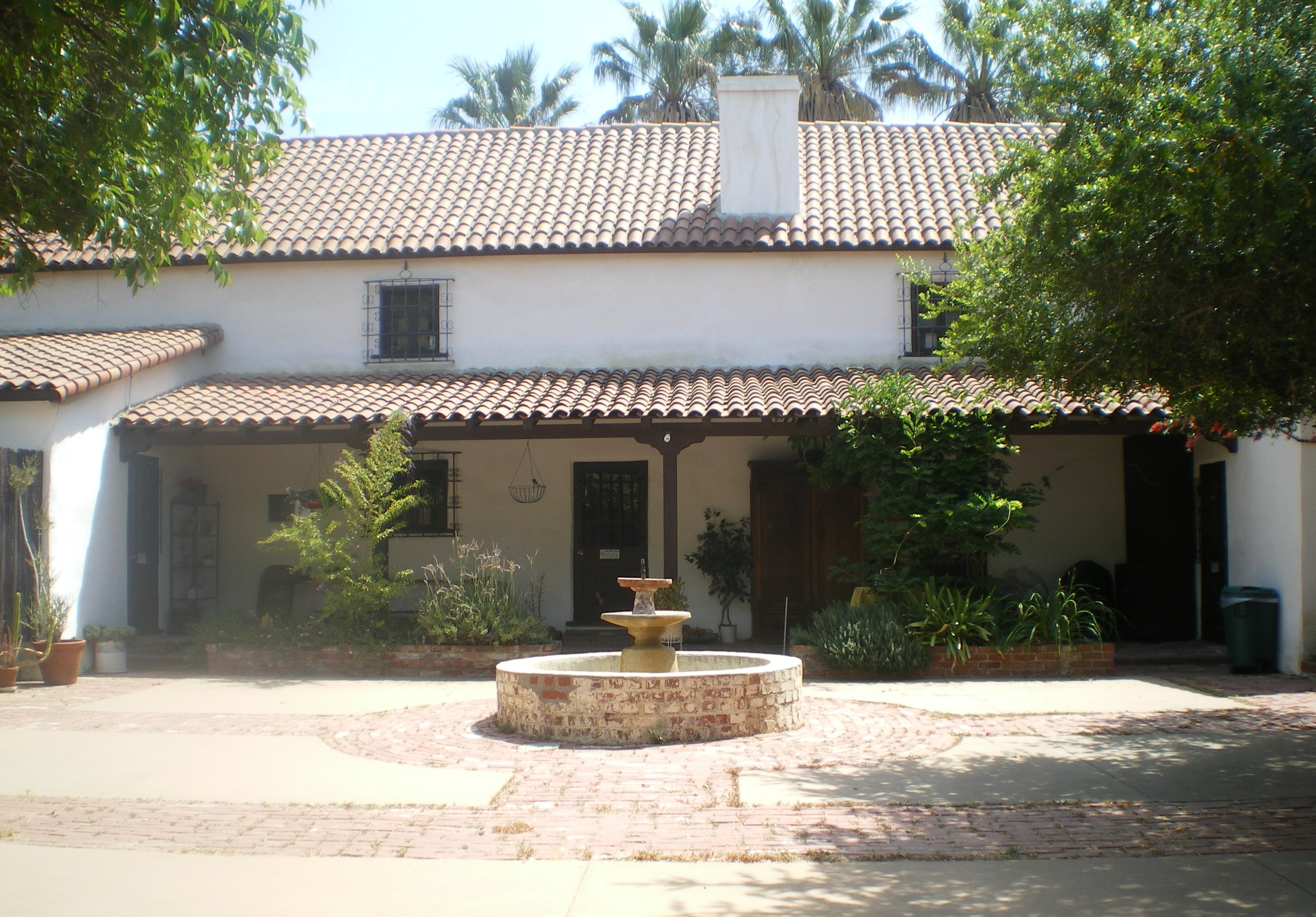
The Pico Adobe courtyard, at the Historical Society Museum.

The San Fernando Valley Historical Society has a Museum about the Valley's history, housed in the landmark Andres Pico Adobe. The museum offers vintage room settings of the era, antique and artifact displays, and period gardens. The museum is located near the Mission San Fernando Rey de España in Mission Hills, California.

== See also ==
- History of the San Fernando Valley to 1915
- List of Los Angeles Historic-Cultural Monuments in the San Fernando Valley
