= Vaquero Monument =

Equestrian statue in Los Angeles, California, U.S.

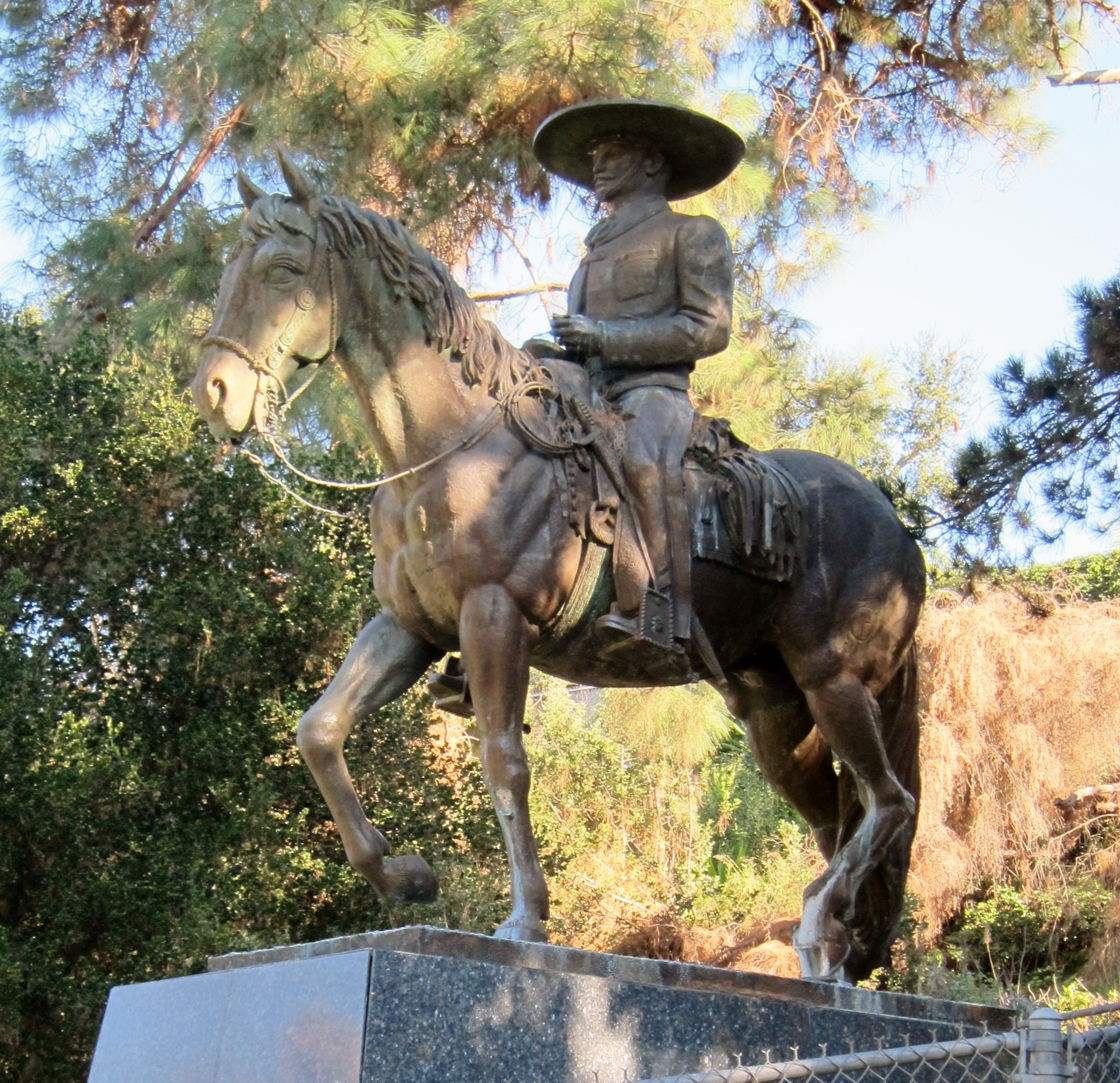
- Year: 1970
- Subject: Californio vaquero
- Location: Presidio Park, San Diego, California

The Vaquero Monument is a bronze equestrian statue of a Californio vaquero in San Diego, California, located in Presidio Park.

== History ==
The statue was donated to the city of San Diego by Mexican President Gustavo Díaz Ordaz during his visit on November 10, 1970, to celebrate the 200th anniversary of the founding of the Presidio of San Diego.

In 2020, a petition to remove Mexican President Gustavo Díaz Ordaz's name from the statue circulated, citing the president's involvement in the Tlatelolco massacre of 1968, which resulted in hundreds of deaths of peaceful protesters in Mexico City.
