= Fred J. Wiseman =

American aviator

Frederick Joseph Wiseman
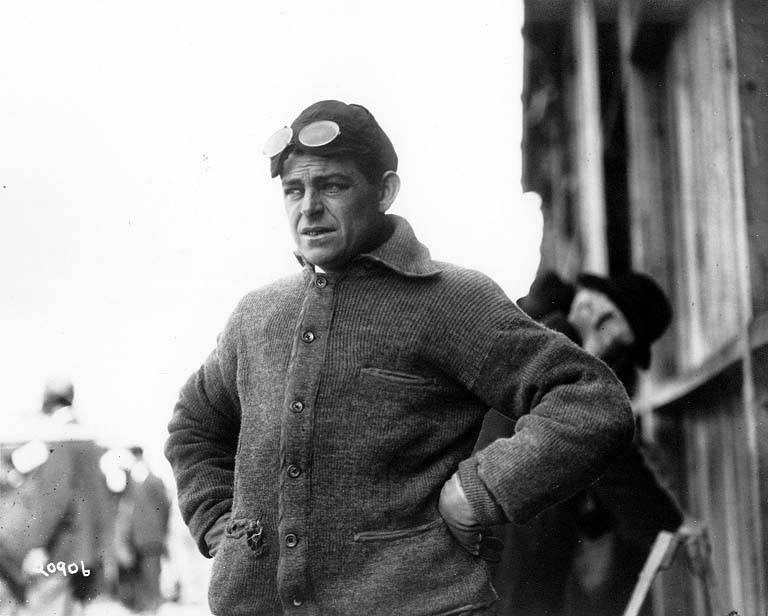
- Wiseman on May 19, 1911 in Olympia, Washington
- Born: November 10, 1875; Sonoma Valley, California, US
- Died: October 4, 1961 (aged 85); Oakland, California, US
- Occupation: Aviator
- Years active: 1910–1912
- Known for: Car racing, amateur aviation
- Notable work: World's first airmail

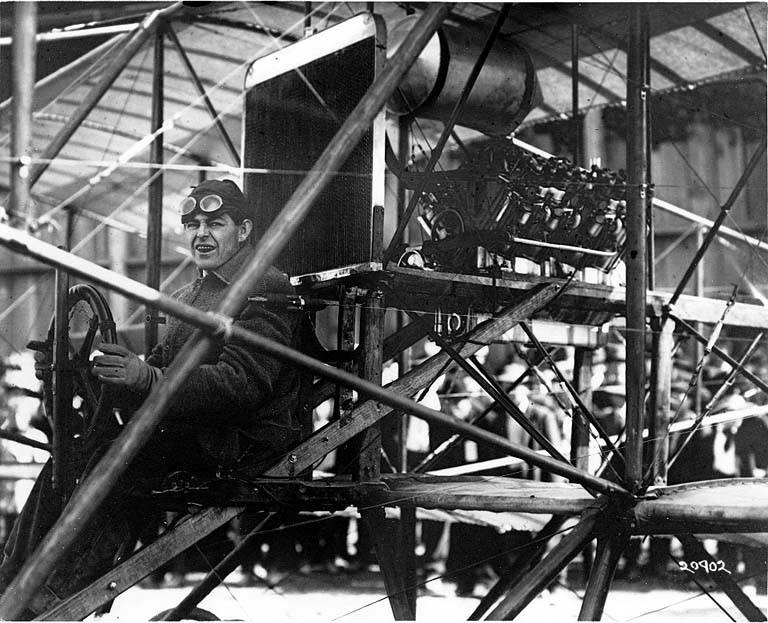
Wiseman piloting a biplane at the first air show at Olympia, California.

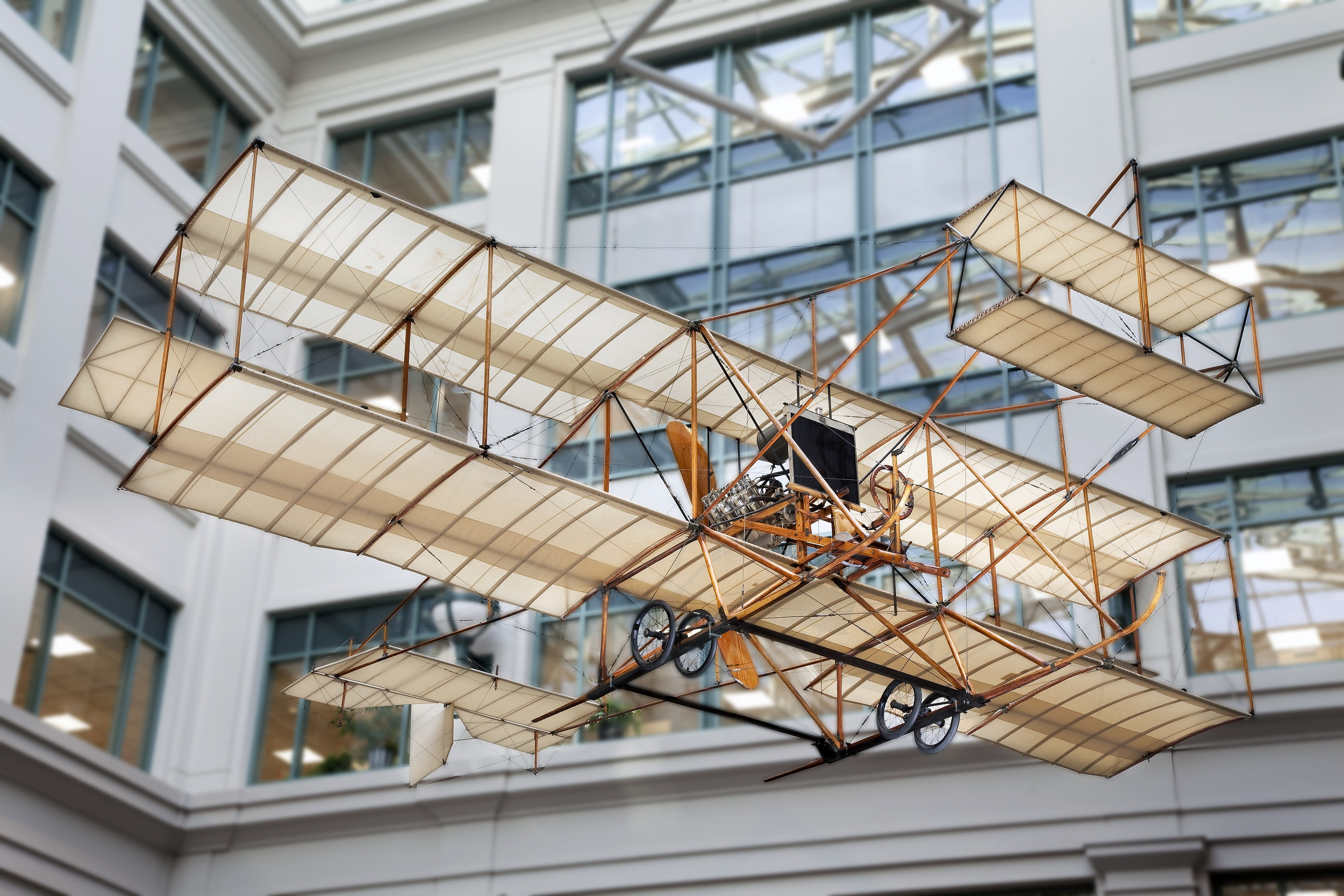
Wiseman-Cooke-Flugzeug National Air and Space Museum

Frederick Joseph Wiseman (November 10, 1875 – October 4, 1961) was an American aviation pioneer, Racing car driver, self-taught aircraft builder and Amateur pilot. He was considered as one of the most successful aviators during his time. He is also credited for flying the first airmail on February 18, 1911, which was sent from Petaluma and delivered at Santa Rosa, California.

== Biography ==
Wiseman was born on November 10, 1875, on a ranch in the Valley of the Moon, which was located between Glen Ellen and Santa Rosa. After studying at local schools in California, he became engaged in bicycle and automotive businesses. He settled in Santa Rosa when he was 23.

Before becoming an aviator, Wiseman first earned a reputation as a race car driver. He had participated and won several championships at state fairs. An account cited that Wiseman became interested in the field of aviation when he attended the Wright brothers' homecoming celebration in 1909 and the first Los Angeles aviation meet held the following year.

Wiseman announced his retirement from auto racing on February 3, 1910, to focus on aeronautics. Together with M. W. Peters and Julian Pierre, they constructed the first successful aeroplane built by a Californian. It was powered by a 50-horsepower Hall-Scott motor. Wiseman made his first flight on board the plane on April 24, 1910. Wiseman was distinguished for being one of the few self-taught novice aviators who were successful, particularly in passing qualifying flights. Amateur aviators were able to get aeroplanes into the air for a few seconds but, due to lack of instruction, aeroplane construction methods, flying experience, and engine power, they were often unable to make sustained flights or safe landings.

Wiseman later became an executive of the Standard Oil Co. He died on October 4, 1961.

== First airmail ==
Wiseman was working on an aeroplane secretly in one of the barns of the Windsor's Laughlin Ranch. This plane was intended for the delivery of airmail, something the world had not seen before. Wiseman copied the plane's design from photographs of the Wright Flyer. On February 13, 1911, Wiseman successfully completed its first test flight. The aeroplane was later dismantled and reassembled at Petaluma's Sonoma-Marin fairgrounds. Wiseman flew to Santa Rosa and successfully delivered a stamped letter from the mayor of Petaluma to the mayor of Santa Rosa. It was officially sanctioned by the U.S. Postal Service.

The 12-minute flight time, which also included a sack of groceries and 50 copies of the Santa Rosa Press Democrat, established the world's first airmail service. The total flight time was considerably shorter because it took Wiseman two days to complete the journey, which included two forced landings. The aircraft flew 100 feet (30 m) off the ground, reaching the speed of 70 miles per hour (110 km/h). The plane that Wiseman used was on display at the Smithsonian Institution as of 2007.
