= Bust of General Mariano G. Vallejo (Petaluma) =

Statue in Petaluma, California

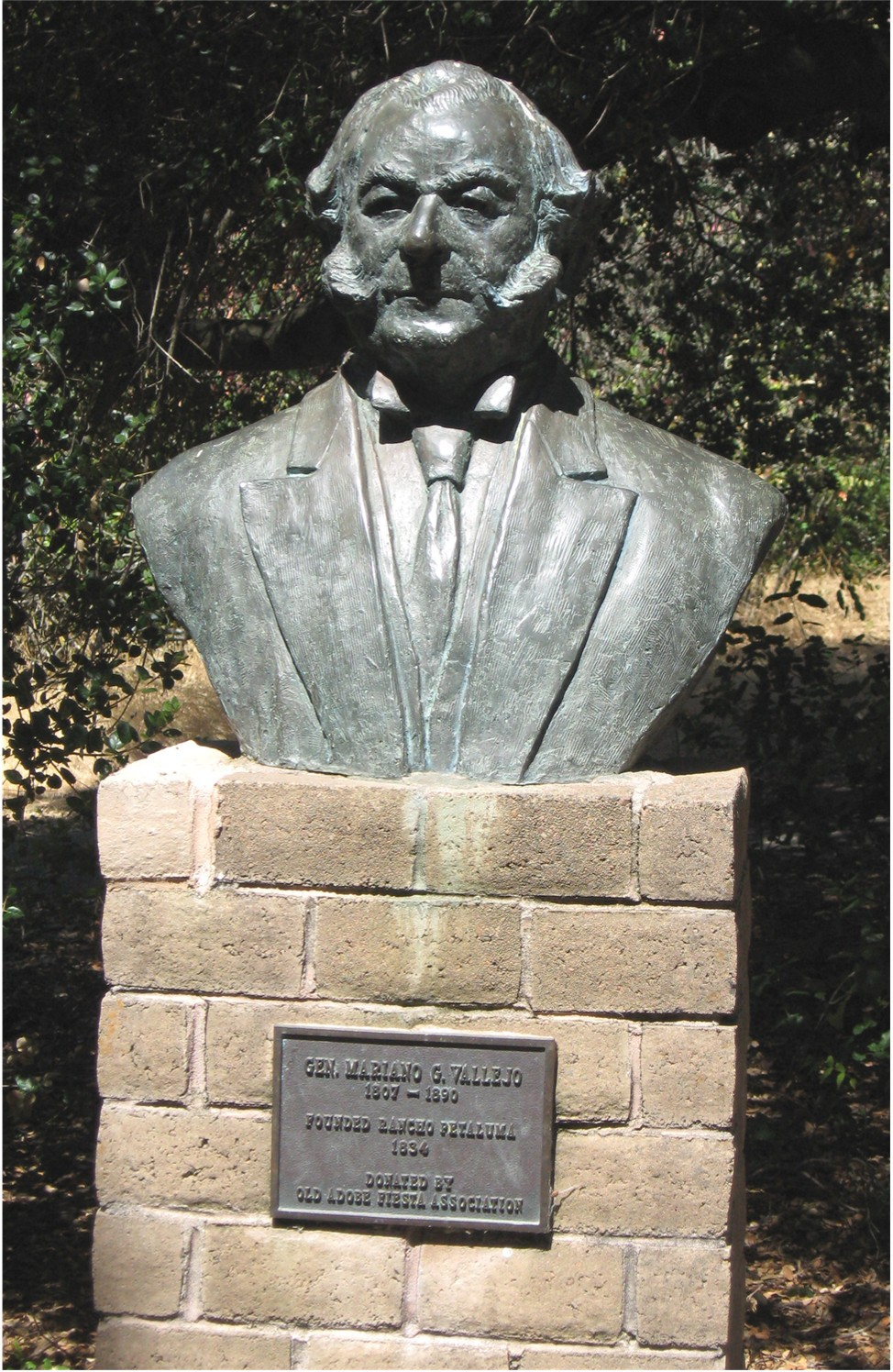
- Artist: Rosa Estebañez
- Year: 1975
- Medium: Bronze
- Subject: Mariano Guadalupe Vallejo
- Location: Rancho Petaluma Adobe State Historic Park, Petaluma, California

The Bust of General Mariano G. Vallejo is a bronze monument at Rancho Petaluma Adobe State Historic Park, in Petaluma, California, honoring Mariano Guadalupe Vallejo, a Californio general, statesman, and ranchero who founded the city of Petaluma.

== History ==
The bust was sculpted by Petaluma artists Rosa Estebañez in 1975 and donated by the Old Adobe Fiesta Association to Rancho Petaluma Adobe State Historic Park, General Vallejo's estate originally built in 1836.
