= Vallejo City Hall =

- U.S. National Register of Historic Places
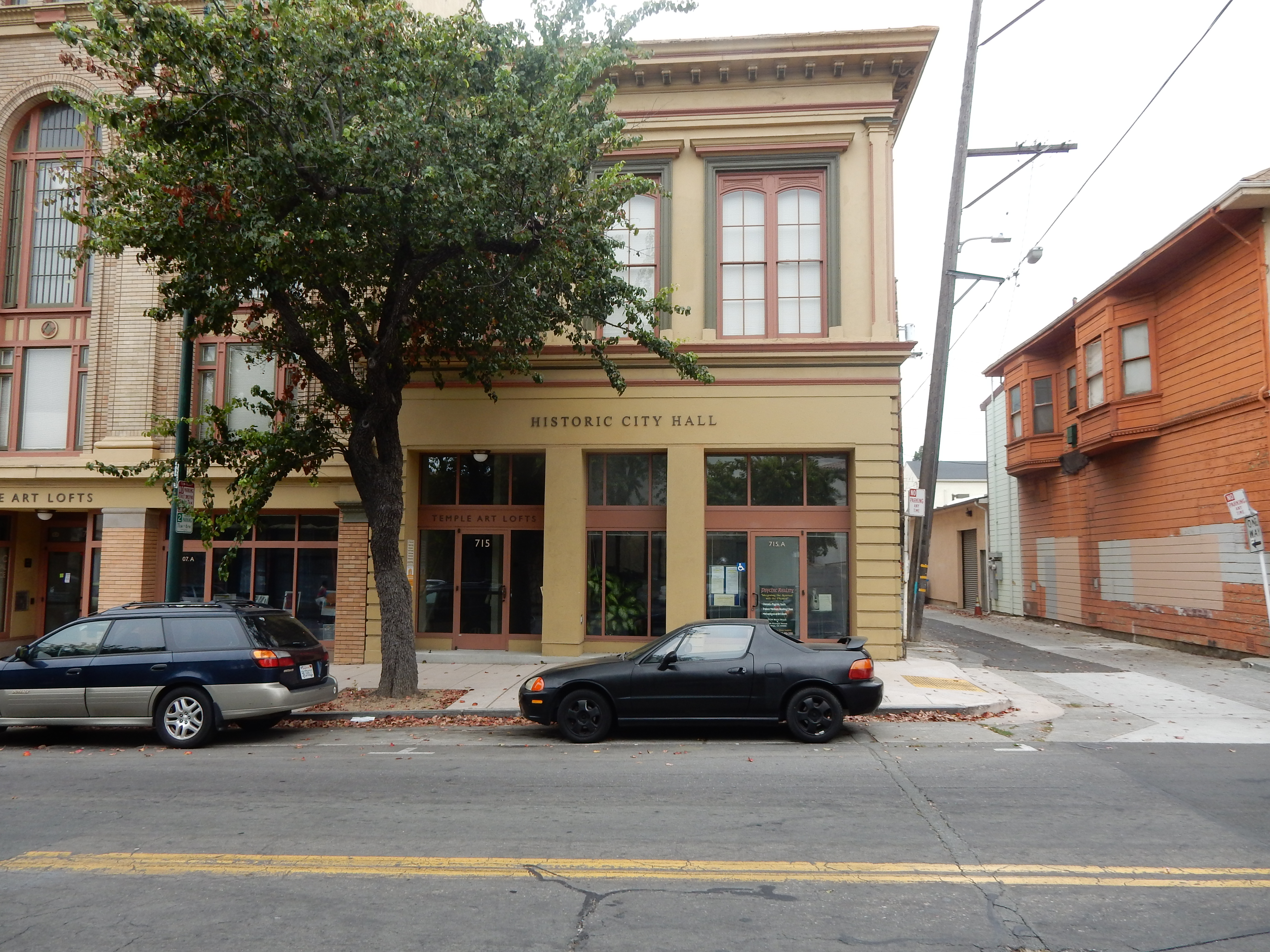

- Location within California Location within the United States
- Location: 715 Marin St., Vallejo, California
- Coordinates: 38.1026°N 122.2568°W
- Built: 1872
- NRHP reference No.: 13000591
- Added to NRHP: June 28, 2013

- Vallejo City Hall and County Building Branch
- U.S. National Register of Historic Places
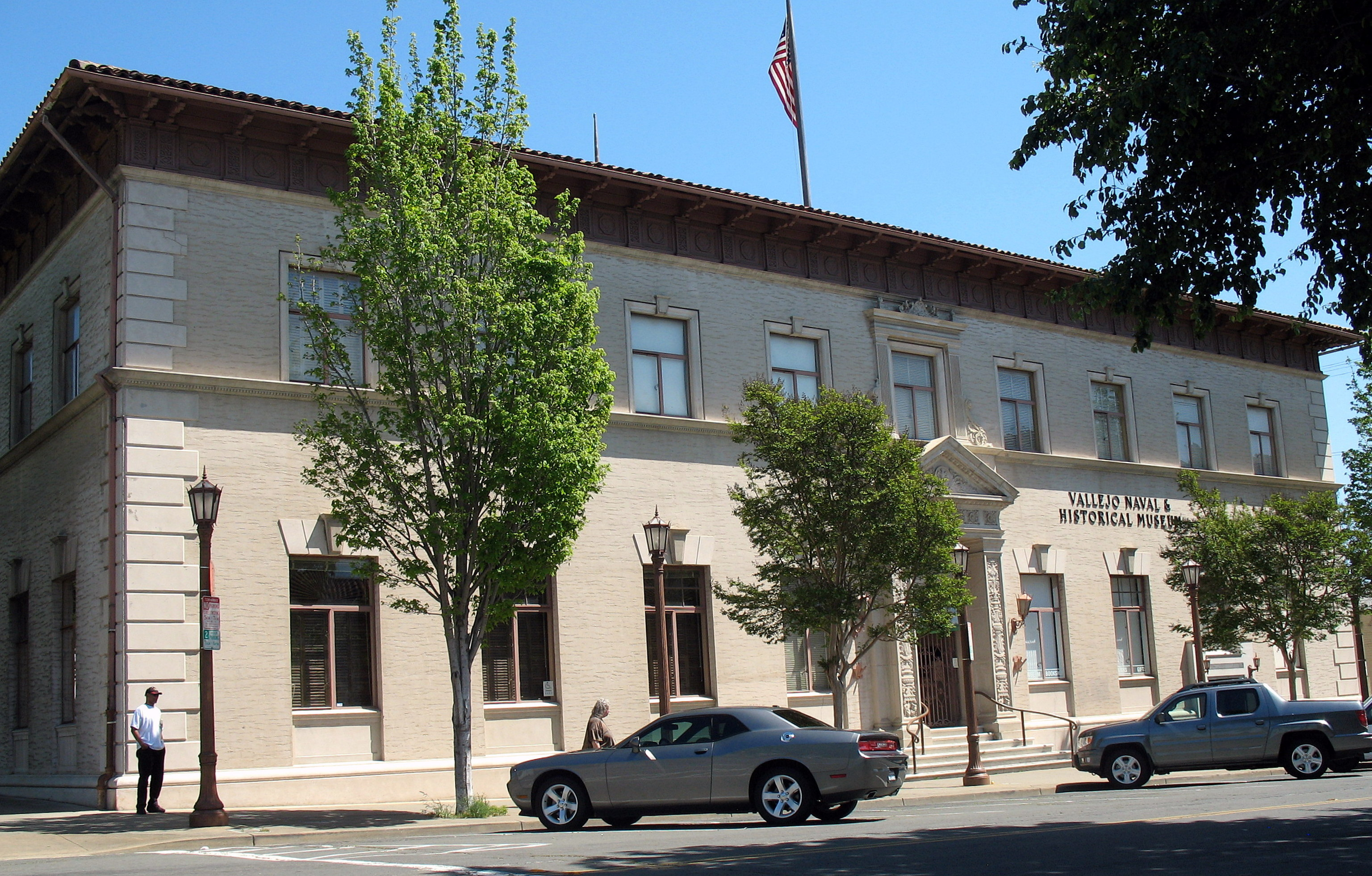

- Location within California Location within the United States
- Location: 734 Marin St., Vallejo, California
- Coordinates: 38.1028°N 122.2565°W
- Built: 1927
- NRHP reference No.: 76000535

Two former city hall buildings in Vallejo, California are listed in the National Register of Historic Places. Today the old city hall built in 1872 partially houses the Temple Art Lofts, a combination art gallery and apartment complex, and the 1927 city hall houses the Vallejo Naval and Historical Museum.

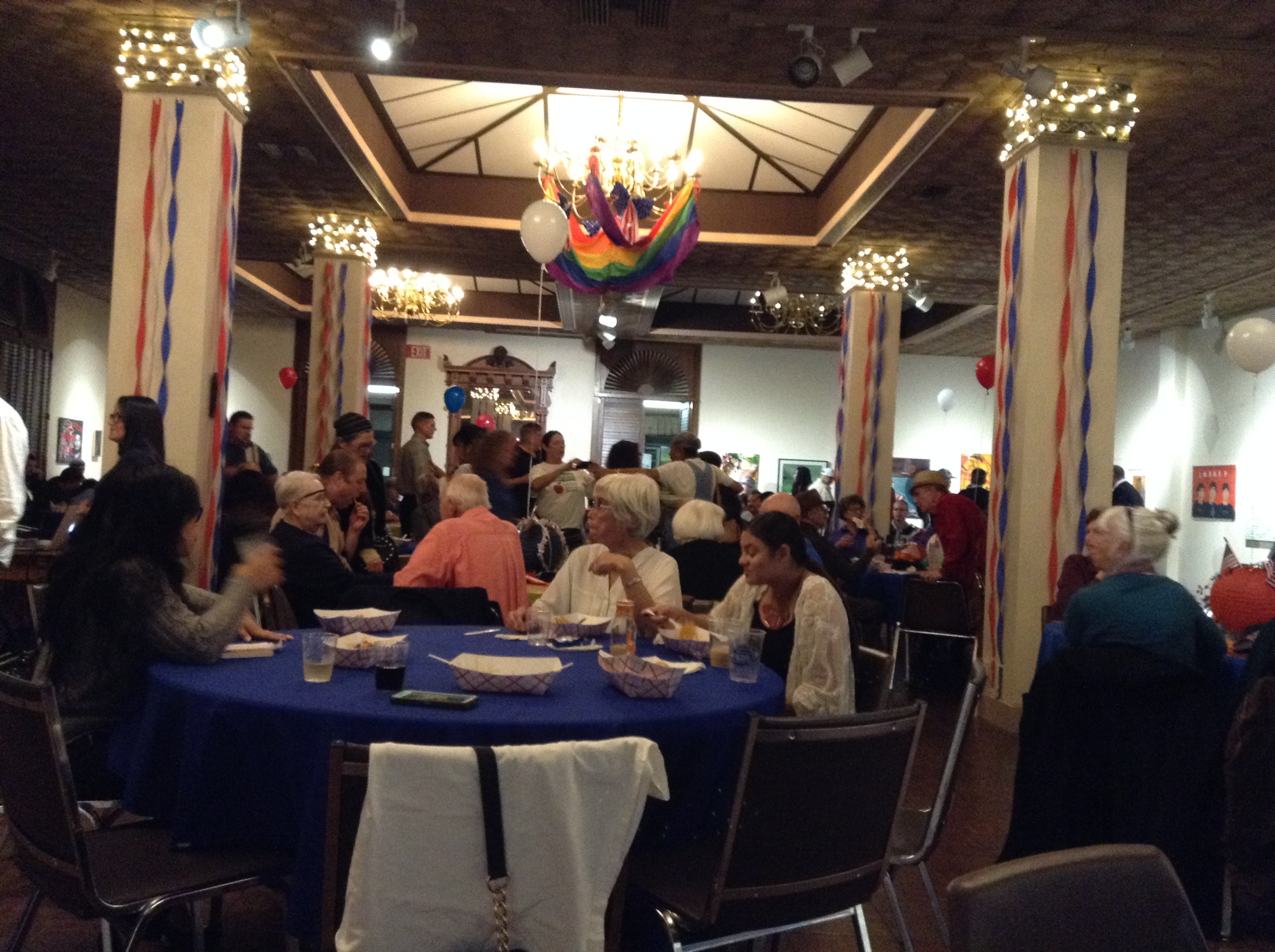
An event at the Vallejo Naval and Historical Museum, located within the 1927 city hall building
